= Aria decipientiformis =

Conservation status
- Data Deficient (IUCN 3.1)

Scientific classification
- Kingdom: Plantae
- Clade: Tracheophytes
- Clade: Angiosperms
- Clade: Eudicots
- Clade: Rosids
- Order: Rosales
- Family: Rosaceae
- Genus: Aria
- Species: A. decipientiformis

Binomial name
- Aria decipientiformis (Kárpáti) Mosyakin, Fedor. & McNeill
- It is endemic to the Keszthely Hills, Hungary

Synonyms
- Karpatiosorbus decipientiformis (Kárpáti) Sennikov & Kurtto; Pyrus decipientiformis (Kárpáti) M.F.Fay & Christenh.; Sorbus decipientiformis Kárpáti

Species of tree in the family Rosaceae

Aria decipientiformis is a species of tree in the family Rosaceae endemic to Zala, Hungary. It is only known from the type specimen collected in 1949, and it has not been seen since then.

== Description ==
Aria decipientiformis is a tree or shrub.

== Taxonomy ==
It was first described as Sorbus decipientiformis Kárpáti by Zoltan Kárpáti in 1950. It was moved to the genus Aria (Pers.) J.Jacq. ex Host as Aria decipientiformis (Kárpáti) Mosyakin, Fedor. & McNeill by Sergei Leonidovich Mosyakin, Mykola Mykhaylovych Fedoronchuk, and John McNeill in 2025. The type specimen was collected on the 18 September 1949 by Z. Kárpáti on the slopes of the mountain Bodorhalás above the Kígyós-völgy valley near the village of Balatongyörök, Zala, Hungary, at an altitude of 320 m above sea level.

=== Etymology ===
The specific epithet decipientiformis refers to morphological similarities with another species.

== Distribution and habitat ==
Aria decipientiformis is endemic to the Keszthely Hills, Hungary, where it occurs in temperate forest at elevations of 300–350 m above sea level.

== Conservation ==
The IUCN conservation status of Aria decipientiformis is data deficient (DD). In the Red List of threatened tree and shrub species of Hungary, it is categorised as data deficient (DD). It is cultivated in 2 ex situ conservation collections in botanic gardens, but the identity of the plants held in the collections is questionable. Plants sold as "Sorbus decipientiformis 'Vállus'" are in fact Aria rhombiformis. Some of the several undescribed single individual whitebeams in the Keszthely Mountains resemble Aria decipientiformis, but they are not this species. Aria decipientiformis is only known from the type specimen and no other individuals, living or preserved as herbarium specimens, are known.
