= Aria acutiserrata =

Conservation status
- Critically Endangered (IUCN 3.1)

Scientific classification
- Kingdom: Plantae
- Clade: Tracheophytes
- Clade: Angiosperms
- Clade: Eudicots
- Clade: Rosids
- Order: Rosales
- Family: Rosaceae
- Genus: Aria
- Species: A. acutiserrata

Binomial name
- Aria acutiserrata (C.Németh) Mosyakin, Fedor. & McNeill
- It is endemic to the Vértes Mountains, Hungary

Synonyms
- Karpatiosorbus acutiserrata (C.Németh) Sennikov & Kurtto; Pyrus vertesica M.F.Fay & Christenh.; Sorbus acutiserrata C.Németh

Species of tree in the family Rosaceae

Aria acutiserrata is an extremely rare apomictic species of tree in the family Rosaceae endemic to Hungary. It is threatened with extinction and was feared to have gone extinct in the wild in 2025, due to grazing animals, until new growth was found in 2026.

== Description ==
=== Vegetative characteristics ===
Aria acutiserrata is an up to 10 m tall tree with smooth, grey bark. The simple, pinnately-lobed leaves have a doubly serrated margin on the upper part of the lamina. The greenish-grey abaxial leaf surface is tomentose. The leaf lobes are acute, markedly serrated, and dentate. The ovate, 70–80 mm long, and 55–75 mm wide leaves of the short, sterile twigs have a cuneate base and 9–10 lateral veins. The ovate or broadly ovate, 80–90(–100) mm long, and 65–90(–100) mm wide leaves on the fertile, terminal twigs have a cuneate base and 9–10 lateral veins. The subtomentose petioles are 16–22 mm long.

=== Generative characteristics ===
The many-flowered, corymbose inflorescence with tomentose branches bears 30–40 flowers. The whitish-tomentose sepals are triangular. The broadly ovate petals are white. The red, globose, (9–)10(–11) mm long, and (11–)12(–13) mm wide fruit with persistent sepals bears numerous white, 0.5 mm wide lenticels. The tomentose sepals of the mature fruit are 3–4 mm wide.

== Taxonomy ==
It was first described as Sorbus acutiserrata C.Németh by Csaba Németh in 2009. It was moved to the genus Aria (Pers.) J.Jacq. ex Host as Aria acutiserrata (C.Németh) Mosyakin, Fedor. & McNeill by Sergei Leonidovich Mosyakin, Mykola Mykhaylovych Fedoronchuk, and John McNeill in 2025. The type specimen was collected on the 14 June 2008 by C. Németh in the forest of the Német-völgy valley near Gánt (Kőhányás), Vértes, Central Hungary, at an altitude of 364 m above sea level.

=== Etymology ===
The specific epithet acutiserrata is derived from acutus meaning pointed or sharp, and serratus meaning serrated.

== Distribution and habitat ==
It is endemic to the Vértes Mountains near Gánt, Hungary, where it occurs in one area growing on dolomite or calcareous shallow soils, and on rocky ground at an elevation of 360 m above sea level. It grows along other Aria species, such as Aria degenii, Aria adamii, and Aria eugenii-kelleri.

== Conservation ==
In the IUCN Red List assessment from 2017, it was categorised as a critically endangered species with a small population of only 10 mature trees, which are limited to one location. In the Red List of threatened tree and shrub species of Hungary of 2019, it is also categorised as critically endangered. In 2025, it was feared to have gone extinct in the wild, due to grazing animals. Large herbivorous animals eat the saplings and strip the bark from older trees, which opens an entry point for pathogens, and the trampling animals worsen the soil erosion, leading to diminished water retention of the thinning soil layer. Invasive mouflons are of particular concern to the survival of Aria acutiserrata. In 2026, new growth was discovered on one surviving individual, but the new shoots were also already damaged by grazing animals. A fence against grazing animals has been erected to protect Aria acutiserrata from extinction. Saplings are growing in an ex situ conservation collection.
