= Torminaria =

Torminaria may refer to two different plant genera:

- Torminaria (DC.) M.Roem., a synonym for Aria, the genus of whitebeam trees
- Torminaria (DC.) Opiz, a synonym for Torminalis, a monotypic genus containing the wild service tree
