= Aria amici-petri =

Conservation status
- Endangered (IUCN 3.1)

Scientific classification
- Kingdom: Plantae
- Clade: Tracheophytes
- Clade: Angiosperms
- Clade: Eudicots
- Clade: Rosids
- Order: Rosales
- Family: Rosaceae
- Genus: Aria
- Species: A. amici-petri

Binomial name
- Aria amici-petri (Mikoláš) Mosyakin, Fedor. & McNeill
- It is endemic to the Čierna hora Mountains, Slovakia

Synonyms
- Karpatiosorbus amici-petri (Mikoláš) Sennikov & Kurtto; Pyrus amici-petri (Mikoláš) M.F.Fay & Christenh.; Sorbus amici-petri Mikoláš

Species of tree in the family Rosaceae

Aria amici-petri is an apomictic species of tree in the family Rosaceae endemic to the Čierna Hora, Slovakia. It is an endangered species.

== Description ==
=== Vegetative characteristics ===
Aria amici-petri is a 5–7 m tall shrub or tree with a wide crown bearing widely opening branches. The trunk bears grey, smooth, longitudinally fissured bark with numerous rhomboid lenticels. The new shoots are chestnut brown, turning purple-greyish-brown, and finally grey with age. The ovoid leaf buds with an acute apex 7.0–9.0 mm long, and 3.0–4.0 mm wide. The buds of the inflorescence are 10.0–12.0 mm long, and 5.0–6.0 mm wide. The olivaceous greenish, lightly yellowish-brown, or orange-brown bud scales have a deep-brown, sparsely hirsute, 0.5–0.8 mm wide margin. The broadly ovate to rhombic, lobed, 90–105 mm long, and 75–90 mm wide leaves with a serrate to biserrate margin have 12–13 pairs of lateral veins. The adaxial leaf surface is glabrous, and the white abaxial leaf surface is tomentose. The base is broadly cuneate, rounded, or truncate. The tomentose petiole is 15–25 mm long. The leaves turn yellow and later brown in autumn, and the primary vein turns purplish to reddish-purple.

=== Generative characteristics ===
The dense, corymbose, 85–100 mm wide inflorescence bears 30–60 sweetly fragrant flowers. The hypanthium is tomentose and turbinate. The flower buds are 7–8 mm long. The tomentose pedicels later become glabrescent. The 16–18 mm wide flowers have tomentose, triangular, 3.0–4.0 mm long, and 3.0–3.5 mm wide sepals. The broadly ovate to round, concave, greenish-white to yellowish white, 7.5–8.5 mm long, and 5.0–6.0 mm wide, clawed petals are basally tomentose on the adaxial surface. The 16–20 stamens with 3.3–6.0 mm long filaments have 1.5–1.8 mm long, yellowish to rosy anthers. The pollen is highly viable. The hirsute ovary is semi-inferior. The 2 partially fused, 3.5–4.5 mm long, basally hairy styles have flat or slightly concave stigmas. The infrutescence bears 10–18 red to orange, globose, 11.0–13.0 mm long, and 13.0–14.0 mm wide, apically tomentose fruits with 120–170 lenticels per fruit. The bright orange mesocarp is soft, mealy textured, and heterogenous. The endocarp is cartilagineous to membranaceous. The fruit produces 1–3 seeds. The fuscous seeds are 6.0–6.5 mm long, and 2.5–2.8 mm wide. The seed production rate is low and most seeds are produced apomictically, but some are produced sexually.

=== Cytology ===
The chromosome count is 2n = 4x = 68. It is tetraploid.

== Taxonomy ==
It was first described as Sorbus amici-petri Mikoláš by Vlastimil Mikoláš in 2004. It was moved to the genus Aria (Pers.) J.Jacq. ex Host as Aria amici-petri (Mikoláš) Mosyakin, Fedor. & McNeill by Sergei Leonidovich Mosyakin, Mykola Mykhaylovych Fedoronchuk, and John McNeill in 2025. The type specimen was collected by V. Mikoláš in a forest-steppe in Eastern Slovakia on the 22 September 2002. Aria amici-petri is believed to have arisen by the hybridisation of Aria torminalis and Aria thaiszii s.l.

=== Etymology ===
The specific epithet amici-petri from amici meaning friend and petri meaning Peter honours the authors friend Peter Černaj, who died prematurely.

== Distribution and habitat ==
It is endemic to the Čierna hora Mountains in eastern Slovakia, where it occurs in a single area of 12 km^{2} growing in forest steppes, in oak-hornbeam forests, and in shrubland at altitudes of 250–400 m above sea level.

== Conservation ==
Aria amici-petri is an endangered species with a small, but stable population of 100 mature trees. In the Red list of ferns and flowering plants of Slovakia, it is categorised as endangered (EN). It is not cultivated in any ex situ conservation collections.
