= Aria colchica =

Scientific classification
- Kingdom: Plantae
- Clade: Tracheophytes
- Clade: Angiosperms
- Clade: Eudicots
- Clade: Rosids
- Order: Rosales
- Family: Rosaceae
- Genus: Aria
- Species: A. colchica

Binomial name
- Aria colchica (Zinserl.) Mezhenskyj
- It is endemic to the Colchic region, Georgia

Synonyms
- Pyrus colchica (Zinserl.) M.F.Fay & Christenh.; Sorbus colchica Zinserl.

Species of tree in the family Rosaceae

Aria colchica is a species of tree in the family Rosaceae endemic to the Colchic region, Georgia.

== Description ==
=== Vegetative characteristics ===
Aria colchica is a tree. The buds have scales with sparsely tomentose margins. The elliptic to ovate-elliptic, 85–100 mm long, and 50–70 mm wide leaves with a biserrate margin have 10–11 pairs of lateral veins. The base is rounded or slightly narrowed, obtuse or nearly acute. The mostly glabrous adaxial leaf surface may be slightly pubescent along the veins, and the greyish-green abaxial leaf surface is slightly tomentose.

=== Generative characteristics ===
The pedicel is glabrous. The globose fruit is red.

=== Cytology ===
The chromosome count is 2n = 68. It is tetraploid.

== Taxonomy ==
It was first described as Sorbus colchica Zinserl. by Iurij Dmitrievitch Zinserling in 1939., It was moved to the genus Aria (Pers.) J.Jacq. ex Host as Aria colchica (Zinserl.) Mezhenskyj by Volodymyr Mykolaiovych Mezhenskyj in 2018, but an error was made in citing the wrong basionym.

=== Etymology ===
The specific epithet colchica refers to the Colchis region in Georgia.

== Distribution and habitat ==
It is endemic to the Colchic region, Georgia, where it occurs in subalpine forests at elevations of 1500–2000 m above sea level.

== Conservation ==
The National Red List Status in Georgia is data deficient (DD).
