= Aria orbiculata =

Scientific classification
- Kingdom: Plantae
- Clade: Tracheophytes
- Clade: Angiosperms
- Clade: Eudicots
- Clade: Rosids
- Order: Rosales
- Family: Rosaceae
- Genus: Aria
- Species: A. orbiculata

Binomial name
- Aria orbiculata (Gabrieljan) Gabrieljan
- It is native to the region from Cyprus to eastern Turkey and Iran

Synonyms
- List: Sorbus orbiculata (Gabrieljan) Gabrieljan; Sorbus umbellata var. orbiculata Gabrieljan; Sorbus cretica f. orbiculata (Zinserl.) Kárpáti; Sorbus graeca var. orbiculata Zinserl.; Sorbus graeca f. orbiculata Kárpáti; Sorbus umbellata var. orbiculata (Kárpáti) Gabrieljan

Species of tree in the family Rosaceae

Aria orbiculata is a species of shrub or tree in the family Rosaceae native to the region from Cyprus to eastern Turkey and Iran.

== Description ==
=== Vegetative characteristics ===
Aria orbiculata is a 2–4 m tall shrub or tree with brown-reddish bark bearing numerous round, white lenticels. The sticky, 8–11 mm long, acute, green buds have a red margin. The 9–11 cm long, orbicular, suborbicular, or broadly elliptic, slightly lobed leaves with slightly irregularly serrated margins has 7–8(–9) lateral veins. The glossy adaxial leaf surface is glabrous, and the greyish-white abaxial leaf surface is tomentose. The leaves of the sterile branches are variable in shape and size. The petiole is pubescent.

=== Generative characteristics ===
The corymbose inflorescence with short branches in the upper part bears 18–20 mm wide flowers. The 4-5 mm long, triangular sepals are woolly. The obovate petals are clawed. The stamens have cream-coloured anthers. The bilocular ovary is semiinferior. The 2 styles are free. The red, globose, 13–15 mm wide fruit bears numerous white, round lenticels. The 8–9 mm long, elliptic-triangular seeds are dark brown. Flowering occurs from May until June, and fruiting occurs from September until October.

=== Cytology ===
The chromosome count in 2n = 2x = 34. It is diploid.

== Taxonomy ==
It was first described as Sorbus umbellata var. orbiculata Gabrieljan by Elenora Tzolakovna Gabrieljan in 1978. It was moved to the genus Aria (Pers.) J.Jacq. ex Host as Aria orbiculata (Gabrieljan) Gabrieljan by Elenora Tzolakovna Gabrieljan in 2019. The type specimen was collected by E. Gabrielian in Zangezur, Armenia on the 26 August 1952.

=== Etymology ===
The specific epithet orbiculata means round or disc-shaped.

== Distribution and habitat ==
It is native to Cyprus, Iran, Iraq, Turkmenistan, Turkey, Armenia, Georgia, and Azerbaijan, where it grows on rocky slopes, oak forests, and shrubbery on limestone at elevations of 1400–2500 m above sea level.
