= Aria veszpremensis =

Conservation status
- Vulnerable (IUCN 3.1)

Scientific classification
- Kingdom: Plantae
- Clade: Tracheophytes
- Clade: Angiosperms
- Clade: Eudicots
- Clade: Rosids
- Order: Rosales
- Family: Rosaceae
- Genus: Aria
- Species: A. veszpremensis

Binomial name
- Aria veszpremensis (Barabits) Mosyakin, Fedor. & McNeill
- It is endemic to the Bakony Mountains, Hungary

Synonyms
- Karpatiosorbus veszpremensis (Barabits) Sennikov & Kurtto; Pyrus veszpremensis (Barabits) M.F.Fay & Christenh.; Sorbus veszpremensis Barabits

Species of tree in the family Rosaceae

Aria veszpremensis is a species of tree in the family Rosaceae endemic to the Bakony Mountains, Hungary. It is vulnerable to extinction.

== Description ==
=== Vegetative characteristics ===
Aria veszpremensis is a 4–6 m tall tree or shrub with erect branches bearing glossy, brownish twigs with small, brown lenticels. The conical buds with greenish scales have tomentose, brown and grey margins. The rhombic or deltoid, lobed, 7–9 cm long, and 5–7 cm wide leaves with a serrate margin are broadest at the middle or slightly below. The base of the lamina is cuneate or sometimes slightly rounded. The apex of the lamina and of the lobes is acuminate. The relatively long, narrow, and acute leaf lobes are up to 6–8 mm long. The leaf has 8–12 lateral veins. The abaxial leaf surface is tomentose with a greenish-gray hairs. The slim petiole is 20–30 mm long.

=== Generative characteristics ===
The flower is white. The slightly elongated, orange-brown to reddish, 12-13 mm long, and 10-12 mm wide fruit bears small, dark, round lenticels. The reddish-brown seed 4–5 mm long, and 2 mm wide.

=== Cytology ===
The chromosome count is 2n = 34?.

== Taxonomy ==
It was first described as Sorbus veszpremensis Barabits by Elemér Barabits in 2007. It was moved to the genus Aria (Pers.) J.Jacq. ex Host as Aria veszpremensis (Barabits) Mosyakin, Fedor. & McNeill by Sergei Leonidovich Mosyakin, Mykola Mykhaylovych Fedoronchuk, and John McNeill in 2025.

=== Etymology ===
The specific epithet veszpremensis refers to the town of Veszprém, Hungary, which is near to where this species grows.

== Distribution and habitat ==
It is endemic to the Bakony Mountains, Hungary, where it occurs in a small area of less than 1 km^{2} (area of occupancy), where it grows on shallow dolomite and rendzina soils in mixed scrub forests.

== Conservation ==
Aria veszpremensis is a vulnerable species with a small population of 250–999 mature trees. The population is more or less stable and strong. In the Red List of threatened tree and shrub species of Hungary, it is also categorised as vulnerable. It is cultivated in the ex situ conservation collection of the Budai Arborétum, as well as in a private nursery.
