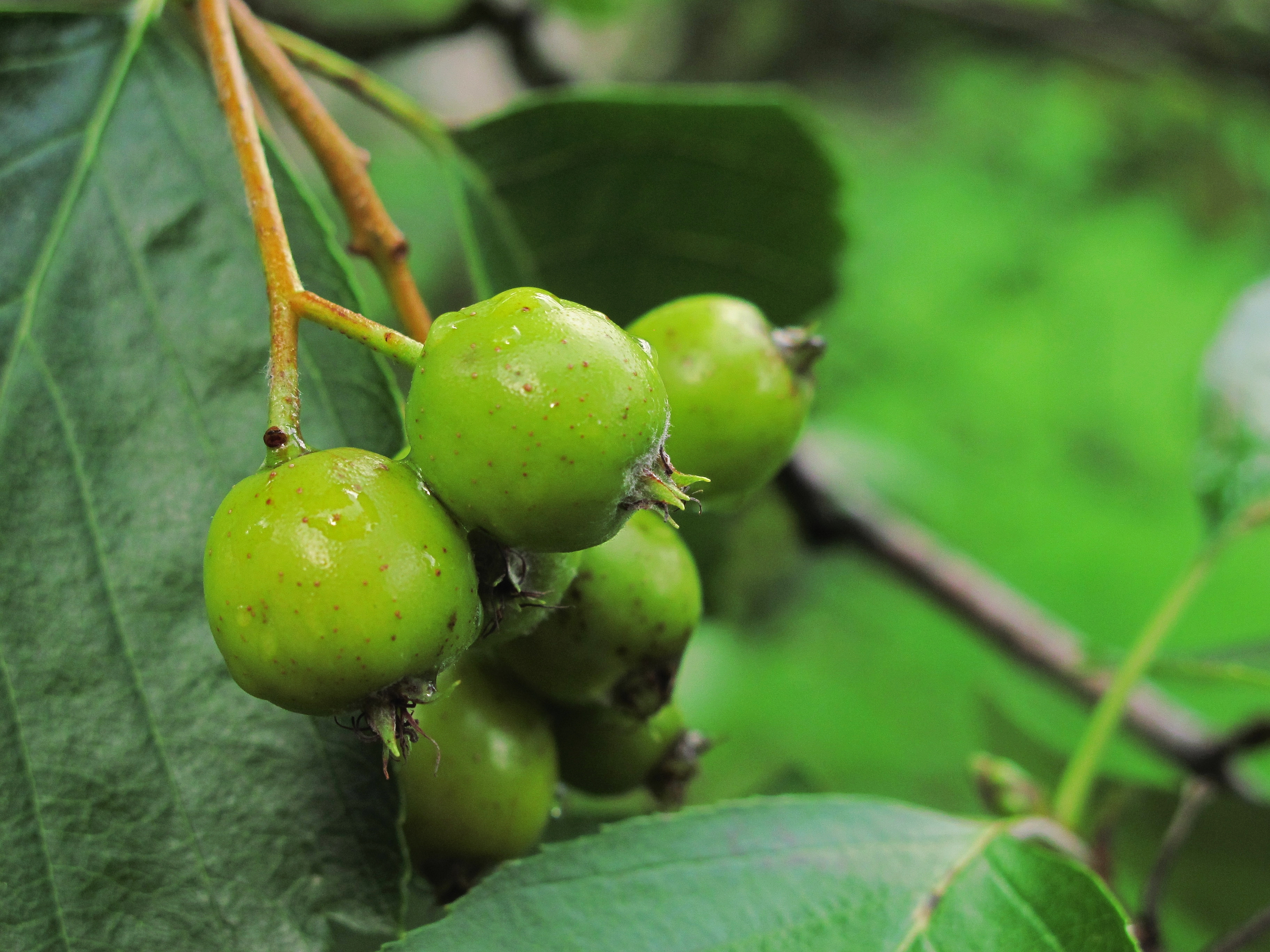
- Unripe fruits of Aria franconica

Conservation status
- Vulnerable (IUCN 3.1)

Scientific classification
- Kingdom: Plantae
- Clade: Tracheophytes
- Clade: Angiosperms
- Clade: Eudicots
- Clade: Rosids
- Order: Rosales
- Family: Rosaceae
- Genus: Aria
- Species: A. franconica

Binomial name
- Aria franconica (Bornm.) Mosyakin, Fedor. & McNeill

Synonyms
- Karpatiosorbus franconica (Bornm.) Sennikov & Kurtto; Pyrus franconica (Bornm.) M.F.Fay & Christenh.; Sorbus franconica Bornm.; Sorbus franconica f. oxylopha Bornm.; Sorbus franconica f. truncata Bornm.

= Aria franconica =

Species of plant

Aria franconica is a species of flowering plant in the family Rosaceae. It is a tree endemic to Little Switzerland in North-Bavaria, Germany. It grows in open pine forest, on rock outcrops, and on the edges of deciduous forest from 450 to 520 metres elevation.
