= Aria umbellata =

Conservation status
- Least Concern (IUCN 3.1)

Scientific classification
- Kingdom: Plantae
- Clade: Tracheophytes
- Clade: Angiosperms
- Clade: Eudicots
- Clade: Rosids
- Order: Rosales
- Family: Rosaceae
- Genus: Aria
- Species: A. umbellata

Binomial name
- Aria umbellata (Desf.) Sennikov & Kurtto
- It is native to the region from southeastern Europe to the Caucasus.

Synonyms
- List: Crataegus umbellata Desf.; Pyrus umbellifera M.F.Fay & Christenh.; Sorbus aria var. umbellata (Desf.) Halácsy; Sorbus aria subsp. umbellata (Desf.) Hayek; Sorbus umbellata (Desf.) Fritsch; Aria flabellifolia (Spach) M.Roem.; Crataegus flabellifolia Spach; Hahnia aria var. flabellifolia (Spach) Dippel; Pyrus aria var. flabellifolia (Spach) Franch.; Pyrus meridionalis proles flabellifolia (Spach) Asch. & Graebn.; Pyrus turcica (Zinserl.) M.F.Fay & Christenh.; Sorbus aria var. flabellifolia (Spach) Wenz.; Sorbus aria subsp. koevessii Pénzes; Sorbus aria var. kovassii (Pénzes) Stoj., Stef. & Kitan.; Sorbus banatica (Jáv.) Prodan; Sorbus cretica f. banatica Jáv.; Sorbus cretica var. banatica (Jáv.) Buia; Sorbus cretica subsp. banatica (Jáv.) Jáv.; Sorbus flabellifolia (Spach) S.Schauer; Sorbus graeca var. banatica (Jáv.) Kovanda; Sorbus graeca var. turcica (Zinserl.) Gabrieljan; Sorbus turcica Zinserl.; Sorbus umbellata subsp. banatica (Jáv.) Kárpáti; Sorbus umbellata f. cuneata Diap.; Sorbus umbellata subsp. flabellifolia (Spach) Kárpáti; Sorbus umbellata var. flabellifolia (Spach) C.K.Schneid.; Sorbus umbellata var. graeca C.K.Schneid.; Sorbus umbellata subsp. koevessii (Pénzes) Kárpáti

Species of tree in the family Rosaceae

Aria umbellata, the umbellate whitebeam, is a species of tree in the family Rosaceae native to the region from southeastern Europe to the Caucasus.

== Description ==
=== Vegetative characteristics ===
Aria umbellata is a deciduous, 1–5 m tall shrub or tree with a rounded crown and a relatively slim trunk. The light grey bark is smooth. The very hard wood is orange when freshly cut, but later becomes pale yellow after drying out. The reddish brown, lenticellate twigs are glabrous. The buds are slightly sticky. The leaf scars on the twigs are crescent-shaped. The simple, ovate to rounded or rhombic, slightly lobed, 4–7 cm long, and 3–6.5 cm wide leaves have 4–7 pairs of lateral veins. The adaxial leaf surface is dark green and the white abaxial leaf surface is tomentose. The leaf base is rounded or cuneate and the leaf apex is obtuse. The tomentose petiole is 5–20 mm long.

=== Generative characteristics ===
The 3.5–7 cm long, and 4.5–9 cm wide, loose or compact inflorescence with tomentose branchlets bears 14–42 white, 15 mm wide, pleasantly fragrant flowers. The 5-lobed calyx with narrowly triangular, 2 mm long sepals is tomentose. The obovate petals are 7–9 mm long, and 4 mm wide. The 5 mm long stamens with glabrous filaments have oblong, 0.8 mm long, pink anthers. The spheroidal pollen is 36–40 µm long, and 41–50 µm wide. The (1–)2(–3) free styles are basally pubescent. The 13–16 mm long and 6–16 mm wide, ovoid to globose, yellowish to scarlet red fruit with persistent sepals bears conspicuous or inconspicuous lenticels. The 3–4 triangular, brown seeds are 6–7 mm long. Flowering occurs in late May or early June and fruiting occurs towards autumn. Accounts of the fruit's taste differ: it has been described both as unpleasant and as pleasant.

== Taxonomy ==
It was first described as Crataegus umbellata Desf. by René Louiche Desfontaines in 1829. It was moved to the genus Aria (Pers.) J.Jacq. ex Host as Aria umbellata (Desf.) Sennikov & Kurtto by Alexander Nikolaevitsch Sennikov and Arto Kurtto in 2017.

=== Etymology ===
The specific epithet umbellata means having umbels.

== Distribution and habitat ==
It is native to Albania, Bulgaria, Greece (including Crete), Iraq, Lebanon, Syria, Romania, Turkey, the Transcaucasus, Kosovo, North Macedonia, and Serbia, where it occurs on rocky terrain, stony mountain slopes, in cliffs, forest margins, and in woodland. Its presence in Tunisia and in Sicily, Italy is disputed.

== Ecology ==
The leaves are affected by the fungus species Gymnosporangium cornutum. The flowers are pollinated by insects and the fruit is eaten by birds. The leaves are eaten by insects, such as moths.

== Conservation ==
Aria umbellata is a species of least concern. It is locally impacted by grazing animals, such as goats. It is cultivated in several living collections in botanic gardens.

== Uses ==
It is cultivated as an ornamental plant, but it is uncommon in cultivation. It is an ornamental tree with attractive fruits and a rounded crown. The wood is used for tool handles.
