= Aria moenofranconica =

Scientific classification
- Kingdom: Plantae
- Clade: Tracheophytes
- Clade: Angiosperms
- Clade: Eudicots
- Clade: Rosids
- Order: Rosales
- Family: Rosaceae
- Genus: Aria
- Species: A. moenofranconica

Binomial name
- Aria moenofranconica (N.Mey. & Meierott) Mosyakin, Fedor. & McNeill
- It is endemic to Bavaria, Germany

Synonyms
- Karpatiosorbus moenofranconica (N.Mey. & Meierott) N.Mey.; Sorbus moenofranconica N.Mey. & Meierott

Species of tree in the family Rosaceae

Aria moenofranconica, the Main-Franconian whitebeam, is an apomictic species of tree in the family Rosaceae endemic to Bavaria, Germany. It is extremely rare.

== Description ==
=== Vegetative characteristics ===
Aria moenofranconica is an up to 10 m tall shrub or tree with smooth, grey bark. The ovoid buds have greenish brown, glabrescent scales with sparsely tomentose margins. The simple, broadly oval to roundish, lobed, uniform, thin-textured leaves with a slightly acuminate apex are 6.5–10.0 cm long, and 5.5– 7.0 cm wide. The base is cuneate. The dull, light green adaxial leaf surface is initially tomentose. The grey-green abaxial leaf surface is tomentose. The leaf has 9–10 lateral veins. The tomentose petiole is 16–21 mm long.

=== Generative characteristics ===
The compact, cylindroid inflorescence with tomentose branchlets bears 18 mm wide flowers. The triangular, acute sepals are tomentose. The broadly elliptical, spoon-shaped, white, 7 mm long, and 5 mm wide petals are basally pubescent with wooly, 2.5 mm long trichomes on the adaxial surface, but are glabrous on the abaxial surface. The 20 stamens have cream-coloured anthers. The semi-inferior ovary is greyish-tomentose. The 2 glabrous styles are partially fused. The bluntly cylindrical or globose, leathery-brown accessory fruit with lenticels is 13–15 mm long, and 11–12 mm wide. Flowering occurs from April until May and the fruits ripen in September.

=== Cytology ===
The chromosome count is 2n = 3x = 51. It is triploid.

== Taxonomy ==
It was first described as Sorbus moenofranconica N.Mey. & Meierott by Norbert Meyer and Lenz Meierott in 2021. It was moved to the genus Aria (Pers.) J.Jacq. ex Host as Aria moenofranconica (N.Mey. & Meierott) Mosyakin, Fedor. & McNeill by Sergei Leonidovich Mosyakin, Mykola Mykhaylovych Fedoronchuk, and John McNeill in 2025. The type specimen was collected on the 29 May 2021 by N.Meyer on the forest edge between the two vineyards north of the dirt road, southern edge of the Mühlholz between Holzkirchen and Remlingen, Bavaria, Germany, at an elevation of 323 m above sea level.

=== Etymology ===
The specific epithet moenofranconica refers to Mainfranken, Germany.

== Distribution and habitat ==
Aria moenofranconica is endemic to Bavaria, Germany, where it grows on open forested hills, at the edges of forests, and in open pine forests. It prefers base-rich substrates on calcareous ground.

== Conservation ==
It has a small population of about 200 trees. In the 2024 Bavarian Red List, it is categorised as extremely rare (R). It is cultivated in the ex situ conservation collection of the Freiburg Botanical Garden.
