= Aria magocsyana =

Conservation status
- Endangered (IUCN 3.1)

Scientific classification
- Kingdom: Plantae
- Clade: Tracheophytes
- Clade: Angiosperms
- Clade: Eudicots
- Clade: Rosids
- Order: Rosales
- Family: Rosaceae
- Genus: Aria
- Species: A. magocsyana

Binomial name
- Aria magocsyana (Kárpáti) Mosyakin, Fedor. & McNeill
- It is endemic to the Prešov Region, Slovakia

Synonyms
- Karpatiosorbus magocsyana (Kárpáti) Sennikov & Kurtto; Pyrus magocsyana (Kárpáti) M.F.Fay & Christenh.; Sorbus magocsyana Kárpáti

Species of tree in the family Rosaceae

Aria magocsyana is an apomictic species of tree in the family Rosaceae endemic to the Prešov Region, Slovakia. It is an endangered species.

== Description ==
Aria magocsyana is a large shrub or a small tree. The broadly rhombic-ovate, lobed, 8–9 cm long, and 7–7.5 cm wide leaves with a serrate margin have a cuneate base. The abaxial leaf surface is densely gray-tomentose. The lobes are 5–10 mm long.

== Taxonomy ==
It was first validly described as Sorbus magocsyana Kárpáti by Zoltan Kárpáti in 2010. It was previously invalidly published as Sorbus magocsyana Kárpáti by Zoltan Kárpáti in 1966, which was invalid because the type specimen was not indicated. It was moved to the genus Aria (Pers.) J.Jacq. ex Host as Aria magocsyana (Kárpáti) Mosyakin, Fedor. & McNeill by Sergei Leonidovich Mosyakin, Mykola Mykhaylovych Fedoronchuk, and John McNeill in 2025. The type specimen was collected by S. Mágocsy-Dietz in the Zemplén Mountains, Homonna, Podskalka, Slovakia in August 1877. The holotype specimen, consisting of one poor fragment of a sterile short shoot and a number of loose leaves, is not an ideal basis for a proper circumscription of the species.

=== Etymology ===
The specific epithet magocsyana honours the collector S. Mágocsy-Dietz.

== Distribution and habitat ==
It is endemic to the Sokol Mountain and nearby Červená skala, in eastern Slovakia, where it occurs in a very small area of less than 0.1 km^{2} growing on cliffs and the forest edge.

== Conservation ==
Aria magocsyana is an endangered species with a small population of only 51–100 mature trees restricted to a very small area. Currently there are no known threats, and it grows within a nature reserve. It isn't grown in any ex situ conservation collections.
