= Aria griseotormaria =

- Aria griseotormaria growing in Retzstadt, Lower Franconia, Germany

Scientific classification
- Kingdom: Plantae
- Clade: Tracheophytes
- Clade: Angiosperms
- Clade: Eudicots
- Clade: Rosids
- Order: Rosales
- Family: Rosaceae
- Genus: Aria
- Species: A. griseotormaria

Binomial name
- Aria griseotormaria (N.Mey. & Meierott) Mosyakin, Fedor. & McNeill
- It is endemic to Bavaria, Germany

Synonyms
- Karpatiosorbus griseotormaria (N.Mey. & Meierott) N.Mey.; Sorbus griseotormaria N.Mey. & Meierott

Species of tree in the family Rosaceae

Aria griseotormaria is an apomictic species of tree in the family Rosaceae endemic to endemic to Bavaria, Germany. It is a highly threatened species.

== Description ==
Aria griseotormaria growing in its natural habitat in Retzstadt, Germany

=== Vegetative characteristics ===
Aria griseotormaria is an up to 16 m tall shrub or tree with smooth, grey bark. The ovoid, pointed, 6–8 mm long buds have glabrescent, reddish brown scales with sparsely tomentose margins. The simple, coriaceous, triangularly lobed, broadly lanceolate to roundish-rhombic, 9–10 cm long, and 9–10 cm wide leaves have 7–9 lateral veins. The apex is acute and the base is cuneate. The sparsely tomentose adaxial leaf surface is dark green, and the tomentose abaxial leaf surface is grey. The petiole is 31–35 mm long.

=== Generative characteristics ===
The compact, cylindroid inflorescence with greenish-tomentose branchlets bears white, 12–14 mm wide flowers. The triangular, acute sepals are tomentose on both surfaces. The roundish, spoon-shaped, white, patent, clawed, 5–6 mm long, and 5–6 mm wide petals are basally pubescent on the adaxial surface with 2–3 mm long, woolly, white hairs, but are abaxially glabrous. The 20 stamens have cream-coloured anthers. The greyish-tomentose ovary is semi-inferior. The 2 styles are partially fused. The fertile, pyriform, brown, 13–15 mm long, and 13–15 mm wide fruits bear 1–2 viable seeds. The pedicel is inserted in a light depression of the fruit. The rounder sterile fruits are only 10 mm wide. Flowering occurs from April until May, and the fruit ripens in September.

=== Cytology ===
The chromosome count is 2n = 3x = 51. It is triploid.

== Taxonomy ==
It was first described as Sorbus griseotormaria N.Mey. & Meierott by Norbert Meyer and Lenz Meierott in 2021. It was moved to the genus Aria (Pers.) J.Jacq. ex Host as Aria griseotormaria (N.Mey. & Meierott) Mosyakin, Fedor. & McNeill by Sergei Leonidovich Mosyakin, Mykola Mykhaylovych Fedoronchuk, and John McNeill in 2025. The type specimen was collected on the 5 August 2020 by N. Meyer on the forest edge on the slope of the Neuenberg hill near Retzstadt, Bavaria, Germany at an elevation of 280 m above sea level.

=== Etymology ===
The specific epithet griseotormaria translates to grey torminalis and refers to the strong morphological similarities with Aria torminalis.

== Distribution and habitat ==
It is endemic to Bavaria, Germany, where it occurs in open forest hilltops, at the forest edges, and in sparse pine forests on calcareous ground.

== Conservation ==
Aria griseotormaria is a rare species with a small population of 20 trees. In the Bavarian Red List from 2024, Aria griseotormaria is categorised as a highly threatened species (2).
