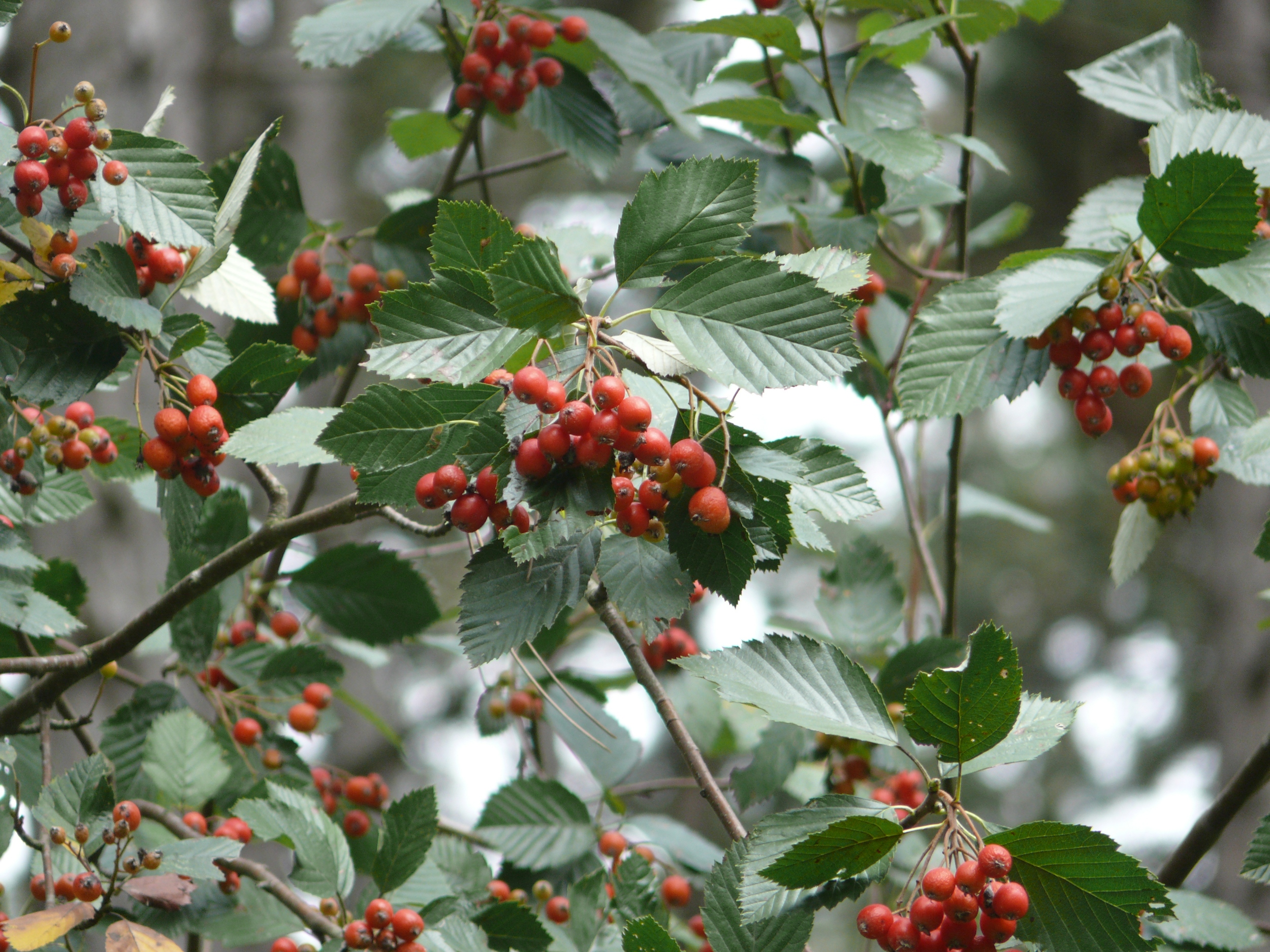
- Fruiting Aria meyeri growing in its natural habitat in the Tauberland, Germany

Conservation status
- Vulnerable (IUCN 3.1)

Scientific classification
- Kingdom: Plantae
- Clade: Embryophytes
- Clade: Tracheophytes
- Clade: Angiosperms
- Clade: Eudicots
- Clade: Rosids
- Order: Rosales
- Family: Rosaceae
- Genus: Aria
- Species: A. meyeri

Binomial name
- Aria meyeri (S.Hammel & Haynold) Mosyakin, Fedor. & McNeill
- It is endemic to Baden-Württemberg and Bavaria, Germany

Synonyms
- Karpatiosorbus meyeri (S.Hammel & Haynold) Sennikov & Kurtto; Pyrus hammelii M.F.Fay & Christenh.; Sorbus meyeri S.Hammel & Haynold

= Aria meyeri =

Species of tree

Aria meyeri, or Meyer's whitebeam, is an apomictic species of tree in the family Rosaceae endemic to Baden-Württemberg and Bavaria, Germany. It is extremely rare and vulnerable to extinction.

== Description ==
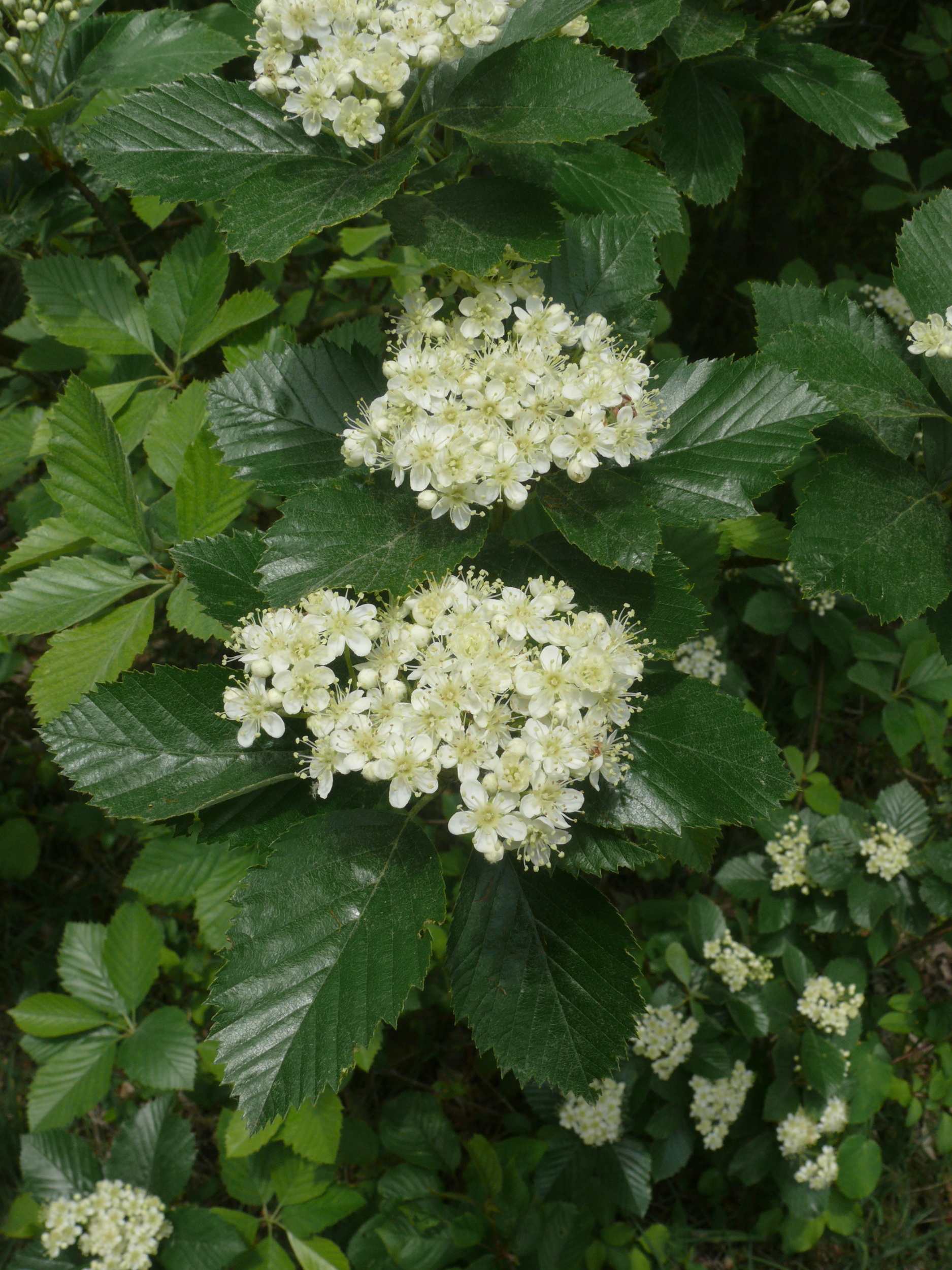
Aria meyeri in flower

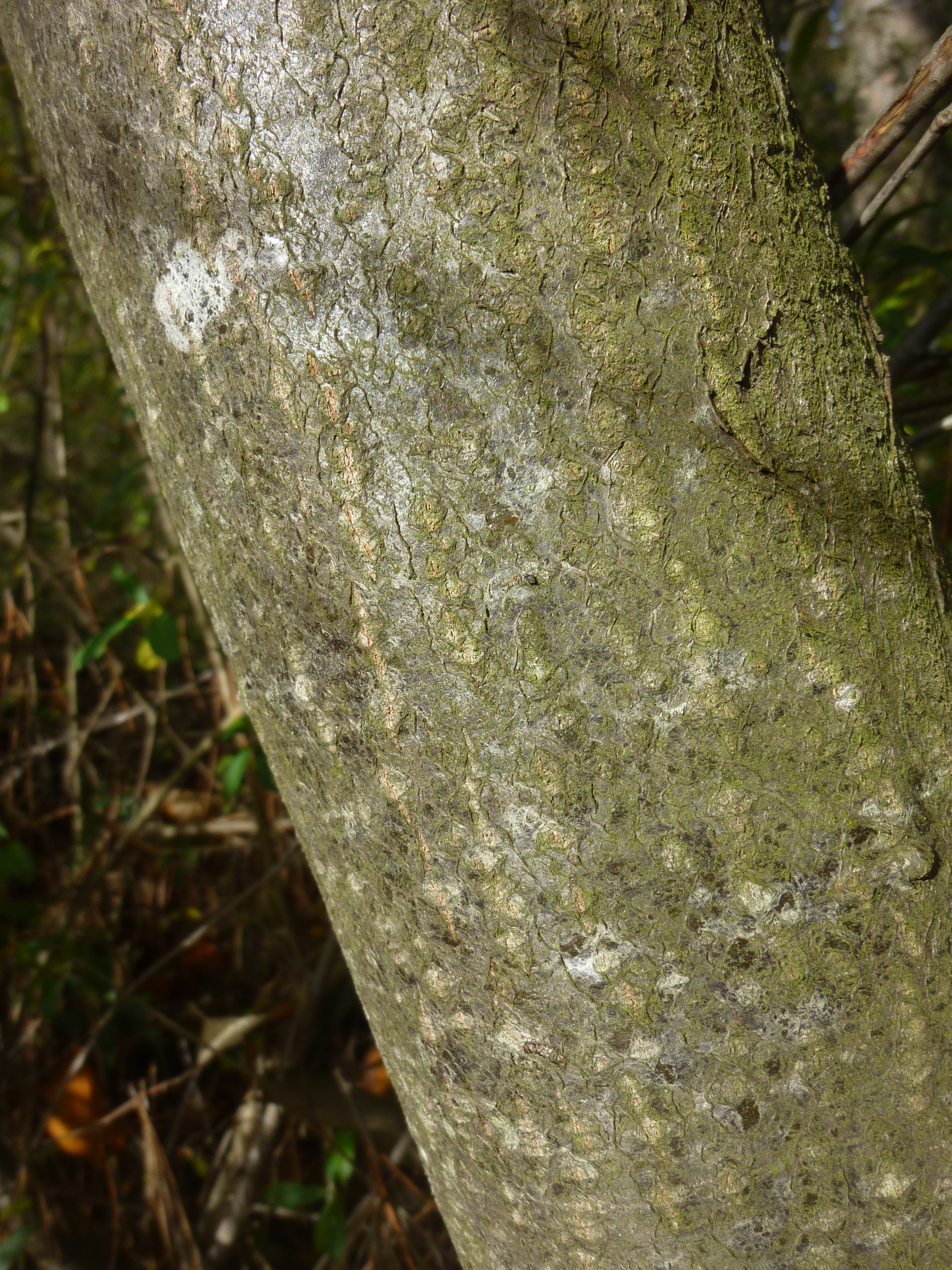
Aria meyeri bark

=== Vegetative characteristics ===
Aria meyeri is an up to 15 m tall occasionally multi-trunked tree or shrub with initially smooth and later fissured greyish brown bark. The trunk circumference at 150 cm height is 90 cm. The petiolate, slightly lobed leaves with a dentate margin are 8–10 cm long, and 5.4–6.6 cm wide. The abaxial leaf surface bears white pubescence.

=== Generative characteristics ===
The 5.5–8.5 cm wide inflorescence bears 30–55 white, 1.6–1.7 cm wide flowers. The flower has 20 white, 5–7 mm long stamens with cream-coloured anthers. The faintly green styles are partially fused. The 12–13 mm long, bright red, oval fruit with up to 170 lenticels bears brown, 5.5 mm long, 2.5 mm wide, and 2 mm high seeds.

=== Cytology ===
It is triploid with a chromosome count of 2n = 51.

== Taxonomy ==
It was first described as Sorbus meyeri S.Hammel & Haynold by Steffen Hammel and Bernd Haynold in 2014. It was moved to the genus Aria (Pers.) J.Jacq. ex Host as Aria meyeri (S.Hammel & Haynold) Mosyakin, Fedor. & McNeill by Sergei Leonidovich Mosyakin, Mykola Mykhaylovych Fedoronchuk, and John McNeill in 2025. The type specimen, which is held in the State Museum of Natural History Stuttgart, was collected on the 12th of May 2013 by Hammel and Haynold in the edge of a forest south of Külsheim, Baden-Württemberg, Germany at an elevation of 380 m above sea level.

=== Etymology ===
The specific epithet meyeri honours the German botanist Norbert Meyer.

== Distribution and habitat ==
It is endemic to Baden-Württemberg and Bavaria, Germany, where it occurs in an area of about 100 km^{2} in pine forests, secondary deciduous forests, forest margins, and pastures at elevations of 280–415 m above sea level.

== Conservation ==
It is a vulnerable species with a restricted distribution and a population of only about 250–999 individuals. Aria meyeri is not specially protected by nature conservation laws, but some of the populations are grow within legally protected areas, or within a military training area. It is not known to be cultivated in any ex-situ conservation collections.
