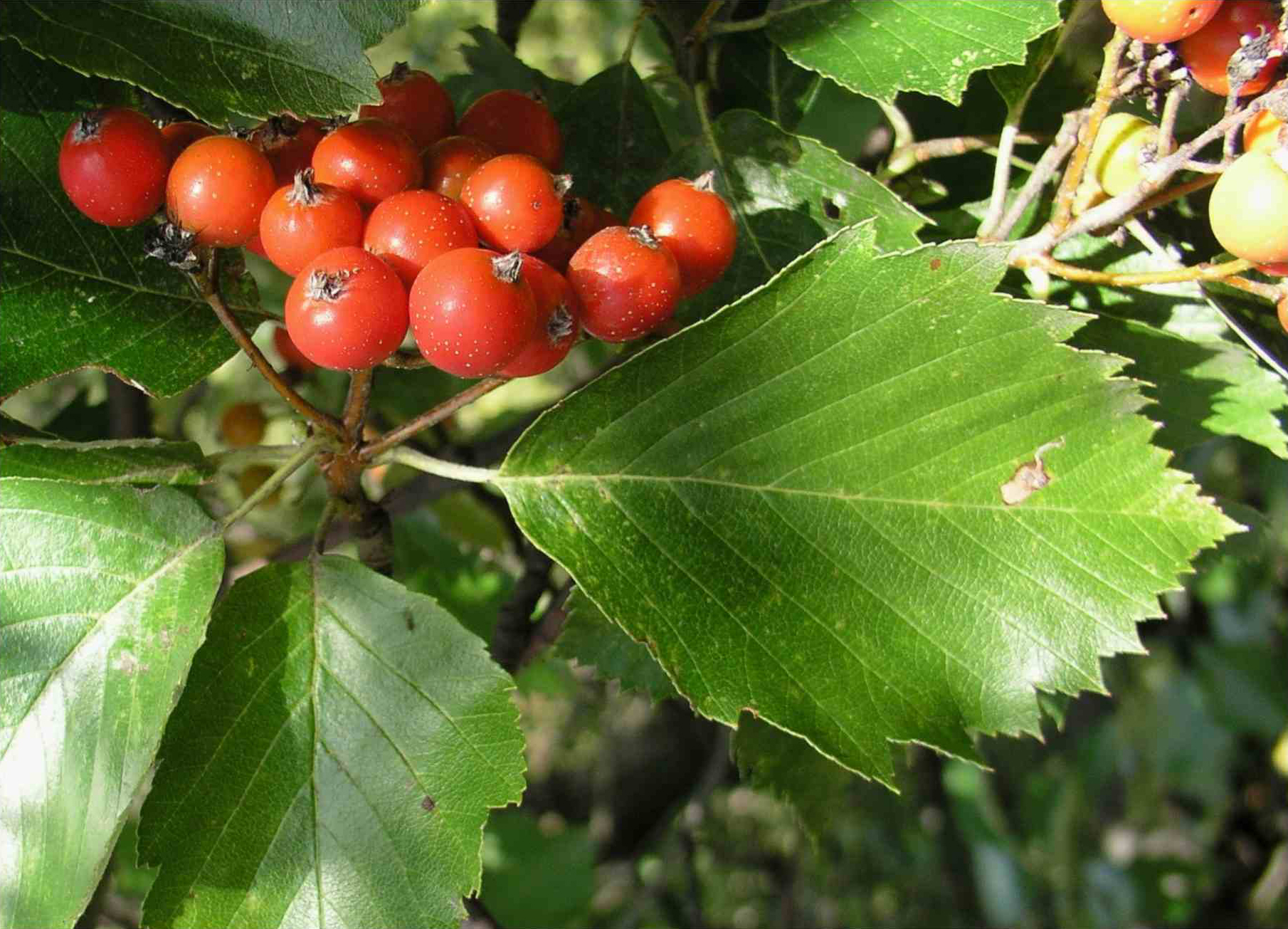
- Fruiting branch of Aria milensis

Conservation status
- Critically Endangered (IUCN 3.1)

Scientific classification
- Kingdom: Plantae
- Clade: Tracheophytes
- Clade: Angiosperms
- Clade: Eudicots
- Clade: Rosids
- Order: Rosales
- Family: Rosaceae
- Genus: Aria
- Species: A. milensis

Binomial name
- Aria milensis (M.Lepší, Boublík, P.Lepší & Vít) Mosyakin, Fedor. & McNeill
- It is endemic to the Milá Hill, Czech Republic

Synonyms
- Karpatiosorbus milensis (M.Lepší, Boublík, P.Lepší & Vít) Sennikov & Kurtto; Pyrus milensis (M.Lepší, Boublík, P.Lepší & Vít) M.F.Fay & Christenh.; Sorbus milensis M.Lepší, Boublík, P.Lepší & Vít

= Aria milensis =

Species of tree in the family Rosaceae

Aria milensis is an apomictic species of tree in the family Rosaceae endemic to the Czech Republic. It is a critically endangered species.

== Description ==
=== Vegetative characteristics ===
Aria milensis is an up to 10 m tall, often multi-trunked, deciduous tree or shrub with an ovoid to broadly ovoid crown. The trunk has grey, initially smooth, but later vertically fissured bark with 7–9 mm long, and 5–8 mm wide lenticels. The fissures appear especially towards the base of the trunk. The twigs are greyish-brown and thick. The young, tomentose, pale brown shoots become glabrescent at maturity. The twigs bear numerous rounded to elliptical lenticels. The ovoid, 8–14 mm long, and 4–7 mm wide buds have green scales with sparsely tomentose margins. The simple, rhomboidal, broadly ovate, or sometimes oval, mostly concave, slightly lobed, glossy, leaves with a biserrate margin are 9.0–10.3 cm long, and 6.8–7.8 cm wide. The apex is acute and the base is cuneate or rounded. The almost glabrous adaxial leaf surface is dark green, and the tomentose abaxial leaf surface is yellowish- greyish-green. The serrate or biserrate lobes are acute or acuminate. The leaf has 10–11 lateral veins. The tomentose petiole is 1.9–2.3 cm long.

=== Generative characteristics ===
The compact, convex, 4.5–7.5 cm wide inflorescence with tomentose branchlets bears 35–65 actinomorphic flowers. The tomentose hypanthium is turbinate. The triangular, acuminate or acute, 3.1–3.6 mm long, and 2.3–2.7 mm wide sepals are tomentose on both surfaces. The 5 white, broadly ovate to roundish, concave, 6.7–7.3 mm long, and 5.1–5.5 mm wide petals are sparsely hirsute at the base of the adaxial surface. The 20 stamens with whitish filaments have 1.4–1.6 mm long, faintly pink anthers. The ovary is semi-inferior. The 2(–3), greenish-cream, partially fused, 4.3–4.7 mm long styles are basally pubescent. The greenish-cream, flat stigma is 0.5–0.6 mm wide. The subglobose, glabrous or nearly glabrous, orange-red, glossy 13–14 mm long, and 14–15 mm wide fruit bears pale brown lenticels. The seeds are brownish grey. Flowering occurs in May.

=== Cytology ===
The chromosome count is 2n = 3x = 51. It is triploid.

== Taxonomy ==
It was first described as Sorbus milensis M.Lepší, Boublík, P.Lepší & Vít by Martin Lepší, Karel Boublík, Petr Lepší & Petr Vít in 2008. It was moved to the genus Aria (Pers.) J.Jacq. ex Host as Aria milensis (M.Lepší, Boublík, P.Lepší & Vít) Mosyakin, Fedor. & McNeill by Sergei Leonidovich Mosyakin, Mykola Mykhaylovych Fedoronchuk, and John McNeill in 2025. The type specimen was collected on the 16 May 2002 by M. Lepší in the village of Milá, distr. Louny, Northern Bohemia, Czech Republic at an elevation of 450 m.

=== Etymology ===
The specific epithet milensis refers to the Milá hill in the České středohoří Mountains, Czech Republic.

== Distribution and habitat ==
It is endemic to the Milá Hill in the Central Bohemian Uplands, Czech Republic, where it occurs in a very small area of only 4 km^{2} growing on screes, rocks, in thermophilous scree forests, and in ravines at elevations of 385–490 m above sea level. Most individuals grow on the south-eastern slope of the hill. It grows alongside Fraxinus excelsior.

== Conservation ==
It is a critically endangered species with a small population of 19 saplings and 38 mature trees. In the national Red List of the Czech Republic from 2017, it is categorised as C1b – critically threatened taxon, rare and declining. It is not legally protected, but the entire population grows within the Milá Nature Reserve. It is mainly threatened by its low polulation size, as well as by the expanding populations of Fraxinus excelsior into rocky habitats. The population shows low levels of renewal, possibly due to grazing mouflons. It is grown in the ex situ conservation collection of the Zoological and Botanical Garden of the City Plzen and in the Dendrologická zahrada Průhonice.
