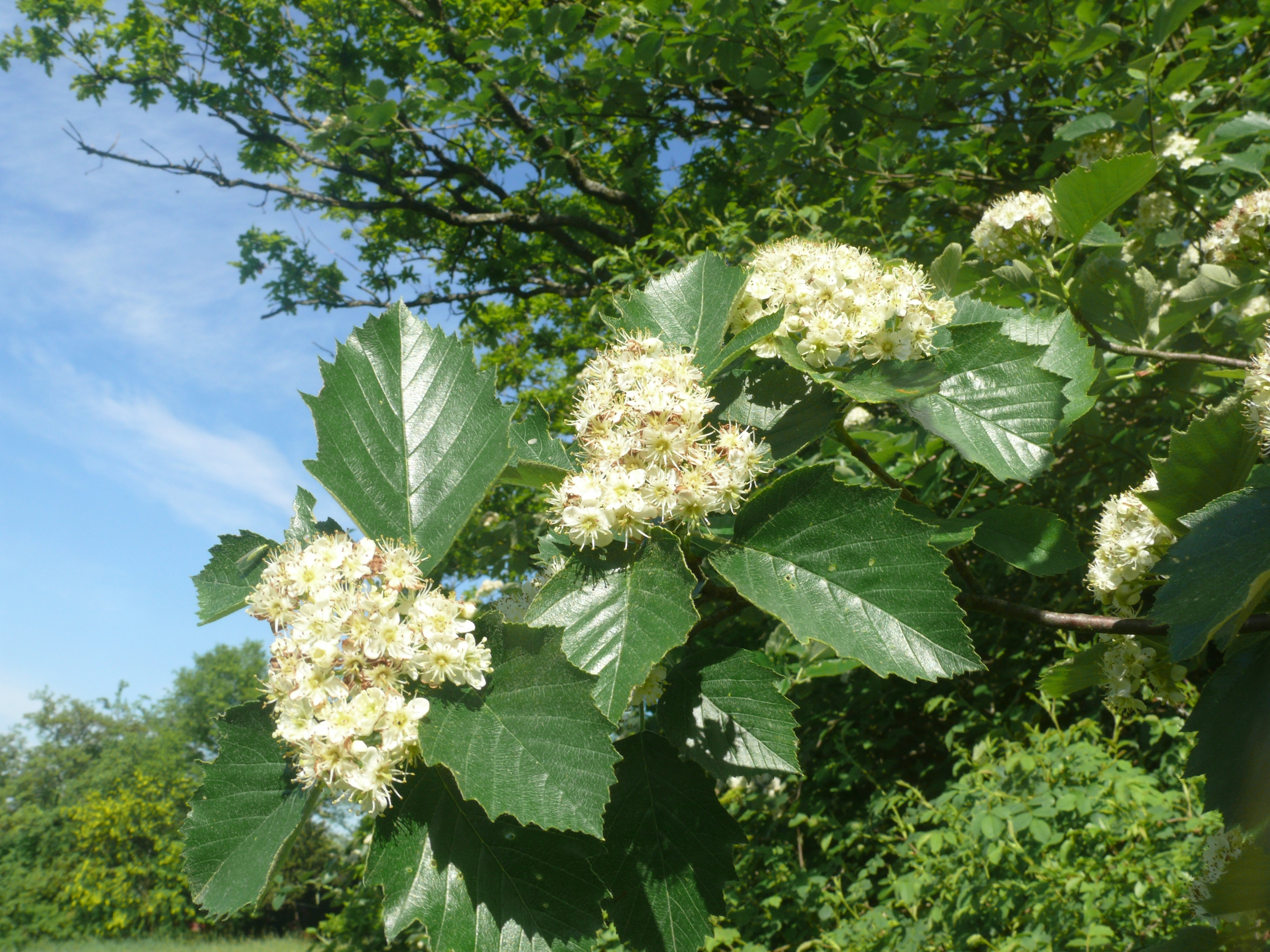
- Flowering Aria puellarum in Mainfranken, Germany

Conservation status
- Endangered (IUCN 3.1)

Scientific classification
- Kingdom: Plantae
- Clade: Tracheophytes
- Clade: Angiosperms
- Clade: Eudicots
- Clade: Rosids
- Order: Rosales
- Family: Rosaceae
- Genus: Aria
- Species: A. puellarum

Binomial name
- Aria puellarum (Meierott) Mosyakin, Fedor. & McNeill
- It is endemic to Bavaria, Germany

Synonyms
- Karpatiosorbus puellarum (Meierott) Sennikov & Kurtto; Pyrus puellarum (Meierott) M.F.Fay & Christenh.; Sorbus puellarum Meierott

= Aria puellarum =

Species of tree in the family Rosaceae

Aria puellarum is an apomictic species of tree in the family Rosaceae endemic to Bavaria, Germany. It is an extremely rare and endangered species.

== Description ==
Fruiting branch of Aria puellarum

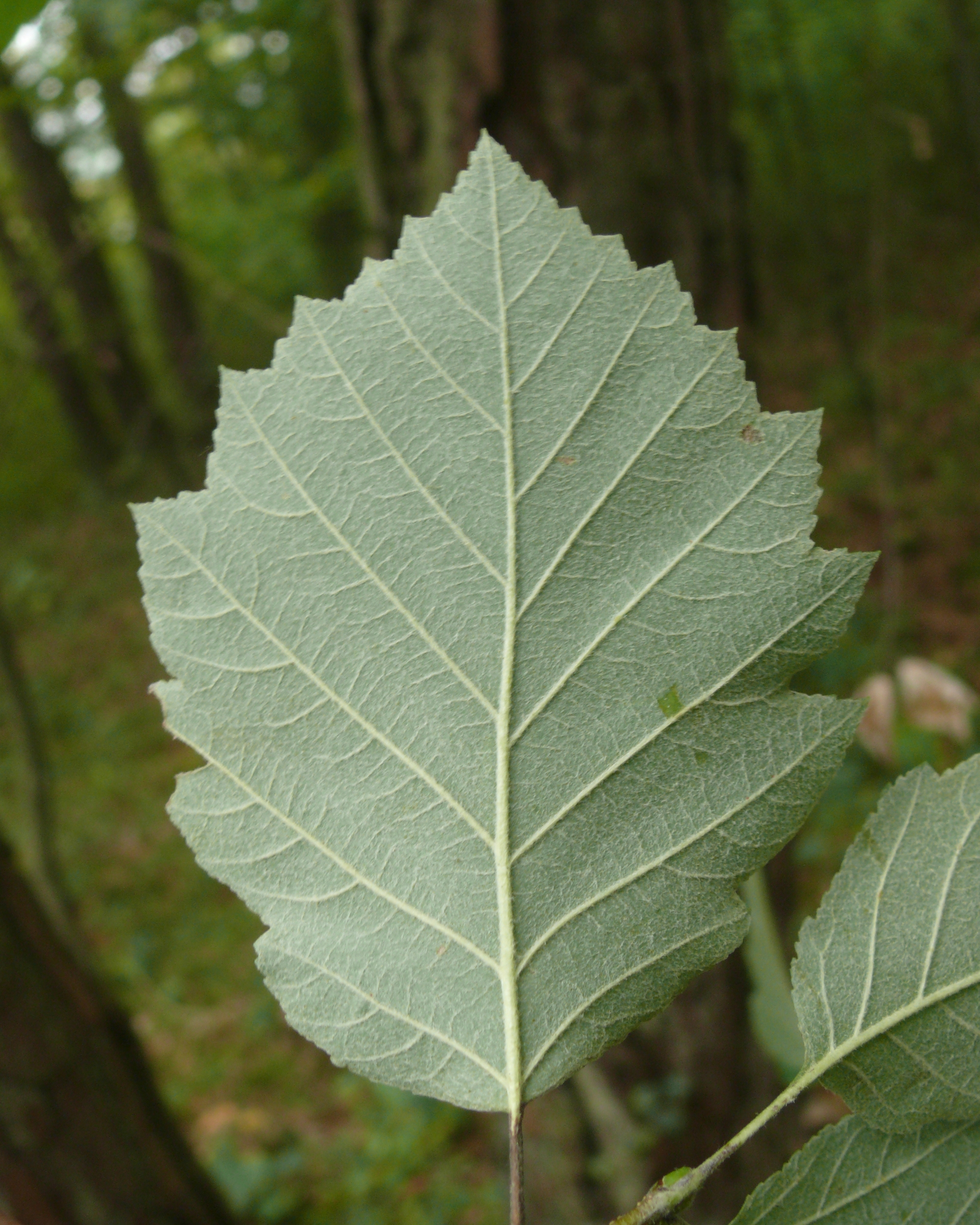
Underside of Aria puellarum leaf

=== Vegetative characteristics ===
Aria puellarum is a 5–6 m tall tree or shrub. The rounded, dark green, lobed leaves have a rounded to cuneate base. The abaxial leaf surface is tomentose with grey hairs.

=== Generative characteristics ===
The sepals are 2 mm long. The petals are white. The styles are basally fused. The yellowish orange to red accessory fruit is globose.

=== Cytology ===
The chromosome count is 2n = 4x = 68. It is tetraploid.

== Taxonomy ==
It was first described as Sorbus puellarum Meierott by Lenz Meierott in 2005. It was moved to the genus Aria (Pers.) J.Jacq. ex Host as Aria puellarum (Meierott) Mosyakin, Fedor. & McNeill by Sergei Leonidovich Mosyakin, Mykola Mykhaylovych Fedoronchuk, and John McNeill in 2025. The type specimen was collected on the 18 May 2001 by N. Meyer, L. Meierott, and O. Angerer between Uettingen and Roßbrunn, Germany.

=== Etymology ===
The specific epithet puellarum means girlish or girl.

== Distribution and habitat ==
It is endemic to Bavaria, Germany, where it occurs in four locations with a total area of 24 km^{2} in open pine forests and on the edges of deciduous forests at elevations of 280–320 m above sea level.

== Conservation ==
Aria puellarum is an endangered species with a small population of 90 mature trees and 100 saplings. It is not protected by law. It is cultivated in the ex situ conservation collections of the Botanischer Garten der Universität Regensburg and the private collection of Karsten Horn.
