= Aria latisedes =

Scientific classification
- Kingdom: Plantae
- Clade: Tracheophytes
- Clade: Angiosperms
- Clade: Eudicots
- Clade: Rosids
- Order: Rosales
- Family: Rosaceae
- Genus: Aria
- Species: A. latisedes

Binomial name
- Aria latisedes (N.Mey. & Meierott) Mosyakin, Fedor. & McNeill
- It is endemic to Bavaria, Germany

Synonyms
- Karpatiosorbus latisedes (N.Mey. & Meierott) N.Mey.; Sorbus latisedes N.Mey. & Meierott

Species of tree

Aria latisedes is an apomictic species of tree in the family Rosaceae endemic to Bavaria, Germany. It is extremely rare.

== Description ==
=== Vegetative characteristics ===
Aria latisedes is an up to 10 m tall tree or shrub with grey, smooth bark. The simple, petiolate, coriaceous leaves have 10–11 lateral veins. The adaxial surface is initially pubescent with grey hairs, but later becomes more green and glossy. The abaxial leaf surface is densely pubescent with grey to white hairs.

=== Generative characteristics ===
The compact, cylindroid, only slightly convex inflorescence has tomentose branches. The globose, dark red to brown accessory fruit bears tiny lenticels. Seeds are mostly produced apomictically, but may also be produced sexually.

=== Cytology ===
The chromosome count is 2n = 4x = 68. It is tetraploid.

== Taxonomy ==
It was first described as Sorbus latisedes N.Mey. & Meierott by Norbert Meyer and Lenz Meierott in 2021. It was moved to the genus Aria (Pers.) J.Jacq. ex Host as Aria latisedes (N.Mey. & Meierott) Mosyakin, Fedor. & McNeill by Sergei Leonidovich Mosyakin, Mykola Mykhaylovych Fedoronchuk, and John McNeill in 2025. The type specimen was collected on the 7 September 2008 by L. Meierott in the Kalbenstein nature reserve, Grainberg, Bavaria, Germany, at an elevation of 260 m.

=== Etymology ===
The specific epithet latisedes is a latinised form of the working name "Breitgesäß" (broad-bottomed), which refers to the leaf shape.

== Distribution and habitat ==
It is endemic to Bavaria, Germany, where it occurs in forest edges, along pathways, open forest hilltops, and in sparse pine forests at elevations of 220–360 m above sea level.

== Conservation ==
Aria latisedes has a small population of only about 100 individuals. The largest population is found within the Kalbenstein nature reserve.
