= Aria dracofolia =

Conservation status
- Critically Endangered (IUCN 3.1)

Scientific classification
- Kingdom: Plantae
- Clade: Tracheophytes
- Clade: Angiosperms
- Clade: Eudicots
- Clade: Rosids
- Order: Rosales
- Family: Rosaceae
- Genus: Aria
- Species: A. dracofolia

Binomial name
- Aria dracofolia (C.Németh) Mosyakin, Fedor. & McNeill
- It is endemic to northwestern Hungary

Synonyms
- Karpatiosorbus dracofolia (C.Németh) Sennikov & Kurtto; Pyrus dracofolia (C.Németh) M.F.Fay & Christenh.; Sorbus dracofolia C.Németh

Species of tree in the family Rosaceae

Aria dracofolia is a species of tree in the family Rosaceae endemic to northwestern Hungary. It is critically endangered.

== Description ==
=== Vegetative characteristics ===
Aria dracofolia is an up to 8 m tall tree with smooth, grey bark. The simple, obovate-rhomboid, lobed, 70–100 mm long, and 50–70 mm wide leaves of the short, sterile twigs have a biserrate margin and 8–10 pairs of lateral veins. The base is cuneate. The greenish-grey abaxial leaf surface is tomentose. The relatively short leaf lobes are acute. The deltoid or deltoid-lanceolate, 90–100 mm long, and 65–70 mm wide leaves of the terminal, fertile branches have 9–10 pairs of lateral veins. The base is cuneate. The tomentose petioles are 12–17 mm long.

=== Generative characteristics ===
The many-flowered, corymbose inflorescence with tomentose branches bears 25–40 flowers. The triangular sepals are white-tomentose. The broadly ovate, white petals are densely woolly at the base of the adaxial surface. The slightly elongate, globose, 11–13 mm long, and 9–12 mm wide, brownish-red fruit with persistent, 4–5 mm wide sepals is sparsely lenticellate. The fruit apex is tomentose.

== Taxonomy ==
It was first described as Sorbus dracofolia C.Németh by Csaba Németh in 2009. It was moved to the genus Aria (Pers.) J.Jacq. ex Host as Aria dracofolia (C.Németh) Mosyakin, Fedor. & McNeill by Sergei Leonidovich Mosyakin, Mykola Mykhaylovych Fedoronchuk, and John McNeill in 2025. The type specimen was collected on the 25 May 2008 by C. Németh in the Vértes Mountains near Gánt, Hungary at an altitude of 330 m above sea level. It has been confused with Aria pseudovertesensis, Aria simonkaiana, and Aria vertesensis.

=== Etymology ===
The specific epithet dracofolia from draco meaning dragon, and folius meaning leaf references the distinctively deltoid leaves, which resemble a paper kite.

== Distribution and habitat ==
It is endemic to the Vértes Mountains near Gánt, northwestern Hungary, where it occurs in a single 4 km^{2} area growing in xerophilous oak forest at altitudes of 300–350 m above sea level. It grows alongside Aria simonkaiana.

== Conservation ==
It is a critically endangered species with a small population of 49 mature trees. In the Red List of hreatened tree and shrub species of Hungary, it is categorised as critically endangered (CR). The population has faced an alarming population decline. It is not cultivated in any ex situ conservation collections.
