= Aria ratisbonensis =

- Aria ratisbonensis branch

Conservation status
- Endangered (IUCN 3.1)

Scientific classification
- Kingdom: Plantae
- Clade: Tracheophytes
- Clade: Angiosperms
- Clade: Eudicots
- Clade: Rosids
- Order: Rosales
- Family: Rosaceae
- Genus: Aria
- Species: A. ratisbonensis

Binomial name
- Aria ratisbonensis (N.Mey.) Mosyakin, Fedor. & McNeill
- It is endemic Bavaria, Germany

Synonyms
- Karpatiosorbus ratisbonensis (N.Mey.) Sennikov & Kurtto; Pyrus ratisbonensis (N.Mey.) M.F.Fay & Christenh.; Sorbus ratisbonensis N.Mey.

Species of tree in the family Rosaceae

Aria ratisbonensis, the Regensburg whitebeam, is an apomictic species of tree in the family Rosaceae endemic to Bavaria, Germany. It is an extremely rare and endangered species.

== Description ==
Aria ratisbonensis foliage

=== Vegetative characteristics ===
Aria ratisbonensis is an up to 6–8 m tall, sometimes multi-trunked tree. The trunk is 20–30 cm wide (DBH). It produces root sprouts. The elliptical, slightly lobed 6.5–8.5 cm long, and 4.5–6.5 cm wide leaves of the short twigs have 8–9 pairs of lateral veins, which are set 7 mm apart. At the base, the leaf lobes are 12–19 mm long, and towards the apex, the lobes are 2–3 mm long. The leaf base is cuneate. The petiole is 9–20 mm long. The 10 cm long leaves of the fertile, long twigs have a rounded base. The abaxial leaf surface is tomentose.

=== Generative characteristics ===
The inflorescence is flat-topped. The sepals are triangular. The 2 styles are partially fused. The stamens have cream-coloured anthers with a pink suffusion. The infructescence bears numerous globose, 10–13 mm long, orange to orange-brown accessory fruits with numerous 0.2–0.4 mm big lenticels. The fruits show a low seed fertility.

=== Cytology ===
The chromosome count is 2n = 3x = 51. It is triploid.

== Taxonomy ==
It was first described as Sorbus ratisbonensis N.Mey. by Norbert Meyer in 2005. It was moved to the genus Aria (Pers.) J.Jacq. ex Host as Aria ratisbonensis (N.Mey.) Mosyakin, Fedor. & McNeill by Sergei Leonidovich Mosyakin, Mykola Mykhaylovych Fedoronchuk, and John McNeill in 2025. The type specimen was collected by N. Meyer and O. Angerer on a forest clearing in the western part of the Pfarrberg hill, north of the B 8 highway near Nittendorf, Bavaria, Germany on the 1 July 2001. It arose via hybridisation and the maternal parental species is Aria torminalis, but the paternal parental species is unknown.

=== Etymology ===
The specific epithet ratisbonensis means from Regensburg.

== Distribution and habitat ==
Aria ratisbonensis growing on a rocky slope

It is endemic to Bavaria, Germany, where it occurs in a small area of 51 km^{2} near Regensburg growing in open pine forest, on the edges of deciduous forest, and on rocks at elevations of 350–450 m above sea level.

== Conservation ==
Aria ratisbonensis is an endangered species with a small population of 100 mature trees and 100 saplings. In the German national Red Lists of animals, plants and fungi, it is categorised as rare (R). It isn't legally protected. Its natural regeneration is limited, due to the low seed fertility. Its habitat is actively being managed by cutting the trees free from the surrounding oak and beech trees. Aria ratisbonensis is cultivated in the ex situ conservation collection of the Botanical Garden Erlangen and of the Botanischer Garten der Universität Regensburg.

== Uses ==
It is used as firewood, but is otherwise either unknown to the land owners or is considered an inferior tree species in regards to forestry.
