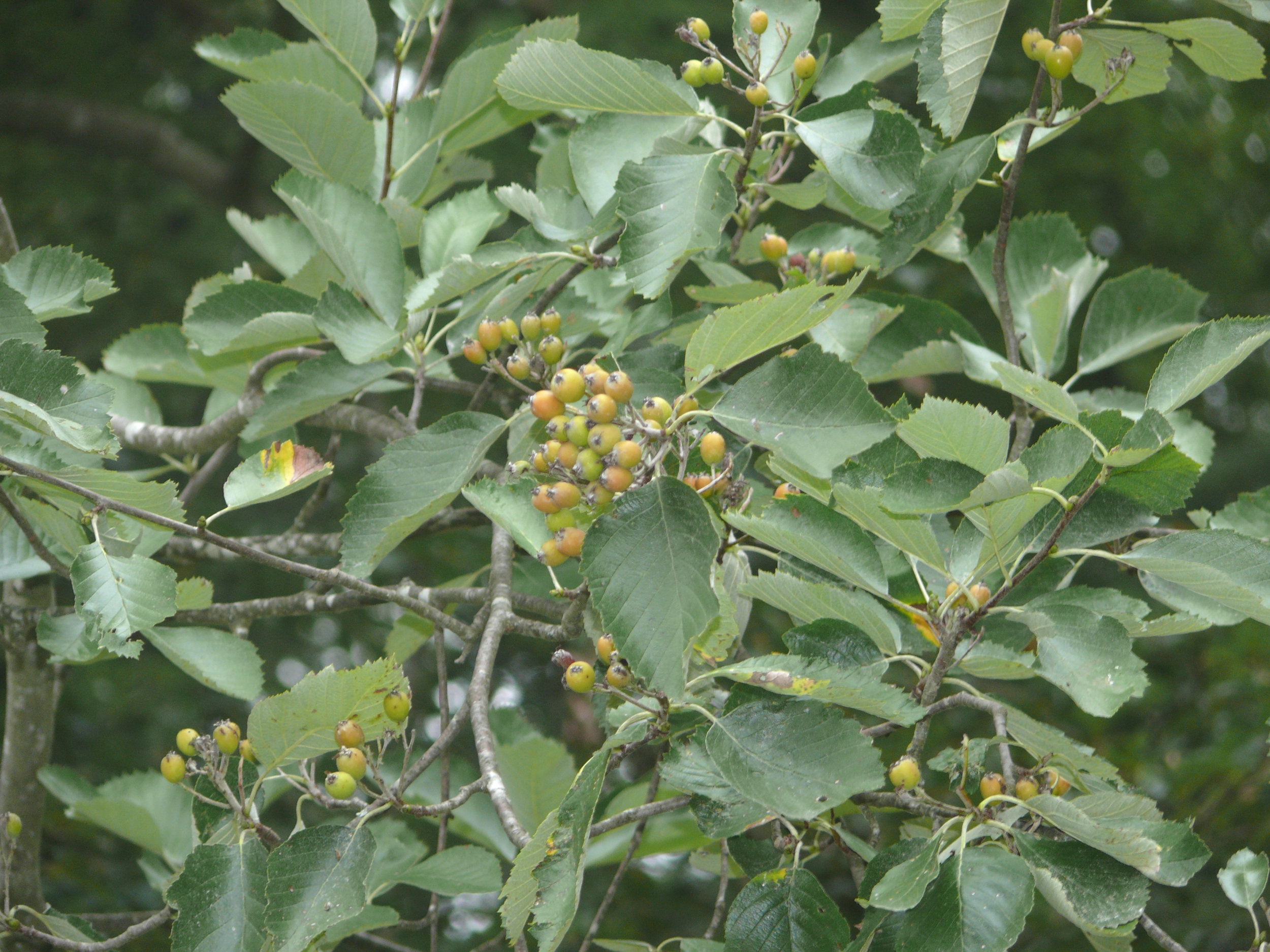
- Aria schuwerkiorum growing in the Altmühltal, Germany

Conservation status
- Critically Endangered (IUCN 3.1)

Scientific classification
- Kingdom: Plantae
- Clade: Embryophytes
- Clade: Tracheophytes
- Clade: Angiosperms
- Clade: Eudicots
- Clade: Rosids
- Order: Rosales
- Family: Rosaceae
- Genus: Aria
- Species: A. schuwerkiorum

Binomial name
- Aria schuwerkiorum (N.Mey.) Mosyakin, Fedor. & McNeill
- It is endemic to Bavaria, Germany

Synonyms
- Karpatiosorbus schuwerkiorum (N.Mey.) Sennikov & Kurtto; Pyrus schuwerkiorum (N.Mey.) M.F.Fay & Christenh.; Sorbus schuwerkiorum N.Mey.

= Aria schuwerkiorum =

Species of tree

Aria schuwerkiorum, or Schuwerk's whitebeam, is an apomictic species of tree in the family Rosaceae endemic to Bavaria, Germany. It is extremely rare and threatened with extinction.

== Description ==
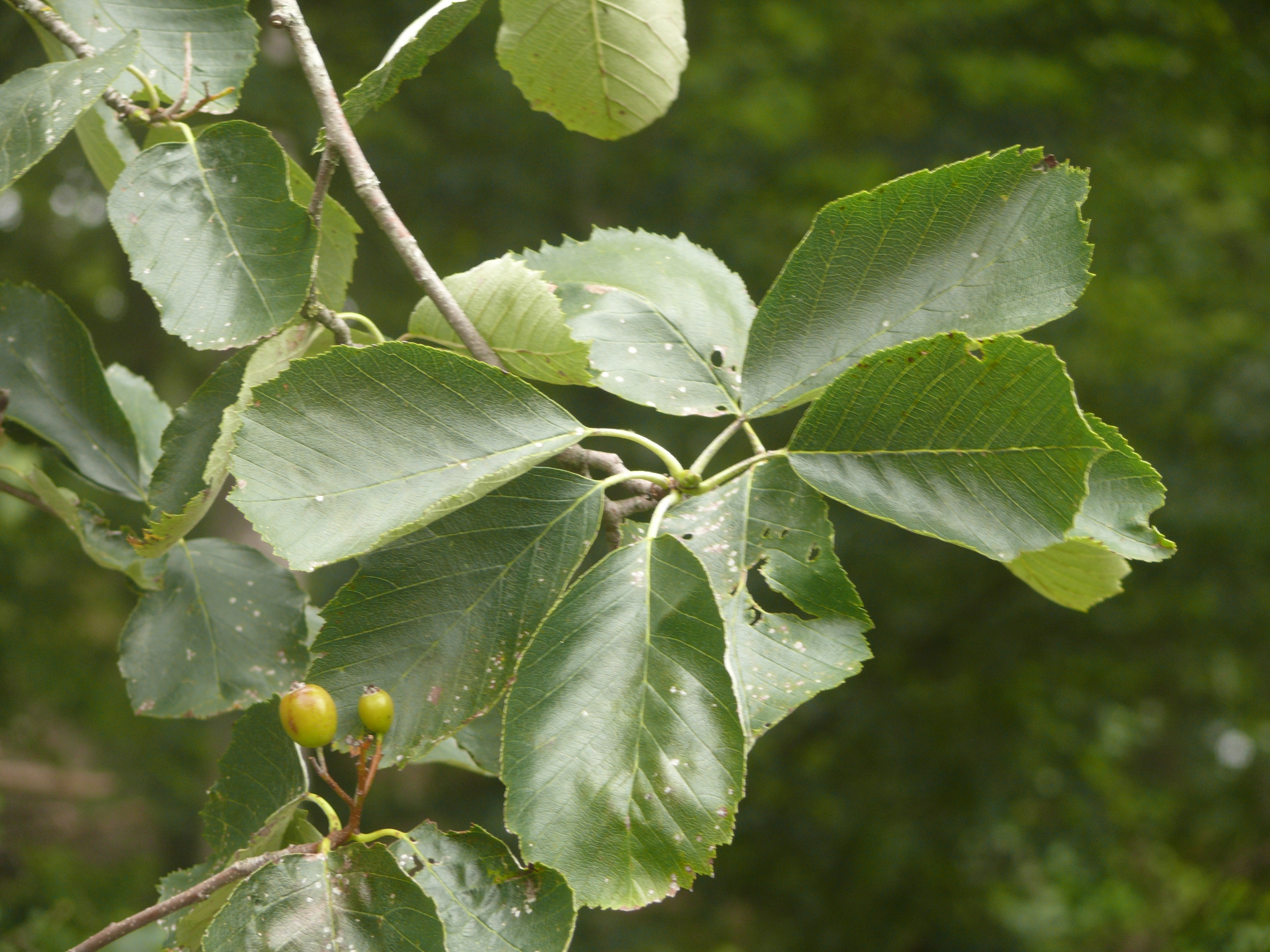
Aria schuwerkiorum foliage and fruit

=== Vegetative characteristics ===
Aria schuwerkiorum is an up to 10 m tall shrub or tree. The elliptic leaves have a serrate margin. The adaxial leaf surface is shiny and the abaxial leaf surface with 9–10 pairs of veins is pubescent with grey hairs.

=== Generative characteristics ===
The dome-shaped, 8–12 cm wide inflorescence bears white flowers. The white, basally pubescent petals are 3.5 mm long, and 7 mm wide. The relatively large, orange-red, oval fruit is 10 mm long, and 13 mm wide.

== Taxonomy ==
It was first described as Sorbus schuwerkiorum N.Mey. by Norbert Meyer in 2005. It was moved to the genus Aria (Pers.) J.Jacq. ex Host as Aria schuwerkiorum (N.Mey.) Mosyakin, Fedor. & McNeill by Sergei Leonidovich Mosyakin, Mykola Mykhaylovych Fedoronchuk, and John McNeill in 2025. It was first discovered by Ruth Schuwerk and und Herbert Schuwerk in 1985.

=== Etymology ===
The specific epithet schuwerkiorum honours Ruth Schuwerk and Herbert Schuwerk.

== Distribution and habitat ==
Aria schuwerkiorum is endemic to Bavaria, Germany, where it grows in two different locations in a small area of only 3 km^{2} on the edges of deciduous forest and on rocks on calcareous ground at elevations of 400–520 m above sea level.

== Conservation ==
It is a critically endangered species with a very restricted distribution and a small population of only 25 mature and 15 juvenile individuals. Landowners were informed of the occurrence of Aria schuwerkiorum on their property, and all individual trees were marked. The trees are being fenced off to protect them against grazing animals. State funding has been made available for the purpose of Aria schuwerkiorum conservation. It is cultivated in ex-situ conservation collections.
