= Aria rhombiformis =

Scientific classification
- Kingdom: Plantae
- Clade: Tracheophytes
- Clade: Angiosperms
- Clade: Eudicots
- Clade: Rosids
- Order: Rosales
- Family: Rosaceae
- Genus: Aria
- Species: A. rhombiformis

Binomial name
- Aria rhombiformis (C.Németh) Mosyakin, Fedor. & McNeill
- It is endemic to the Keszthely Mountains, Hungary

Synonyms
- Karpatiosorbus rhombiformis (C.Németh) Sennikov & Kurtto; Pyrus rhombiformis (C.Németh) M.F.Fay & Christenh.; Sorbus rhombiformis C.Németh

Species of tree in the family Rosaceae

Aria rhombiformis is an apomictic species of tree in the family Rosaceae endemic to the Keszthely Mountains, Hungary. It is threatened with extinction. Despite its rarity in the natural habitat, it is a widely cultivated ornamental tree planted in public places across Hungary.

== Description ==
=== Vegetative characteristics ===
Aria rhombiformis is an up to 5–6 m tall tree with grey bark. The ovoid, acute buds have green bud scales with brownish, pilose margins. The simple, petiolate, coriaceous, broadly rhombic or ovate-rhombic leaves with an unevenly biserrate margin are 7–10 cm long, and 7–10 cm wide. The leaf base is broadly cuneate or rarely broadly rounded. The apex of the lamina and the lateral lobes is finely acuminate. The leaf has 8–9 lateral veins. The petiole is 2–3.5(–4) cm long. The dull to glossy adaxial leaf surface is green. The greenish to greenish-grey abaxial leaf surface is sparsely pubescent, and becomes glabrescent in autumn.

=== Generative characteristics ===
The triangular sepals are densely tomentose. The petals are white. The 20 stamens have cream-coloured anthers. The 2 styles are free. The ovoid, brown, 18–20 mm long, and 14–16 mm wide fruit is densely spotted with lenticels. Flowering occurs in May, and the fruits mature in September.

=== Cytology ===
A. rhombiformis is triploid.

== Taxonomy ==
It was first described as Sorbus rhombiformis C.Németh by Csaba Németh in 2016. It was moved to the genus Aria (Pers.) J.Jacq. ex Host as Aria acutiserrata (C.Németh) Mosyakin, Fedor. & McNeill by Sergei Leonidovich Mosyakin, Mykola Mykhaylovych Fedoronchuk, and John McNeill in 2025. The type specimen was collected on the 17 July 2010 by C. Németh above the Vadlány-lik cave, Láz Hill, Vállus, Zala County Keszthely Mountains, Hungary at an altitude of 268 m above sea level.

=== Etymology ===
The epithet rhombiformis refers to the characteristic rhombic leaves.

== Distribution and habitat ==
It is endemic to the Keszthely Mountains, Hungary, where it occurs in a small area of 8 km^{2} on northern slopes of Láz Hill growing in xerophilous mountain forests, in closed, thermophilous, oak woodlands, in mixed karstic forests, and in mixed forests of rocky slopes on triassic dolomite bedrock. It grows alongside Aria bakonyensis, Aria balatonica, Aria concavifolia, Aria danubialis, Aria gayeriana, Aria subdanubialis agg., and Aria vallusensis.

== Conservation ==
In the Red List of threatened tree and shrub species of Hungary, it is categorised as critically endangered. It has a small population of 40 trees. There are far more cultivated trees than wild individuals of Aria rhombiformis.

== Uses ==
It is planted as a street tree, due to its favourable horticultural features. In horticulture, this species is often sold as "Sorbus decipientiformis 'Vállus'".
