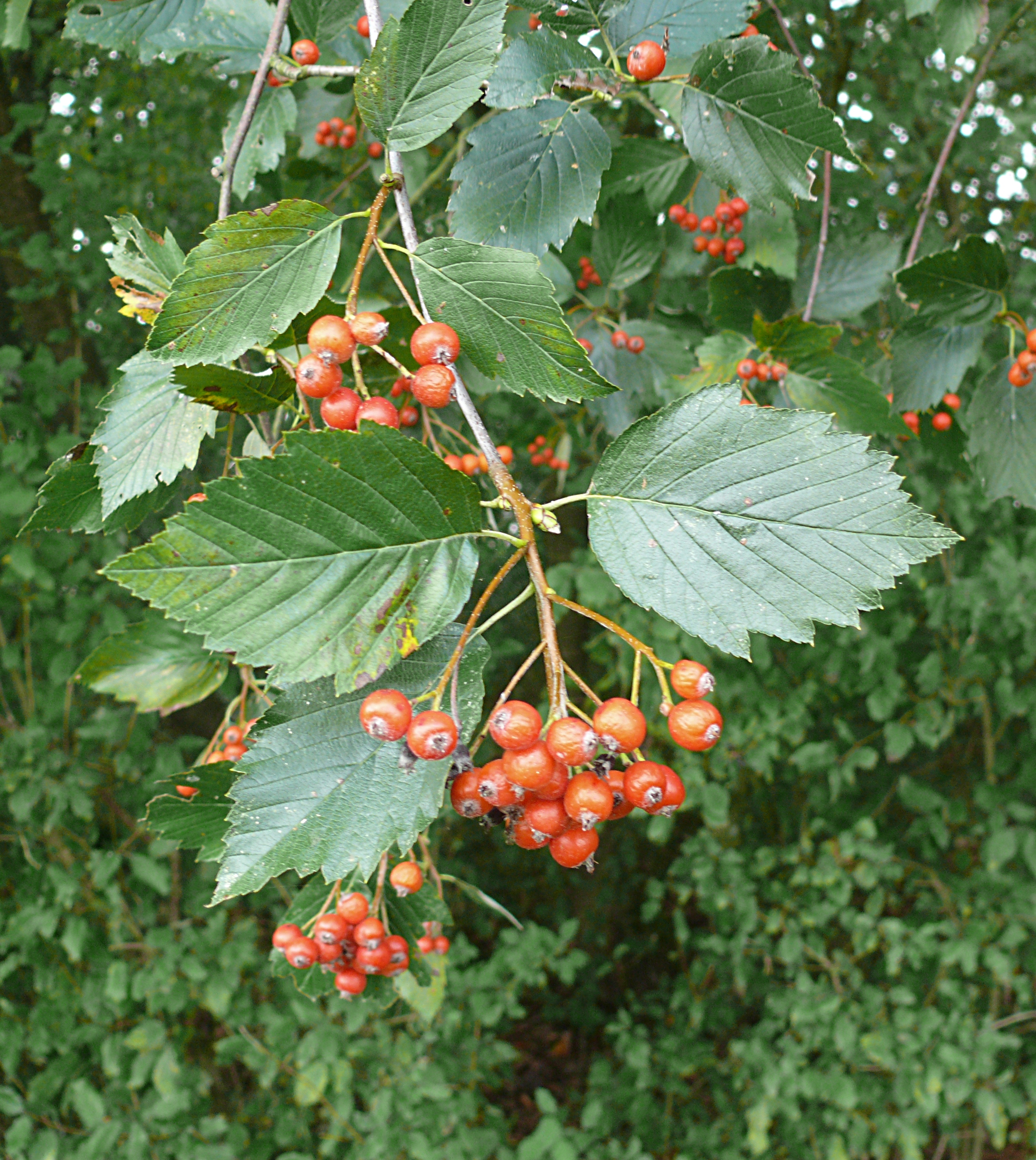

Conservation status
- Vulnerable (IUCN 3.1)

Scientific classification
- Kingdom: Plantae
- Clade: Tracheophytes
- Clade: Angiosperms
- Clade: Eudicots
- Clade: Rosids
- Order: Rosales
- Family: Rosaceae
- Genus: Aria
- Species: A. badensis

Binomial name
- Aria badensis (Düll) Mosyakin, Fedor. & McNeill

Synonyms
- Karpatiosorbus badensis (Düll) Sennikov & Kurtto; Pyrus aurelia-aquensis M.F.Fay & Christenh.; Sorbus badensis Düll

= Aria badensis =

Species of plant

Aria badensis is a species of flowering plant in the family Rosaceae. It is a tree endemic to Baden-Württemberg and Bavaria in southern Germany.
