= Aria pontis-satanae =

Conservation status
- Critically Endangered (IUCN 3.1)

Scientific classification
- Kingdom: Plantae
- Clade: Tracheophytes
- Clade: Angiosperms
- Clade: Eudicots
- Clade: Rosids
- Order: Rosales
- Family: Rosaceae
- Genus: Aria
- Species: A. pontis-satanae

Binomial name
- Aria pontis-satanae (M.Lepší & P.Lepší) Sennikov & Kurtto
- It is endemic to the South Moravian Region, Czech Republic

Synonyms
- Pyrus pontis-satanae (M.Lepší & P.Lepší) M.F.Fay & Christenh.; Sorbus pontis-satanae M.Lepší & P.Lepší

Species of tree in the family Rosaceae

Aria pontis-satanae is an apomictic species of tree in the family Rosaceae endemic to the Czech Republic. It is threatened with extinction.

== Description ==
=== Vegetative characteristics ===
Aria pontis-satanae is an up to 12 m tall shrub or tree with grey, initially smooth and later fissured bark. The fissures are found especially towards the base of the trunk. The thick twigs are brownish-grey and the new growth is initially tomentose, but later becomes glabrescent. The simple, broadly elliptical, 6.5–7.8 cm long, and 4.4–5.1 cm wide leaves of the short twigs with an acute to acuminate apex have an undulate to crispate margin. The cuneate leaf base is partially serrate. The buds are ovoid and pointed.

=== Generative characteristics ===
The compact, convex inflorescence with tomentose branchlets bears white, actinomorphic flowers. The triangular, acuminate, tomentose, sepals are persistent. The white, concave, broadly elliptical, 7.0–8.2 mm long, and 5.5–6.0 mm wide petals are tomentose at the base of the adaxial surface, but glabrous on the abaxial surface. The flower has 20 stamens with pale yellow anthers. The ovary is semi-inferior and the two free styles are basally tomentose. The red, lenticellate, subglobose, 11.0–12.5 mm long, and 10.5–12.0 mm wide fruit is tomentose towards the base and the apex, but is glabrescent in the middle. The seeds are brownish-grey.

=== Cytology ===
It is triploid.

== Taxonomy ==
It was first described as Sorbus pontis-satanae M.Lepší & P.Lepší by Martin Lepší and Petr Lepší in 2015. It was moved to the genus Aria (Pers.) J.Jacq. ex Host as Aria pontis-satanae (M.Lepší & P.Lepší) Sennikov & Kurtto by Alexander Nikolaevitsch Sennikov and Arto Kurtto in 2017. The type specimen was collected on the 16 August 2013 by M. Lepší on the southern slope of the Suchý žleb gorge, above the entrance of the Kateřinská jeskyně cave in southern Moravia, Lažánky (distr. Blansko), Czech Republic, at an elevation of 390 m above sea level.

=== Etymology ===
The specific epithet pontis-satanae refers to the Čertův most (Devil's bridge), which is close to where Aria pontis-satanae grows.

== Distribution and habitat ==
It is endemic to a very small area of only 0.2 km^{2} in the Suchý žleb gorge, Moravian Karst region, Czech Republic, where it occurs in open habitats of semi-natural and relict vegetation on cliffs, in pine plantations, man-made clearings, and on the edges and in gaps within forest and shrubby vegetation at altitudes of 380–450 m above sea level. Most individuals are found on west-facing and south-facing slopes opposite the Čertův most natural bridge, and it was only very rarely seen growing on north-facing slopes. It is light-demanding and found on calcareous soils.

== Conservation ==
It is a critically endangered species with a small population of only 10 saplings and 20 mature trees restricted to a small area. It is not held in any ex situ conservation collections. and is not protected by law.
