= Aria parviloba =

- The type tree of Aria parviloba

Conservation status
- Critically Endangered (IUCN 3.1)

Scientific classification
- Kingdom: Plantae
- Clade: Tracheophytes
- Clade: Angiosperms
- Clade: Eudicots
- Clade: Rosids
- Order: Rosales
- Family: Rosaceae
- Genus: Aria
- Species: A. parviloba

Binomial name
- Aria parviloba (T.C.G.Rich) Sennikov & Kurtto
- It is endemic to Gloucestershire, United Kingdom

Synonyms
- Karpatiosorbus parviloba (T.C.G.Rich) Sennikov & Kurtto; Pyrus parviloba (T.C.G.Rich) M.F.Fay & Christenh.; Sorbus parviloba T.C.G.Rich

Species of tree in the family Rosaceae

Aria parviloba is an apomictic species of tree in the family Rosaceae endemic to the Coldwell Rocks, Gloucestershire, United Kingdom. It is a critically endangered species with only one individual.

== Description ==
Underside of Aria parviloba leaves

=== Vegetative characteristics ===
Aria parviloba is an 8 m tall tree with greyish-brown bark. The ovoid buds are acute. The elliptic, slightly lobed, 7.0–12.0 cm long, and 5.5–10.0 cm wide leaves with a biserrate margin have an obtuse or acuminate apex and a cuneate base. The leaf margin is almost entire at the base, but biserrate and shallowly lobed towards the apex. The glabrous adaxial leaf surface is dark green and the tomentose abaxial leaf surface is greyish-green. The leaves have 17–23 lateral veins. The petiole is 10–18 mm long.

=== Generative characteristics ===
The up to 10 cm wide, many-flowered, convex inflorescence has greenish-white tomentose branchlets. The narrowly triangular, greenish sepals are basally tomentose. The elliptic, white petals are 9–11.5 mm long, and 5–7 mm wide. The stamens have cream-coloured andthers with a pink suffusion. The 2(–3) free or partially fused styles are basally pilose. The subglobose, red, 9–13 mm long, and 11–14 mm wide fruit bears few lenticels.

=== Cytology ===
The chromosome count is 2n = 4x = 68. It is tetraploid.

== Taxonomy ==
It was first described as Sorbus parviloba T.C.G.Rich by Timothy Charles Guy Rich in 2009. It was moved to the genus Aria (Pers.) J.Jacq. ex Host as Aria pannonica (Kárpáti) Sennikov & Kurtto by Alexander Nikolaevitsch Sennikov and Arto Kurtto in 2018. The type specimen was collected by T. Rich and L. Houston in Ship Rock, Coldwell Rocks, Symonds Yat, West Gloucestershire, United Kingdom on the 4 October 1999.

=== Etymology ===
The specific epithet parviloba is derived from parvi meaning short, and lobum meaning lobes. The leaves of Aria parviloba are shallowly lobed.

== Distribution and habitat ==
Aria parviloba in its natural habitat

It is endemic to the Coldwell Rocks, lower Wye River Valley, Gloucestershire, United Kingdom, where it grows on carboniferous limestone cliffs in open deciduous woodland growing alongside Fraxinus excelsior, Fagus sylvatica, and several other whitebeam species.

== Conservation ==
Aria parviloba is a critically endangered species with only one individual. The other individuals originally included in Aria parviloba belong to a different species. In the Vascular Plant Red List for England, it is categorised as critically endangered (CR). It is cultivated in several ex situ conservation collections in botanic gardens, such as in the Chester Zoo, and in the Arboretum and Botanical Garden, University of Bergen. Aria parviloba seeds are also stored in seedbanks.
