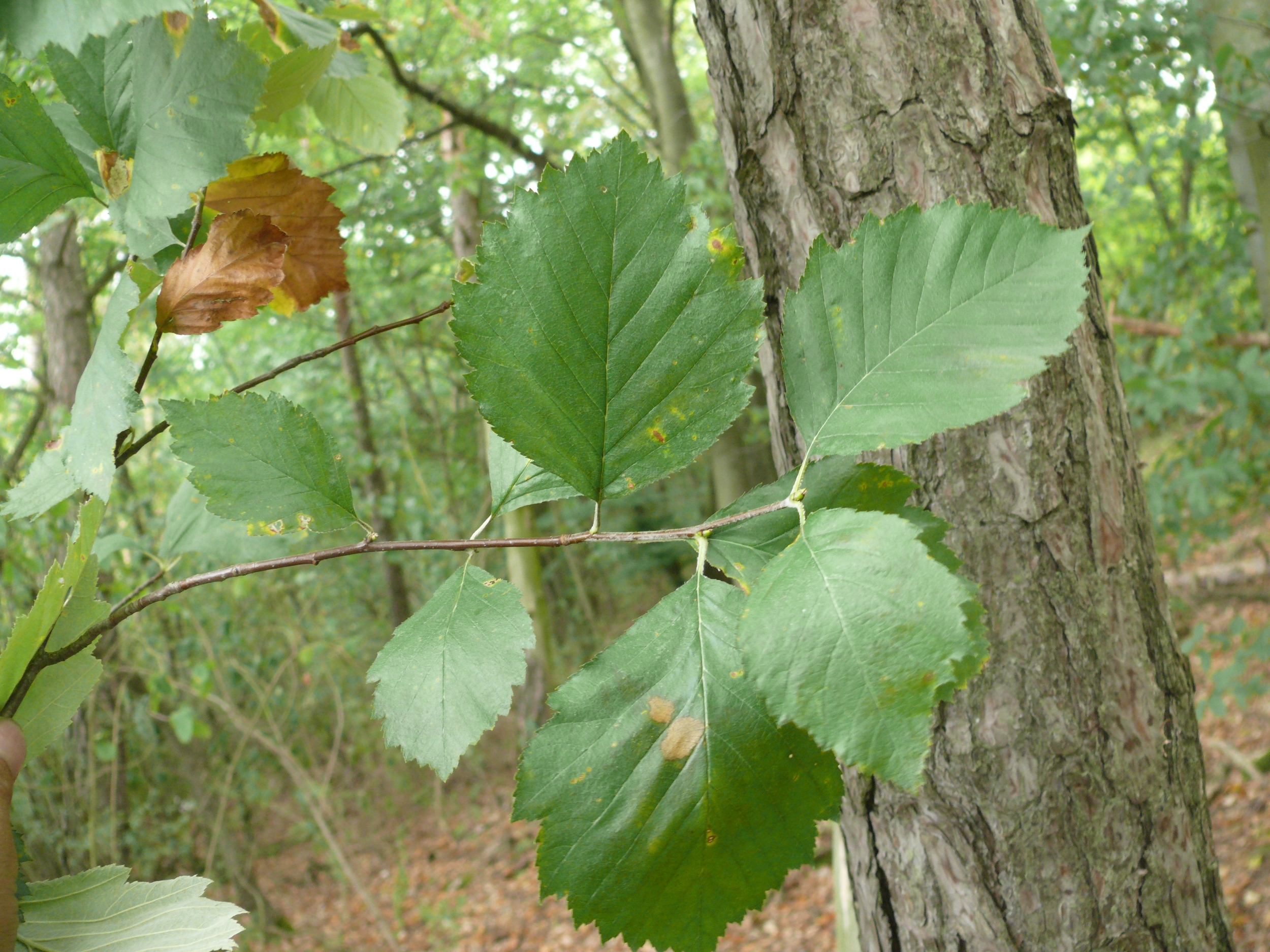
- Aria herbipolitana foliage

Conservation status
- Critically Endangered (IUCN 3.1)

Scientific classification
- Kingdom: Plantae
- Clade: Tracheophytes
- Clade: Angiosperms
- Clade: Eudicots
- Clade: Rosids
- Order: Rosales
- Family: Rosaceae
- Genus: Aria
- Species: A. herbipolitana

Binomial name
- Aria herbipolitana (Meierott) Mosyakin, Fedor. & McNeill
- It is endemic to Bavaria, Germany

Synonyms
- Karpatiosorbus herbipolitana (Meierott) Sennikov & Kurtto; Pyrus herbipolitana (Meierott) M.F.Fay & Christenh.; Sorbus herbipolitana Meierott

= Aria herbipolitana =

Species of tree

Aria herbipolitana, the Wuerzburg whitebeam, is an apomictic species of tree in the family Rosaceae endemic to Bavaria, Germany. It is extremely rare and threatened with extinction.

== Description ==
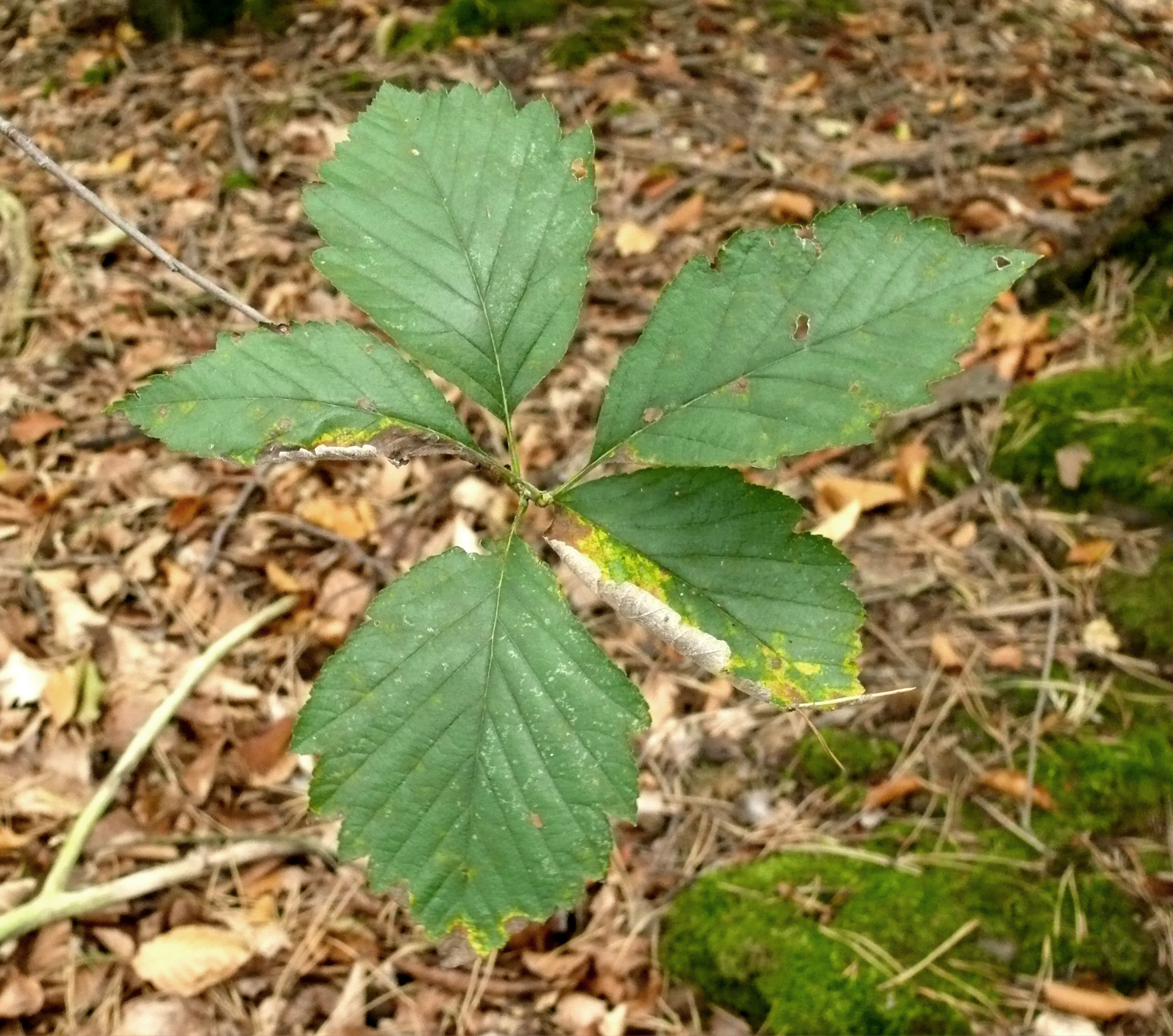
Aria herbipolitana foliage

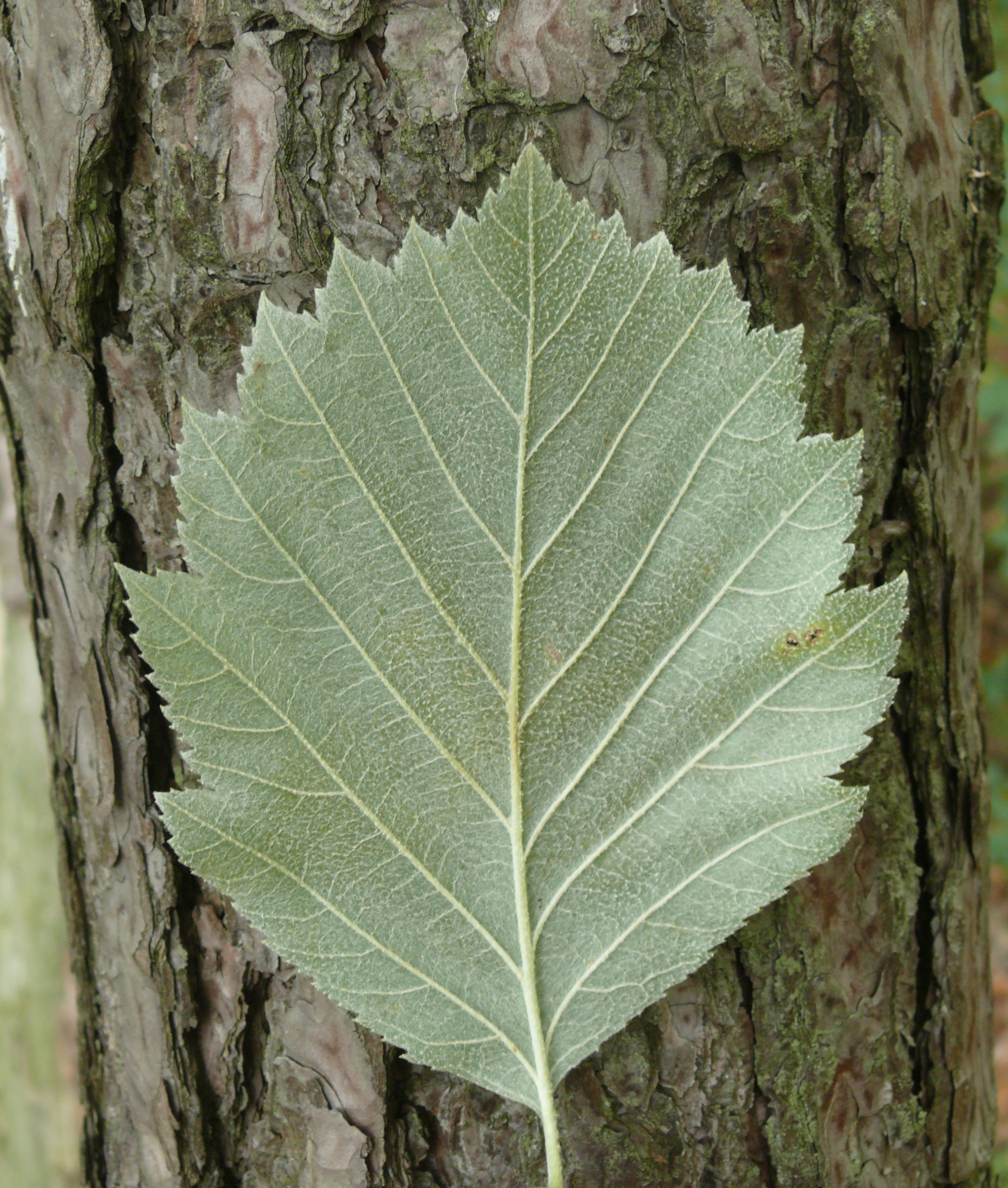
Underside of Aria herbipolitana leaf

=== Vegetative characteristics ===
Aria herbipolitana is a 5–6 m tall shrub or tree. The elliptic leaves of the short twigs with a serrate margin are 8–9 cm long and have 11–12 pairs of lateral veins. The leaves of the long twigs are rounded to ovate. The abaxial leaf surface is pubescent with grey hairs. In autumn, the foliage turns greenish to yellow.

=== Generative characteristics ===
The petals are white. The styles are basally fused. The globose accessory fruit is reddish orange.

=== Cytology ===
The chromosome count is 2n = 3x = 51.

== Taxonomy ==
It was first described as Sorbus herbipolitana Meierott by Lenz Meierott in 2005. It was moved to the genus Aria (Pers.) J.Jacq. ex Host as Aria herbipolitana (Meierott) Mosyakin, Fedor. & McNeill by Sergei Leonidovich Mosyakin, Mykola Mykhaylovych Fedoronchuk, and John McNeill in 2025. The type specimen was collected on the 8th of May 2003 by N. Meyer, L. Meierott, and O. Angerer near Greußenheim, Bavaria, Germany.

=== Etymology ===
The specific epithet herbipolitana means "from Würzburg".

== Distribution and habitat ==
It is endemic to Bavaria, Germany, where it occurs in open pine forest and on the edges of deciduous forest at elevations of 250–320 m above sea level.

== Conservation ==
It is a critically endangered species with a small population of only 35 saplings and 40 mature trees. It has a scattered distribution spanning an area of 240 km^{2}. The area of occupancy is only 76 km^{2}. It doesn't have special legal protections. It is cultivated in one ex situ conservation collection.
