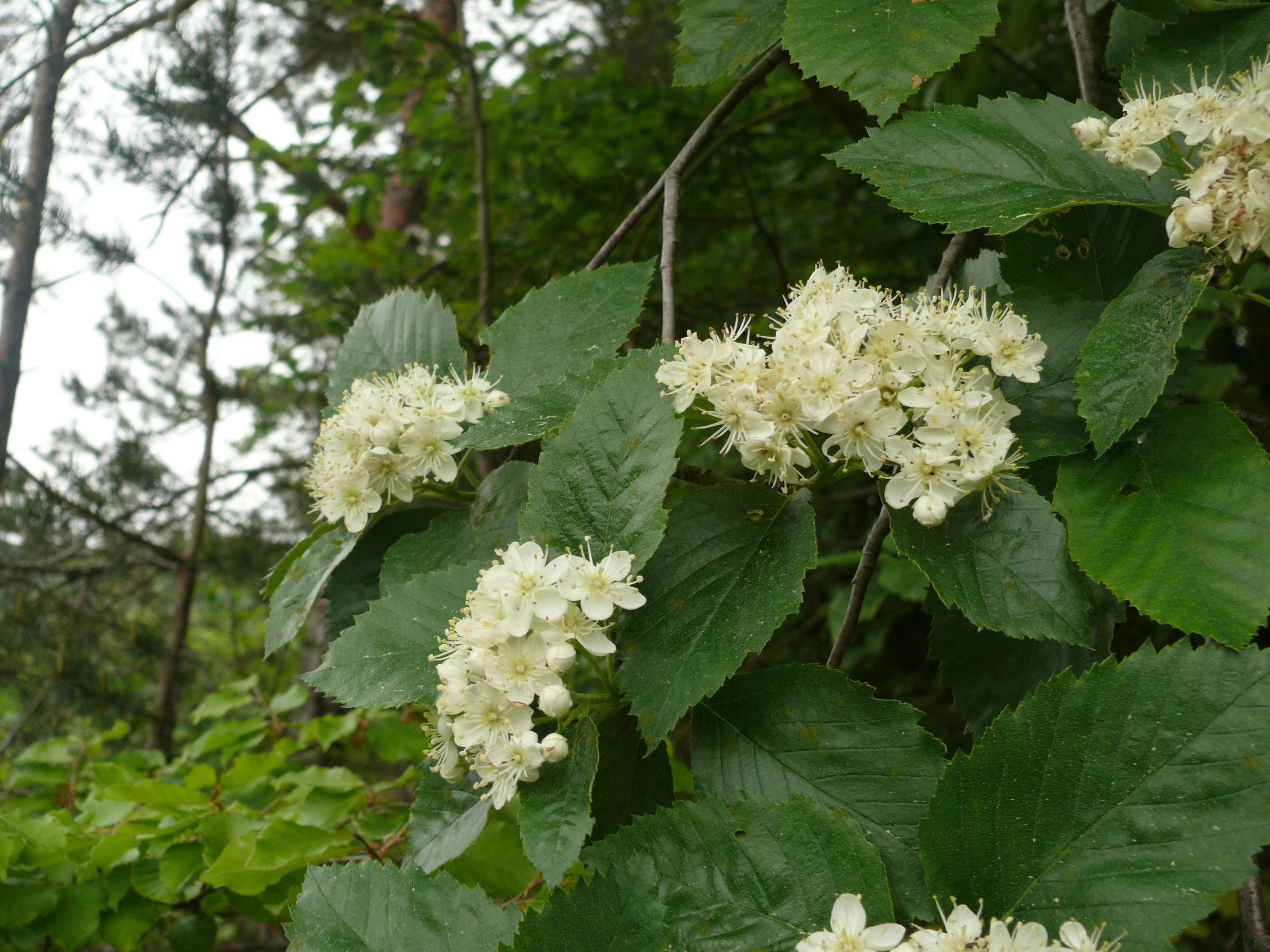
- Flowering branches of Aria haesitans

Conservation status
- Endangered (IUCN 3.1)

Scientific classification
- Kingdom: Plantae
- Clade: Tracheophytes
- Clade: Angiosperms
- Clade: Eudicots
- Clade: Rosids
- Order: Rosales
- Family: Rosaceae
- Genus: Aria
- Species: A. haesitans

Binomial name
- Aria haesitans (Meierott) Mosyakin, Fedor. & McNeill
- It is endemic to Bavaria, Germany

Synonyms
- Karpatiosorbus haesitans (Meierott) Sennikov & Kurtto; Pyrus haesitans (Meierott) M.F.Fay & Christenh.; Sorbus haesitans Meierott

= Aria haesitans =

Species of tree in the family Rosaceae

Aria haesitans is an apomictic species of tree in the family Rosaceae endemic to Bavaria, Germany. It is an extremely rare and endangered species.

== Description ==
Flowering Aria haesitans in its natural habitat in Mainfranken, Germany

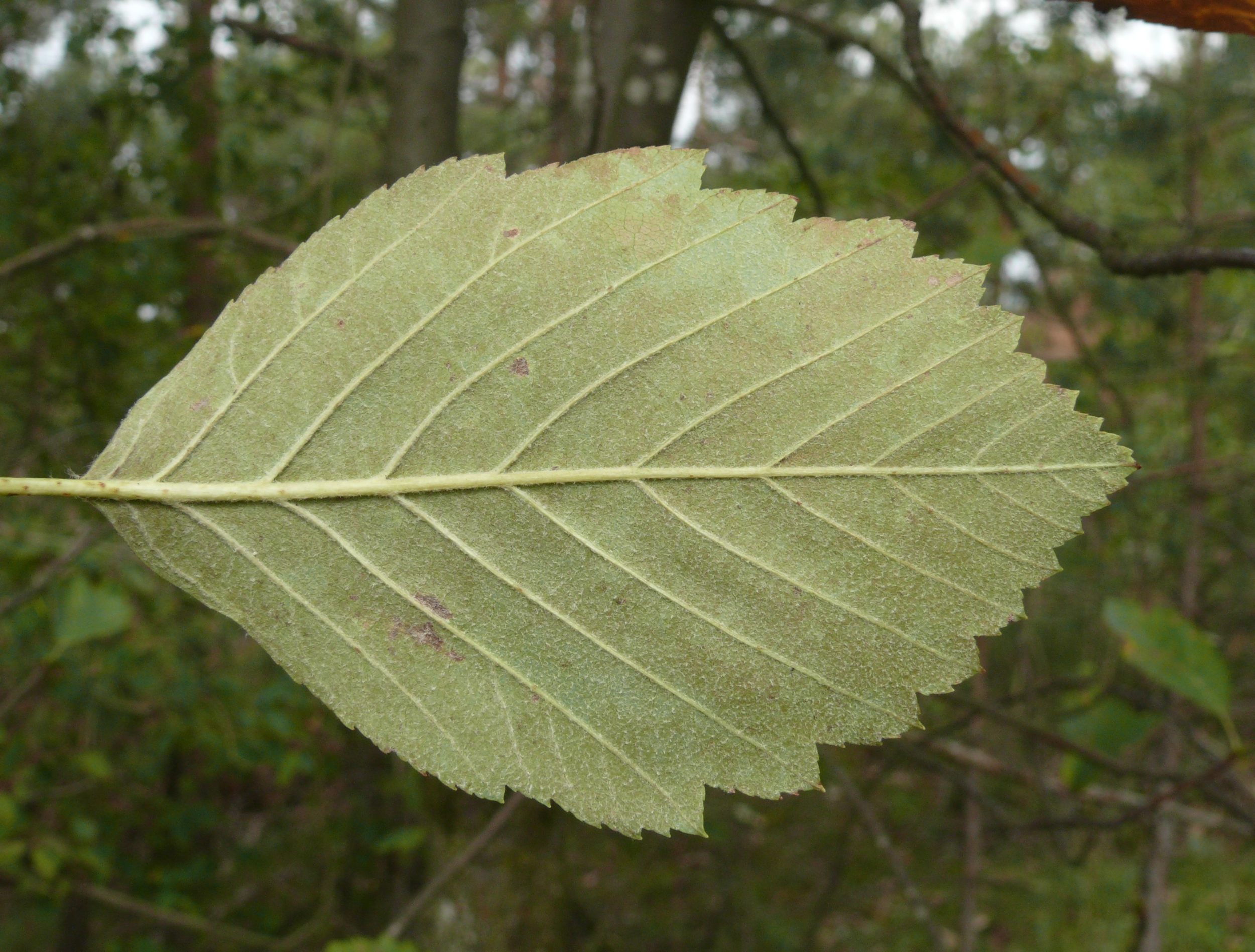
Lower leaf surface of Aria haesitans leaf

=== Vegetative characteristics ===
Aria haesitans is a 4–6 m tall shrub or tree. The 7–8 cm long, and 6 cm wide, shallowly lobed leaves of the short twigs have a serrate margin with less than 5 mm long teeth. The larger leaves of the long twigs are 9–12 cm long, and 7–9 cm wide. The grey abaxial leaf surface is densely tomentose.

=== Generative characteristics ===
The flowers have 2 partially fused styles. The globose, orange-red accessory fruit bears few large lenticels.

=== Cytology ===
The chromosome count is 2n = 4x = 68. It is tetraploid.

== Taxonomy ==
It was first described as Sorbus haesitans Meierott by Lenz Meierott in 2005. It was moved to the genus Aria (Pers.) J.Jacq. ex Host as Aria haesitans (Meierott) Mosyakin, Fedor. & McNeill by Sergei Leonidovich Mosyakin, Mykola Mykhaylovych Fedoronchuk, and John McNeill in 2025. The type specimen was collected by N. Meyer, L. Meierott, and O. Angerer in Fischersberg, Thüngersheim, Germany on the 4 September 2003.

=== Etymology ===
The specific epithet haesitans means undecided or stuck.

== Distribution and habitat ==
It is endemic to the Main river valley of Thüngersheim, Bavaria, Germany, where it occurs in a small area of 12 km^{2} growing in open pine forest and on forest edges on dry north-facing slopes above the vineyards at altitudes of 260–320 m above sea level.

== Conservation ==
It is an endangered species with a small population of 70 mature trees. In the German Red List, it is categorised as Endangered (2). In the Bavarian Red List, it is categorised as extremely rare (R). It is not legally protected. It is cultivated in the ex situ conservation collection of the Botanischer Garten der Universität Regensburg.
