= Aria vallusensis =

Scientific classification
- Kingdom: Plantae
- Clade: Tracheophytes
- Clade: Angiosperms
- Clade: Eudicots
- Clade: Rosids
- Order: Rosales
- Family: Rosaceae
- Genus: Aria
- Species: A. vallusensis

Binomial name
- Aria vallusensis (C.Németh) Mosyakin, Fedor. & McNeill
- It is endemic to the Keszthely mountains, Hungary

Synonyms
- Karpatiosorbus vallusensis (C.Németh) Sennikov & Kurtto; Pyrus vallusensis (C.Németh) M.F.Fay & Christenh.; Sorbus vallusensis C.Németh

Species of tree in the family Rosaceae

Aria vallusensis is a species of tree in the family Rosaceae endemic to the Keszthely mountains, Hungary. It is an endangered species.

== Description ==
=== Vegetative characteristics ===
Aria vallusensis is an up to 7–8 m tall tree with grey bark. The ovoid, acute buds have green bud scales with brownish, sparsely tomentose margins. The simple, broadly ovate leaves with biserrate margins are 9–12.5 cm long, and 7–11 cm wide. The leaf base is rounded to cuneate. The adaxial leaf surface is green and glossy. The greenish-grey abaxial leaf surface is tomentose. The leaves have 11–12 lateral veins. The petiole is 2.0–2.5 cm long.

=== Generative characteristics ===
The triangular sepals are densely tomentose. The petals are white. The flower has 20 stamens with cream-coloured anthers. The 2 styles are free. The brown, ovate, 15–17 mm long, and 12–14 mm wide fruit is bears numerous small and a few large, whitish lenticels.

=== Cytology ===
It is triploid.

== Taxonomy ==
It was first described as Sorbus vallusensis C.Németh by Csaba Németh in 2016. It was moved to the genus Aria (Pers.) J.Jacq. ex Host as Aria vallusensis (C.Németh) Mosyakin, Fedor. & McNeill by Sergei Leonidovich Mosyakin, Mykola Mykhaylovych Fedoronchuk, and John McNeill in 2025. The type specimen was collected on the 16 July 2011 by C. Németh in Zala County, Keszthely Mts, Vállus, Láz-tető, Hungary, at an altitude of 379 m above sea level.

=== Etymology ===
The specific epithet vallusensis refers to the small village Vállus, which is close to the habitat of Aria vallusensis.

== Distribution and habitat ==
It is endemic to the Keszthely mountains, Hungary, where it occurs in an area of 25 km^{2} in thermophilous oak woodlands, mixed forests on rocky slopes, or in pine plantations.

== Conservation ==
It has a small population of at least 150 trees. In the Red List of threatened tree and shrub species of Hungary, it is categorised as an endangered species.
