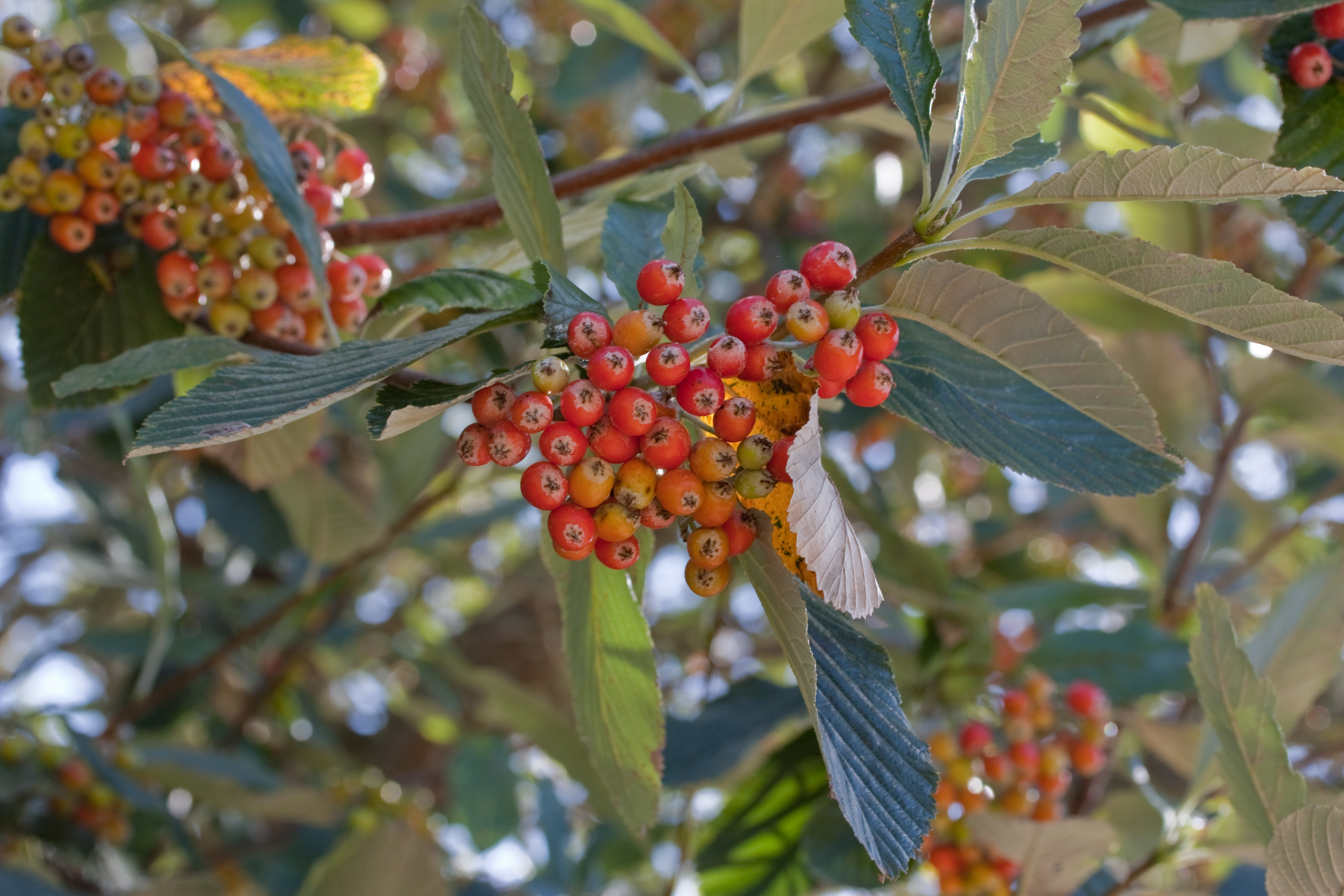
- Common whitebeam fruit

Scientific classification
- Kingdom: Plantae
- Clade: Tracheophytes
- Clade: Angiosperms
- Clade: Eudicots
- Clade: Rosids
- Order: Rosales
- Family: Rosaceae
- Subfamily: Amygdaloideae
- Tribe: Maleae
- Subtribe: Malinae
- Genus: Aria (Pers.) J.Jacq. ex Host

Synonyms
- × Chamaearia Mezhenskyj; Chamaemespilus Medik.; Hahnia Medik.; Karpatiosorbus Sennikov & Kurtto; Majovskya Sennikov & Kurtto; × Tormaria Mezhenskyj; Torminalis Medik.; Torminaria Opiz; Torminaria (DC.) M.Roem.

= Aria (plant) =

Genus of plants

Aria is a genus of plant in the rose family Rosaceae. It includes some of the deciduous species commonly known as whitebeams, and is native to Europe, the north African mountains and western Asia. Via hybridisation with related genera, it is a main contributor to the genesis of a complex of apomicts of intergeneric hybrid origin, which are also commonly referred to as whitebeams.

== Description ==
Aria collina in the Franconian Jura

Most species in the genus Aria are small to medium-sized bushes or trees while the largest, the wild service tree (Aria torminalis), may grow to about 30 metres (98 ft) tall. The leaves are simple or lobed, and often almost white on the underside. The leaf margins are often serrated. They bear corymbs of creamy white (pink in Aria chamaemespilus) flowers in spring, and the small, often colourful orange-red to bright red (brown and lightly spotted in Aria torminalis) pome fruit ripen in late summer or autumn.

== Whitebeam apomicts ==
Hybridisation events between at least one member of genus Aria and at least one member of at least one different genus in the subtribe Malinae have led to a complex of apomictic microspecies in Europe and western Asia, whose classification has been unclear for decades. Traditionally, they and their parent genera were commonly treated as subgenera of a large genus Sorbus s.l.; however, this system was found to be polyphyletic. In 2017, a system was proposed and then widely adopted that classifies these microspecies into separate genera according to their parentage, and elevates all former subgenera of Sorbus s.l into genera.

- Hedlundia - Aria × Sorbus hybrids
- Karpatiosorbus - Aria × Torminalis hybrids
- Majovskya - Aria × Chamaemespilus hybrids
- Scandosorbus (syn. Borkhausenia) - Aria × Sorbus × Torminalis hybrids
- Normeyera - Aria × Chamaemespilus × Sorbus hybrids

In 2025, a new study published a simplified set of generic delimitations in tribe Maleae. Based on morphological and genetic analysis they consolidated the genera Chamaemespilus, Karpatiosorbus, Majovskya, and Torminalis into Aria, and the genera Normeyera and Scandosorbus into Hedlundia. This new classification is accepted by the Plants of the World Online database. Thus, the genus as currently defined is made up of the "typical" whitebeams (Aria s.str.), the false medlar (Aria chamaemespilus, formerly Sorbus chamaemespilus or Chamaemespilus alpina), the wild service tree (Aria torminalis, formerly Sorbus torminalis or Torminalis glaberrima), and their hybrids.

== Distribution and species ==
The genus Aria is distributed across much of Europe, western Asia and the Atlas Mountains in north Africa. Although the genus is relatively species-rich, only a few species are widely distributed, notably common whitebeam, wild service tree (Aria torminalis), Balkan whitebeam (A. graeca) and A. umbellata. In contrast, many species, particularly those that are apomictic, are endemic to only a particular region, or even to only one site. As of July 2026, Plants of the World Online recognises the following 152 species in the genus Aria:

- Aria acutiserrata (C.Németh) Mosyakin, Fedor. & McNeill
- Aria adamii (Kárpáti) Mosyakin, Fedor. & McNeill
- Aria adeana (N.Mey.) Mosyakin, Fedor. & McNeill
- Aria admonitor (M.Proctor) Mosyakin, Fedor. & McNeill
- Aria albensis (M.Lepší, Boublík, P.Lepší & Vít) Mosyakin, Fedor. & McNeill
- Aria alnifrons (Kovanda) Mosyakin, Fedor. & McNeill
- Aria × ambigua Michalet ex Decne.
- Aria amici-petri (Mikoláš) Mosyakin, Fedor. & McNeill
- Aria andreanszkyana (Kárpáti) Mosyakin, Fedor. & McNeill
- Aria arvonicola (P.D.Sell) Sennikov & Kurtto
- Aria avonensis (T.C.G.Rich) Sennikov & Kurtto
- Aria badensis (Düll) Mosyakin, Fedor. & McNeill
- Aria bakonyensis (Jáv.) Mosyakin, Fedor. & McNeill
- Aria balatonica (Kárpáti) Mosyakin, Fedor. & McNeill
- Aria baldaccii (C.K.Schneid.) Sennikov & Kurtto
- Aria barabitsii (C.Németh) Mosyakin, Fedor. & McNeill
- Aria barrandienica (Vít, M.Lepší & P.Lepší) Mosyakin, Fedor. & McNeill
- Aria barthae (Kárpáti) Mosyakin, Fedor. & McNeill
- Aria bodajkensis (Barabits) Mosyakin, Fedor. & McNeill
- Aria bohemica (Kovanda) Mosyakin, Fedor. & McNeill
- Aria borosiana (Kárpáti) Mosyakin, Fedor. & McNeill
- Aria bristoliensis (Wilmott) Mosyakin, Fedor. & McNeill
- Aria busambarensis (G.Castellano, P.Marino, Raimondo & Spadaro) Sennikov & Kurtto
- Aria cambrensis (M.Proctor) Sennikov & Kurtto - Welsh whitebeam
- Aria carolipolitana (N.Mey. & Meierott) Mosyakin, Fedor. & McNeill
- Aria chamaemespilus (L.) Host
- Aria cheddarensis (L.Houston & Ashley Robertson) Sennikov & Kurtto - Cheddar whitebeam
- Aria colchica (Zinserl.) Mezhenskyj
- Aria collina (M.Lepší, P.Lepší & N.Mey.) Sennikov & Kurtto
- Aria concavifolia (C.Németh) Mosyakin, Fedor. & McNeill
- Aria cordigastensis (N.Mey.) Mosyakin, Fedor. & McNeill
- Aria croceocarpa (P.D.Sell) Mosyakin, Fedor. & McNeill
- Aria cucullifera (M.Lepší & P.Lepší) Sennikov & Kurtto
- Aria danubialis (Jáv.) Sennikov & Kurtto
- Aria decipiens (Bechst.) M.Roem.
- Aria decipientiformis (Kárpáti) Mosyakin, Fedor. & McNeill
- Aria degenii (Jáv.) Mosyakin, Fedor. & McNeill
- Aria devoniensis (E.F.Warb.) Mosyakin, Fedor. & McNeill
- Aria dolomiticola (Mikoláš) Mosyakin, Fedor. & McNeill
- Aria dominii (Kárpáti) Mosyakin, Fedor. & McNeill
- Aria dracofolia (C.Németh) Mosyakin, Fedor. & McNeill
- Aria dubronensis (N.Mey., Feulner & T.C.G.Rich) Mosyakin, Fedor. & McNeill
- Aria edulis (Willd.) M.Roem.
- Aria eminens (E.F.Warb.) Sennikov & Kurtto - Round-leaved whitebeam
- Aria eminentiformis (T.C.G.Rich) Sennikov & Kurtto - Doward whitebeam
- Aria eminentoides (L.Houston) Sennikov & Kurtto - Twin Cliffs whitebeam
- Aria eugenii-kelleri (Kárpáti) Mosyakin, Fedor. & McNeill
- Aria evansii (T.C.G.Rich) Sennikov & Kurtto
- Aria eximia (Kovanda) Mosyakin, Fedor. & McNeill
- Aria eystettensis (N.Mey.) Mosyakin, Fedor. & McNeill
- Aria fischeri (N.Mey.) Mosyakin, Fedor. & McNeill
- Aria franconica (Bornm.) Mosyakin, Fedor. & McNeill
- Aria futakiana (Kárpáti) Mosyakin, Fedor. & McNeill
- Aria gayeriana (Kárpáti) Mosyakin, Fedor. & McNeill
- Aria gemella (Kovanda) Mosyakin, Fedor. & McNeill
- Aria gerecseensis (Boros & Kárpáti) Mosyakin, Fedor. & McNeill
- Aria graeca (Lodd. ex Spach) M.Roem. - Balkan whitebeam
- Aria greenii (T.C.G.Rich) Sennikov & Kurtto
- Aria griseotormaria (N.Mey. & Meierott) Mosyakin, Fedor. & McNeill
- Aria haesitans (Meierott) Mosyakin, Fedor. & McNeill
- Aria haljamovae (Bernátová & Májovský) Mosyakin, Fedor. & McNeill
- Aria herbipolitana (Meierott) Mosyakin, Fedor. & McNeill
- Aria herefordensis (D.Green) Sennikov & Kurtto
- Aria hibernica (E.F.Warb.) Sennikov & Kurtto - Irish whitebeam
- Aria holubyana (Kárpáti) Mosyakin, Fedor. & McNeill
- Aria hoppeana (N.Mey.) Mosyakin, Fedor. & McNeill
- Aria houstoniae (T.C.G.Rich) Mosyakin, Fedor. & McNeill
- Aria hungarica (Bornm.) Sennikov & Kurtto
- Aria javorkana (Somlyay, Sennikov & Vojtkó) Sennikov & Kurtto
- Aria joannis (Kárpáti) Mosyakin, Fedor. & McNeill
- Aria karpatii (Boros) Mosyakin, Fedor. & McNeill
- Aria keszthelyensis (Somlyay & Sennikov) Sennikov & Kurtto
- Aria klasterskyana (Kárpáti) Mosyakin, Fedor. & McNeill
- Aria kmetiana (Kárpáti) Mosyakin, Fedor. & McNeill
- Aria lancastriensis (E.F.Warb.) Sennikov & Kurtto- Lancastrian whitebeam
- Aria latifolia (Lam.) M.Roem.
- Aria latisedes (N.Mey. & Meierott) Mosyakin, Fedor. & McNeill
- Aria leighensis (T.C.G.Rich) Sennikov & Kurtto - Leigh Woods whitebeam
- Aria leptophylla (E.F.Warb.) Sennikov & Kurtto - Thin-leaved whitebeam
- Aria madoniensis (Raimondo, G.Castellano, Bazan & Schicchi) Sennikov & Kurtto
- Aria magocsyana (Kárpáti) Mosyakin, Fedor. & McNeill
- Aria margaretae (M.Proctor) Sennikov & Kurtto - Margaret's whitebeam
- Aria meierottii (N.Mey.) Mosyakin, Fedor. & McNeill
- Aria mergenthaleriana (N.Mey.) Mosyakin, Fedor. & McNeill
- Aria meridionalis (Guss. ex Tod.) Raimondo & Greuter
- Aria meyeri (S.Hammel & Haynold) Mosyakin, Fedor. & McNeill
- Aria milensis (M.Lepší, Boublík, P.Lepší & Vít) Mosyakin, Fedor. & McNeill
- Aria moenofranconica (N.Mey. & Meierott) Mosyakin, Fedor. & McNeill
- Aria moravica (M.Lepší & P.Lepší) Sennikov & Kurtto
- Aria obtusifolia (Ser.) Sennikov & Kurtto
- Aria omissa (Velebil) Mosyakin, Fedor. & McNeill
- Aria orbiculata (Gabrieljan) Gabrieljan
- Aria pannonica (Kárpáti) Sennikov & Kurtto
- Aria parviloba (T.C.G.Rich) Sennikov & Kurtto - Ship Rock whitebeam
- Aria pelsoensis (C.Németh) Mosyakin, Fedor. & McNeill
- Aria perlonga (Meierott) Mosyakin, Fedor. & McNeill
- Aria petraea (Velebil, M.Lepší & P.Lepší) Mosyakin, Fedor. & McNeill
- Aria phitosiana Raimondo & Greuter
- Aria polgariana (C.Németh) Mosyakin, Fedor. & McNeill
- Aria pontis-satanae (M.Lepší & P.Lepší) Sennikov & Kurtto
- Aria porrigentiformis (E.F.Warb.) Sennikov & Kurtto - Grey-leaved whitebeam
- Aria portae-bohemicae (M.Lepší, P.Lepší, Vít & Boublík) Mosyakin, Fedor. & McNeill
- Aria pseudobakonyensis (Kárpáti) Mosyakin, Fedor. & McNeill
- Aria pseudolatifolia (Boros) Mosyakin, Fedor. & McNeill
- Aria pseudosemi-incisa (Boros) Mosyakin, Fedor. & McNeill
- Aria pseudovertesensis (Boros) Mosyakin, Fedor. & McNeill
- Aria puellarum (Meierott) Mosyakin, Fedor. & McNeill
- Aria ratisbonensis (N.Mey.) Mosyakin, Fedor. & McNeill
- Aria redliana (Kárpáti) Mosyakin, Fedor. & McNeill
- Aria remensis (Cornier) Mosyakin, Fedor. & McNeill
- Aria rhodanthera (Kovanda) Mosyakin, Fedor. & McNeill
- Aria rhombiformis (C.Németh) Mosyakin, Fedor. & McNeill
- Aria richii (L.Houston) Sennikov & Kurtto
- Aria × robertsonii (T.C.G.Rich) Sennikov & Kurtto
- Aria rupicola (Syme) Mezhenskyj - Rock whitebeam
- Aria rupicoloides (L.Houston & T.G.C.Rich) Sennikov & Kurtto - Gough's Rock whitebeam
- Aria saxicola (T.C.G.Rich) Sennikov & Kurtto - Symonds Yat whitebeam
- Aria schnizleiniana (N.Mey.) Mosyakin, Fedor. & McNeill
- Aria schuwerkiorum (N.Mey.) Mosyakin, Fedor. & McNeill
- Aria sellii (T.C.G.Rich) Mosyakin, Fedor. & McNeill
- Aria semi-incisa (Borbás) Beck
- Aria seyboldiana (S.Hammel & Haynold) Mosyakin, Fedor. & McNeill
- Aria simonkaiana (Kárpáti) Mosyakin, Fedor. & McNeill
- Aria slovenica (Kovanda) Mosyakin, Fedor. & McNeill
- Aria spectans (L.Houston) Sennikov & Kurtto
- Aria stankovii (Juz.) Sennikov & Kurtto
- Aria stenophylla (M.Proctor) Sennikov & Kurtto - Llanthony whitebeam
- Aria stirtoniana (T.C.G.Rich) Sennikov & Kurtto - Stirton's whitebeam
- Aria subcuneata (Wilmott) Mosyakin, Fedor. & McNeill
- Aria subdanubialis (Soó) Sennikov & Kurtto
- Aria subfusca (Ledeb. ex Nordm.) Mosyakin, Fedor. & McNeill
- Aria sudetica (Tausch) Beck
- Aria taurica (Zinserl.) Sennikov & Kurtto
- Aria tergestina (H.Lindb.) Sennikov & Kurtto
- Aria thaiszii (Soó) Sennikov & Kurtto
- Aria thayensis (M.Lepší & P.Lepší) Sennikov & Kurtto
- Aria tobani (C.Németh) Mosyakin, Fedor. & McNeill
- Aria torminalis (L.) Beck
- Aria udvardyana (Somlyay & Sennikov) Mosyakin, Fedor. & McNeill
- Aria ujhelyii (Somlyay & Sennikov) Sennikov & Kurtto
- Aria ulmifolia (Kárpáti) Sennikov & Kurtto
- Aria umbellata (Desf.) Sennikov & Kurtto
- Aria vajdae (Boros) Sennikov & Kurtto
- Aria vallerubusensis (C.Németh) Mosyakin, Fedor. & McNeill
- Aria vallusensis (C.Németh) Mosyakin, Fedor. & McNeill
- Aria vertesensis (Boros) Mosyakin, Fedor. & McNeill
- Aria veszpremensis (Barabits) Mosyakin, Fedor. & McNeill
- Aria vexans (E.F.Warb.) Sennikov & Kurtto - Bloody whitebeam
- Aria whiteana (T.C.G.Rich & L.Houston) Sennikov & Kurtto - White's whitebeam
- Aria wilmottiana (E.F.Warb.) Sennikov & Kurtto - Wilmott's whitebeam
- Aria wyensis D.Green
- Aria zertovae (Kárpáti) Mosyakin, Fedor. & McNeill
- Aria zolyomii (Soó) Sennikov & Kurtto
- Aria zuzanae (Májovský & Bernátová) Mosyakin, Fedor. & McNeill

== Conservation ==
Numerous species are critically endangered and threatened with extinction, such as Aria eystettensis, Aria herbipolitana, Aria meierottii, Aria mergenthaleriana, or Aria perlonga.
