= Aria adamii =

Conservation status
- Critically Endangered (IUCN 3.1)

Scientific classification
- Kingdom: Plantae
- Clade: Tracheophytes
- Clade: Angiosperms
- Clade: Eudicots
- Clade: Rosids
- Order: Rosales
- Family: Rosaceae
- Genus: Aria
- Species: A. adamii

Binomial name
- Aria adamii (Kárpáti) Mosyakin, Fedor. & McNeill
- It is endemic to the Vértes Mountains, Hungary

Synonyms
- Karpatiosorbus adamii (Kárpáti) Sennikov & Kurtto; Pyrus adamii (Kárpáti) M.F.Fay & Christenh.; Sorbus adamii Kárpáti

Species of tree in the family Rosaceae

Aria adamii is a species of tree in the family Rosaceae endemic to Hungary. It is threatened with extinction.

== Description ==
Aria adamii is a tree.

== Taxonomy ==
It was first described as Sorbus adamii Kárpáti by Zoltan Kárpáti in 1949. It was moved to the genus Aria (Pers.) J.Jacq. ex Host as Aria adamii (Kárpáti) Mosyakin, Fedor. & McNeill by Sergei Leonidovich Mosyakin, Mykola Mykhaylovych Fedoronchuk, and John McNeill in 2025.

== Distribution and habitat ==
It is endemic to the Vértes Mountains, Hungary, where it occurs in an area of 44 km^{2} growing on open, rocky sides of deep valleys in forested areas.

== Conservation ==
Aria adamii is a critically endangered species with a small population of only 25 mature trees. In the Red List of threatened tree and shrub species of Hungary, it is also categorised as critically endangered. It is cultivated in 6 ex situ conservation collections.
