= List of endemic species of the British Isles =

The British Isles have few endemic species due to past frequent glaciations and because of the proximity to Continental Europe and former land bridges which enabled species to re-colonise the islands from the continent following glaciations. Most endemic taxa to the British Isles are considered to be subspecies of a more widely spread species, with mutations or adaptations slightly changing the species in the islands or in certain localities.

British conservationists often describe this as a "wiped clean effect" with repeated glaciations forcing many species out of the modern area of the islands to more southern latitudes in Europe and perhaps even driving some species extinct.

Some species which were present in Britain before past glaciations, often during periods with a warmer climate than now, failed to return after the Last Glacial Maximum. Amongst these are Rhododendron ponticum and rabbits, both now considered invasive and non-native.

A species is only deemed native if it reached the British Isles without human intervention (either intentional or unintentional). That means that to be native the species must have reached Britain before the land bridge joining Britain to the continent was submerged. Alternatively, species can also be native when they have flown or swum to Britain, as is the case with many bird species which arrived after the submersion of the land bridge, a recent example of which is the collared dove which arrived in the 1950s. This also applies for plants which spread seed in the wind.

A few endemic species are Arctic-Alpine species, survivors of Arctic species of plants and animals which either adapted to the warming climate or became isolated in suitable areas of mountains or lakes which still retained a suitable micro-climate. A common misconception is that the entirety of the British Isles was under glaciers and was uninhabitable both for humans, plants and animals. Whilst unsuitable for most species, a number of Arctic species survived in the areas not under glaciers in southern areas of England, Wales and south west Ireland and were either driven to extinction in the British Isles or to micro-climatic refuges as the climate warmed and the Arctic conditions retreated north.

Most endemic species or subspecies however date to more recent, post-glacial times, many having spread via land bridges or along the Atlantic seaboard of Europe.

== Origins of endemic species ==
- Ice Age survivors in suitable micro-climates
- Subspecies (offshoots) of a larger species, many may in turn develop into new species
- Glacial or pre-glacial survivors which have become extinct across much of their former range or have never occurred outside of Britain.

== Fungi ==
- Geastrum britannicum – An earthstar fungus, first seen in Norfolk by Jonathan Revett, and confirmed as a distinct species in 2015. It has so far (2015) been found in at least fifteen locations in England and Wales.. This species may actually be a non-native species in Britain which remains undiscovered in its native range. It has now been found at several sites in mainland Europe.
- Gibellula attenboroughii - A parasitic fungi discovered in 2021 in Northern Ireland in an abandoned gunpowder storeroom at Castle Espie. It uses arachnid species as a host to spread its spores. Endemic to the island of Ireland.

== Bryophytes ==
- Cornish path-moss (Ditrichum cornubicum) – endemic to Cornwall (a recent discovery in West Cork is probably an accidental introduction)
- Derbyshire feathermoss (Thamnobryum angustifolium) – endemic to a single site in the Derbyshire Peak District.
- Dixon's thread moss (Bryum dixonii) – Scotland only
- Scottish thread moss (Pohlia scotica) – Scotland only
- Scottish beard moss (Bryoerythrophyllum caledonicum) – Scotland only

== Vascular plants ==
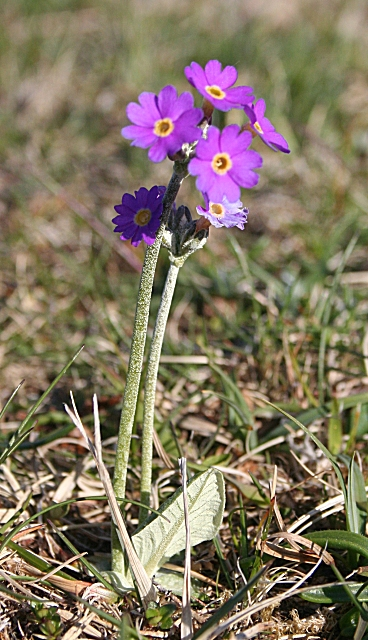
Primula scotica, endemic to the north of Scotland and Orkney

In 1999, 47 species of flowering plants (430 including microspecies) were considered to be endemic to the British Isles, 32 of them in the "critical genera" Euphrasia, Limonium and Sorbus. Further additions are made from time to time, as cited below.

- Alchemilla minima (This is now no longer considered a species)
- Aria avonensis
- Aria cambrensis
- Aria cheddarensis
- Aria eminens
- Aria eminentiformis
- Aria eminentoides
- Aria evansii
- Aria greenii
- Aria herefordensis
- Aria hibernica
- Aria lancastriensis
- Aria leighensis
- Aria margaretae
- Aria porrigentiformis
- Aria richii
- Aria rupicoloides
- Aria spectans
- Aria stenophylla
- Aria stirtoniana
- Aria vexans
- Aria wilmottiana
- Aria wyensis
- Aria × leptophylla
- Aria × robertsonii
- Athyrium flexile
- Bromus interruptus
- Calamagrostis scotica
- Centaurium tenuiflorum subsp. anglicum
- Cerastium nigrescens
- Cochlearia atlantica
- Cochlearia micacea
- Coincya wrightii
- Coincya monensis subsp. monensis
- Cotoneaster cambricus
- Epipactis youngiana
- Erythranthe peregrina
- Euphrasia anglica
- Euphrasia cambrica
- Euphrasia campbelliae
- Euphrasia heslop-harrisonii
- Euphrasia marshallii
- Euphrasia pseudokerneri
- Euphrasia rivularis
- Euphrasia rotundifolia
- Euphrasia vigursii
- Fumaria occidentalis
- Fumaria purpurea
- Gentianella anglica
- Hedlundia anglica
- Hedlundia arranensis
- Hedlundia cuneifolia
- Hedlundia leyana
- Hedlundia motleyi
- Hedlundia minima
- Hedlundia pseudofennica
- Hedlundia pseudomeinichii
- Hedlundia scannelliana
- Hieracium angustatiforme
- Hieracium apheles
- Hieracium attenboroughianum
- Hieracium breconense
- Hieracium fissuricola
- Hieracium subbritannicum
- Karpatiosorbus admonitor
- Karpatiosorbus bristoliensis
- Karpatiosorbus devoniensis
- Karpatiosorbus houstoniae
- Karpatiosorbus subcuneata
- Limonium britannicum
- Limonium dodartiforme
- Limonium loganicum
- Limonium paradoxum
- Limonium parvum
- Limonium procerum
- Limonium recurvum
- Limonium transwallianum
- Primula scotica
- Senecio cambrensis
- Sorbus × proctoriana
- Sorbus × pseudoporrigentiformis
- Ulmus minor 'Plotii'

Subsequently, Hieracium attenboroughianum is an endemic plant which was discovered in the Brecon Beacons in 2004 and Hedlundia pseudomeinichii was discovered on the island of Arran in 2007. In 2015, a newly formed and endemic species of monkeyflower (Erythranthe peregrina) was identified in Scotland and the Scottish islands. Bromus interruptus is an endemic to England, which was extinct in the wild but has been reintroduced from saved seed and is now found at three sites in England. The total number of endemic plant species has now grown to 52.

== Spiders ==
- Nothophantes horridus Merrett & Stevens, 1995 – the ground-weaver spider is found at four sites in Plymouth, Devon.

== Amphipoda (freshwater) ==
- Microniphargus leruthi – found across Ireland, Wales and Southern England. Comprises three 'cryptic species'.
- Niphargus glennei (Spooner) – the south-western ground water shrimp is found in Cornwall and Devon. Most sites for this species have been discovered in the last fifteen years.
- Niphargus irlandicus – found in aquifers and cave systems across most of southern and central Ireland
- Niphargus wexfordensis – found in Wexford, Ireland

== Insects ==
- Eudarcia richardsoni (Walsingham, 1900) – a micromoth only found on the Dorset coast
- Piesma quadratum spergulariae – a Heteroptera bug found on the Isles of Scilly
- Bombus muscorum scyllonius (Richards), Scilly bee – a bumble bee, which in the 1960s was found on all the inhabited islands of the Isles of Scilly with the exception of Bryher, and currently is only known from St Agnes, Great Ganilly and Great Arthur.
- Psylliodes luridipennis, Lundy cabbage flea beetle – known only from the island of Lundy, where it feeds upon the Lundy cabbage.
- Ceutorhynchus contractus var. pallipes – a weevil that, like the Lundy cabbage flea beetle, is known only from the island of Lundy, where it feeds upon the Lundy cabbage.
- Papilio machaon britannicus – a subspecies of swallowtail butterfly confined to the Norfolk broads
- Erebia epiphron mnemon – a subspecies of the alpine mountain ringlet butterfly
- Perlodes mortoni – a stonefly with bracypterous males
- Capnia vidula anglica – a subspecies of stonefly found in Scotland
- Brachyptera putata – a stonefly mostly found in Scotland, with limited records in the River Usk in Wales and the Wye in Hereford It is now considered extinct in England and Wales and now only exists in Scotland.
- Taeniopteryx nebulosa britannica – a stonefly found in northern Great Britain
- Botanophila fonsecai – a small seed fly endemic to a 100m stretch of sand in Scotland
- Psammoporus insularis – a scarab beetle
- Reliquantha variipes – an anthomyzid fly
- Molophilus pusillus – a crane fly
- Creagdhubhia mallochorum – a fungus gnat
- Thinobius newberyi – a rove beetle
- Halobrecta princeps – a rove beetle
- Cixius caledonicus – a planthopper
- Ceratophyllus fionnus – a flea
- Dilta chateri – a bristletail
- Nothogeophilus turki - a centipede

== Isopods ==
- Celtic woodlouse (Metatrichoniscoides celticus) (Oliver & Trew, 1981) — a small woodlouse usually below 2.5 mm. It was previously found only on maritime cliffs in the Vale of Glamorgan from Ogmore-by-Sea to St Donat's, until 2019, when a specimen was discovered on the island of Anglesey in north Wales. In 2020, the species was subsequently found in England for the first time, discovered at an allotment in Bristol. This species is listed by the IUCN as near threatened due to its small geographic range.

== Birds ==
Britain has few endemic species of birds but quite a few subspecies. A few Arctic-Alpine species have subspecies in the British Isles, some have been in the islands since the last Ice Age, but many spread in the immediate Sub-Arctic conditions as the ice retreated. Furthermore, these species were later reinforced by newer arrivals as the climate assumed temperatures and conditions more similar to the present day.

- Red grouse – formerly classed as an endemic subspecies of willow grouse, now considered to be a separate endemic species – does not change plumage in winter as the willow grouse does – upland and moorland areas of Great Britain and Ireland. There are separate Irish and British subspecies.
- Pied wagtail – British subspecies of the pied / white wagtail – throughout British Isles.
- Shetland wren – Shetland Islands, Scotland only.
- Fair Isle wren – Fair Isle, Scotland only.
- St Kilda wren – St Kilda Islands, Scotland only.
- Scottish crossbill – highlands, Scotland only.
- Scottish crested tit – subspecies of the crested tit, Scotland only.
- British long-tailed tit – subspecies of the long-tailed tit, Britain and Ireland only.
- British lesser spotted woodpecker - subspecies of the lesser spotted woodpecker, England and Wales only
- British Isles subspecies of white-throated dipper.

== Mammals ==
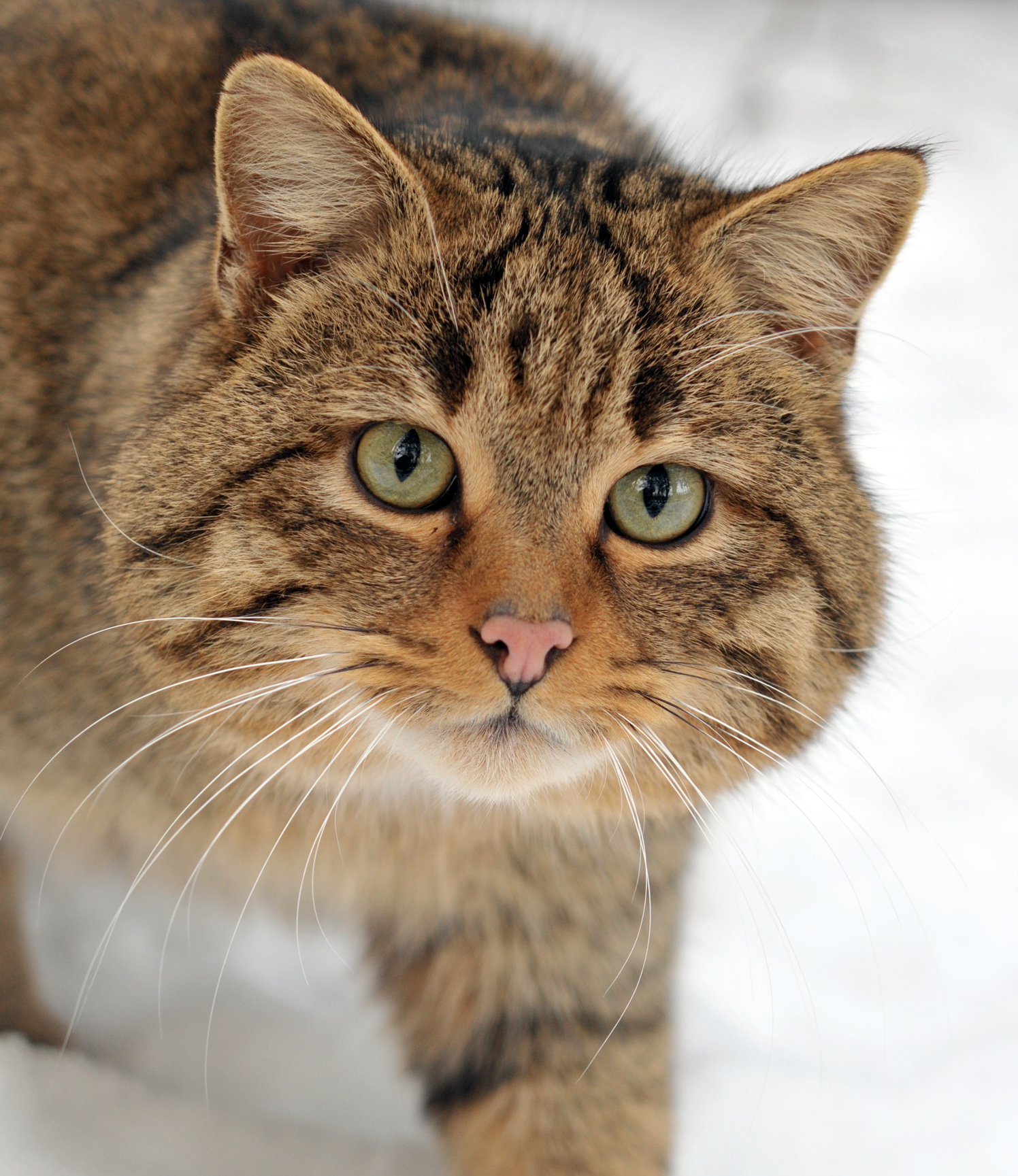
Scottish wildcat

Britain has a few subspecies of mammals but no endemic species. Many again are Ice Age survivors that adapted to the new conditions; others arrived in warmer conditions whilst the land bridge still existed.

- Irish hare — The Irish subspecies of the mountain hare. Mountain hares are also found in other locations of the British Isles, but in Ireland have the distinction of not turning white in winter.
- Irish stoat — A subspecies of stoat found only in Ireland and the Isle of Man. Like the Irish hare, its distinguishing trait is that it does not turn white in the winter.
- Scottish red deer
- Scottish wildcat — Formerly also found in Northern England and Wales, this is often described as an endemic subspecies of the European wildcat but is now regarded as being the same as those found in mainland Europe. In Britain, it is now restricted to a few locations in Scotland largely due to hunting and hybridisation with domestic cats
- St Kilda field mouse — St Kilda Islands only. A subspecies of the wood mouse.
- Orkney vole — Orkney only. A subspecies of the common vole which was originally brought (either deliberately or accidentally) to Orkney by Neolithic people.
- Guernsey vole — Guernsey only. A subspecies of the common vole that exhibits island gigantism.
- Skomer vole — Skomer Island only. A subspecies of the bank vole.
- Canna mouse — Canna, Scotland only. A subspecies of the house mouse.

== Aquatic fauna ==
=== Cnidaria ===
The Cnidaria are a group of animals found exclusively in aquatic and mostly marine environments. They include sea anemones, sea pens and corals and their distinguishing feature is cnidocytes, specialized cells that they use mainly for capturing prey.

- Ivell's sea anemone (Edwardsia ivelli) — Widewater Lagoon in West Sussex only. First described in 1975, this species is listed by the IUCN as critically endangered (possibly extinct) and has not been sighted since 1983.

=== Fish ===
In some areas of uplands in the British Isles the retreating glaciers left melt water in hollows which had been carved out by the movement of ice. In these, Arctic species of fish survived, due often to the sheer depth of the lakes and the colder temperatures. For the young endemic fish varieties of the British Isles, it is usually controversial whether they should be considered as distinct taxa (species or subspecies) or just as isolated populations of their ancestral species.

As global warming affects the British climate there is some concern for these species, some confined to a handful of lakes. Action has been taken to protect them, as is the case with vendace which has been moved to tarns in nearby mountains due to the cooler temperatures. It is hoped that these will act as refuges should the species die-out in the lower-level lakes where they occur naturally.

- Killarney shad (Alosa killarnensis) – Ireland only
- Gwyniad (Coregonus pennantii) – Snowdonia only
- Schelly (Coregonus stigmaticus) – Lake District only
- Vendace (Coregonus vandesius) – Lake District and Dumfries and Galloway only
- Pollan (Coregonus pollan) – Ireland only
- Powan (Coregonus clupeoides) – Scotland only
- Ferox trout (Salmo ferox) – Ireland, Scotland, Cumbria and Wales only, validity questionable (possibly a brown trout variant)
- Gillaroo (Salmo stomachicus) – Ireland only
- Sonaghan (Salmo nigripinnis) – Ireland only
- Haddy charr (Salvelinus killinensis) – Scotland only
- Salvelinus colii – Republic of Ireland only
- Salvelinus fimbriatus – Republic of Ireland only
- Salvelinus gracillimus – Shetland Islands and perhaps Scotland
- Melvin charr (Salvelinus grayi) – Ireland only
- Orkney charr (Salvelinus inframundus) – Orkney Islands (where extirpated) and Scotland only
- Salvelinus lonsdalii – Cumbria only
- Salvelinus mallochi – Scotland only
- Salvelinus maxillaris – Scotland only
- Salvelinus obtusus – Republic of Ireland only
- Salvelinus perisii – Wales only
- Salvelinus struanensis – Scotland only
- Golden charr (Salvelinus youngeri) – Scotland only
- Salvelinus willughbii – Cumbria only

== Extinct ==
- Presumed British subspecies of the grey wolf (Canis lupus)
- Essex emerald moth (Thetidia smaragdaria maritima, a British subspecies)
- St Kilda house mouse (Mus musculus muralis, subspecies of the house mouse from St. Kilda)
- Large copper butterfly (Lycaena dispar dispar)
- Presumed British strain of the subspecies of the Old British/Irish black bee (Apis mellifera mellifera) - possibly extant.
- Hieracium cambricogothicum

== Distribution ==
The distribution of endemic species seems to have a north western bias and with endemic species on the whole showing an oceanic / alpine distribution with most endemics being found in upland areas or islands.

== Endemic livestock breeds ==
Human bred-animals are not usually classified as distinct subspecies but rather breeds which is a similar concept. However some animals such as Iron Age pigs are classified as a distinct species from their wild relatives.

== See also ==
- List of extinct animals of the British Isles – many species listed became extinct due to the retreat of Arctic conditions after the last Ice Age or due to man, many now surviving in the Arctic.
- List of extinct plants of the British Isles
- Insular dwarfism
- Insular gigantism
- Fauna of Great Britain
- Fauna of Ireland
- Flora of Great Britain
