= List of trees of Great Britain and Ireland =

Many lists of trees of Great Britain and Ireland have been written. There are a number of issues surrounding the inclusion of a species in such a list. As can be seen from the outline of debate below, there is no 'correct' list of trees of Britain and Ireland.

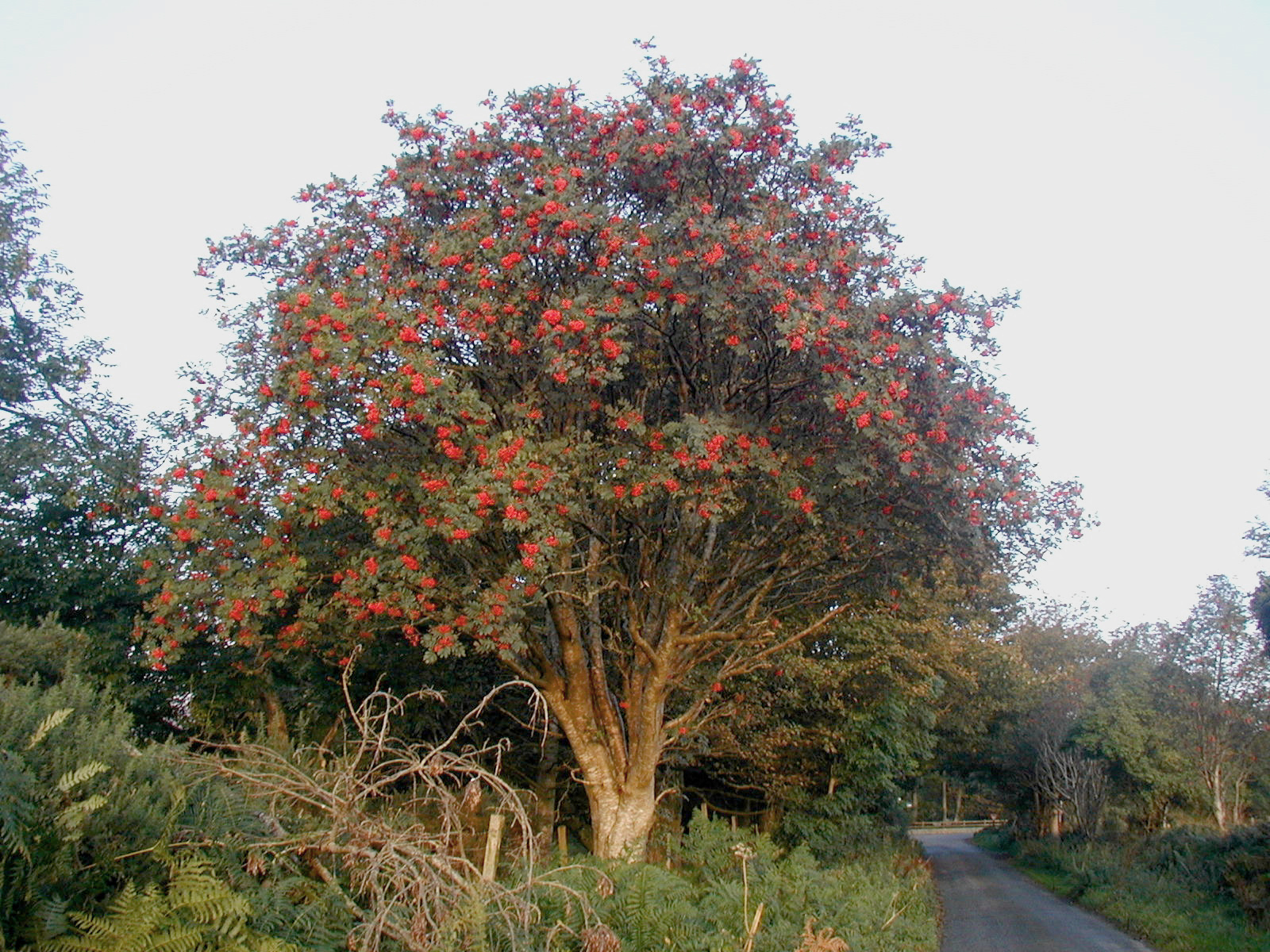
Rowan tree in Wicklow, Ireland

== Issues of debate ==
=== Definition of species ===
There are a number of different opinions regarding the validity of some species, notably apomictic microspecies and whether some 'species' may actually be hybrids. In particular, the number and definition of species in the genera Sorbus (rowans, whitebeams etc.), Ulmus (elms) and Salix (willows) are open to debate.

=== Definition of native ===
Native species are considered to be species which are today present in the region in question, and have been continuously present in that region since a certain period of time. When applied to Britain and Ireland, three possible definitions of this time constraint are:

- a species that colonised these islands during the retreat of ice at the end of the last ice age
- a species that was present in these islands when the English Channel was created and the land bridge between Britain and continental Europe was flooded
- a species that has colonised without human assistance; in some cases this is uncertain.

The only endemic tree species in Britain and Ireland (that is, that are native only to this region) are some apomictic whitebeams.

Species that were native in the region in prehistory before the last ice age, but not subsequently, are generally regarded as extinct and no longer native.

Many additional species have been imported by humans; the total list of all introduced trees numbers several thousand. A far smaller number of these have become widely naturalised, spreading by their own accord without recourse to further human assistance.

=== Definition of tree ===
A tree can be defined as a large, perennial, woody plant with secondary branches supported by a primary stem (compare with shrub). There is no set definition regarding minimum size, though most authors cite a tree species as being one which regularly reaches 6 m (20 ft) tall with a single stem. Species like blackthorn (Prunus spinosa) and purple willow (Salix purpurea), which may reach 6 m (20 ft) but not on a single stem, are not treated as trees.

== List of species ==
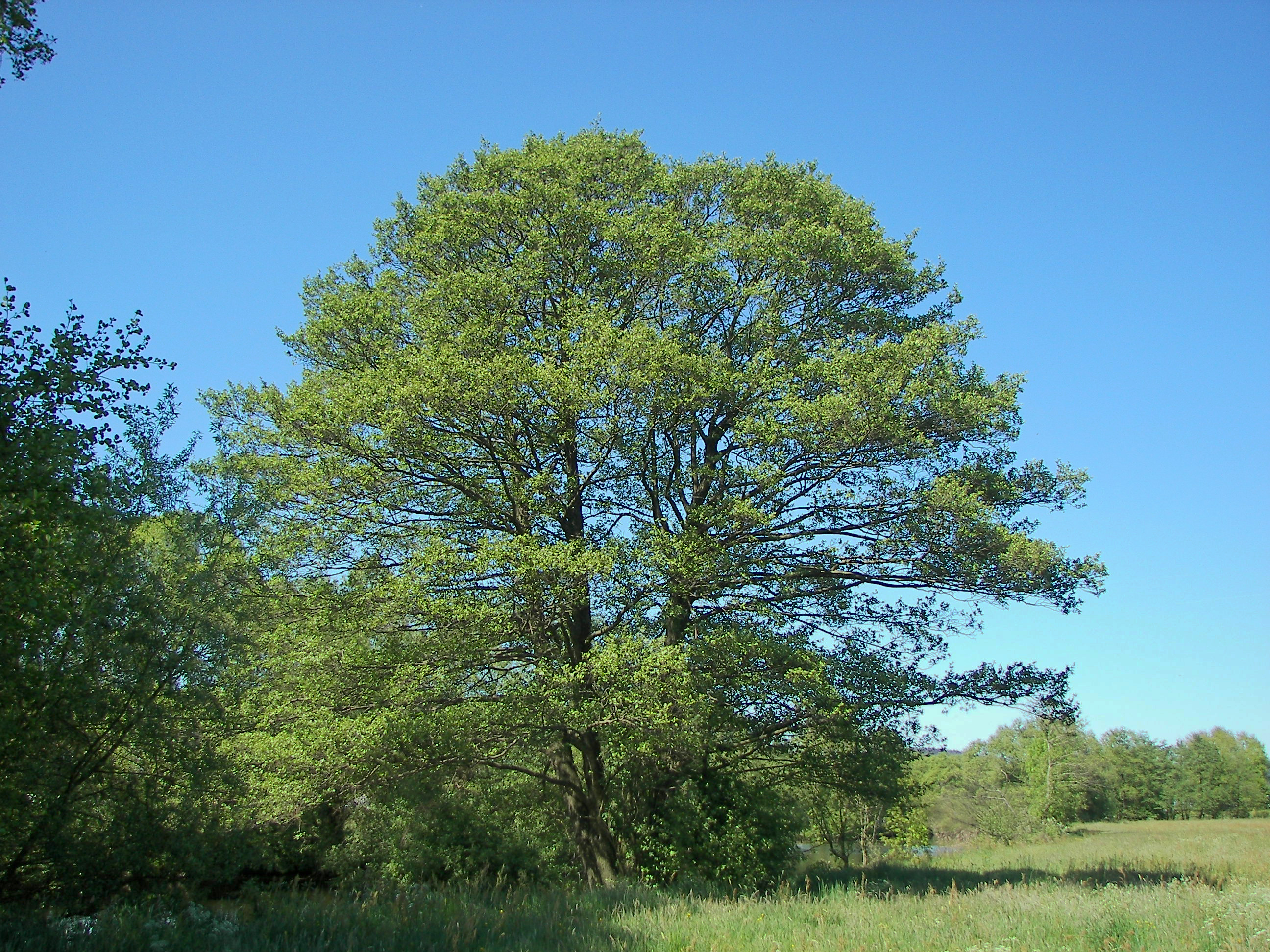
Alnus glutinosa

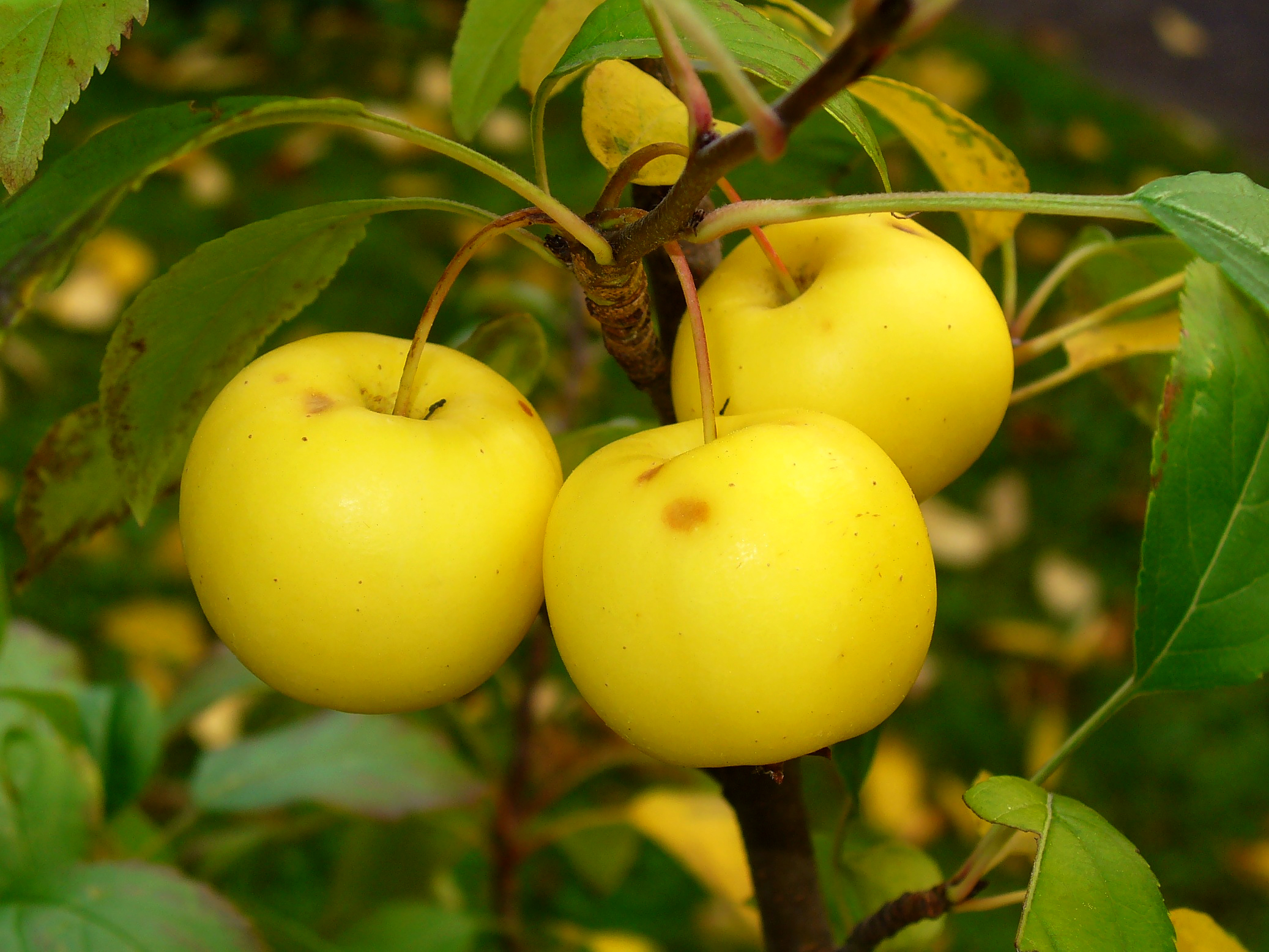
Malus sylvestris

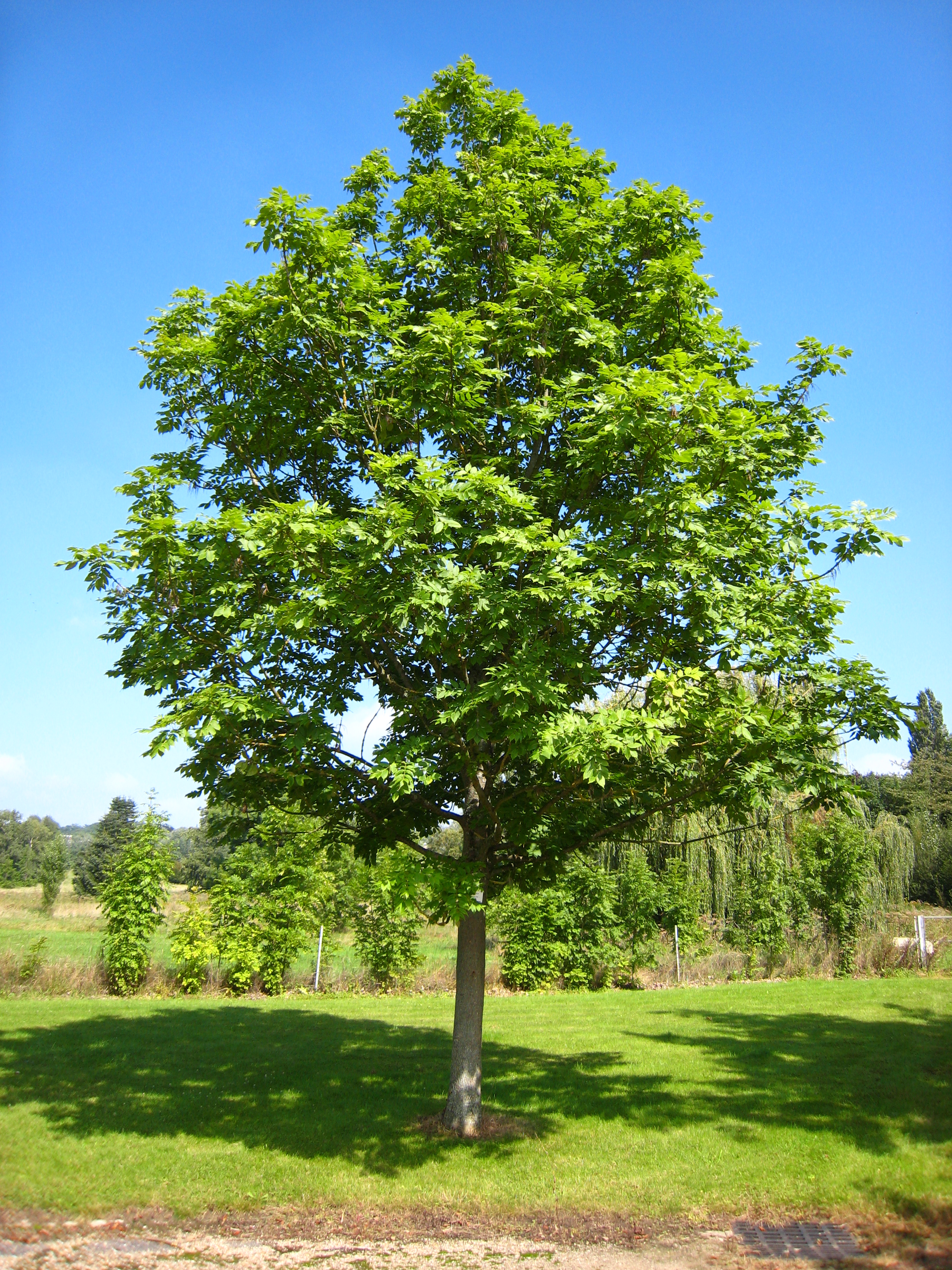
Fraxinus excelsior

=== Native trees ===
Listing order follows taxonomic order per Mitchell 1974.

- Yews
  - European yew (Taxus baccata)
- Junipers
  - Common juniper (Juniperus communis; usually a shrub, but occasionally develops tree form)
- Pines
  - Scots pine (Pinus sylvestris)
- Poplars
  - Aspen (Populus tremula)
  - Black poplar (Populus nigra; southern Great Britain only)
- Willows (Salix spp.; several species, but mostly shrubs rather than trees)
  - Bay willow (Salix pentandra)
  - Grey willow (Salix cinerea; usually a shrub, but occasionally develops tree form)
  - Goat willow (Salix caprea)
- Birches
  - Silver birch (Betula pendula)
  - Downy birch (Betula pubescens)
- Alders
  - Alder (Alnus glutinosa)
- Hornbeams
  - European hornbeam (Carpinus betulus; southern Great Britain only)
- Hazels
  - Common hazel (Corylus avellana; usually a shrub, but occasionally develops tree form)
- Beeches
  - European beech (Fagus sylvatica; native status disputed; did not reach Britain until over 2,000 years after the Channel formed, with Neolithic introduction likely, for its nuts as a food source)
- Oaks
  - Pedunculate oak (Quercus robur)
  - Sessile oak (Quercus petraea)
  - Hybrid oak (Quercus × rosacea) – widespread as a natural hybrid between Q. robur and Q. petraea.
- Elms
  - Wych elm (Ulmus glabra)
  - Field elm (Ulmus minor; variable aggregate with many cultivars often formerly treated as species)
- Hawthorns
  - Common hawthorn (Crataegus monogyna)
  - Midland hawthorn (Crataegus laevigata; southern Great Britain only)
  - Crataegus × media – occurs as an occasional natural hybrid where C. monogyna and C. laevigata grow together.
- Rowans and whitebeams
  - European rowan (Sorbus aucuparia)
  - Common whitebeam (Aria edulis, syn. Sorbus aria) and several related apomictic microspecies
  - Service tree (Cormus domestica, syn. Sorbus domestica; discovered growing wild on a cliff in south Wales in the 1990s)
  - Wild service tree (Torminalis glaberrima, syn. Sorbus torminalis)
- Apples
  - Crab apple (Malus sylvestris)
- Cherries and plums
  - Wild cherry (Prunus avium)
  - Bird cherry (Prunus padus)
- Box
  - Box (Buxus sempervirens)
- Hollies
  - European holly (Ilex aquifolium)
- Maples
  - Field maple (Acer campestre; southern Great Britain only)
- Limes
  - Small-leaved lime (Tilia cordata; southern Great Britain only)
  - Large-leaved lime (Tilia platyphyllos; southwestern Great Britain only)
- Strawberry-trees
  - Strawberry-tree (Arbutus unedo; Ireland only; recent genetic studies suggest that it is not native, but an early Bronze Age introduction.)
- Ashes
  - Common ash (Fraxinus excelsior)

=== Native large shrubs ===
These larger shrubs occasionally reach tree height, but not on a single stem so do not qualify as trees:

- Eared willow (Salix aurita)
- Purple willow (Salix purpurea)
- Rock whitebeam (Sorbus rupicola)
- Blackthorn (Prunus spinosa)
- Alder buckthorn (Frangula alnus)
- Purging buckthorn (Rhamnus cathartica)
- Dogwood (Cornus sanguinea)
- Common privet (Ligustrum vulgare)
- Elder (Sambucus nigra)
- Sea-buckthorn (Hippophae rhamnoides)
- Spindle (Euonymus europaeus)
- Guelder rose (Viburnum opulus)
- Wayfaring tree (Viburnum lantana)

=== Endemic species ===
An endemic species is a plant only native to a certain area. Outside this area, unless spread naturally it is considered non-native, usually as a result of cultivation. Britain and Ireland have few endemic trees, most being micro-species of whitebeam. But there are some interesting endemic trees nevertheless.

- Apomictic whitebeams endemic to the British Isles:
  - Sorbus arranensis – Isle of Arran only.
  - Arran service tree – Isle of Arran only.
  - Sorbus pseudomeinichii – Isle of Arran only.
  - Lancashire whitebeam – North Lancashire & South Cumbria, around Morecambe Bay only.
  - English whitebeam – Great Britain and Ireland only.
  - Bristol whitebeam – Avon Gorge only.
  - Devon whitebeam – Devon, Somerset, Cornwall and Ireland only.
  - Ley's whitebeam – Brecon Beacons only.
  - Lesser whitebeam – Brecon Beacons only.
  - Sorbus leptophylla – endemic to UK
  - Sorbus arvonensis – endemic to the Menai Strait region of North Wales.
  - Sorbus wilmottiana – endemic to UK
  - Bloody whitebeam – Exmoor only.
  - Somerset whitebeam – coastal North Devon and Western Somerset only.
  - Cheddar whitebeam – Cheddar Gorge only.
  - Watersmeet whitebeam – North Devon only.
  - Llangollen whitebeam – Llangollen only.
  - Irish whitebeam – Ireland only.
  - Leigh Woods whitebeam – Leigh Woods only.

=== Naturalised trees ===
- From Europe
  - Silver fir (Abies alba)
  - Caucasian fir (Abies nordmanniana; rarely)
  - European larch (Larix decidua)
  - Norway spruce (Picea abies; rarely)
  - Caucasian spruce (Picea orientalis; rarely)
  - Serbian spruce (Picea omorika; rarely)
  - Macedonian pine (Pinus peuce; rarely)
  - European black pine (Pinus nigra; rarely)
  - Maritime pine (Pinus pinaster; in southern England)
  - White poplar (Populus alba; vegetative [root suckers] only)
  - Canadian poplar (Populus × canadensis; by hybridisation between native black poplar and eastern cottonwood)
  - Grey poplar (Populus × canescens; by hybridisation between native aspen and naturalised white poplar)
  - Crack willow (Salix fragilis; formerly considered native but now known to be an archaeophyte)
  - White willow (Salix alba; formerly considered native but now known to be an archaeophyte)
  - Grey alder (Alnus incana)
  - Italian alder (Alnus cordata)
  - Sweet chestnut (Castanea sativa; a Roman introduction)
  - Holm oak (Quercus ilex)
  - Turkey oak (Quercus cerris)
  - Dutch elm (Ulmus × hollandica; by hybridisation between Wych elm and Field elm)
  - English elm (Ulmus minor 'Atinia'; a Roman introduction, vegetative [root suckers] only)
  - European White elm (Ulmus laevis; rarely lowland Britain)
  - Service Tree of Fontainebleau (Aria latifolia; occassionally lowland Britain)
  - Swedish whitebeam (Hedlundia intermedia)
  - Vosges whitebeam (Hedlundia mougeotii)
  - European pear (Pyrus communis; sometimes regarded as native)
  - Plymouth pear (Pyrus cordata; sometimes regarded as native)
  - Cherry plum (Prunus cerasifera)
  - Cherry-laurel (Prunus laurocerasus)
  - Sour cherry (Prunus cerasus)
  - Alpine laburnum (Laburnum alpinum)
  - Common laburnum (Laburnum anagyroides)
  - Sycamore (Acer pseudoplatanus)
  - Norway maple (Acer platanoides)
  - Common horse-chestnut (Aesculus hippocastanum)
- From Africa
  - Atlas cedar (Cedrus atlantica; rarely)
- From Asia
  - Manna Ash (Fraxinus Ornus; mostly lowland Britain)
  - Japanese larch (Larix kaempferi)
  - Blue pine (Pinus wallichiana; rarely)
  - Tree cotoneaster (Cotoneaster frigidus)
  - Several east Asian rowans (Sorbus spp.)
- From North America
  - Coast redwood (Sequoia sempervirens; rarely)
  - Western redcedar (Thuja plicata)
  - Lawson's cypress (Chamaecyparis lawsoniana)
  - Monterey cypress (Cupressus macrocarpa; in Ireland and Cornwall, rarely further northeast)
  - Western hemlock (Tsuga heterophylla)
  - Grand fir (Abies grandis)
  - Noble fir (Abies procera)
  - Douglas-fir (Pseudotsuga menziesii)
  - Sitka spruce (Picea sitchensis)
  - Black spruce (Picea mariana; rarely)
  - Lodgepole pine (Pinus contorta)
  - Monterey pine (Pinus radiata; in Ireland and Cornwall, rarely further northeast)
  - Red oak (Quercus rubra; rarely)
  - Black cherry (Prunus serotina; rarely)
  - False acacia (Robinia Pseudoacacia; occasionally in southwest Yorkshire vegetative [root suckers] only)
- From South America
  - Willow podocarp (Podocarpus salignus; in Ireland and Cornwall)
  - Monkey-puzzle (Araucaria araucana; rarely)
  - Rauli (Nothofagus alpina; rarely)
  - Roble beech (Nothofagus obliqua; rarely)
  - Chilean myrtle (Luma apiculata; in Ireland and Cornwall)
- From Australasia
  - Cider gum (Eucalyptus gunnii; rarely)
  - Blue gum (Eucalyptus globulus; in Ireland and Cornwall)
  - Cabbage-tree (Cordyline australis)
- Intercontinental hybrids
  - Dunkeld larch (Larix × marschlinsii)
  - London plane (Platanus × hispanica, rarely)

=== Naturalised large shrubs ===
- From Europe
  - Osier (Salix viminalis)
  - Almond-leaved willow (Salix triandra)
- From Asia
  - Multiple species of cotoneaster (Cotoneaster spp.)
- From South America
  - Hardy fuchsia (Fuchsia magellanica; abundantly in Ireland and Cornwall, rarely further northeast)

== Record British trees ==
The tallest tree in Great Britain (and second-tallest tree in Europe) is a 103-year old Douglas-fir in North Wales, 71 metres (233 ft) tall

== See also ==
- Trees of the world
- Woodland management
- Coppicing
- Pollarding
- Forestry in the United Kingdom
- British National Vegetation Classification
- List of forests in Ireland
- List of forests in the United Kingdom
- Coillte
- Native trees of Ireland
