= Exmoor Coastal Heaths =

- Site of Special Scientific Interest
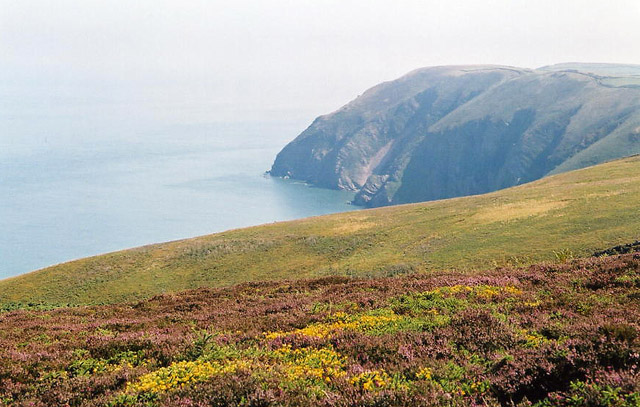

- Location within Devon
- Location of Exmoor Coastal Heaths.
- Area of search: Somerset & Devon
- Grid reference: SS620480
- Coordinates: 51.21448°N 3.97719°W
- Interest: Biological
- Area: 1,758.3 hectares (17.583 km^{2}; 6.789 sq mi)
- Notification date: 1994

Exmoor Coastal Heaths (grid reference SS620480) is a 1758.3 hectare (4344.7 acre) biological Site of Special Scientific Interest in Devon and Somerset, notified in 1994.

This site lies within the Exmoor National Park, and contains extensive areas of heathland communities. Associated particularly with the coastal communities and woods are a wide range of nationally rare and scarce plants. The site comprises four separate blocks (between Combe Martin and Minehead) centred on Trentishoe, Cosgate Hill, Countisbury and North Hill. There are two nationally rare, endemic whitebeam species which occur in the woodland areas namely Sorbus subcuneata and Sorbus vexans. Several nationally scarce plant species are found within this site; white mullein (Verbascum lychnitis) in its yellow form occurs in fields at the edge of the site, Cornish moneywort (Sibthorpia europaea) beside streams, rock stonecrop (Sedum forsteranum) on rocky seacliffs and sea storksbill (Erodium maritinum), upright chickweed (Moenchia erecta) and bird's-foot clover (Trifolium ornithopodioides) all in areas of very short turf. A nationally rare butterfly the high brown fritillary (Argynnis adippe) occurs on this site.
