= Aria wyensis =

Conservation status
- Critically Endangered (IUCN 3.1)

Scientific classification
- Kingdom: Plantae
- Clade: Tracheophytes
- Clade: Angiosperms
- Clade: Eudicots
- Clade: Rosids
- Order: Rosales
- Family: Rosaceae
- Genus: Aria
- Species: A. wyensis

Binomial name
- Aria wyensis D.Green
- It is endemic to Wales, United Kingdom

Synonyms
- Pyrus wyensis (D.Green) M.F.Fay; Sorbus wyensis (D.Green) T.C.G.Rich

Species of tree in the family Rosaceae

Aria wyensis is a species of tree in the family Rosaceae endemic to Wales, United Kingdom. It is a critically endangered species.

== Description ==
=== Vegetative characteristics ===
Aria wyensis is an up to 6 m tall, multi-trunked shrub with brown, lenticellate bark. The ovoid-conical buds are acute and pilose. The obtrullate to obovate, lobed, 7–9 cm long, and 5–6 cm wide leaves with a apically biserrate and basally entire margin have 5–7 pairs of lateral veins. The apex is acute, and the base is cuneate. The leaf has up to 3 mm deep lobes with pronounced acuminate tips. The shiny adaxial leaf surface is bright green to mat green, and the tomentose abaxial leaf surface is greyish-green with some arachnoid hairs on the veins. The petiole is 10–20 mm long.

=== Generative characteristics ===
The flat-topped, 5–6 cm wide inflorescence bears 10–14 mm wide, white flowers. The bright green, narrowly triangular sepals with a blunt tip have margins with sparsely glandular, arachnoid hairs. The orbicular, white petals are 4.0–4.5 mm long. The stamens have cream-coloured anthers with a slight pink to red tinge. The 2 styles are basally fused. The globose or almost cuboid, dark orange to red, 10–12 mm long, and 12–15 mm wide fruit bears small lenticels. The dark brown, shiny seed with two longitudinal ridges is 6–7 mm long, and 1–2 mm wide.

=== Cytology ===
It is tetraploid.

== Taxonomy ==
It was described by David Green in 2024. The type specimen was collected on the 20 July 2022 by D. E. Green in Wynd Cliff Quarry, St Arvens, Monmouthshire, Wales, United Kingdom at an altitude of 75 m above sea level.

=== Etymology ===
The specific epithet wyensis refers to the Wye Valley, Wales, United Kingdom.

== Distribution and habitat ==
It is endemic to a single quarry and adjacent cliffs in the Lower Wye Valley, Wales, United Kingdom, where it occurs in a small area of 4 km^{2} growing in a former quarry in scrub to mixed secondary woodland dominated by Fraxinus, and invasive species such as Buddleja. It grows alongside other whitebeams and relatives, such as Aria edulis, Aria eminens, Aria porrigentiformis, and Sorbus aucuparia.

== Conservation ==
Aria wyensis is a critically endangered species with a small population of 12 mature trees. Since the description of the species, when 16 individuals were reported, some individuals have died off. The population was reduced by climbers. Aria wyensis is not cultivated in any ex situ conservation collections and no seeds are held in seed banks. It is of great conservation concern and the collection of plant material is urgent.
