= Terryland Forest Park =

Park in Galway city, Ireland

- Páirc Foraoise Thír Oileáin
- Interactive map of Terryland Forest Park
- Location: Galway
- Coordinates: 53°17′11″N 9°02′27″W
- Area: 120 acres (49 ha)
- Opened: January 2000
- Administrator: Galway City Council

The Terryland Forest Park is an urban forest park in Galway, Ireland. It was launched in January 2000 as the largest such project in Ireland, with a plan to involve the citizens of Galway city in planting 500,000 native Irish trees in an area of 120 acres (0.49 km^{2}) not far from the city centre.

== Background ==
Though under the auspices of Galway City Council, it had a community presence in a multi-sectoral management steering committee which led to a high level of involvement by local people in the planning, design and programme events during the period 2000–2003.
