= Aria greenii =

- Aria greenii at the Great Doward

Conservation status
- Critically Endangered (IUCN 3.1)

Scientific classification
- Kingdom: Plantae
- Clade: Tracheophytes
- Clade: Angiosperms
- Clade: Eudicots
- Clade: Rosids
- Order: Rosales
- Family: Rosaceae
- Genus: Aria
- Species: A. greenii

Binomial name
- Aria greenii (T.C.G.Rich) Sennikov & Kurtto
- It is endemic to Herefordshire, United Kingdom

Synonyms
- Pyrus greenii (T.C.G.Rich) M.F.Fay & Christenh.; Sorbus greenii T.C.G.Rich

Species of tree in the family Rosaceae

Aria greenii, or Green's whitebeam, is a species of tree in the family Rosaceae endemic to Herefordshire, United Kingdom. It is rare and threatened with extinction.

== Description ==
Aria greenii growing at the Great Doward hill

Underside of Aria greenii foliage

=== Vegetative characteristics ===
Aria greenii is an up to 15–18 m tall tree with brownish-grey bark. The ovoid to conical, acute leaf buds are pilose. The obovate to broadly obovate, leaves of the short twigs with a truncate apex are 7.0–10.0 cm long, and 5.0–7.0 cm wide. The leaf base is cuneate. The leaves have 14–20 lateral veins. The adaxial leaf surface is dark green, and the abaxial leaf surface is greyish-green and tomentose. The petioles are 7–17 mm long.

=== Generative characteristics ===
The up to 7 cm wide, flat-topped inflorescence bears numerous 12–15 mm wide flowers. The green, triangular sepals are without glands. The 5.5–6.0 mm long, oval to orbicular petals are white. The stamens have cream-coloured anthers with faint red colouration towards the edges. The 2 pilose styles are free. The dark red, globose, 10–11 mm long, and 10–12 mm wide fruit bears few to many small lenticels.

=== Cytology ===
The chromosome count is 2n = 3x = 51. It is triploid.

== Taxonomy ==
It was first described as Sorbus greenii T.C.G.Rich by Timothy Charles Guy Rich in 2014. It was moved to the genus Aria (Pers.) J.Jacq. ex Host as Aria greenii (T.C.G.Rich) Sennikov & Kurtto by Alexander Nikolaevitsch Sennikov and Arto Kurtto in 2017. The type specimen was collected on the 16 October 2013 by T. C. G. Rich in Car Park Quarry, Great Doward, Herefordshire, United Kingdom at an elevation of 147 m above sea level. It may have only evolved recently.

=== Etymology ===
The specific epithet honours Dave Green, who first recognised it as distinct in 2011, after he found it in 2009.

== Distribution and habitat ==
It is endemic to the Great Doward hill in Herefordshire, Wye Valley, United Kingdom, where it occurs in a small area of only 8 km^{2} on the open sides of quarries and cliffs in Fraxinus-dominated forest. It grows alongside other whitebeams, including Aria edulis, Aria evansii, and Aria eminens.

== Conservation ==
Aria greenii is a critically endangered species with a small population of at least 59 individuals, of which 45 are mature trees. In the GB Red List, it is categorised as critically endangered. In the Vascular Plant Red List for England from 2014, it is categorised as endangered. The habitat is actively managed by the Forestry Commission and the County Wildlife Trust for the conservation of Aria greenii and other species. Full legal protection has been proposed for Aria greenii in 2025. No Aria greenii trees are grown in ex situ conservation collections, but seeds are preserved in seedbanks.
