= Aria herefordensis =

- Aria herefordensis branch

Conservation status
- Endangered (IUCN 3.1)

Scientific classification
- Kingdom: Plantae
- Clade: Tracheophytes
- Clade: Angiosperms
- Clade: Eudicots
- Clade: Rosids
- Order: Rosales
- Family: Rosaceae
- Genus: Aria
- Species: A. herefordensis

Binomial name
- Aria herefordensis (D.Green) Sennikov & Kurtto
- It is endemic to Herefordshire, United Kingdom

Synonyms
- Pyrus herefordensis (D.Green) M.F.Fay & Christenh.; Sorbus herefordensis D.Green

Species of tree in the family Rosaceae

Aria herefordensis, the Herefordshire whitebeam, is a species of tree in the family Rosaceae endemic to Herefordshire, United Kingdom. It is a rare and endangered species.

== Description ==
Detail of Aria herefordensis foliage

Underside of Aria herefordensis foliage

=== Vegetative characteristics ===
Aria herefordensis is an up to 20 m tall, single to multi-stemmed tree with grey bark. The ovoid, acute buds have scales with white hairs on the margins. The elliptic to obovate, thick, coriaceous, shallowly lobed, 9.0–13.0 cm long, and 6.5–9.0 cm wide leaves with a biserrate margin have 20–25 lateral veins. The apex is acute, and the base is cuneate to rounded. The glabrous adaxial leaf surface is dark green, and the densely tomentose abaxial leaf surface is white. The petiole is 12–30 mm long.

=== Generative characteristics ===
The up to 14 cm wide, lax inflorescence bears white, up to 20 mm wide flowers. The green, glabrous sepals are narrowly triangular. The white, orbicular to oval petals are 5.5–7 mm long. The stamens have cream-coloured anthers with slightly red edges. The 2 pilose styles are free. The red, broadly obovoid, 12–13 mm long, and 12–14 mm wide fruit bears numerous small lenticels.

=== Cytology ===
The chromosome count is 2n = 3x = 51. It is triploid.

== Taxonomy ==
It was first described as Sorbus herefordensis D.Green by David Green in 2014. It was moved to the genus Aria (Pers.) J.Jacq. ex Host as Aria herefordensis (D.Green) Sennikov & Kurtto by Alexander Nikolaevitsch Sennikov and Arto Kurtto in 2017. The type specimen was collected on the 16 October 2013 by T. C. G. Rich in Miners Rest, Great Doward, Herefordshire, United Kingdom at an elevation of 155 m above sea level. It may have been directly derived from Aria edulis, or it may be the result of a hybridisation event involving the diploid Aria edulis and the tetraploid Aria eminens or Aria eminentiformis, which grow in the same area.

=== Etymology ===
The specific epithet herefordensis refers to the English county of Hereford, to which Aria herefordensis is endemic.

== Distribution and habitat ==
Aria herefordensis is endemic to the Great Doward, Herefordshire, England, United Kingdom, where it occurs in a small area of 8 km^{2} in hedges and in open deciduous woodland on free-draining soils over carboniferous limestone at altitudes of 110–180 m above sea level.

== Conservation ==
Aria herefordensis is an endangered species with a small, but stable population of 80 mature trees and 38 saplings. In the Vascular Plant Red List for England, it is categorised as an endangered species (EN). Full legal protection has been proposed for Aria herefordensis. The population is found within the Miners Rest Nature Reserve. No Aria herefordensis plants are grown in ex situ conservation collections, but numerous seeds are stored in a seed bank.
