= Aria wilmottiana =

Conservation status
- Critically Endangered (IUCN 3.1)

Scientific classification
- Kingdom: Plantae
- Clade: Tracheophytes
- Clade: Angiosperms
- Clade: Eudicots
- Clade: Rosids
- Order: Rosales
- Family: Rosaceae
- Genus: Aria
- Species: A. wilmottiana

Binomial name
- Aria wilmottiana (E.F.Warb.) Sennikov & Kurtto

Synonyms
- Pyrus wilmottiana (E.F.Warb.) M.F.Fay & Christenh.; Sorbus wilmottiana E.F.Warb.

Species of flowering plant

Aria wilmottiana, commonly known as Willmott's whitebeam, is a species of whitebeam in the family Rosaceae. It is endemic to England, and is found in the Avon Gorge, in Somerset and Gloucestershire. It is threatened by habitat loss.

== Description ==
Aria wilmottiana is a small tree or shrub, up to 10m in height. It is often multistemmed, with rather upright branches.

== Distribution ==
This species is confined to the Avon Gorge, in SW England; less than 100 individuals are known.

== Ecology and evolution ==
Aria wilmottiana appears to be shade intolerant, growing in rocky scrub and grassland on shallow, mildly acidic soils. Aria wilmottiana arose from a cross between Aria edulis and Aria porrigentiformis.
