= Aria leptophylla =

Conservation status
- Endangered (IUCN 3.1)

Scientific classification
- Kingdom: Plantae
- Clade: Tracheophytes
- Clade: Angiosperms
- Clade: Eudicots
- Clade: Rosids
- Order: Rosales
- Family: Rosaceae
- Genus: Aria
- Species: A. leptophylla

Binomial name
- Aria leptophylla (E.F.Warb.) Sennikov & Kurtto

Synonyms
- Pyrus leptophylla (E.F.Warb.) M.F.Fay & Christenh.; Sorbus leptophylla E.F.Warb.

Species of flowering plant

Aria leptophylla, commonly known as the thin-leaved whitebeam, is a species of plant in the family Rosaceae. It is endemic to Wales. It is a hybrid between Aria edulis and Aria porrigentiformis.
