= Aria leighensis =

Conservation status
- Endangered (IUCN 3.1)

Scientific classification
- Kingdom: Plantae
- Clade: Tracheophytes
- Clade: Angiosperms
- Clade: Eudicots
- Clade: Rosids
- Order: Rosales
- Family: Rosaceae
- Genus: Aria
- Species: A. leighensis

Binomial name
- Aria leighensis (T.C.G.Rich) Sennikov & Kurtto

Synonyms
- Pyrus leighensis (T.C.G.Rich) M.F.Fay & Christenh.; Sorbus leighensis T.C.G.Rich

Species of flowering plant

Aria leighensis, commonly known as Leigh Woods whitebeam, is a rare species of whitebeam, a flowering plant in the rose family Rosaceae. It is named after Leigh Woods in the Avon Gorge, where it is known. DNA analysis in the 2000s classified it as a triploid apomict from A. edulis × A. porrigentiformis.

== Description ==
Aria leighensis is a small tree or shrub reaching a height of 10 m. Like other species of whitebeams, the upper surface of the leaf is a light green, while the underside is white or greyish white. Leaves are obovate, and range from 7–10.5 cm long and 5–7 cm wide.
