= Aria cheddarensis =

- Aria cheddarensis growing in its natural habitat in the Cheddar Gorge, United Kingdom

Conservation status
- Critically Endangered (IUCN 3.1)

Scientific classification
- Kingdom: Plantae
- Clade: Tracheophytes
- Clade: Angiosperms
- Clade: Eudicots
- Clade: Rosids
- Order: Rosales
- Family: Rosaceae
- Genus: Aria
- Species: A. cheddarensis

Binomial name
- Aria cheddarensis (L.Houston & Ashley Robertson) Sennikov & Kurtto
- It is endemic to the Cheddar Gorge in Somerset, United Kingdom

Synonyms
- Pyrus cheddarensis (L.Houston & Ashley Robertson) M.F.Fay & Christenh.; Sorbus cheddarensis L.Houston & Ashley Robertson

Species of tree in the family Rosaceae

Aria cheddarensis, the Cheddar whitebeam, is an apomictic species of tree in the family Rosaceae endemic to the Cheddar Gorge in Somerset, United Kingdom. It is a rare and critically endangered species.

== Description ==
Fruiting branch of Aria cheddarensis

Upper leaf surface of Aria cheddarensis leaf

=== Vegetative characteristics ===
Aria cheddarensis is an up to 7 m tall shrub or tree. The ovoid, green, apically pilose buds bear whitish hairs. The oval, shallowly lobed, 9.0–12.0 cm long, and 6.0–8.0 cm wide leaves with an uniserrate to biserrate margin have 20–24 lateral veins. The apex is obtuse to acute, and the base with a nearly entire margin is cuneate. The glabrous adaxial leaf surface is green, and the tomentose abaxial leaf surface is greenish. The petiole is 13–24 mm long.

=== Generative characteristics ===
The up to 8 cm wide inflorescence with greenish-white tomentose branchlets bears white, fragrant, 15–17 mm wide flowers. The narrowly triangular, greenish sepals are basally tomentose. The white, cupped, narrowly elliptic petals are 7–10 mm long, and 5–7 mm wide. The stamens have cream-coloured anthers occasionally with a touch of pink. The 2 green, partially fused styles have a pubescent base. The globose, red, 10.5–13.5 mm long, and 11–13 mm wide fruit bears few small to medium-sized lenticels.

=== Cytology ===
The chromosome count is 2n = 3x = 51. It is triploid.

== Taxonomy ==
It was first described as Sorbus cheddarensis L.Houston & Ashley Robertson by Libby Houston and Ashley Robertson in 2009. It was moved to the genus Aria (Pers.) J.Jacq. ex Host as Aria cheddarensis (L.Houston & Ashley Robertson) Sennikov & Kurtto by Alexander Nikolaevitsch Sennikov and Arto Kurtto in 2017. The type specimen was collected by T. C. G. Rich and L. Houston in the Cheddar Gorge, North Somerset, United Kingdom on the 19 September 2007. It is believed to be the result of the hybridisation of Aria edulis and Aria porrigentiformis.

=== Etymology ===
The specific epithet cheddarensis refers to the Cheddar Gorge in Somerset, United Kingdom.

== Distribution and habitat ==
Aria cheddarensis is endemic to the Cheddar Gorge, Somerset, United Kingdom, where it occurs in an area of 8 km^{2} growing on grassland, rocky scrub, cliffs, and old quarries on the limestone slopes and rocks at altitudes of 150–200 m above sea level. It grows alongside Aria edulis.

== Conservation ==
Aria cheddarensis is a critically endangered species with a small population of 16 saplings and 32 mature trees. In the Vascular Plant Red List for England, it is categorised as critically endangered (CR). Full legal protection has been proposed for Aria cheddarensis. It is threatened by grazing goats. The feral goats were deliberately introduced to control scrub. The grazing goats and the increased growth of Rubus affect the regeneration of Aria cheddarensis. Is is also affected by an unknown pathogen. Only two individual plants are held in an ex situ conservation collection, but numerous Aria cheddarensis seeds are stored in a seedbank.
