= Aria margaretae =

Conservation status
- Endangered (IUCN 3.1)

Scientific classification
- Kingdom: Plantae
- Clade: Tracheophytes
- Clade: Angiosperms
- Clade: Eudicots
- Clade: Rosids
- Order: Rosales
- Family: Rosaceae
- Genus: Aria
- Species: A. margaretae

Binomial name
- Aria margaretae (M.Proctor) Sennikov & Kurtto
- It is endemic to southwestern Somerset and north Devon, United Kingdom

Synonyms
- Pyrus margaretae (M.Proctor) M.F.Fay & Christenh.; Sorbus margaretae M.Proctor

Species of tree in the family Rosaceae

Aria margaretae or Margaret's whitebeam, is an apomictic species of tree in the family Rosaceae endemic to southwestern Somerset and north Devon, United Kingdom. It is an endangered species. It arose via hybridisation of Aria rupicola and Aria vexans.

== Description ==
=== Vegetative characteristics ===
Aria margaretae is an up to 6 m tall, deciduous shrub or tree. The unlobed, obovate leaves have a biserrate margin. The abaxial leaf surface is densely white-tomentose.

=== Generative characteristics ===
The inflorescence bears small, white flowers. The flower has 5 petals. The red fruit is very broad.

=== Cytology ===
The chromosome count is 2n = 4x = 68. It is tetraploid. Aria margaretae has a low genotypic diversity.

== Taxonomy ==
It was first described as Sorbus margaretae M.Proctor by Michael Charles Faraday Proctor in 2009. It was moved to the genus Aria (Pers.) J.Jacq. ex Host as Aria margaretae (M.Proctor) Sennikov & Kurtto by Alexander Nikolaevitsch Sennikov and Arto Kurtto in 2017. The type specimen was collected by M. C. F. Proctor in Desolate, North Devon, United Kingdom on the 31 May 1997.

=== Etymology ===
The specific epithet margaretae honours Margaret E. Bradshaw, who first recognised this species as distinct.

== Distribution and habitat ==
It is endemic to southwestern Somerset and north Devon, United Kingdom, where it occurs in an area of 41 km^{2} growing in coastal woodlands, coastal cliffs, and in open rocky scrub on acidic soils along the south side of the Bristol Channel. It grows alongside with Crataegus monogyna, Prunus spinosa, Fraxinus excelsior, Quercus spp., and Luzula sylvatica.

== Ecology ==
The fruits are eaten by birds.

== Conservation ==
Aria margaretae is an endangered species with a small population of at least 120 plants. The GB Red List status is Endangered. The status on the Vascular Plant Red List for England is Endangered. It is threatened by the spreading of Rhododendron ponticum along coastal cliffs. The local population near Ilfracombe, North Devon has gone extinct. It is cultivated in several ex situ conservation collections in botanic gardens. Full legal protection has been proposed for Aria margaretae. Aria margaretae seeds are collected for a species recovery project, during which saplings will be planted in prepared sites close to the parent trees.
