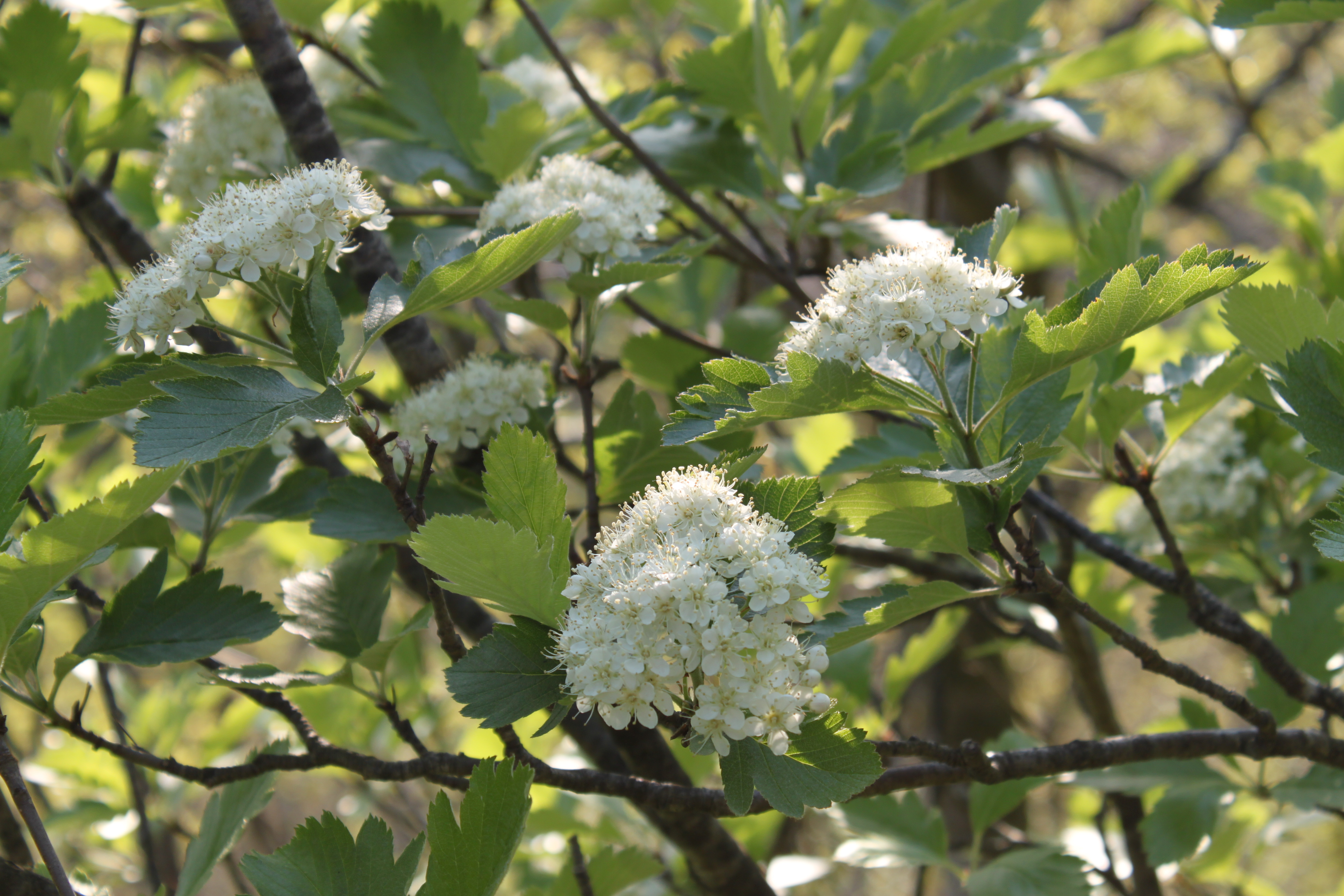

Conservation status
- Critically Endangered (IUCN 3.1)

Scientific classification
- Kingdom: Plantae
- Clade: Embryophytes
- Clade: Tracheophytes
- Clade: Spermatophytes
- Clade: Angiosperms
- Clade: Eudicots
- Clade: Rosids
- Order: Rosales
- Family: Rosaceae
- Genus: Hedlundia
- Species: H. leyana

Binomial name
- Hedlundia leyana (Wilmott) Sennikov & Kurtto

Synonyms
- Pyrus leyana (Wilmott) M.F.Fay & Christenh.; Sorbus leyana Wilmott

= Hedlundia leyana =

Species of tree

Hedlundia leyana, commonly known as Ley's whitebeam, is a species of small tree which is endemic to two sites in southern Wales. It is thought to have arisen by hybridisation between the rowan and a member of genus Aria.

== Description ==
Hedlundia leyana is a shrub or small tree which grows to 10 metres (33 ft) in the wild, although it will grow taller in cultivation. The best feature distinguishing H. leyana from its sympatric congeners is by examining the lateral rosette leaves which are normally 6.5 centimetres (2.6 in) long and 4.57 centimetres (1.80 in) across, meaning that they are 1.2-1.65 times longer than they are wide. These leaves are widest at about the middle and are deeply lobed with the lobes reaching three-quarters of the way to the leaf's midrib and the leaf margin is toothed and normally has 7-10 pairs of leaf veins. The berries are wider than they are long, slightly wider below the middle, with a few small, scattered pores and they are blood red in colour when mature.

== Distribution and population ==
Hedlundia leyana has been recorded in the wild from just two sites in the Brecon Beacons near Merthyr Tydfil, Darren Fach and Penmoelallt. These two populations are around 1 kilometre (0.62 mi) apart and the total population is around 20 trees.

== Habitat and ecology ==
Hedlundia leyana is occurs in scrub or open woodland on crags of Carboniferous limestone at locations where they have access to light. It is apomictic species which normally has a sparse crop of berries from which germination is poor and this results in only a small amount of natural regeneration taking place. On average only 24% of the pollen produced is available.

== Discovery and origin ==
Sorbus leyana was discovered by the clergyman and botanist Reverend Augustin Ley in the 19th century and was named in his honour by Alfred James Wilmott. This species is thought to have arisen from a hybrid between the rowan (Sorbus aucuparia) and either the grey whitebeam (A. rupicola) or grey whitebeam (A. porrigentiformis). It is part of a group of closely related species within the genus Hedlundia which have leaves with deep lobes and small fruits, this group includes English whitebeam (H. anglica), least whitebeam (H. minima) and the Arran whitebeam (H. arranensis).

== Conservation ==
Hedlundia leyana is restricted to two sites both of which are protected as a Site of Special Scientific Interest, Darren Fach is within the Wildlife Trust of South & West Wales reserve of Darren Fawr. The trees were "rediscovered" in the 1950s by forester Peter Charlesworth and were propagated at the National Botanic Garden of Wales. This species is threatened by grazing and shading by taller trees, regeneration appears to be reliant on access to light.
