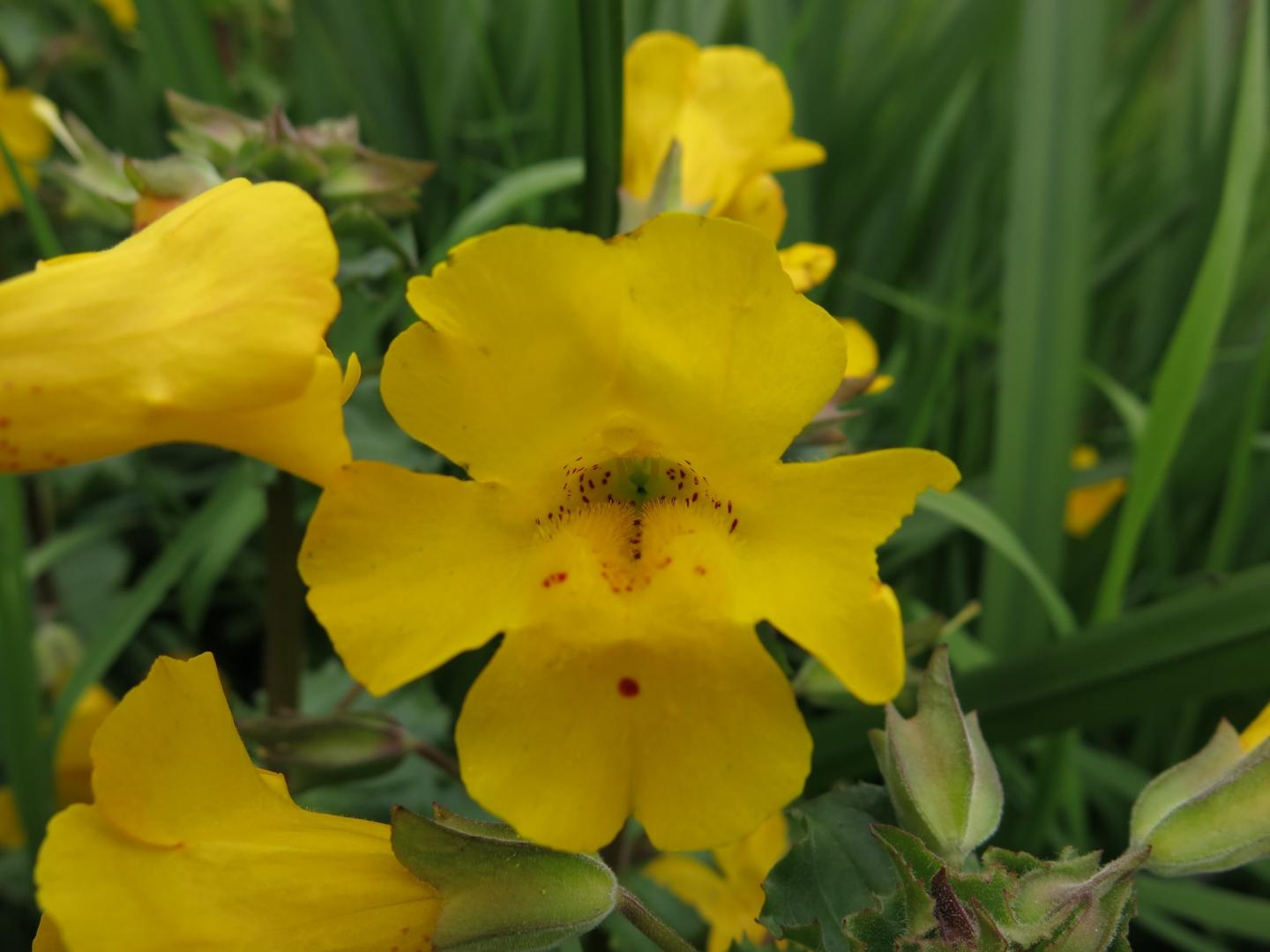

Scientific classification
- Kingdom: Plantae
- Clade: Tracheophytes
- Clade: Angiosperms
- Clade: Eudicots
- Clade: Asterids
- Order: Lamiales
- Family: Phrymaceae
- Genus: Erythranthe
- Species: E. peregrina

Binomial name
- Erythranthe peregrina (Vallejo-Marin) G.L.Nesom

Synonyms
- Mimulus peregrinus Vallejo-Marin

= Erythranthe peregrina =

Species of flowering plant

Erythranthe peregrina is a species of monkeyflower. Its Latin name means "foreign", or more loosely "the foreigner". This species is a rare example of polyploidization and speciation where sterility did not occur. It was discovered in 2011, first reported in 2012, and named Mimulus peregrinus. Around the same time, the genus Mimulus was restructured and this species is now called Erythranthe peregrina and is in the section Simiolus. The species was less than 140 years old at the time of discovery in 2011; its discoverer, Mario Vallejo-Marin of the University of Stirling, compared finding it to "looking at the big bang in the first milliseconds of its occurrence".

== Description ==
Erythranthe peregrina has a high level of pollen and seed fertility. Its vegetative and floral characteristics are intermediate between its two ancestral species, E. guttata and E. lutea. E. peregrina is a perennial herb 5–30 centimetres (2.0–11.8 in) high. The leaves are generally variable, ovate-oblong 3–14 by 1.5–4 centimetres (1.18–5.51 by 0.59–1.57 in). Petioles are about 75% as long as the blades. Pedicels are 2.5–5 centimetres (0.98–1.97 in). Sepals are 1.5–2.5 centimetres (0.59–0.98 in) and have five triangular teeth. The flowers are yellow with red spots. Throats are slightly hairy. Stamens produce large amounts of pollen. The germination rates of self-fertilized seeds is about 80%.

== Origin ==
Polyploidization is a mechanism of sympatric speciation because polyploids are usually unable to interbreed with their diploid ancestors due to the difference in chromosome numbers. Sequencing confirmed that this species originated from E. × robertsii, a sterile triploid hybrid (2n = 3x = 46) between E. guttata and E. lutea, both of which have been introduced and naturalized in the United Kingdom.

Due to allopolyploidization, complete chromosomal inheritance, E. peregrina has double the amount of genetic material, genome size and chromosomes of E. × robertsii (2n = 6x = 92). Wheat, cotton and tobacco also formed in this manner. Such an event has been rare in the last two centuries and is the first such instance in the order Lamiales. Such genetic doubling resulting in a new species is instantaneous in evolutionary terms.

== Distribution ==
Erythranthe peregrina was photographed on the banks of the River Tees, Northern England in 2005, where it was mis-identified as Mimulus luteus by Dr. Peter Llewellyn, an amateur botanist. Vallejo-Marin later collected one of its seeds on 27 August 2011 from the banks of Shortcleuch Water, near Leadhills, South Lanarkshire, in southern Scotland. Making this species even more unusual, two separate populations of E. peregrina arose independently; one on the Scottish mainland and the Orkney Islands off the coast of northern Scotland, via genome duplication from local populations of E. × robertsii, a hybrid of Erythranthe guttata from western North America and Erythranthe lutea from the Andes of South America; both of those species had been imported into Britain. Scientists had known about E. × robertsii for some time, but until 2011 had always found it to be sterile.

New species generally form in one locale and then spread to other areas. However, in this very unusual case, E. peregrina formed independently in the same way in two different areas. This proves that under the right conditions multiple independent evolution of the same species is repeatable. The two colonies are confirmed as having the same parentage but slight genetic differences show they arose independently. While the Orkney colony was discovered about 2 years after the Leadhills colony, there is no way to tell which colony developed first. Senecio cambrensis is another case of multiple independent evolution; having arisen in Wales and Scotland. About one-third of the wild hybrids in the British Isles have at least one non-native parent.
