= Guernsey vole =

Conservation status
- Least Concern (IUCN 3.1)

Scientific classification
- Kingdom: Animalia
- Phylum: Chordata
- Class: Mammalia
- Infraclass: Placentalia
- Order: Rodentia
- Family: Cricetidae
- Subfamily: Arvicolinae
- Genus: Microtus
- Species: M. arvalis
- Subspecies: M. a. sarnius

Trinomial name
- Microtus arvalis sarnius Miller, 1913

Subspecies of common vole endemic to Guernsey

The Guernsey vole (Microtus arvalis sarnius), known in Guernésiais as the mulot, is a subspecies of the common vole endemic to the island of Guernsey in the Channel Islands. It exhibits island syndrome, mainly island gigantism, meaning it is significantly larger than continental voles. The common vole is absent from the British Isles excluding Orkney.

== Taxonomy ==
The Guernsey vole was first described by American zoologist Gerrit Smith Miller in 1909. The name sarnius comes from Sarnia, the Latin name for Guernsey. In contrast to the Orkney vole, which according to genetic analysis was brought to Britain by Neolithic settlers around 5,000 years ago, the precise date on which the Guernsey vole diverged from mainland Europe is still a subject of study.

== Description ==
The Guernsey vole differs to Microtus arvalis by its exceptionally large size, which is attributable to island gigantism. On average individuals are roughly 10% larger than mainland European common voles. During a 2018 ecological survey conducted by Imperial College London, researchers captured an individual measuring 13.6 centimetres (5.4 in) in length, which was documented as the largest European common vole ever recorded. The Guernsey vole also generally has shorter fur, shorter ears and has less hair than continental voles.

In addition to gigantism, there are several other features of the subspecies attributable to island syndrome. Individuals live for longer than continental voles, females of the subspecies give birth to fewer young than those from the mainland species (around 2–5 in a litter), and the subspecies possesses island tameness towards ground predators.

== Habitat and ecology ==
The population of the Guernsey vole is estimated to be around 150,000 across the 25 square miles (65 km^{2}) island, more than the human population of Guernsey (63,950). It can be found in coniferous and deciduous woodlands, marsh and heather moorland, grassland and farmland. The species' nests generally consist of a single nest with several entrances that forms a network of runs and tunnels beneath ground surface. The same tunnels are used for successive generations of voles, and the voles sleep and raise their young in these burrows. The vole feeds on a variety of leaves, stems and roots of grasses. Breeding season for the species begins in February, and pregnant females have been found between March and November. Both parents spend long periods of time in nests with their young.

The Guernsey vole is preyed upon by domestic cats, kestrels, short eared owls and hen harriers.
