= Hieracium attenboroughianum =

Scientific classification
- Kingdom: Plantae
- Clade: Tracheophytes
- Clade: Angiosperms
- Clade: Eudicots
- Clade: Asterids
- Order: Asterales
- Family: Asteraceae
- Genus: Hieracium
- Species: H. attenboroughianum

Binomial name
- Hieracium attenboroughianum T.C.G.Rich

Species of flowering plant

Hieracium attenboroughianum, or Attenborough's hawkweed, is a species of hawkweed in the genus Hieracium, found only in the Brecon Beacons in south Wales.

It was named after the naturalist Sir David Attenborough by taxonomist Tim Rich, who said:

"I decided to name this special little plant after David Attenborough as he inspired me to study ecology when I was 17. This is a personal thank you for the years of fascination he has given me going to different places to search for new things."

Rich was one of the team that first discovered the species, in 2004. Attenborough was honoured by the naming saying:

"I am thrilled that my name has been given to the delightful new species of hawkweed [...] Bestowing a name on a new species is surely one of the greatest of biological compliments and I am truly grateful. It is an added joy that Hieracium attenboroughianum should be so beautiful and live in such a lovely part of the country"

Around 300 plants occur on Old Red Sandstone mountain ledges on Cribyn.

== Description ==
Hieracium attenboroughianum grows to about 30 cm tall, occasionally reaching 45 cm, with a slender stem that may show a faint reddish-purple flush at the base.

The leaves form a basal rosette of 4–7 dark green, slightly bluish (subglaucous) ovate leaves with characteristic upturned margins, giving them a cupped appearance. These leaves measure 3.5–7 cm long by 2.5–4.5 cm wide, with pointed tips and remotely toothed edges that are more pronounced towards the base. The upper leaf surface is nearly hairless, while the underside is paler with sparse white hairs. The leaf stalks (petioles) extend to 4 cm in length, show a reddish-purple colouration, and are covered with numerous long white hairs.

The plant typically bears no stem leaves or occasionally just one, which is often reduced to a small bract. Its flower heads (capitula) are arranged in a branched cluster of up to four flowers, each measuring 30–45 mm in diameter. The protective bracts (involucral bracts) surrounding the flower heads are greyish-green with paler margins, narrowly linear-lanceolate in shape, and pointed. These bracts feature a distinctive combination of sparse long eglandular hairs (which are black at the base and white at the tip), numerous short glandular hairs, and sparse white stellate (star-shaped) hairs primarily along the margins and base.

The flowers themselves display bright yellow ligules (ray florets) with smooth tips and yellow styles that darken with age. Following flowering, the plant produces blackish-brown seeds measuring 3–4 mm in length.

Hieracium attenboroughianum flowers from late June to mid-July in its natural habitat, though in cultivation it may bloom from late May for 2–3 weeks with occasional flowers appearing until September.

== Taxonomy ==
Hieracium attenboroughianum was first formally described as a new species by Tim Rich in 2014. The type specimen, which serves as the official reference for the species, was collected by Rich himself on 28 June 2014 from mountain ledges at 740 metres above sea level on Cribyn in the Brecon Beacons, Wales. The plant was found growing on Old Red Sandstone rock formations at grid reference SO021212, which falls within the Breconshire vice-county (v.c. 42). The holotype specimen is preserved at the Natural History Museum in London (BM), with an isotype (duplicate specimen) housed at the Cambridge University herbarium (CGE).

The species is classified is a member of the H. britannicum group in Hieracium section Stelligera Zahn. It is related to H. britannicoides, but differs in having in cupped, dark green leaves and sparse, medium simple eglandular hairs and many glandular hairs on the involucral bracts.

== See also ==
- List of things named after David Attenborough and his works
