= White mullein =

White mullein is a common name for several plants in the genus Verbascum and may refer to:

- Verbascum blattaria, native to Europe, Asia, and North Africa
- Verbascum lychnitis, native to Europe and Asia
- Verbascum thapsus, native to Europe, Asia, and North Africa
