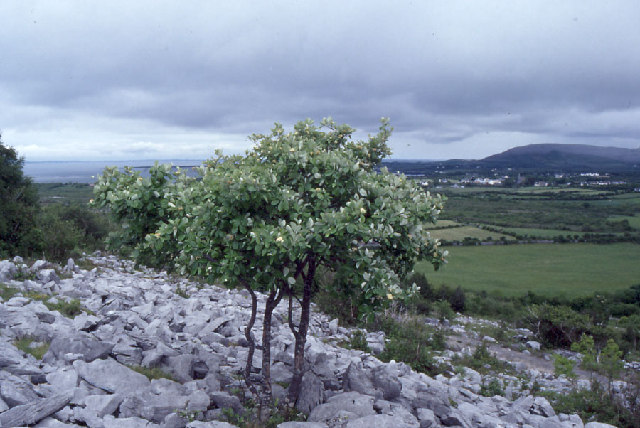
- Near Ballyvaughan, County Clare

Conservation status
- Vulnerable (IUCN 3.1)

Scientific classification
- Kingdom: Plantae
- Clade: Tracheophytes
- Clade: Angiosperms
- Clade: Eudicots
- Clade: Rosids
- Order: Rosales
- Family: Rosaceae
- Genus: Aria
- Species: A. hibernica

Binomial name
- Aria hibernica (E.F.Warb.) Sennikov & Kurtto
- It is endemic to Ireland

Synonyms
- Pyrus hibernica (E.F.Warb.) M.F.Fay & Christenh.; Sorbus hibernica E.F.Warb.

= Aria hibernica =

Species of plant

Aria hibernica, the Irish whitebeam, or Fionncholl gaelach in Irish, is an apomictic species of whitebeam endemic to Ireland. It occurs in most counties, usually as scattered individuals, or in small groups. It is a vulnerable species.

== Description ==
Aria hibernica is a small tree or shrub up to 7 m (20 ft) high with obovate, unlobed leaves and clusters of white flowers. The fruits are usually wider than long.

== Taxonomy ==
It was first described as Sorbus hibernica E.F.Warb. by Edmund Frederic Warburg in 1957. It was moved to the genus Aria (Pers.) J.Jacq. ex Host as Aria hibernica (E.F.Warb.) Sennikov & Kurtto by Alexander Nikolaevitsch Sennikov and Arto Kurtto in 2017. The type specimen was collected on the 26th of September 1938 by Edmund Frederic Warburg in Ballynahinch near Recess, Ireland.

=== Etymology ===
The specific epithet hibernica refers to Ireland, to which Aria hibernica is endemic.

== Distribution and habitat ==
Aria hibernica is found in most Irish counties, usually in ones or twos, but with occasional larger groups. Estimates of the total population range from 250 to 1000 individuals. Most trees are in the centre of the island, with some in the north and some in the southeast. It occurs in a range of habitats including mountains, woods and cliffs on limestone, gorges, lakesides, rocky pastures, hedges, roadsides and open woodland.

== Conservation ==
Aria hibernica is a very rare plant in Northern Ireland. Fewer than ten sites are known, some with a single tree. One of these locations is on cliffs near Garron Tower, County Antrim. As a result of this rarity, and its endemic status, Aria hibernica is one of the Habitas Priority Species for Northern Ireland. It is also a rare plant in Ireland, with the total population estimated as being in the range 240 to 1,000 individuals. It has a widespread distribution over all of the island, but only as scattered individual trees or small clumps. The population appears to be stable, but with such a small total population, the tree is sensitive to habitat loss. It is cultivated in 12 ex situ conservation collections in botanic gardens.
