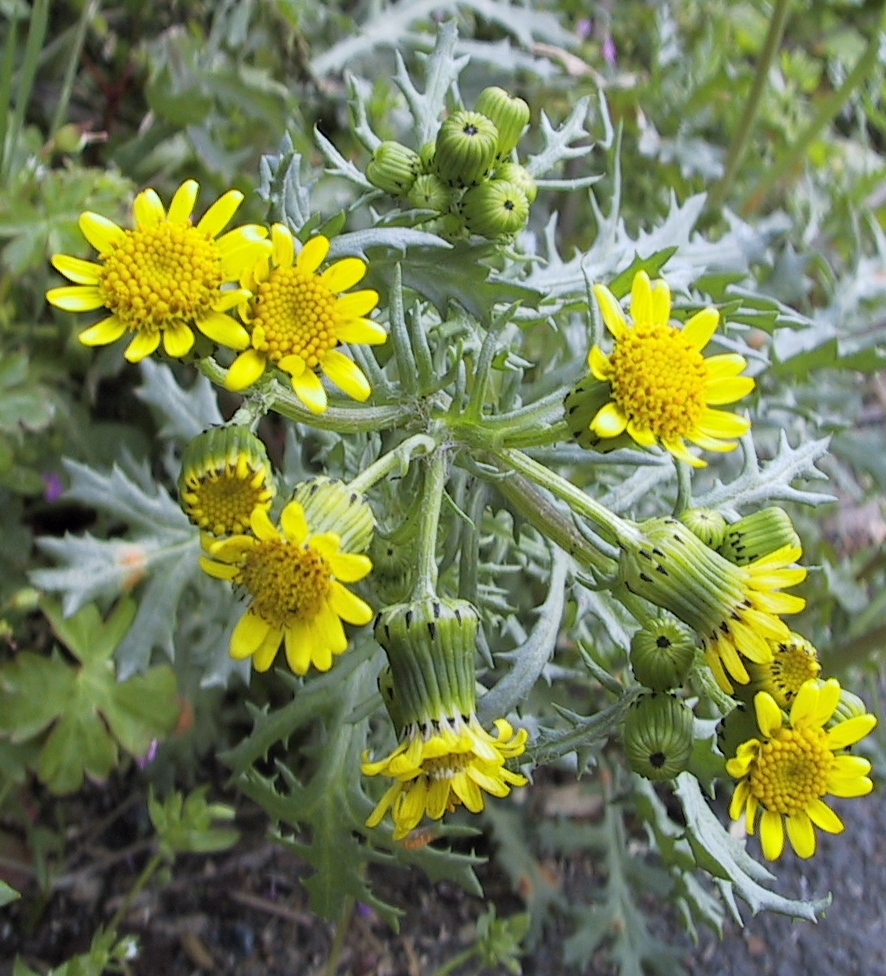

Conservation status
- Near Threatened (IUCN 3.1)

Scientific classification
- Kingdom: Plantae
- Clade: Tracheophytes
- Clade: Angiosperms
- Clade: Eudicots
- Clade: Asterids
- Order: Asterales
- Family: Asteraceae
- Genus: Senecio
- Species: S. cambrensis

Binomial name
- Senecio cambrensis Rosser

= Senecio cambrensis =

Species of flowering plant

Senecio cambrensis, the Welsh groundsel or Welsh ragwort, is a flowering plant of the family Asteraceae. It is endemic to Great Britain and currently known only from North Wales. It is a recently evolved plant that arose as a result of hybridization between two related species.

== Discovery ==
It was first noticed in 1948 by Horace E. Green at Ffrith in Flintshire, north-east Wales.

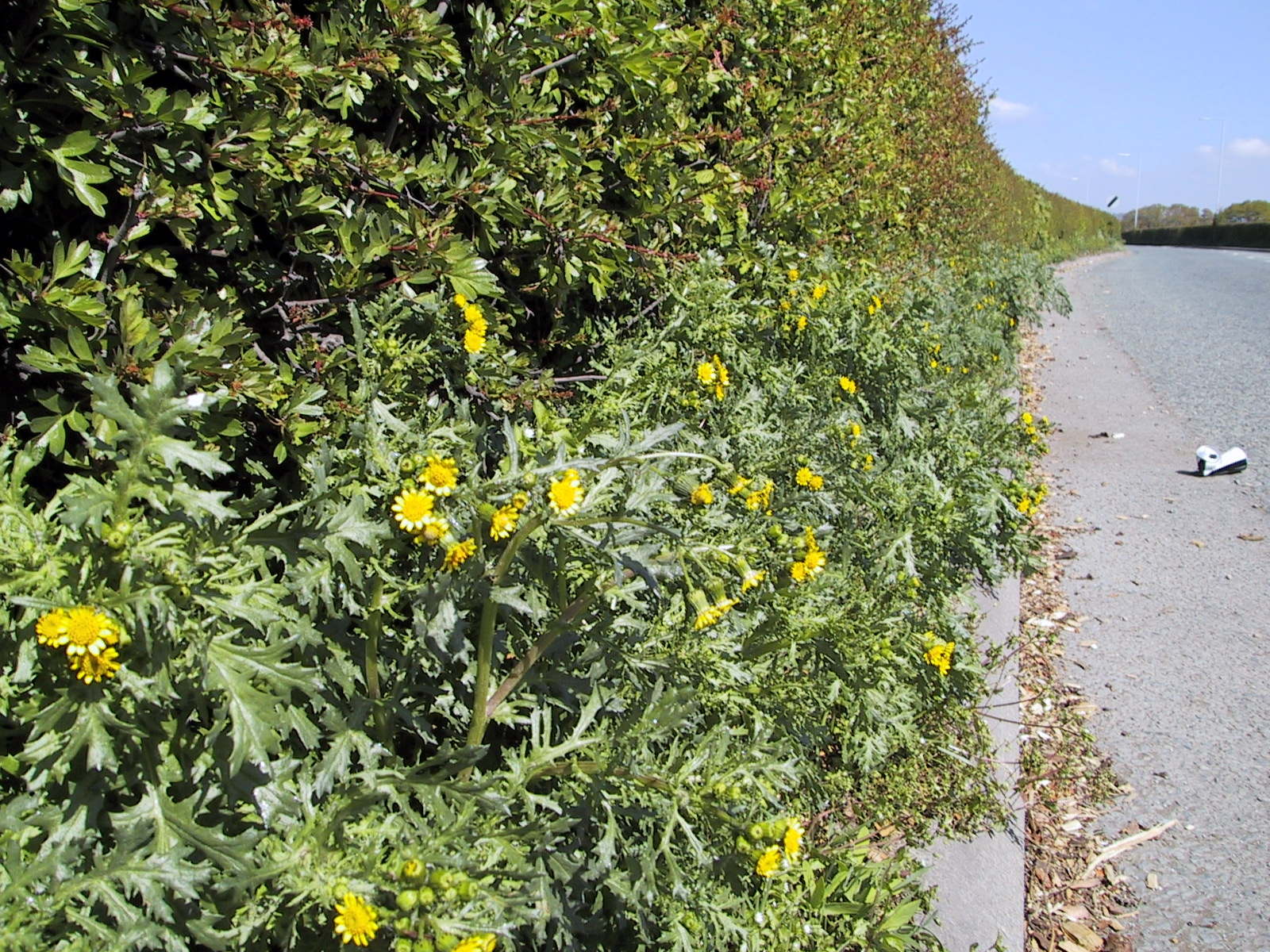
Welsh groundsel lining the roadside at Chirk

The species was described in 1955 by Effie M. Rosser of Manchester Museum using material from the site. It later turned up at a number of sites across the north-east of Wales including Chirk, Brymbo, Queensferry and Colwyn Bay and a herbarium specimen was discovered that had been collected at Brynteg in 1925.

== Origin ==
Welsh groundsel is an allopolyploid, a plant that contains sets of chromosomes originating from two different species. Its ancestor was Senecio × baxteri, an infertile hybrid that can arise spontaneously when the closely related groundsel (Senecio vulgaris) and Oxford ragwort (Senecio squalidus) grow alongside each other. Sometime in the early 20th century, an accidental doubling of the number of chromosomes in an S. × baxteri plant led to the formation of a new fertile species, Welsh groundsel.

Groundsel has a chromosome number 2n = 40; Oxford ragwort 2n = 20; and Welsh groundsel 2n = 60.

== Identification ==
It is intermediate in appearance between the parents. It is an erect annual plant that reaches a height of 30 (sometimes 50) cm. The stem and leaves have few or no hairs. The leaves are deeply lobed. The lower leaves have stalks, whereas the upper leaves are attached directly to the stem. The flower heads are cylindrical and usually have 8 to 15 yellow ray florets ("petals") although some are rayless. The ray florets vary in length but are most commonly 4 to 7 mm long. The pollen grains are 30 to 36 micrometres across and usually have 4 pores.

== Distribution ==
Outside Wales, it was erroneously reported from Shropshire in 1970 and introduced into a school garden in Wolverhampton in the 1990s, where it did not survive.

However, in 1982, Welsh groundsel was discovered at several sites around Edinburgh, Scotland. This population arose independently from the Welsh population; it is believed to date from at least 1974 but now appears to have disappeared with no records since 1993.

== Habitat ==
Typical habitats of the species include waste ground, roadsides and cracks in walls and pavements. The population fluctuates considerably from year to year, but overall appears to be declining. Threats include spraying to kill weeds, road widening, and infection by the rust Puccinia lagenophorae Cooke, 1884, which can decimate large stands.
