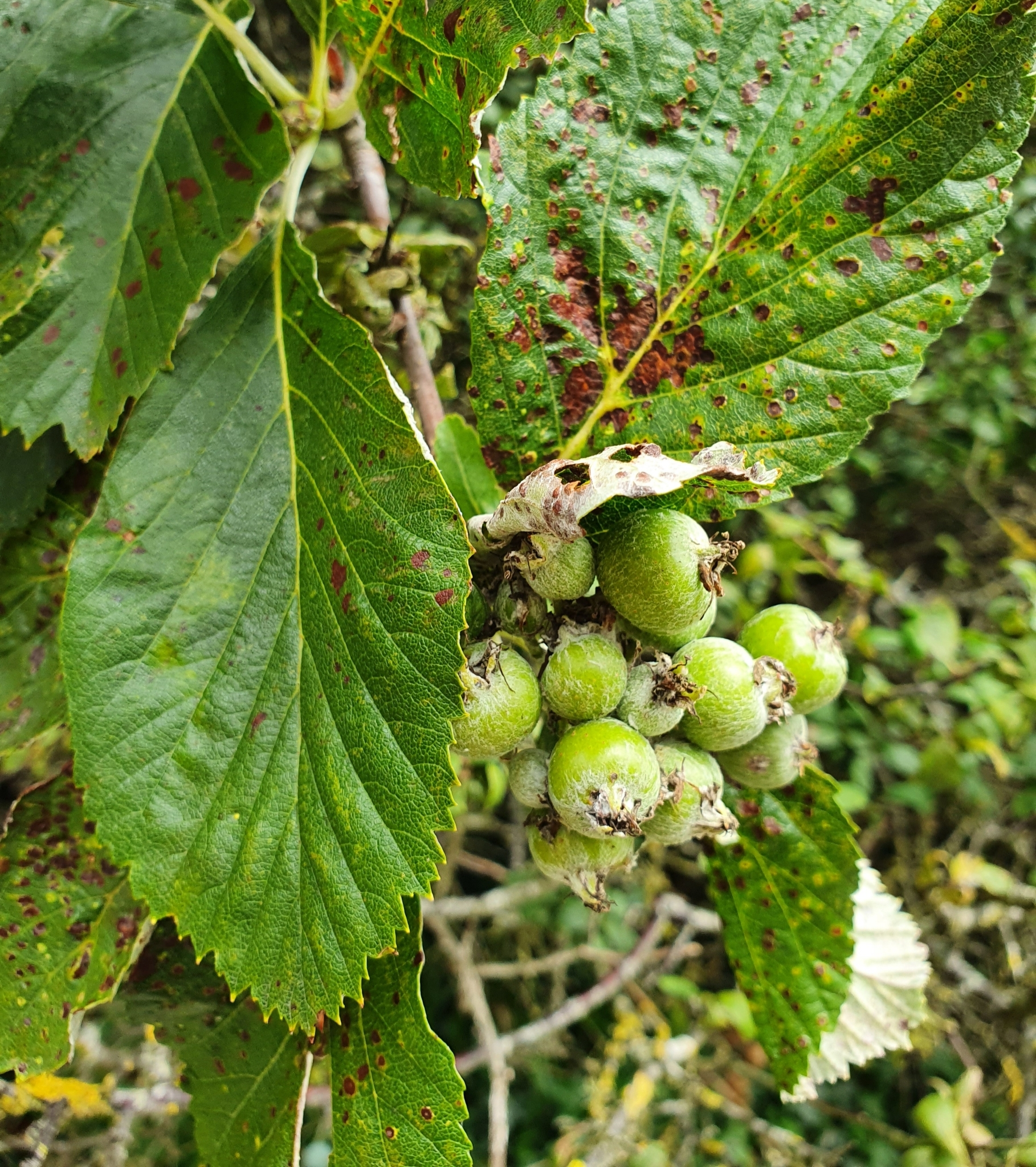

Conservation status
- Least Concern (IUCN 3.1)

Scientific classification
- Kingdom: Plantae
- Clade: Embryophytes
- Clade: Tracheophytes
- Clade: Spermatophytes
- Clade: Angiosperms
- Clade: Eudicots
- Clade: Rosids
- Order: Rosales
- Family: Rosaceae
- Genus: Aria
- Species: A. lancastriensis

Binomial name
- Aria lancastriensis (E.F.Warb.) Sennikov & Kurtto

Synonyms
- Pyrus lancastriensis (E.F.Warb.) M.F.Fay & Christenh.; Sorbus lancastriensis E.F.Warb.

= Aria lancastriensis =

Species of flowering plant

Aria lancastriensis, commonly known as the Lancashire whitebeam, is a species of deciduous tree or shrub in the family Rosaceae, growing to 6 m (20 ft). It is endemic to England, and is found within a 30 km (19 mi) radius from Morecambe Bay, in Lancashire. It is threatened by habitat loss. It has oval leaves. White blossom in spring is followed by orange to red berries in autumn.
