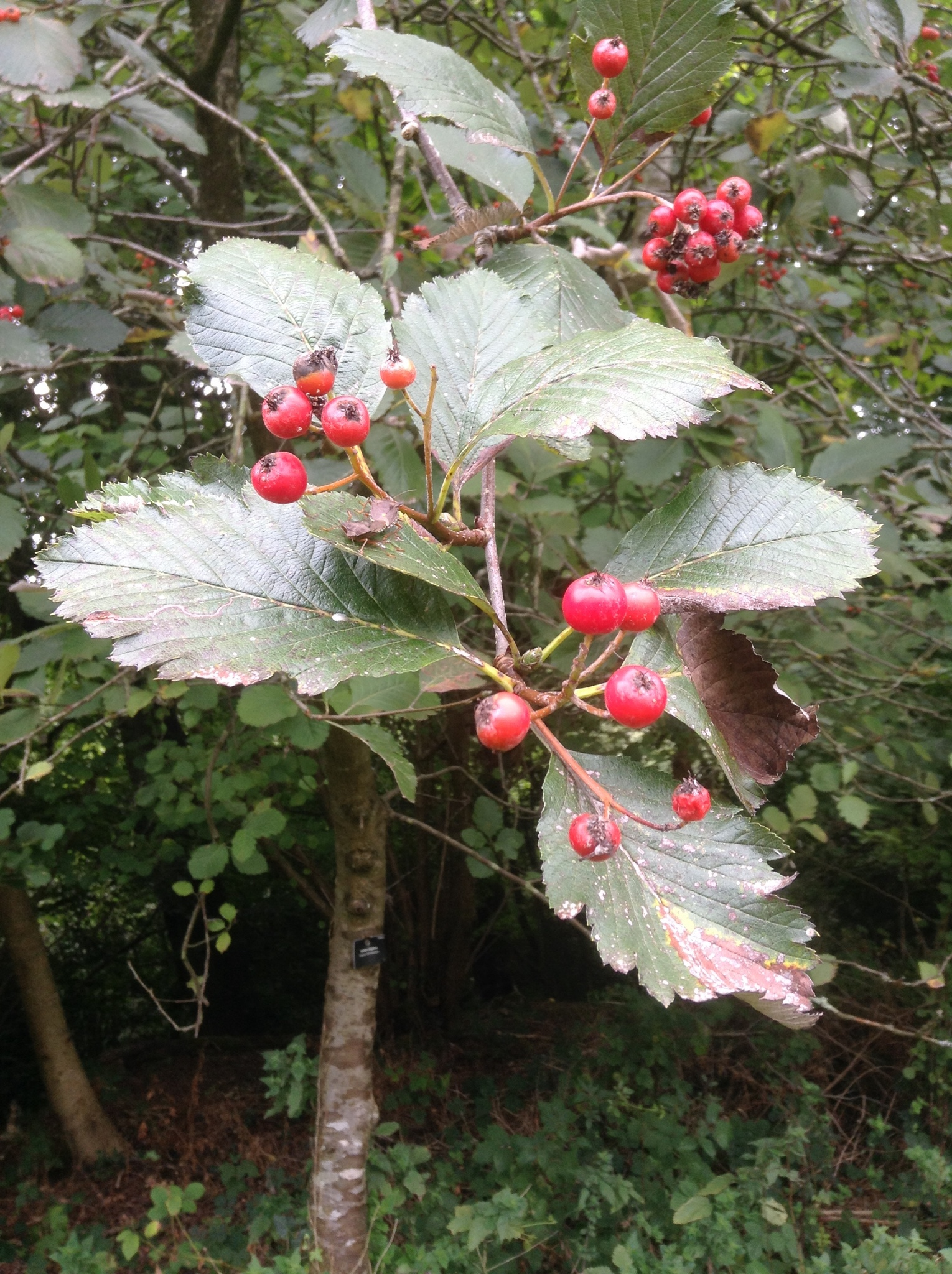

Conservation status
- Near Threatened (IUCN 3.1)

Scientific classification
- Kingdom: Plantae
- Clade: Embryophytes
- Clade: Tracheophytes
- Clade: Angiosperms
- Clade: Eudicots
- Clade: Rosids
- Order: Rosales
- Family: Rosaceae
- Genus: Hedlundia
- Species: H. anglica

Binomial name
- Hedlundia anglica (Hedl.) Sennikov & Kurtto

Synonyms
- List: Pyrus britannica M.F.Fay & Christenh.; Sorbus anglica Hedl.; Sorbus mougeotii var. anglica (Hedl.) C.E.Salmon; Sorbus waltersii P.D.Sell

= Hedlundia anglica =

Species of whitebeam, the English whitebeam

Hedlundia anglica, formerly Sorbus anglica, the English whitebeam, is a species of whitebeam tree in the family Rosaceae. It is endemic to Ireland and the United Kingdom, with an entire British population estimated at 600 individuals.

== Description ==
Hedlundia anglica grows as a small tree or shrub, often with multiple stems. The leaves are broader than most other related species, with lobes whose bases are incised up to one third of the way to the midrib.

== Distribution ==
Hedlundia anglica is found in several widely scattered sites in southwestern England, Wales, and around Killarney in southwestern Ireland.

== Ecology and evolution ==
Hedlundia anglica is usually found growing on cliffs, quarries and rocky hillsides. It appears to be indifferent to soil pH. Occasional specimens are known from oak woodland. Research suggests Hedlundia anglica arose from a cross between Aria porrigentiformis and Sorbus aucuparia.

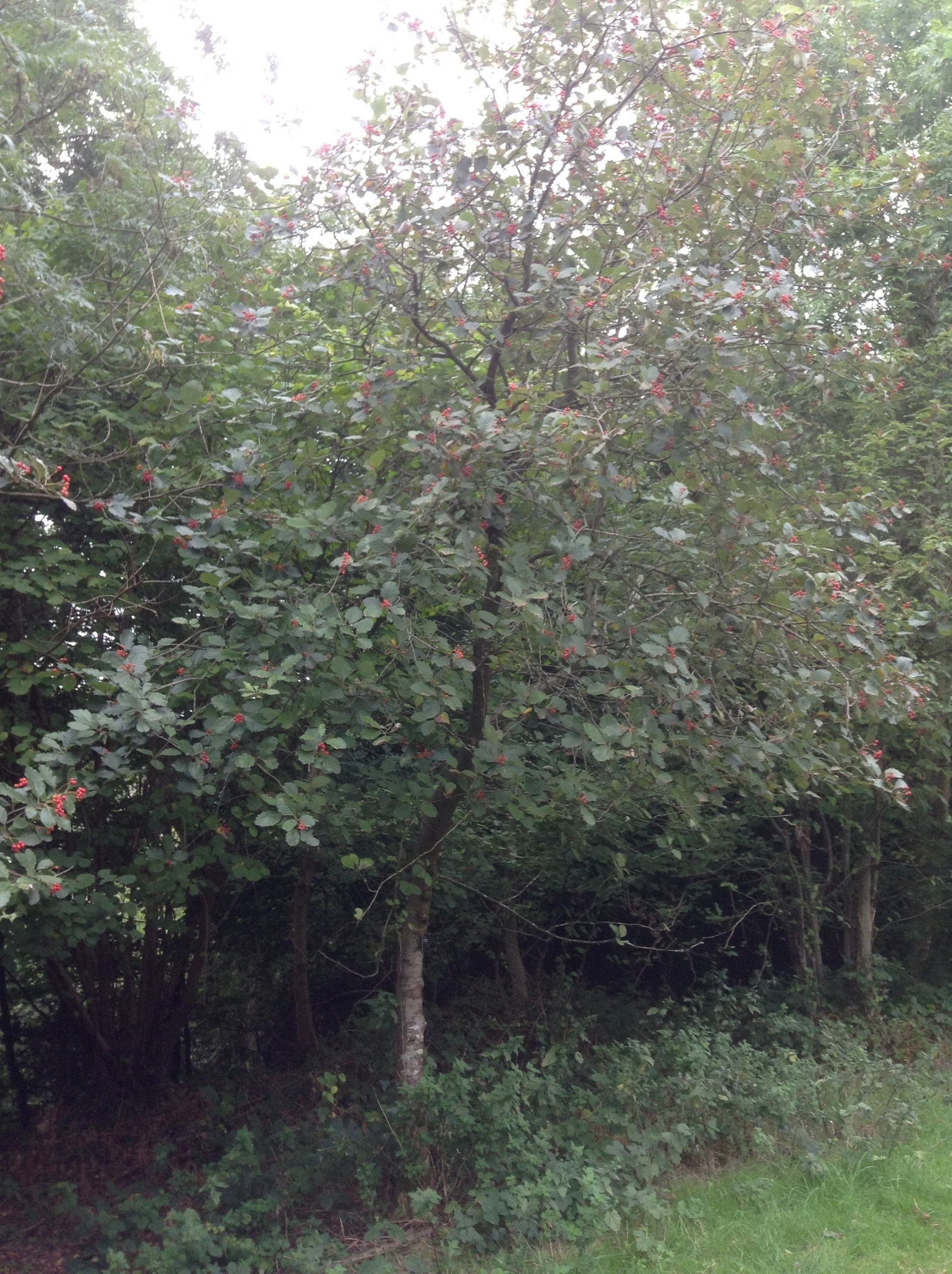
Full tree.

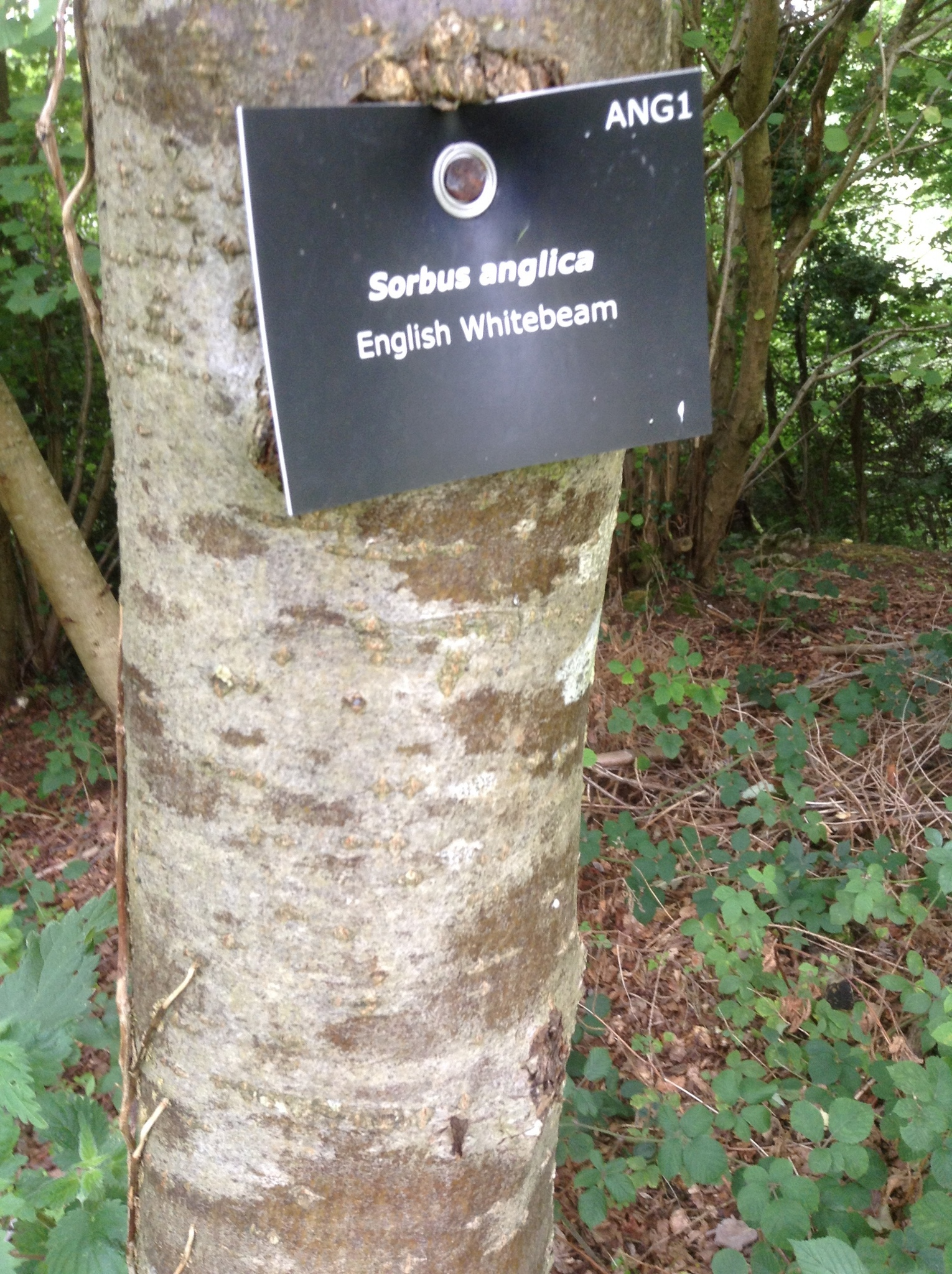
Trunk.
