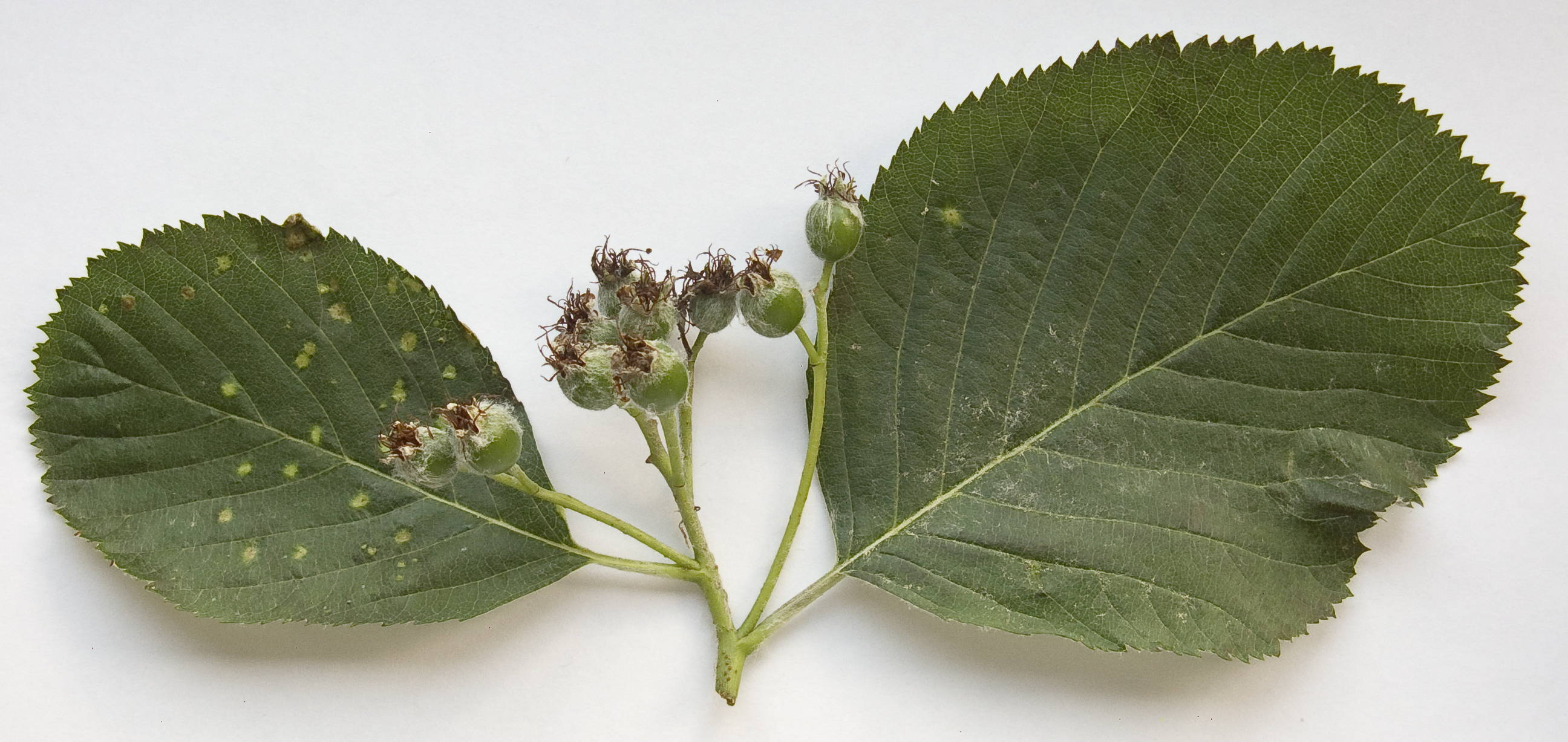
- Leaves and unripe fruit from a small tree in Sutton Park, England

Conservation status
- Vulnerable (IUCN 3.1)

Scientific classification
- Kingdom: Plantae
- Clade: Embryophytes
- Clade: Tracheophytes
- Clade: Spermatophytes
- Clade: Angiosperms
- Clade: Eudicots
- Clade: Rosids
- Order: Rosales
- Family: Rosaceae
- Genus: Aria
- Species: A. eminens

Binomial name
- Aria eminens (E.F.Warb.) Sennikov & Kurtto

Synonyms
- Pyrus eminens (E.F.Warb.) M.F.Fay & Christenh.; Sorbus eminens E.F.Warb.; Sorbus subeminens P.D.Sell

= Aria eminens =

Species of flowering plant

Aria eminens, commonly known as the round-leaved whitebeam, is a species of plant in the family Rosaceae. It is endemic to Great Britain and is threatened by habitat loss.

== Description ==
Aria eminens is broadly similar to Aria edulis. It is a shrub or small tree up to 10 m (33 ft) tall. The undersides of the leaves are greyish-white due to the many hairs. The leaves are more or less round, usually with a length 1–1.3 times the width, rarely up to 1.5 times as long as wide; they usually have 9–11 veins on either side. The leaf margins usually have a single series of teeth ("uniserrate") although there can be evidence of a second series ("biserrate"). The fruits have many lenticels, small and large, mainly towards the base.

== Distribution and habitat ==
Aria eminens is endemic to parts of south-west England and south Wales. It is considered to be native to calciferous woodland in north Somerset, west Gloucestershire, Herefordshire and Monmouthshire. It has also been recorded in Sutton Park, Birmingham, well outside its expected range, where it is assumed to have been planted originally.

== Evolution ==
A. eminens is a tetraploid, resulting from hybridisation between Aria edulis and Aria porrigentiformis.
