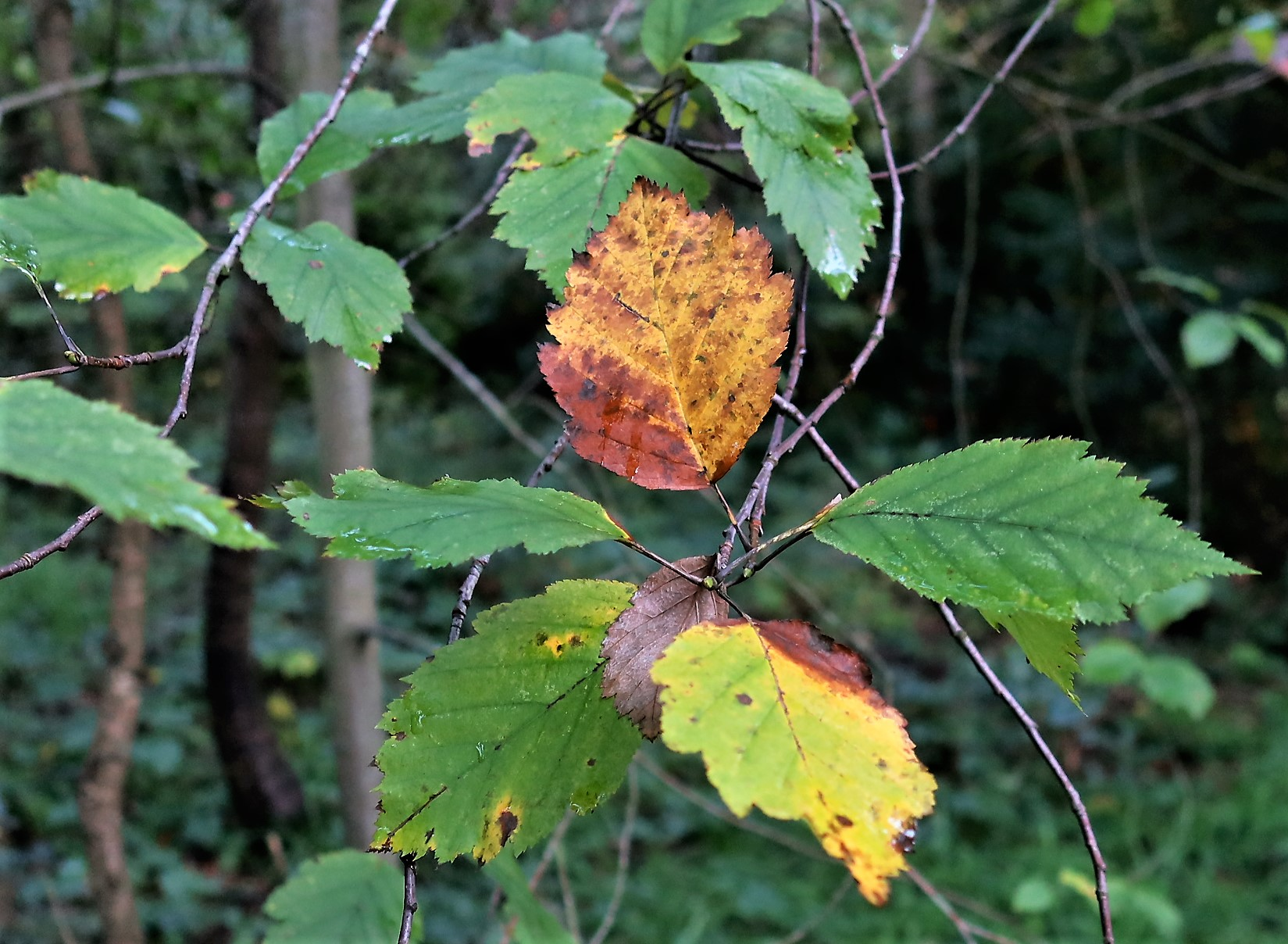

Conservation status
- Endangered (IUCN 3.1)

Scientific classification
- Kingdom: Plantae
- Clade: Tracheophytes
- Clade: Angiosperms
- Clade: Eudicots
- Clade: Rosids
- Order: Rosales
- Family: Rosaceae
- Genus: Aria
- Species: A. subcuneata

Binomial name
- Aria subcuneata (Wilmott) Mosyakin, Fedor. & McNeill

Synonyms
- Karpatiosorbus subcuneata (Wilmott) Sennikov & Kurtto; Pyrus latifolia var. decipiens Druce; Pyrus rotundifolia var. decipiens N.E.Br.; Pyrus subcuneata (Wilmott) M.F.Fay & Christenh.; Sorbus subcuneata Wilmott

= Aria subcuneata =

Species of flowering plant

Aria subcuneata, the Somerset whitebeam, is a species of plant in the family Rosaceae. It is endemic to coastal north Devon and west Somerset in the United Kingdom. It is threatened by habitat loss.

== Description ==
Aria subcuneata is a small tree, reaching a height of 18 metres (59 ft). Its leaves are on average twice as long as broad. Fruits are distinctive – globose, reddish brown, and covered with silvery lenticels.
