= Aria vexans =

Conservation status
- Critically Endangered (IUCN 3.1)

Scientific classification
- Kingdom: Plantae
- Clade: Embryophytes
- Clade: Tracheophytes
- Clade: Spermatophytes
- Clade: Angiosperms
- Clade: Eudicots
- Clade: Rosids
- Order: Rosales
- Family: Rosaceae
- Genus: Aria
- Species: A. vexans

Binomial name
- Aria vexans (E.F.Warb.) Sennikov & Kurtto

Synonyms
- Pyrus vexans (E.F.Warb.) M.F.Fay & Christenh.; Sorbus vexans E.F.Warb.

Species of tree

Aria vexans, commonly known as bloody whitebeam, is a rare species of tree in the family Rosaceae. It is endemic to England and is found along the coast between Culbone in Somerset and an area just west of Trentishoe in Devon. It can be seen in the Exmoor National Park. It is threatened by habitat loss.

== Description ==
Aria vexans is a small tree or shrub, often with multiple stems. The leaves, greyish-white below like other whitebeams, are narrower than most other species in this genus. The fruits, which develop from September on, are deep red.
