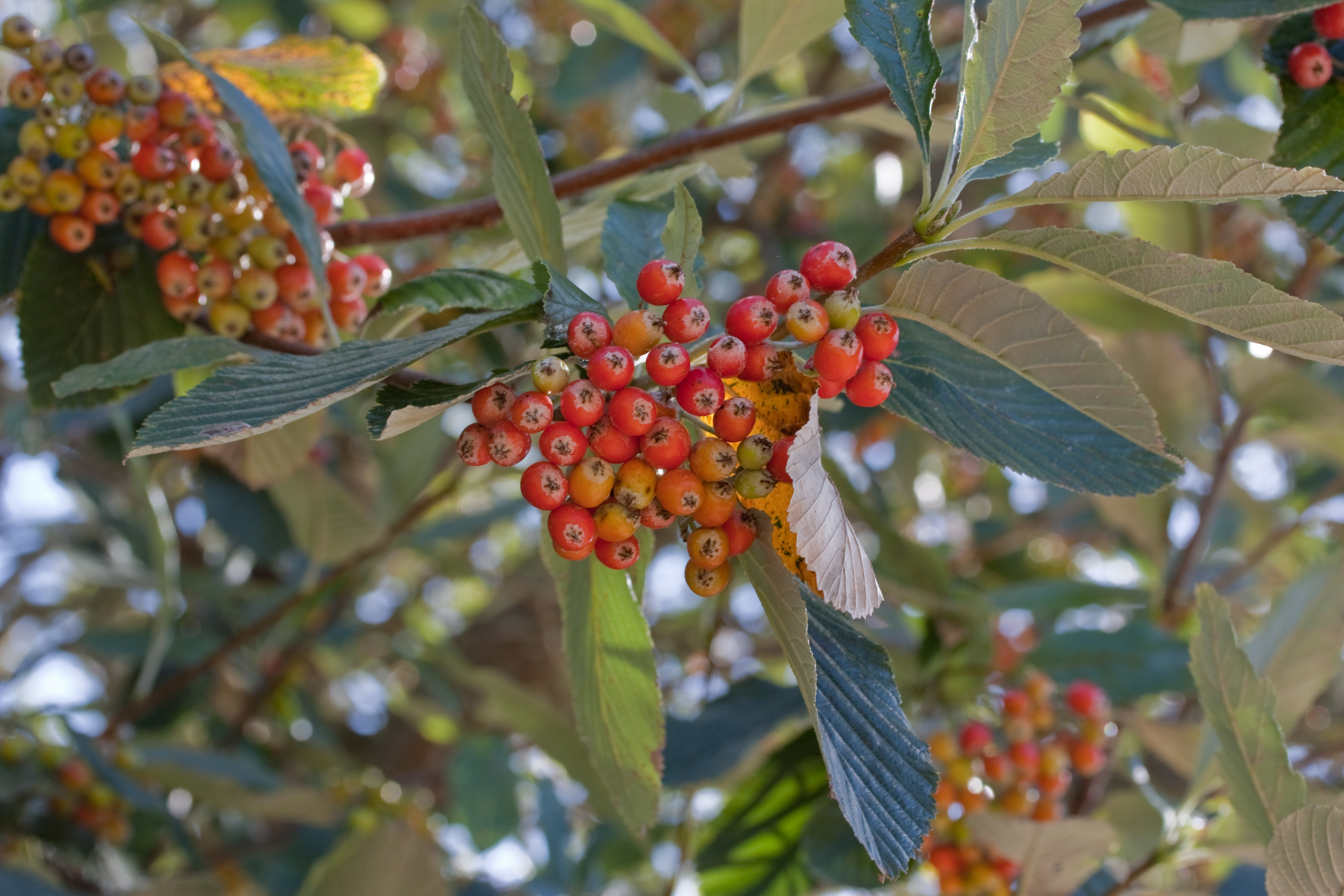

Conservation status
- Least Concern (IUCN 3.1)

Scientific classification
- Kingdom: Plantae
- Clade: Tracheophytes
- Clade: Angiosperms
- Clade: Eudicots
- Clade: Rosids
- Order: Rosales
- Family: Rosaceae
- Genus: Aria
- Species: A. edulis

Binomial name
- Aria edulis (Willd.) M.Roem.
- Distribution map

Synonyms
- List: Aria nivea var. edulis (Willd.) Koehne; Hahnia aria var. edulis (Willd.) Dippel; Pyrus aria proles edulis (Willd.) Asch. & Graebn.; Pyrus edulis Willd.; Sorbus aria subsp. edulis (Willd.) Sved., Alm & Örtendahl; Sorbus aria var. edulis (Willd.) Wenz.; Sorbus edulis (Willd.) K.Koch; Aria alpina M.Roem.; Aria aria (L.) Huth; Aria majestica Lavallée; Aria nivea Host; Aria nivea var. acutifolia (Ser.) M.Roem.; Aria nivea acutifolia (Ser.) Gren.; Aria nivea var. angustifolia (Lindl.) M.Roem.; Aria nivea var. bullata (Lindl.) M.Roem.; Aria nivea f. cyclophylla Beck; Aria nivea var. glabrata (G.Kirchn.) Lavallée; Aria nivea var. incisa (Mutel) M.Roem.; Aria nivea var. lanata Lavallée; Aria nivea var. latifolia Lavallée; Aria nivea latifolia Gren.; Aria nivea var. longifolia (Pers.) Gren.; Aria nivea var. rugosa (Lindl.) M.Roem.; Aria nivea proles tomentosa (Rouy & E.G.Camus) Bonnier; Aria nivea var. undulata (Lindl.) M.Roem.; Aria tomentosa (Rouy & E.G.Camus) Bonnier; Aria vulgaris Decne.; Aronia alpina (M.Roem.) Dippel; × Aroniaria alpina (M.Roem.) Mezhenskyj; Azarolus aria (L.) Borkh.; Chamaemespilus aria (L.) M.Roem.; Crataegus alpina Gray; Crataegus aria L.; Crataegus pallida Salisb.; Hahnia aria (L.) Medik.; Hahnia aria var. angustifolia (Lindl.) Dippel; Hahnia aria f. aurea Hesse ex Dippel; Hahnia aria carpinifolia (J.R.Booth ex G.Kirchn.) Dippel; Hahnia aria glabrata (G.Kirchn.) Dippel; Hahnia aria microphylla Dippel; Hahnia aria vestita Dippel; Lazarolus aria (L.) Borkh.; Malus aria (L.) Risso; Mespilus aria (L.) Scop.; Pyrenia aria (L.) Clairv.; Pyrus alpina Willd.; Pyrus aria (L.) Ehrh.; Pyrus aria var. acutifolia Ser.; Pyrus aria subvar. angustifolia (Lindl.) Asch. & Graebn.; Pyrus aria var. angustifolia Lindl.; Pyrus aria subvar. bellojocensis (Gand.) Asch. & Graebn.; Pyrus aria monstr. bullata (Lindl.) Asch. & Graebn.; Pyrus aria var. bullata Lindl.; Pyrus aria monstr. chrysophylla Asch. & Graebn.; Pyrus aria proles cyclophylla (Beck) Asch. & Graebn.; Pyrus aria elliptica Ten.; Pyrus aria var. incisa (Mutel) Asch. & Graebn.; Pyrus aria var. longifolia (Pers.) Steud.; Pyrus aria var. lutescens G.Nicholson; Pyrus aria monstr. lutescens Asch. & Graebn.; Pyrus aria subvar. parvula (C.K.Schneid.) Asch. & Graebn.; Pyrus aria rosea Tausch; Pyrus aria var. rosea Tausch ex Koehne; Pyrus aria rotundifolia Ten.; Pyrus aria var. rugosa Lindl.; Pyrus aria var. silvestrii Pamp.; Pyrus aria var. sulphurea G.Nicholson; Pyrus aria proles typica Asch. & Graebn.; Pyrus aria var. undulata Lindl.; Pyrus aria' monstr. 'undulata (Lindl.) Asch. & Graebn.; Pyrus carpatica Asch. & Graebn.; Pyrus crenata K.Koch; × Sorbaronia alpina (M.Roem.) C.K.Schneid.; Sorbus acutiloba Gand.; Sorbus alpina Heynh.; Sorbus ararica Gand.; Sorbus aria (L.) Crantz; Sorbus aria f. acutifolia (DC.) Kárpáti; Sorbus aria var. acutifolia (DC.) Jáv.; Sorbus aria proles acutifolia (Ser.) Rouy & E.G.Camus; Sorbus aria var. alnoides Timb.-Lagr.; Sorbus aria var. amplifolia Rouy & E.G.Camus; Sorbus aria f. angustifolia (Lindl.) Buia; Sorbus aria var. angustifolia Lindl.; Sorbus aria var. arioides (Godet) Timb.-Lagr.; Sorbus aria f. aurea (Hesse ex Rehder) Rehder; Sorbus aria var. aurea Hesse ex Rehder; Sorbus aria f. bullata (Lindl.) Buia; Sorbus aria var. canescens Legrand; Sorbus aria var. carpatica Soó; Sorbus aria var. carpinifolia J.R.Booth ex G.Kirchn.; Sorbus aria subsp. carpinifolia (J.R.Booth ex G.Kirchn.) Hedl.; Sorbus aria f. carpinifolia (J.R.Booth ex G.Kirchn.) Kovanda; Sorbus aria f. chrysophylla Hesse; Sorbus aria var. cinerea Timb.-Lagr.; Sorbus aria var. concolor Albov; Sorbus aria var. cyclophylla (Beck) C.K.Schneid.; Sorbus aria subsp. cyclophylla (Beck) Soó; Sorbus aria f. cyclophylla (Beck) Jáv.; Sorbus aria var. denticulata Waisb.; Sorbus aria var. detrusa Hedl. ex Issler; Sorbus aria var. ellipticifolia Timb.-Lagr.; Sorbus aria subsp. euaria Hayek; Sorbus aria var. glabra Albov; Sorbus aria glabrata W.D.J.Koch ex S.Schauer; Sorbus aria grandifolia K.Koch; Sorbus aria f. incisa (Mutel) Jáv.; Sorbus aria var. incisa Albov; Sorbus aria var. incisa Mutel; Sorbus aria subsp. incisa (Mutel) Hedl.; Sorbus aria var. kamaonensis Wall. ex Maxim.; Sorbus aria var. lachnophylla Murr; Sorbus aria var. lanifera A.Kern. ex Borbás; Sorbus aria subsp. lanifera (A.Kern. ex Borbás) Jáv.; Sorbus aria var. latifolia (Gren.) Kárpáti; Sorbus aria subsp. longifolia (Pers.) Hedl.; Sorbus aria f. longifolia (Pers.) Rehder; Sorbus aria var. longifolia Pers.; Sorbus aria f. lutescens (Hartwig) Zabel; Sorbus aria var. lutescens Hartwig; Sorbus aria f. macrocarpa Konovalov; Sorbus aria f. magnifica Hesse; Sorbus aria f. matrensis Soó; Sorbus aria var. microphylla Timb.-Lagr.; Sorbus aria f. obtusa Kárpáti; Sorbus aria var. obtusata Gren.; Sorbus aria obtusata Gren.; Sorbus aria var. ovoidea Chabert; Sorbus aria f. parvula C.K.Schneid.; Sorbus aria f. pendula Konovalov; Sorbus aria f. pseudocretica Soó; Sorbus aria var. pseudomougeotii Issler; Sorbus aria f. rotundata Düll; Sorbus aria var. sphaerica Chabert; Sorbus aria var. tomentosa (Rouy & E.G.Camus) P.Fourn.; Sorbus aria subsp. tomentosa Rouy & E.G.Camus; Sorbus aria var. typica C.K.Schneid.; Sorbus arioides (Godet) Michalet; Sorbus arvernensis Gand.; Sorbus austriaca subsp. serpentini Kárpáti; Sorbus bellojocensis Gand.; Sorbus budaiana Kárpáti; Sorbus carpatica (Soó) Kárpáti; Sorbus carpinifolia (J.R.Booth ex G.Kirchn.) Prain; Sorbus chamaemespilus var. arioides Godet; Sorbus controversa Gand.; Sorbus glabrata G.Kirchn.; Sorbus globulifera Hedl. ex Ridd.; Sorbus huljakii Kárpáti; Sorbus incisa (Mutel) Prain; Sorbus longifolia (Pers.) Prain; Sorbus oblonga Gand.; Sorbus pallidifolia Gand.; Sorbus reverchonii Gand.; Sorbus scandica subsp. arioides (Godet) Nyman; Sorbus sphaerocarpa Gand.; Sorbus tomentosa (Rouy & E.G.Camus) Issler; Sorbus turbinata Gand.

= Aria edulis =

Species of tree

Aria edulis, the whitebeam or common whitebeam, is a species of deciduous tree in the family Rosaceae.

== Description ==
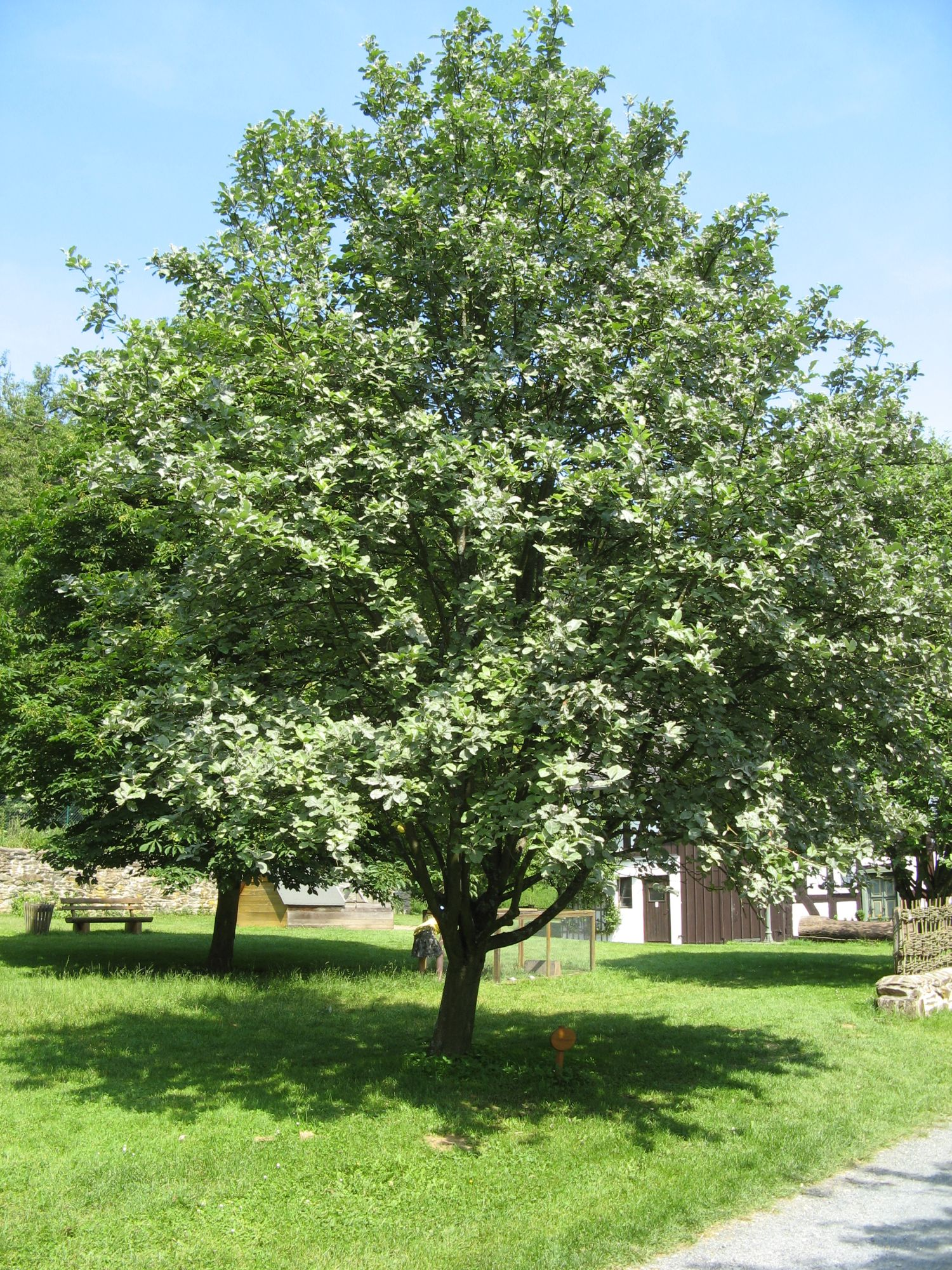
Aria edulis tree

The tree often forms new shoots around the trunk. Typically compact and domed, the plant has a few upswept branches and the leaves have an almost-white underside. The hermaphrodite cream-white flowers appear in May, are insect pollinated, and go on to produce scarlet berries, which are often eaten by birds.

== Distribution and habitat ==
It is native to most of Europe as well as North Africa (Algeria, Morocco, Tunisia) and temperate Asia (Eastern Turkey, Armenia, Georgia). It generally favours dry limestone and chalk soils.

== Uses ==
The berries are edible when overripe (bletted).

The cultivars A. edulis 'Lutescens', with very whitish-green early leaves, and A. edulis 'Majestica', with large leaves, have both gained the Royal Horticultural Society's Award of Garden Merit.
