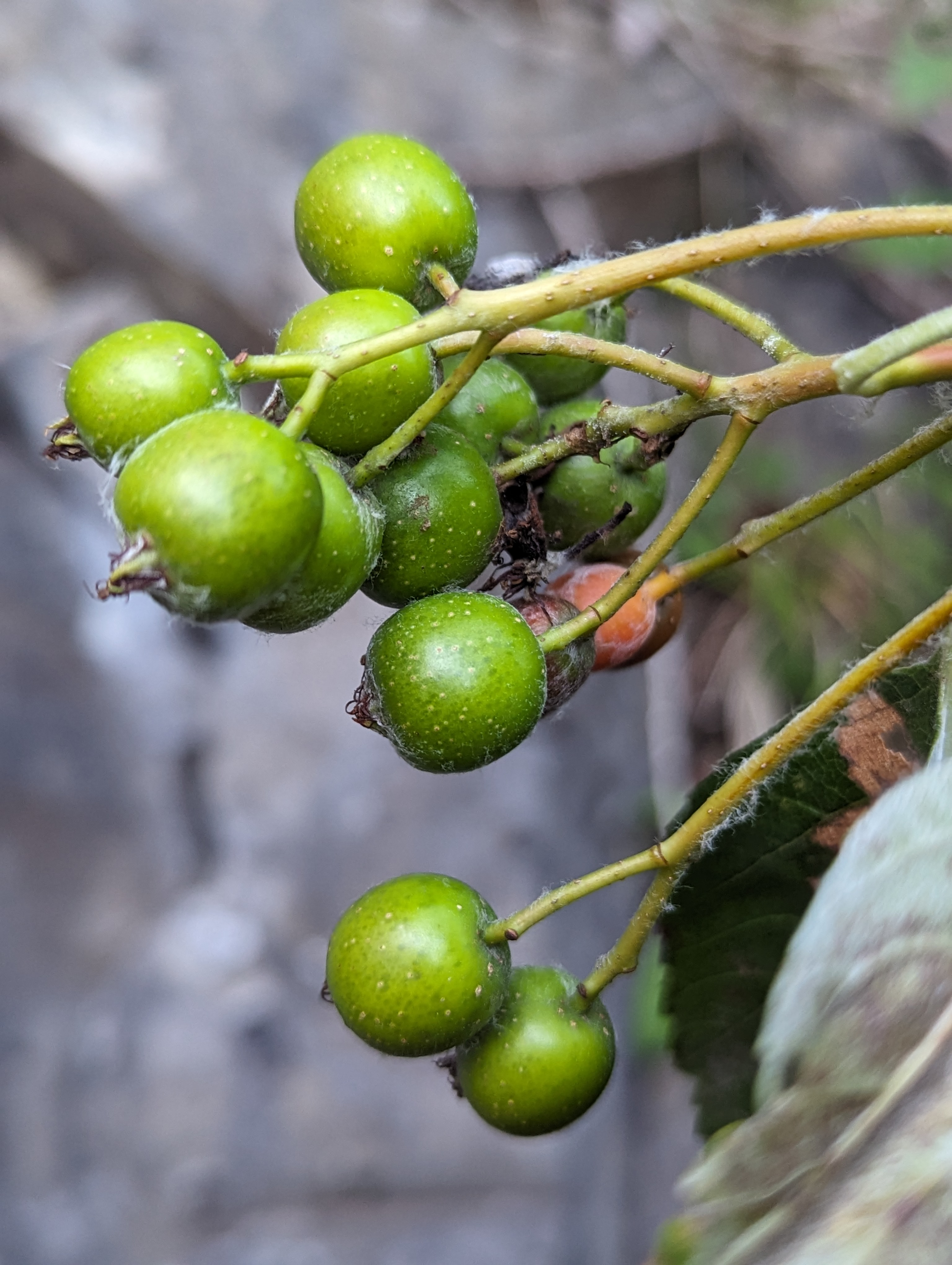

Conservation status
- Vulnerable (IUCN 3.1)

Scientific classification
- Kingdom: Plantae
- Clade: Embryophytes
- Clade: Tracheophytes
- Clade: Spermatophytes
- Clade: Angiosperms
- Clade: Eudicots
- Clade: Rosids
- Order: Rosales
- Family: Rosaceae
- Genus: Aria
- Species: A. porrigentiformis

Binomial name
- Aria porrigentiformis (E.F.Warb.) Sennikov & Kurtto

Synonyms
- Pyrus porrigentiformis (E.F.Warb.) M.F.Fay & Christenh.; Sorbus porrigentiformis E.F.Warb.; Sorbus humphreyana P.D.Sell

= Aria porrigentiformis =

Species of flowering plant

Aria porrigentiformis, commonly known as the grey-leafed whitebeam, is a species of whitebeam endemic to England and Wales.

== Description ==
This species grows as a shrub or small tree, growing to a height of about 5m. It has obovate leaves; these are shiny green above, and as with all whitebeams, are whitish below. Flowers are white, while the fruits are red globose berries ca.1cm across, usually dappled with pale lenticels.

== Distribution and habitat ==
Aria porrigentiformis is a light demanding species, growing in abandoned quarries, scrubby hills, and grassland on shallow, usually calcareous soils. Populations are restricted to South Wales, Devon and Somerset, and there are fewer than one thousand individuals in total.
