= Hedlundia harziana =

Conservation status
- Critically Endangered (IUCN 3.1)

Scientific classification
- Kingdom: Plantae
- Clade: Tracheophytes
- Clade: Angiosperms
- Clade: Eudicots
- Clade: Rosids
- Order: Rosales
- Family: Rosaceae
- Genus: Hedlundia
- Species: H. harziana

Binomial name
- Hedlundia harziana (N.Mey.) Sennikov & Kurtto
- It is endemic to Bavaria, Germany

Synonyms
- Pyrus harziana (N.Mey.) M.F.Fay & Christenh.; Sorbus harziana N.Mey.

Species of tree

Hedlundia harziana, or Harz's whitebeam, is an apomictic species of tree endemic to Bavaria, Germany. It is extremely rare and threatened with extinction. It arose via hybridisation of Aria edulis with Sorbus aucuparia after the last ice age.

== Description ==
=== Vegetative characteristics ===
Hedlundia harziana is an up to 8 m tall tree or shrub. The leaves of the short twigs are slightly lobed. The lobes have an obtuse apex. The more deeply lobed leaves of the long twigs have 10–12 pairs of lateral veins. The leaf base is acute or cuneate. The abaxial leaf surface is pubescent with greyish green hairs.

=== Generative characteristics ===
The stamens are longer than the styles. The flower has three styles. The bright red, ovoid, 1 cm big fruit bears few lenticels.

== Taxonomy ==
It was first described as Sorbus harziana N.Mey. by Norbert Meyer in 2005. It was moved to the genus Hedlundia Sennikov & Kurtto as Hedlundia harziana (N.Mey.) Sennikov & Kurtto by Alexander Nikolaevitsch Sennikov and Arto Kurtto in 2017. The type specimen was collected by N. Meyer and O. Angerer in Bavaria, Germany on the 19 May 2001.

=== Etymology ===
The specific epithet harziana honours the German botanist Carl Otto Harz.

== Distribution and habitat ==
It is endemic to Bavaria, Germany, where it occurs in a small area of only 1.7 km^{2} in open pine forest, on the edges of deciduous forest, and on rocks at an elevation of 450 m above sea level.

== Conservation ==
It is a critically endangered species with a small population of only 30 mature trees. It doesn't have special legal protection. It is cultivated on the ex situ conservation collections of the Botanical Garden Erlangen, of the Botanischer Garten der Universität Regensburg, and in the private collection of Karsten Horn.
