= Hedlundia schwarziana =

- Hedlundia schwarziana growing in the Franconian Jura, Germany

Conservation status
- Critically Endangered (IUCN 3.1)

Scientific classification
- Kingdom: Plantae
- Clade: Tracheophytes
- Clade: Angiosperms
- Clade: Eudicots
- Clade: Rosids
- Order: Rosales
- Family: Rosaceae
- Genus: Hedlundia
- Species: H. schwarziana

Binomial name
- Hedlundia schwarziana (N.Mey.) Sennikov & Kurtto
- It is endemic to Bavaria, Germany

Synonyms
- Pyrus schwarziana (N.Mey.) M.F.Fay & Christenh.; Sorbus schwarziana N.Mey.

Species of tree

Hedlundia schwarziana, or Schwarz's whitebeam, is an apomictic species of tree in the family Rosaceae endemic to Bavaria, Germany. It is extremely rare and threatened with extinction.

== Description ==
Hedlundia schwarziana growing on the forest edge in the Franconian Jura, Germany

Lower leaf surface of Hedlundia schwarziana foliage

=== Vegetative characteristics ===
Hedlundia schwarziana is an up to 4–7 m tall shrub or tree. The leaves have 9–11 pairs of lateral veins. The abaxial leaf surface is pubescent with greyish green hairs.

=== Generative characteristics ===
The flowers have 2–3 styles. The red, ovoid, 1 cm long fruit bears very small, scattered lenticels.

=== Cytology ===
The chromosome count is 2n = 3x = 51. It is triploid.

== Taxonomy ==
It was first described as Sorbus schwarziana N.Mey. by Norbert Meyer in 2005. It was moved to the genus Hedlundia Sennikov & Kurtto as Hedlundia schwarziana (N.Mey.) Sennikov & Kurtto by Alexander Nikolaevitsch Sennikov and Arto Kurtto in 2017. The type specimen was collected on the 1st of July 2001 by N. Meyer and O. Angerer on a rock hill in grasslands southwest of Frechetsfeld, Bavaria, Germany.

=== Etymology ===
The specific epithet schwarziana honours the German botanist Otto Karl Anton Schwarz.

== Distribution and habitat ==
Hedlundia schwarziana is endemic to Bavaria in Germany, where it occurs in a small area of only 1 km^{2} on the edges of deciduous forest at elevations of 500–600 m above sea level.

== Conservation ==
It is a critically endangered species with a small population of fewer than ten known mature trees restricted to a very small area. Hedlundia schwarziana is cultivated in ex situ conservation collections in botanic gardens, such as the Botanischer Garten der Universität Erlangen and the Botanischer Garten der Universität Regensburg.
