= Hedlundia hohenesteri =

- Fruiting Hedlundia hohenesteri in the Franconian Jura

Conservation status
- Critically Endangered (IUCN 3.1)

Scientific classification
- Kingdom: Plantae
- Clade: Tracheophytes
- Clade: Angiosperms
- Clade: Eudicots
- Clade: Rosids
- Order: Rosales
- Family: Rosaceae
- Genus: Hedlundia
- Species: H. hohenesteri

Binomial name
- Hedlundia hohenesteri (N.Mey.) Sennikov & Kurtto
- It is endemic to Bavaria, Germany

Synonyms
- Pyrus hohenesteri (N.Mey.) M.F.Fay & Christenh.; Sorbus hohenesteri N.Mey.

Species of tree

Hedlundia hohenesteri, the Hohenester's whitebeam, is an apomictic species of tree in the family Rosaceae endemic to Bavaria, Germany. It is extremely rare and threatened with extinction.

== Description ==
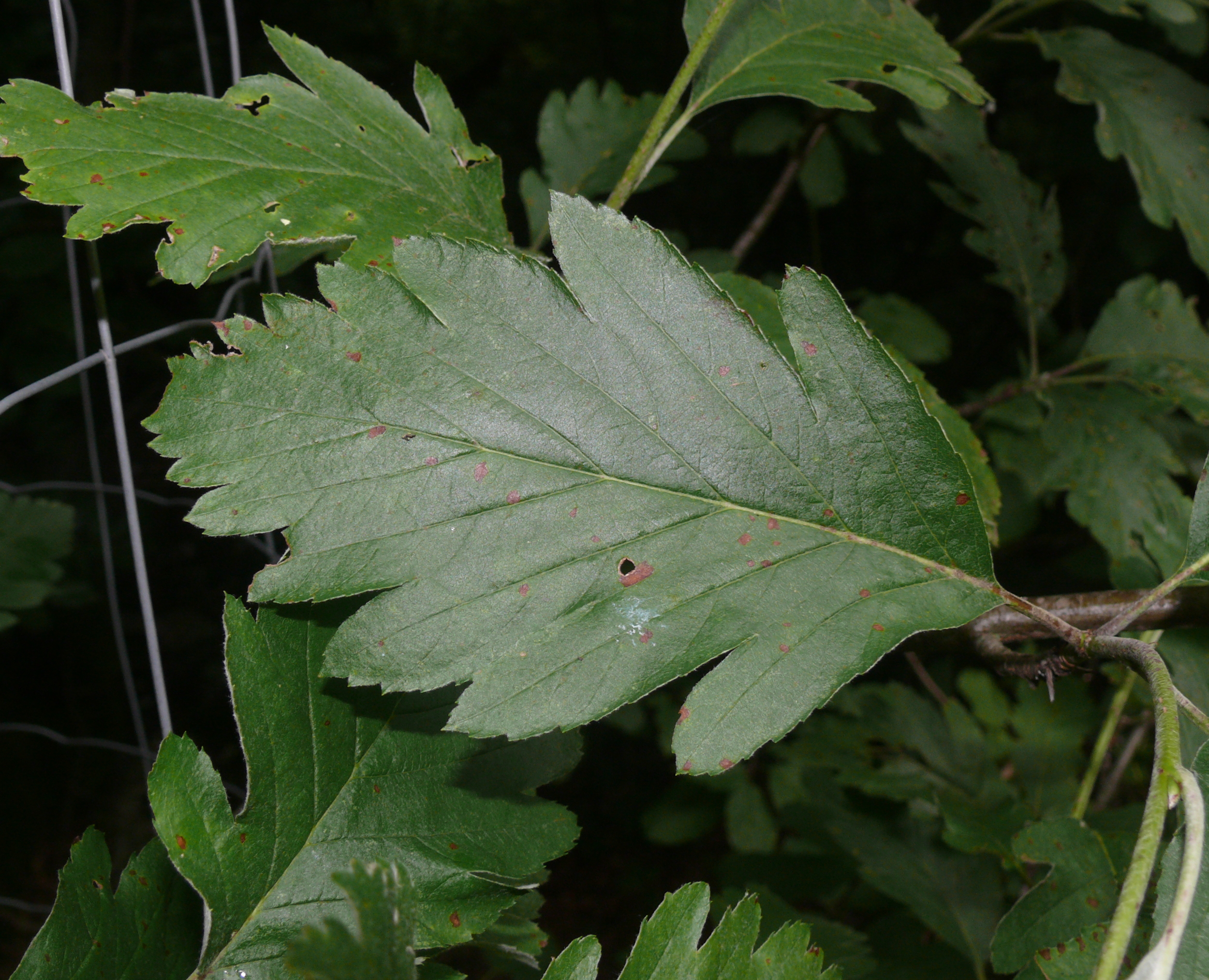
Hedlundia hohenesteri leaf

Pubescent underside of Hedlundia hohenesteri foliage

=== Vegetative characteristics ===
Hedlundia hohenesteri is a small, deciduous, calcicolous, heliophilous, mostly multi-trunked, 1–5m tall tree with elongate to ovate, lobed leaves with 6–9 pairs of lateral veins. Some of the leaf lobes have an acute apex. The leaf lobes never reach the midrib. The adaxial leaf surface is glabrous and glossy. The abaxial leaf surface is pubescent with greyish green hairs.

=== Generative characteristics ===
The ovoid, 1 cm big fruit bears few to no lenticels.

=== Cytology ===
The chromosome count is 2n = 3x = 51. It is triploid.

== Taxonomy ==
It was first described as Sorbus hohenesteri N.Mey. by Norbert Meyer in 2005. It was moved to the genus Hedlundia Sennikov & Kurtto as Hedlundia hohenesteri (N.Mey.) Sennikov & Kurtto by Alexander Nikolaevitsch Sennikov and Arto Kurtto in 2017. It was discovered in 1992.

=== Etymology ===
The specific epithet hohenesteri honours the German botanist Adalbert Hohenester.

== Distribution and habitat ==
It is endemic to a single area of only 4 km^{2} near Leutenbach in Bavaria, Germany, where it occurs on rock ledges at an elevation of 480 m above sea level.

== Conservation ==
Hedlundia hohenesteri outgrowing its fence that protects it against grazing animals

Hedlundia hohenesteri is a critically endangered species with a small population of only 10 mature trees. Fences have been erected to protect Hedlundia hohenesteri against grazing animals. It doesn't have special legal protections. It is cultivated in the ex situ conservation collections of the Botanical Garden Erlangen, in the Nuremberg Zoo, and in the Botanischer Garten der Universität Regensburg.
