= Aria schnizleiniana =

Conservation status
- Critically Endangered (IUCN 3.1)

Scientific classification
- Kingdom: Plantae
- Clade: Tracheophytes
- Clade: Angiosperms
- Clade: Eudicots
- Clade: Rosids
- Order: Rosales
- Family: Rosaceae
- Genus: Aria
- Species: A. schnizleiniana

Binomial name
- Aria schnizleiniana (N.Mey.) Mosyakin, Fedor. & McNeill
- It is endemic to Bavaria, Germany

Synonyms
- Karpatiosorbus schnizleiniana (N.Mey.) Sennikov & Kurtto; Pyrus schnizleiniana (N.Mey.) M.F.Fay & Christenh.; Sorbus schnizleiniana N.Mey.

Species of tree in the family Rosaceae

Aria schnizleiniana, or Schnizlein's whitebeam, is an apomictic species of tree in the family Rosaceae endemic to Bavaria, Germany. It is extremely rare and threatened with extinction.

== Description ==
=== Vegetative characteristics ===
Aria schnizleiniana is an up to 12 m tall tree. The ovate, petiolate leaves of the short twigs have 8–9 pairs of lateral veins, which are set 5 mm apart. The leaf base is cuneate. The petiole is 13–20 mm long. The larger leaves of the long twigs have 9–11 pairs of lateral veins. The abaxial leaf surface is pubescent with grey hair.

=== Generative characteristics ===
The inflorescence bears 50–60 flowers with 2 partially fused styles. The pyriform, red, 12–14 mm long accessory fruit bears numerous lenticels.

=== Cytology ===
The chromosome count is 2n = 3x = 51. It is triploid.

== Taxonomy ==
It was first described as Sorbus schnizleiniana N.Mey. by Norbert Meyer in 2005. It was moved to the genus Aria (Pers.) J.Jacq. ex Host as Aria schnizleiniana (N.Mey.) Mosyakin, Fedor. & McNeill by Sergei Leonidovich Mosyakin, Mykola Mykhaylovych Fedoronchuk, and John McNeill in 2025. The type specimen was collected by N. Meyer and O. Angerer in a forest edge near Neukirchen on the 1 July 2001.

=== Etymology ===
The specific epithet schnizleiniana honours the German botanist Adalbert Schnizlein.

== Distribution and habitat ==
It is endemic to a single small area of less than 4 km^{2} in Neukirchen bei Sulzbach-Rosenberg, Bavaria, Germany, where it occurs in pine forest, on the edges of deciduous forest, and on rock ledges at elevations of 480–520 m above sea level.

== Ecology ==
Birds eat the fruit.

== Conservation ==
Aria schnizleiniana is a critically endangered species with a small but stable population of 20–40 mature trees that are restricted to a single area. It doesn't have special legal protection. It is cultivated in the ex situ conservation collections of the Nuremberg Zoo, Botanical Garden Erlangen Botanischer Garten der Universität Regensburg, and in the private collection of Karsten Horn.
