= Sorbus pinnatifida =

Sorbus pinnatifida may refer to two different plant species:

- Sorbus pinnatifida Düll, a synonym for Hedlundia thuringiaca, the German service tree
- Sorbus pinnatifida Hartig, a synonym for Hedlundia hybrida, the Finnish whitebeam
