= Sorbus hybrida =

Sorbus hybrida may refer to several different species of plants:

- Sorbus hybrida (L.) L., a synonym for Hedlundia hybrida, the Finnish whitebeam
- Sorbus hybrida Syme, a synonym for Hedlundia pseudofennica, the Arran service-tree
- Sorbus hybrida Heuff., an unplaced species of plant that cannot be brought into synonymy
- Sorbus hybrida W.D.J.Koch, an unplaced species of plant that cannot be brought into synonymy
- Sorbus hybrida Maly, an unplaced species of plant that cannot be brought into synonymy
