= Hedlundia gauckleri =

- Hedlundia gauckleri foliage

Conservation status
- Critically Endangered (IUCN 3.1)

Scientific classification
- Kingdom: Plantae
- Clade: Tracheophytes
- Clade: Angiosperms
- Clade: Eudicots
- Clade: Rosids
- Order: Rosales
- Family: Rosaceae
- Genus: Hedlundia
- Species: H. gauckleri

Binomial name
- Hedlundia gauckleri (N.Mey.) Sennikov & Kurtto
- It is endemic to Bavaria, Germany

Synonyms
- Pyrus gauckleri (N.Mey.) M.F.Fay & Christenh.; Sorbus gauckleri N.Mey.

Species of tree

Hedlundia gauckleri, or Gauckler's whitebeam, is an apomictic species of tree endemic to Bavaria, Germany. It is extremely rare and threatened by extinction.

== Description ==
=== Vegetative characteristics ===
Hedlundia gauckleri is a 3–10 m tall tree. The lobed leaves have 10–12 pairs of lateral veins, which are set 5 mm apart. The lobes are much deeper towards the base of the lamina. The abaxial leaf surface is pubescent with grey hairs.

=== Generative characteristics ===
The round fruit exceeds 1 cm in size.

=== Cytology ===
The chromosome count is 2n = 3x = 51.

== Taxonomy ==
It first described as Sorbus gauckleri N.Mey. by Norbert Meyer in 2005. It was moved to the genus Hedlundia Sennikov & Kurtto as Hedlundia gauckleri (N.Mey.) Sennikov & Kurtto by Alexander Nikolaevitsch Sennikov and Arto Kurtto in 2017. The type specimen was collected by N. Meyer and O. Angerer on the 1. of July 2001 in pine forest at the Houbirg in Bavaria, Germany.

=== Etymology ===
The specific epithet gauckleri honours the German botanist Konrad Gauckler.

== Distribution and habitat ==
It is endemic to Bavaria, Germany, where it occurs in a small area of only 4 km^{2} southeast of Hersbruck in open pine forest, rocky outcrops, and on the edges of deciduous forest at an elevation of 500 m above sea level.

== Conservation ==
It is a critically endangered species with a small population of only 41 saplings and 28 mature trees. It doesn't have special legal protection. It is cultivated in one ex situ conservation collection in the Botanical Garden Erlangen.
