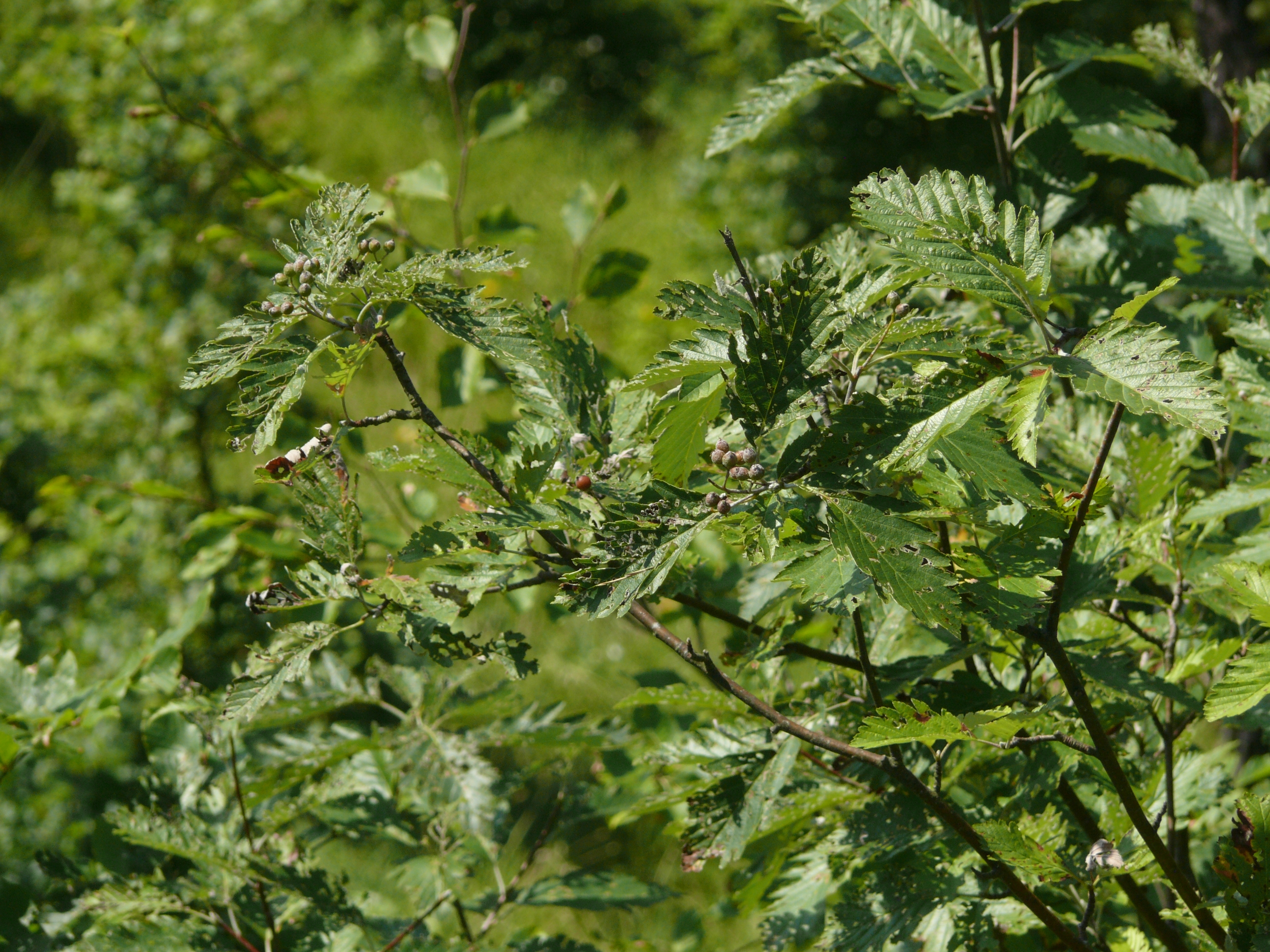
- Hedlundia pulchra growing in the northern Franconian Jura

Conservation status
- Critically Endangered (IUCN 3.1)

Scientific classification
- Kingdom: Plantae
- Clade: Tracheophytes
- Clade: Angiosperms
- Clade: Eudicots
- Clade: Rosids
- Order: Rosales
- Family: Rosaceae
- Genus: Hedlundia
- Species: H. pulchra

Binomial name
- Hedlundia pulchra (N.Mey.) Sennikov & Kurtto
- It is endemic to Bavaria, Germany

Synonyms
- Pyrus pulchra (N.Mey.) M.F.Fay & Christenh.; Sorbus pulchra N.Mey.

= Hedlundia pulchra =

Species of tree

Hedlundia pulchra, the Goessweinstein whitebeam, is an apomictic species of tree in the family Rosaceae endemic to Bavaria, Germany. It is extremely rare and threatened with extinction.

== Description ==
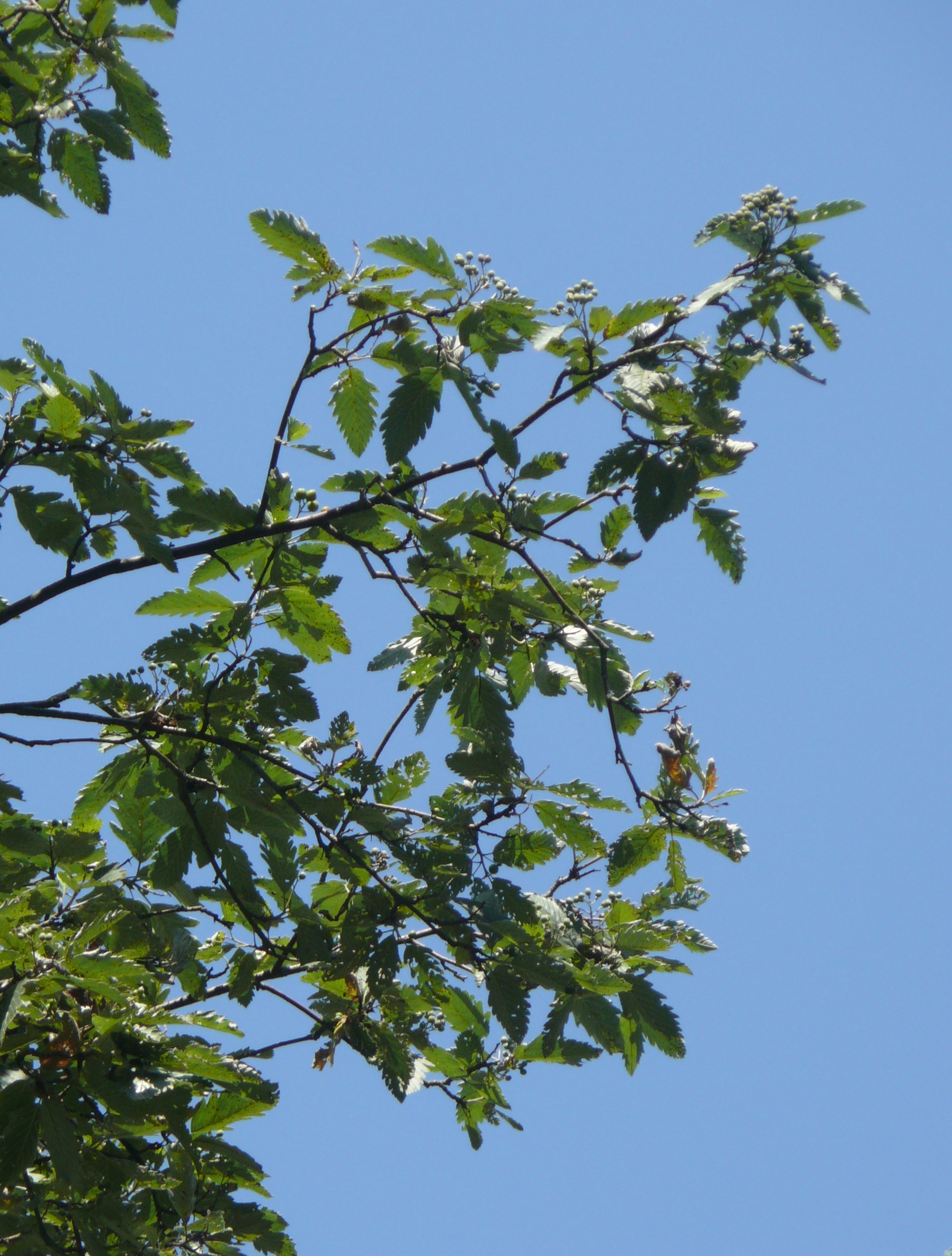
Hedlundia pulchra growing in the northern Franconian Jura

Hedlundia pulchra is a 3–10 m tall shrub or tree. The greyish green abaxial leaf surface is pubescent. The leaves have 9–11 pairs of veins positioned 8 mm apart from each other. The flowers have 2 unfused styles. The globose to elliptic, pubescent, 1 cm wide fruit bears very small lenticels.

== Taxonomy ==
It was first described as Sorbus pulchra N.Mey. by Norbert Meyer in 2005. It was moved to the genus Hedlundia Sennikov & Kurtto as Hedlundia pulchra (N.Mey.) Sennikov & Kurtto by Alexander Nikolaevitsch Sennikov and Arto Kurtto in 2017. The type specimen was collected on the 19th of May 2001 by N. Meyer and O. Angerer in the forest edge between Ezdorf and Gößweinstein in Bavaria, Germany. The genus name Hedlundia honours the Swedish botanist Johan Teodor Hedlund. The specific epithet pulchra means beautiful.

== Distribution and habitat ==
Hedlundia pulchra is endemic to Bavaria, Germany where it occurs in an area of about 50 km^{2} in open pine forest, on the edges of deciduous forest, and on rocks at elevations of 450–510 m above sea level.

== Conservation ==
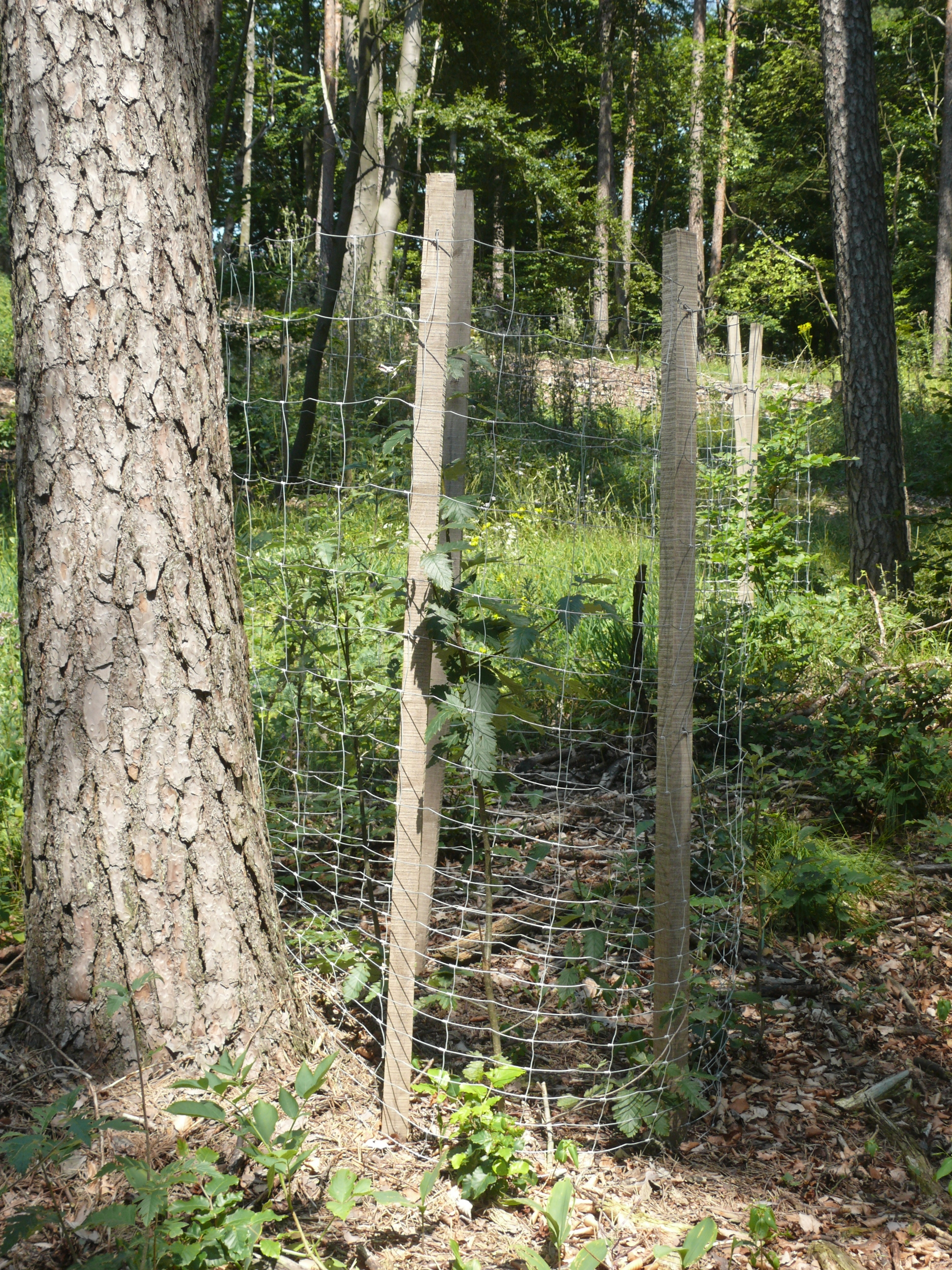
A fenced off individual of Hedlundia pulchra

It is a critically endangered species with a small population of only 75 juvenile and 25 mature individuals restricted to a small area. The species isn't covered by special legal protection. It is cultivated in an ex-situ conservation collection at the Botanical Garden Erlangen. Hedlundia pulchra saplings are also planted on private land by a nature conservation organisation.
