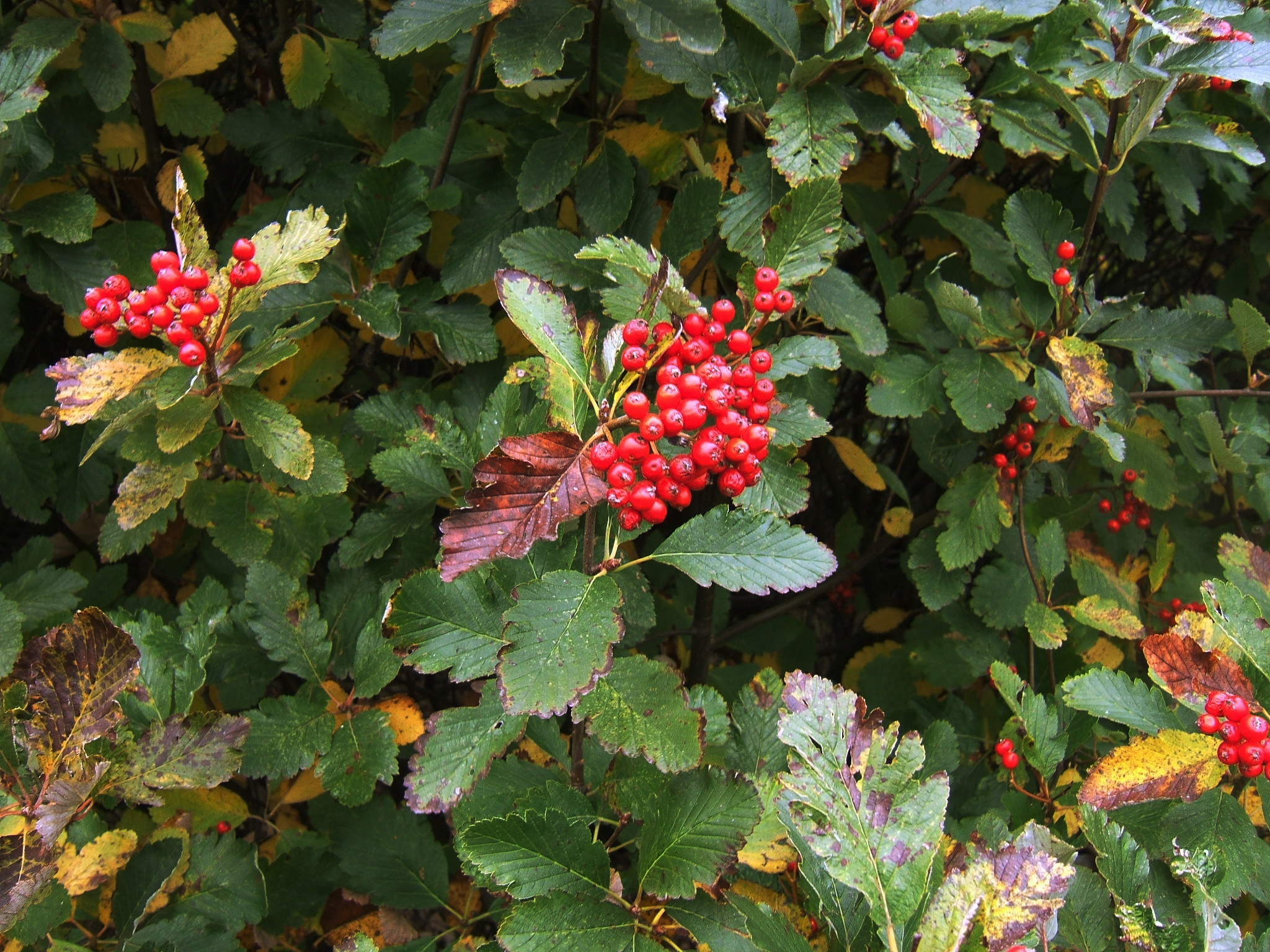
- Leaves and fruit

Conservation status
- Least Concern (IUCN 3.1)

Scientific classification
- Kingdom: Plantae
- Clade: Embryophytes
- Clade: Tracheophytes
- Clade: Angiosperms
- Clade: Eudicots
- Clade: Rosids
- Order: Rosales
- Family: Rosaceae
- Genus: Hedlundia
- Species: H. mougeotii

Binomial name
- Hedlundia mougeotii (Soy.-Will. & Godr.) Sennikov & Kurtto

Synonyms
- Synonymy: Aria mougeotii (Soy.-Will. & Godr.) Fourr.; Aria mougeotii var. typica Beck; Ariosorbus mougeotii (Soy.-Will. & Godr.) Mezhenskyj; Hahnia intermedia proles mougeotii (Soy.-Will. & Godr.) Samp.; Hahnia mougeotii (Soy.-Will. & Godr.) C.K.Schneid.; Hahnia suecica var. mougeotii (Soy.-Will. & Godr.) Dippel; Pyrus mougeotii (Soy.-Will. & Godr.) Beck; Pyrus mougeotii proles typica (Beck) Asch. & Graebn.; Sorbus aria proles mougeotii (Soy.-Will. & Godr.) Rouy & E.G.Camus; Sorbus aria subsp. mougeotii (Soy.-Will. & Godr.) O.Bolòs & Vigo; Sorbus aria var. typica (Beck) Rouy & E.G.Camus; Sorbus confusa var. fallacina (Royer) Rouy & E.G.Camus; Sorbus fallacina Royer; Sorbus mougeotii Soy.-Will. & Godr. (1858); Sorbus mougeotii var. typica C.K.Schneid.; Sorbus quernea Kovanda; Sorbus scandica Gren.; Sorbus scandica var. fallacina (Royer) Beck; Sorbus scandica lobata Ducommun; Sorbus scandica var. mougeotii (Soy.-Will. & Godr.) Gillot; Sorbus suecica var. mougeotii (Soy.-Will. & Godr.) Briq.; Sorbus tomophylla Gand.

= Hedlundia mougeotii =

Species of flowering plant

Hedlundia mougeotii, formerly Sorbus mougeotii, the Vosges whitebeam or Mougeot's whitebeam, is a species of whitebeam native to the mountains of central and western Europe from the Pyrenees east through the Alps to Austria, and north to the Vosges Mountains.

== Description ==
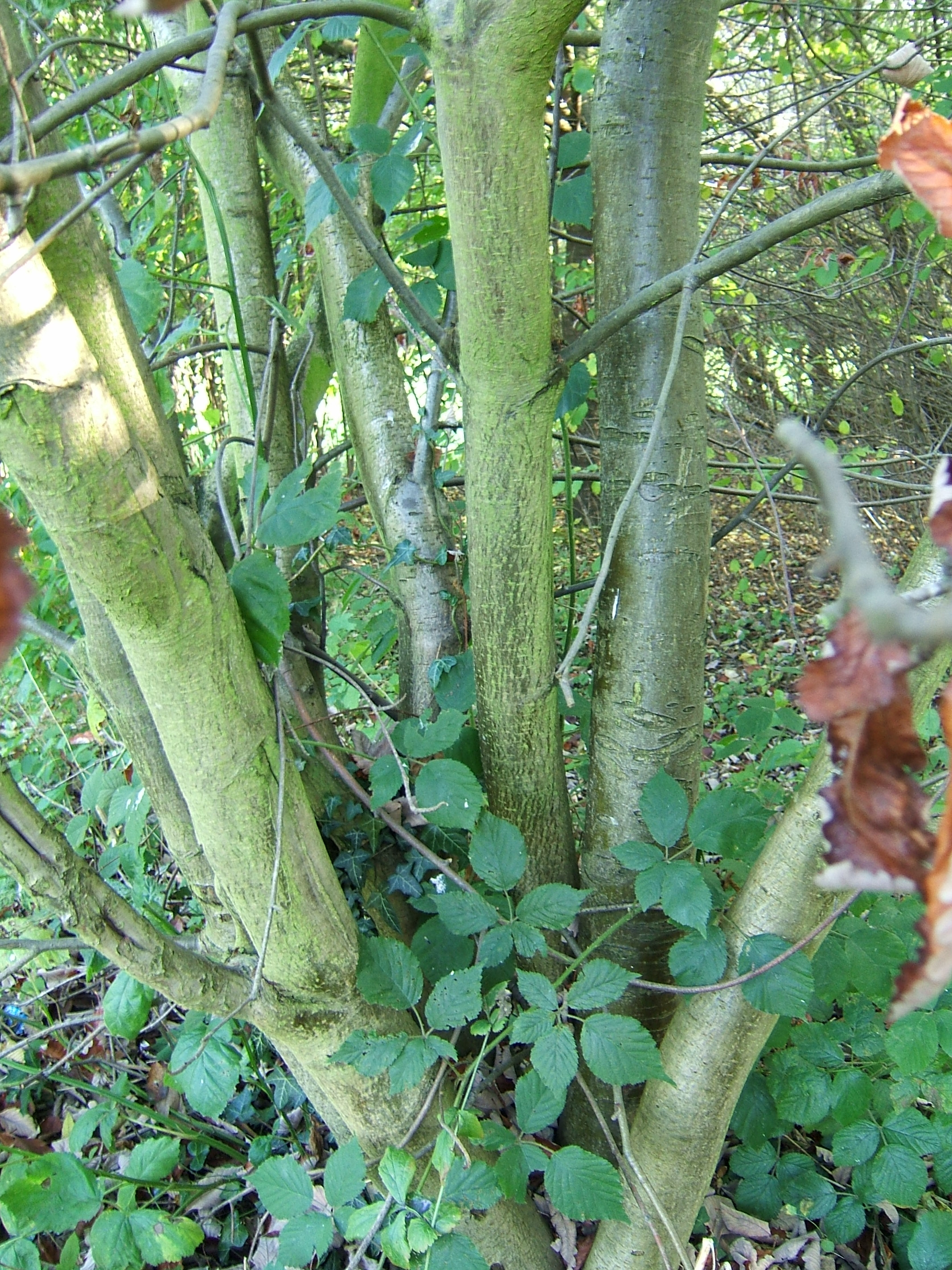
Stems (with Rubus fruticosus foliage intertwined)

It is a deciduous shrub or small tree growing to 8–10 m (rarely 20 m) tall, often multi-stemmed, with trunks up to 30 cm (rarely 50 cm) diameter and grey bark; the crown is dense, broad ovoid, with numerous erect branches. The leaves are glossy dark green above, and densely hairy with white hairs beneath, 6–10 cm long and 3–5 cm broad, broadest near the middle, shallowly lobed with seven to twelve forward-pointing lobes on each side of the leaf, bluntly pointed at the apex, and serrated margins. The autumn colour is dull grey-brown. The flowers are 10 mm diameter, with five white petals and 20 yellowish-white stamens; they are produced in corymbs 5–10 cm diameter in late spring. The fruit is a globose pome 10–12 mm diameter, bright red, maturing in mid autumn. The fruit is dryish, and eaten by thrushes and waxwings, which disperse the seeds.

== Taxonomy ==
Its closest relatives are some of the endemic British whitebeams, notably Hedlundia anglica (syn. Sorbus anglica), which differs only in slightly broader leaves. It is also closely related to Hedlundia intermedia (Swedish whitebeam; syn. Sorbus intermedia), which differs in having the leaves grey-white below and more deeply lobed, with the lobes spreading rather than forward-pointing, the fruit oval and less bright red, and in forming a stouter tree with a single trunk and more horizontal branching. All are tetraploid apomictic species which breed true without pollination, and ultimately of hybrid origin between Aria edulis (syn. Sorbus aria) and Sorbus aucuparia.

== Cultivation and uses ==
It is widely grown as an ornamental tree in northern Europe, though usually unrecognised, misidentified as Hedlundia intermedia. Although described in 1858, it was only brought into widespread cultivation in the 1950s by the Danish Heath Society, being sold as a "new improved form of Sorbus intermedia", sometimes with the cultivar name 'Latifolia' (additionally leading to confusion with Aria latifolia, syn. Sorbus latifolia). It is valued for its tolerance of urban conditions and difficult soil, and is very commonly planted in land reclamation schemes on slag heaps and roadside shrub planting. It has also proved very tolerant of oceanic climates with cold summers, growing much better than S. intermedia in coastal conditions north to the Faroe Islands.

== Gallery ==
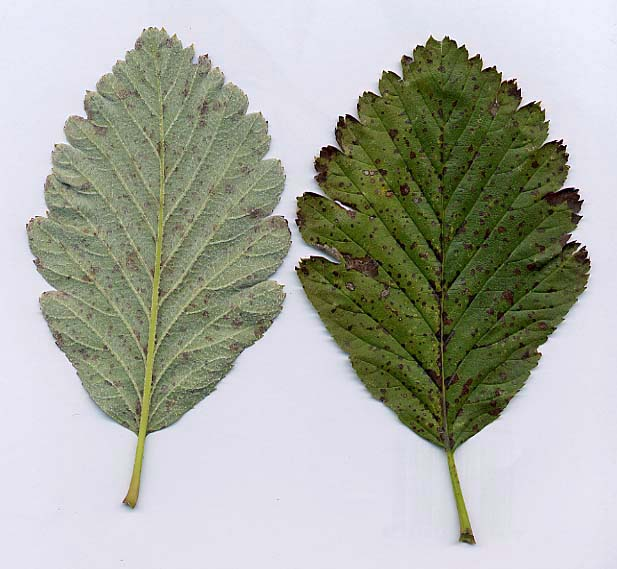
Leaves; under side, left; upper side, right

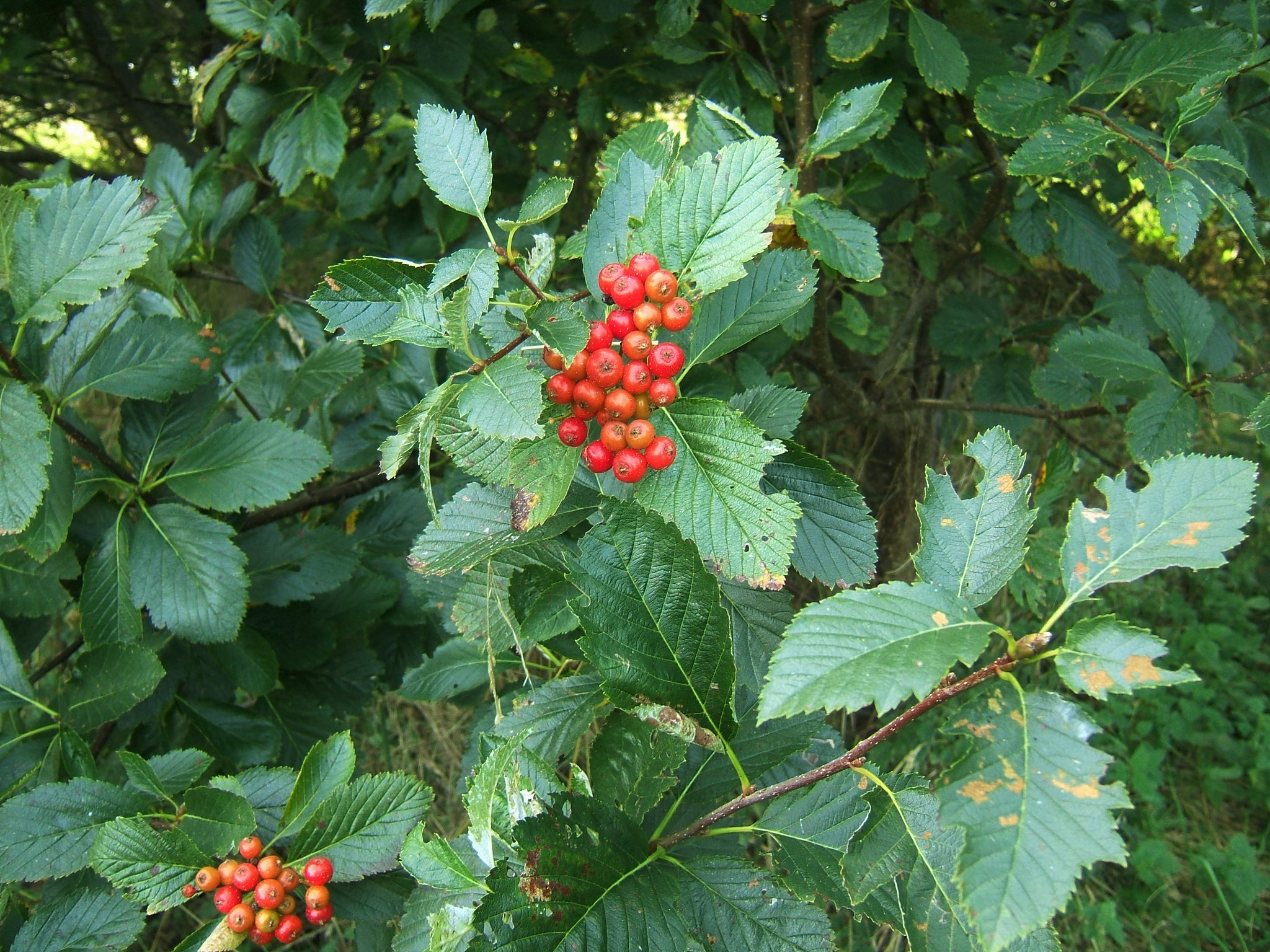
Foliage and fruit

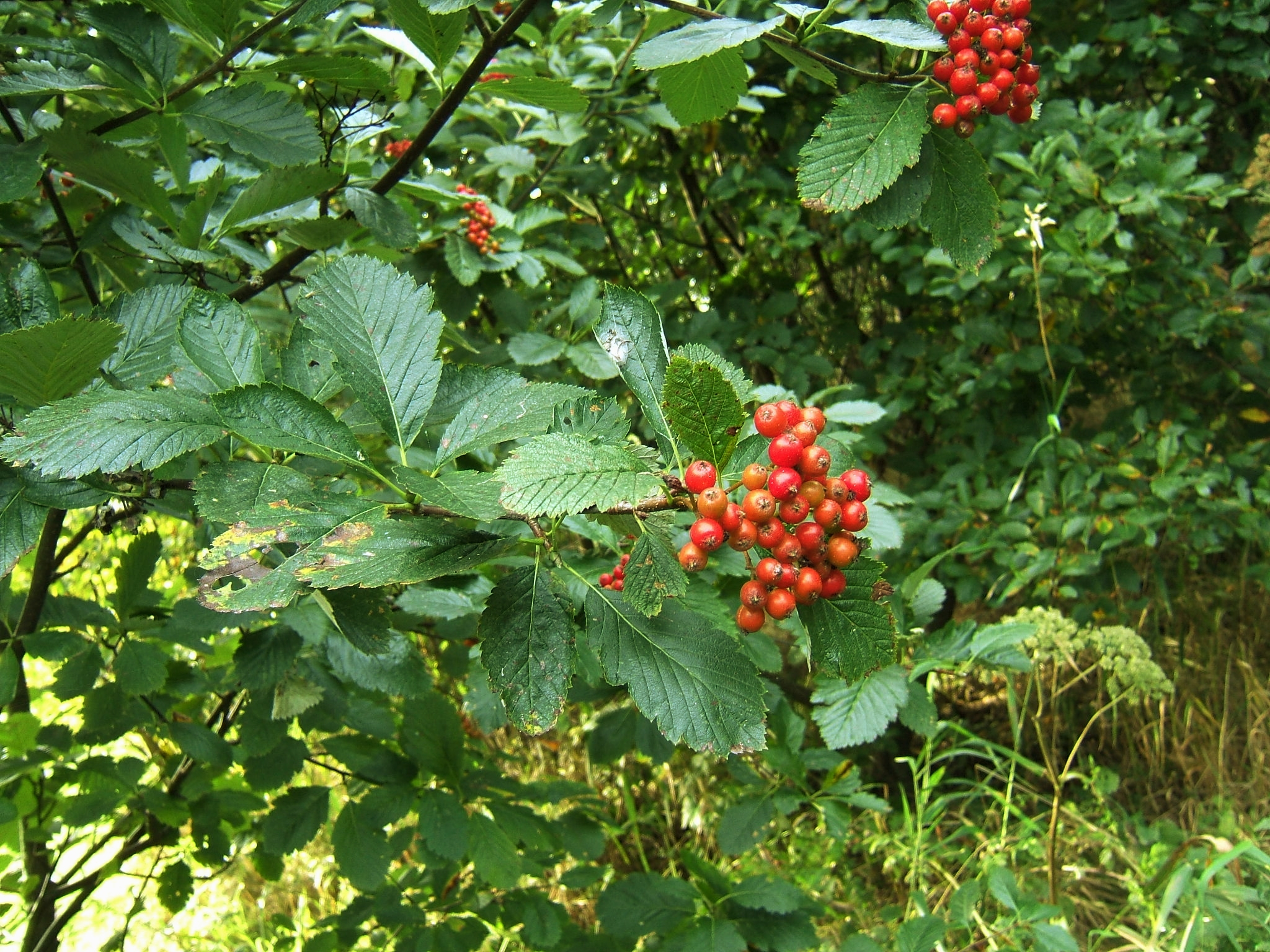
Foliage and fruit

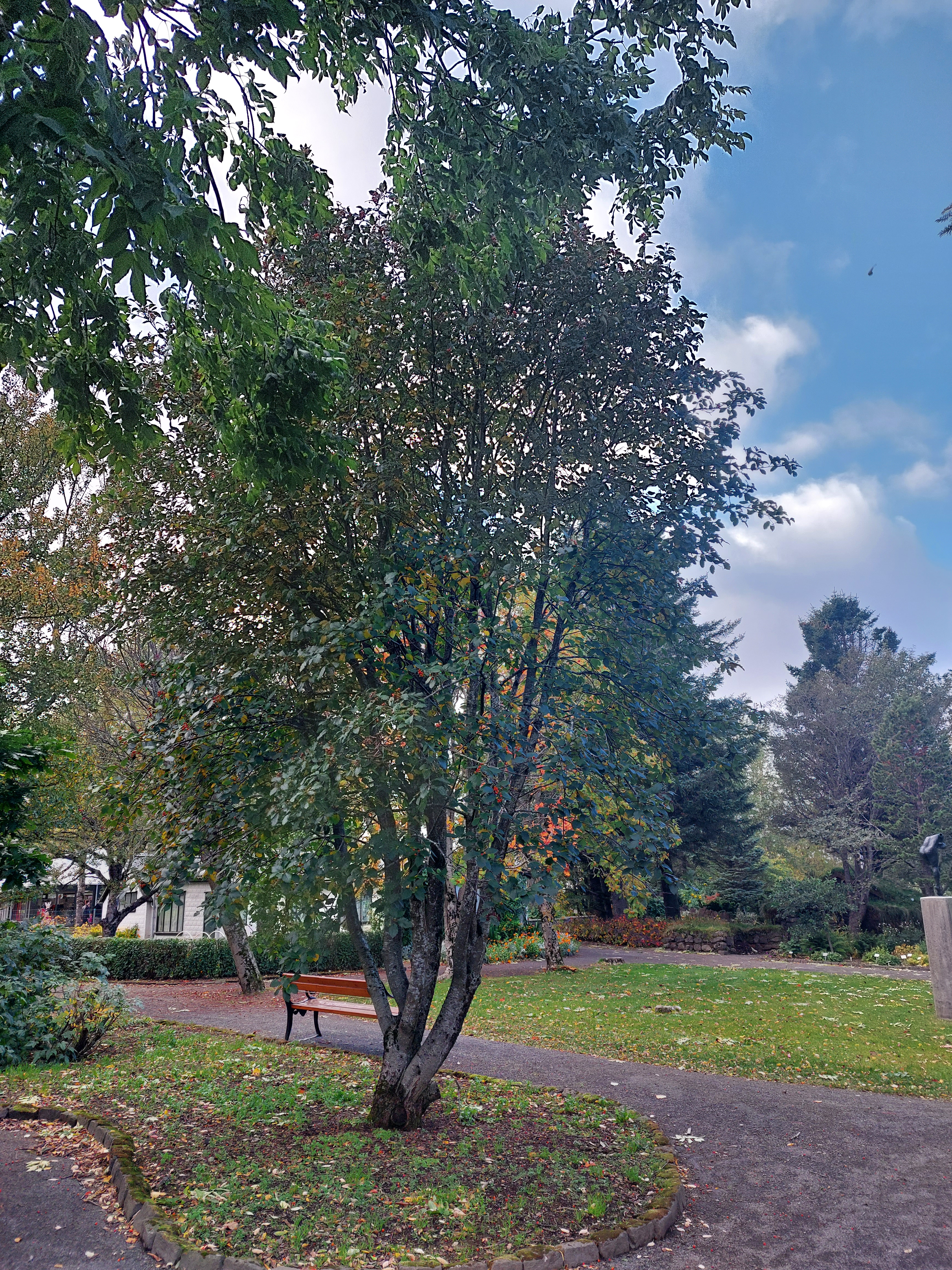
A specimen in Reykjavík Botanical Gardens.
