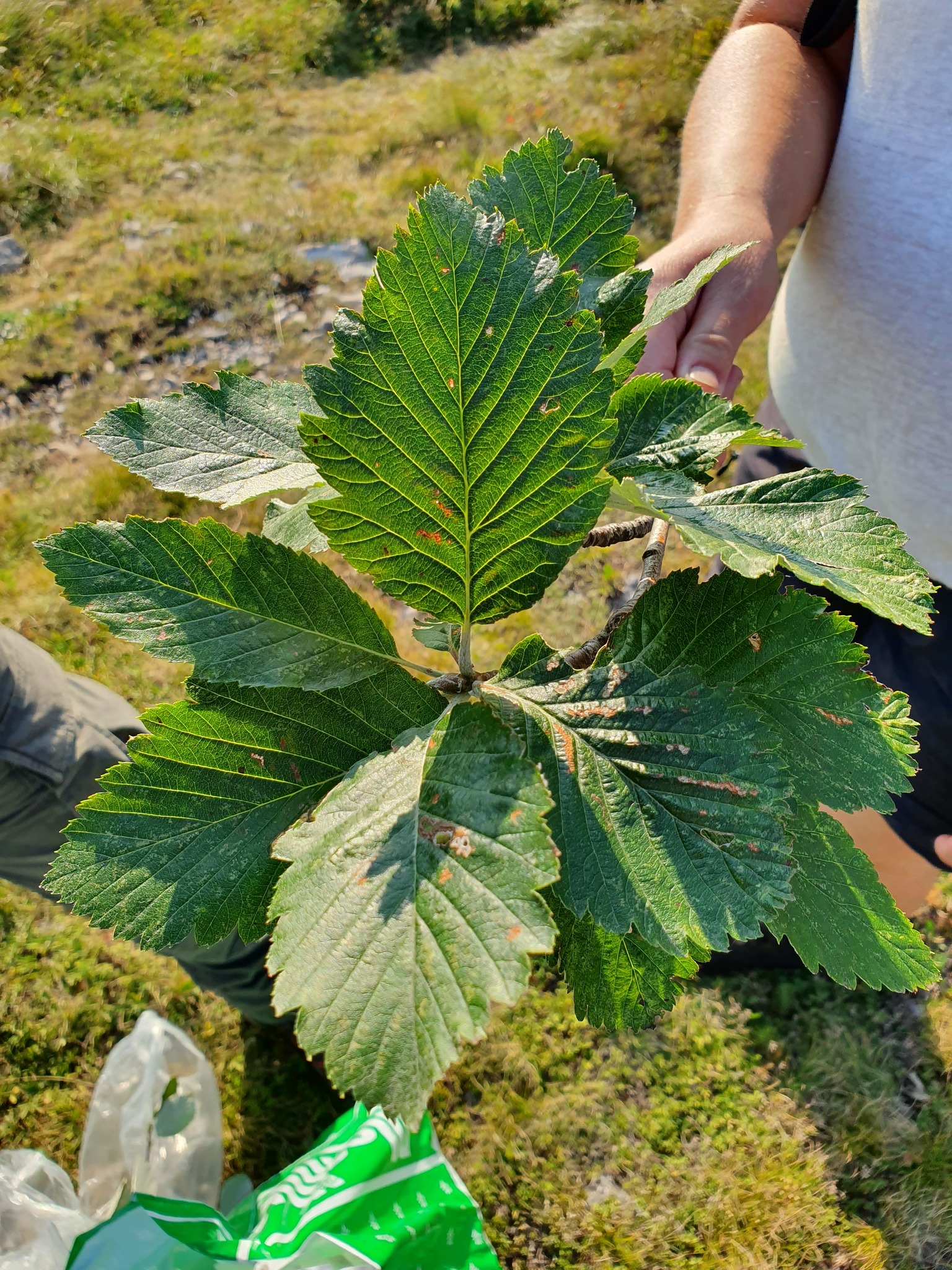
- Hedlundia austriaca growing in the Bergen University Gardens

Scientific classification
- Kingdom: Plantae
- Clade: Tracheophytes
- Clade: Angiosperms
- Clade: Eudicots
- Clade: Rosids
- Order: Rosales
- Family: Rosaceae
- Genus: Hedlundia
- Species: H. austriaca

Binomial name
- Hedlundia austriaca (Beck) Sennikov & Kurtto

Synonyms
- List: Aria austriaca (Beck) Fedor.; Aria mougeotii var. austriaca Beck; Pyrus austriaca (Beck) H.Lindb.; Pyrus mougeotii proles austriaca (Beck) Asch. & Graebn.; Pyrus pyrrhula M.F.Fay & Christenh.; Sorbus aria var. austriaca (Beck) Rouy & E.G.Camus; Sorbus aria subsp. austriaca (Beck) Soó; Sorbus austriaca (Beck) Prain; Sorbus mougeotii var. austriaca (Beck) C.K.Schneid.; Sorbus mougeotii subsp. austriaca (Beck) Hedl.; Pyrus croatica (Kárpáti) M.F.Fay & Christenh.; Sorbus austriaca subsp. croatica Kárpáti; Sorbus austriaca subsp. mayeri Kárpáti; Sorbus croatica (Kárpáti) P.D.Sell; Sorbus mayeri (Kárpáti) Mikoláš

= Hedlundia austriaca =

Species of plant

Hedlundia austriaca is a species of tree in the family Rosaceae native to central and southeastern Europe.

== Taxonomy ==
It was first described as Aria mougeotii var. austriaca Beck by Günther Beck von Mannagetta und Lerchenau in 1892. It was moved to the genus Hedlundia Sennikov & Kurtto as Hedlundia austriaca (Beck) Sennikov & Kurtto by Alexander Nikolaevitsch Sennikov and Arto Kurtto in 2017.
