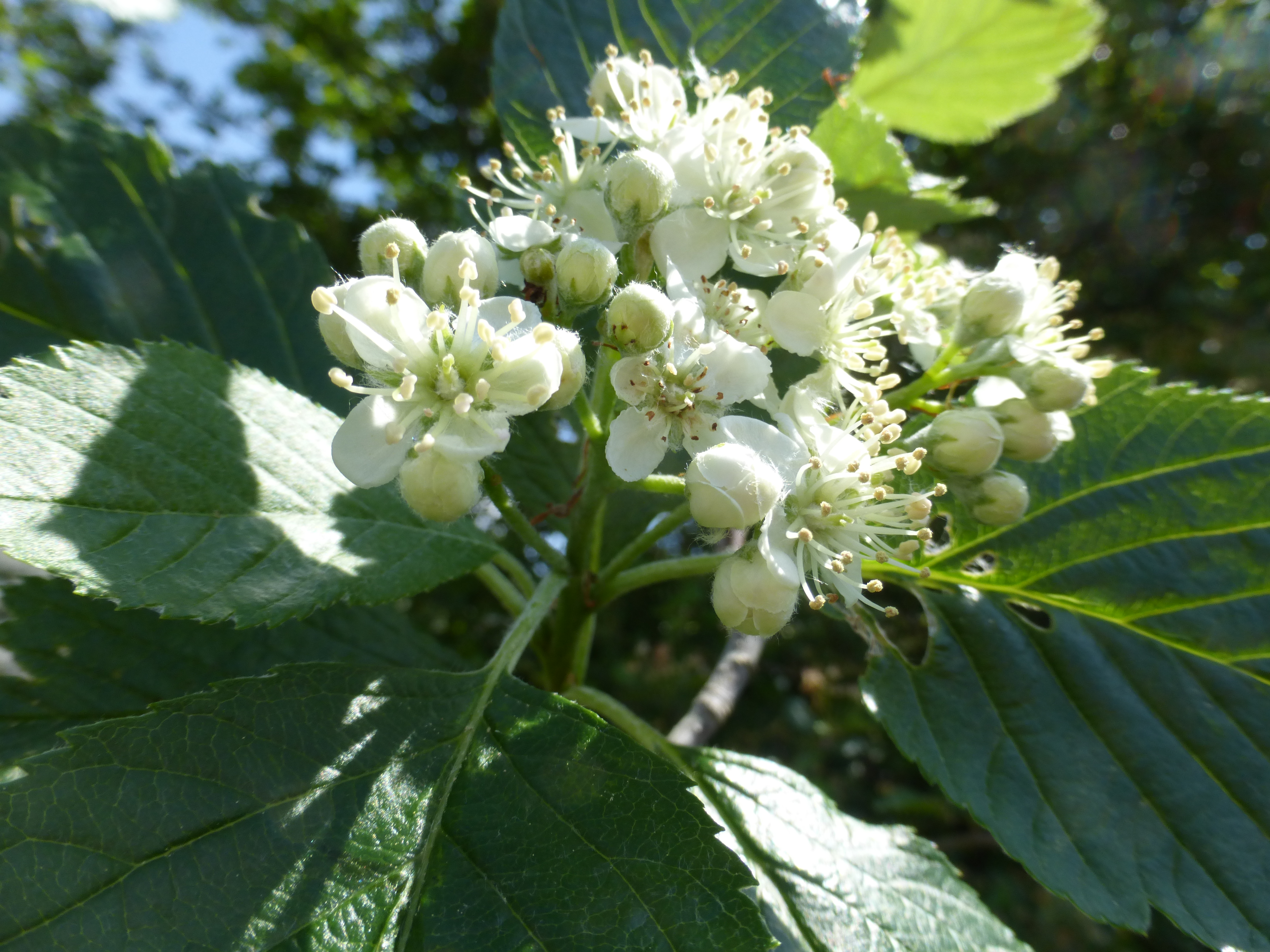
- Flowering Hedlundia lonetalensis

Conservation status
- Critically Endangered (IUCN 3.1)

Scientific classification
- Kingdom: Plantae
- Clade: Embryophytes
- Clade: Tracheophytes
- Clade: Spermatophytes
- Clade: Angiosperms
- Clade: Eudicots
- Clade: Rosids
- Order: Rosales
- Family: Rosaceae
- Genus: Hedlundia
- Species: H. lonetalensis

Binomial name
- Hedlundia lonetalensis (S.Hammel & Haynold) Sennikov & Kurtto
- It is endemic to Baden-Württemberg, Germany

Synonyms
- Pyrus lonetalensis (S.Hammel & Haynold) M.F.Fay & Christenh.; Sorbus lonetalensis S.Hammel & Haynold

= Hedlundia lonetalensis =

Species of tree

Hedlundia lonetalensis, the Lonetal whitebeam, is a species of tree in the family Rosaceae endemic to Baden-Württemberg, Germany. It is extremely rare and threatened with extinction.

== Description ==
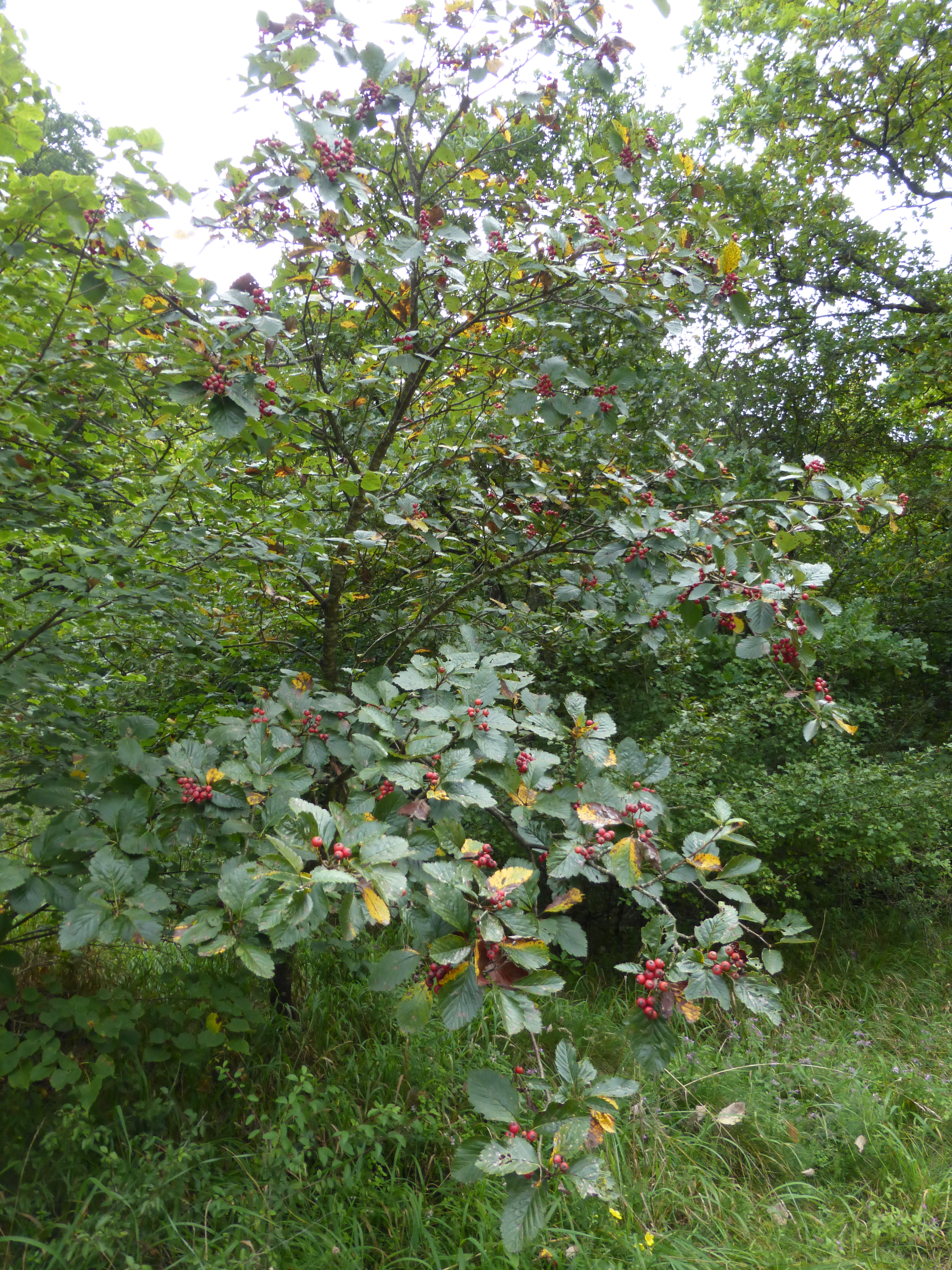
Fruiting Hedlundia lonetalensis tree

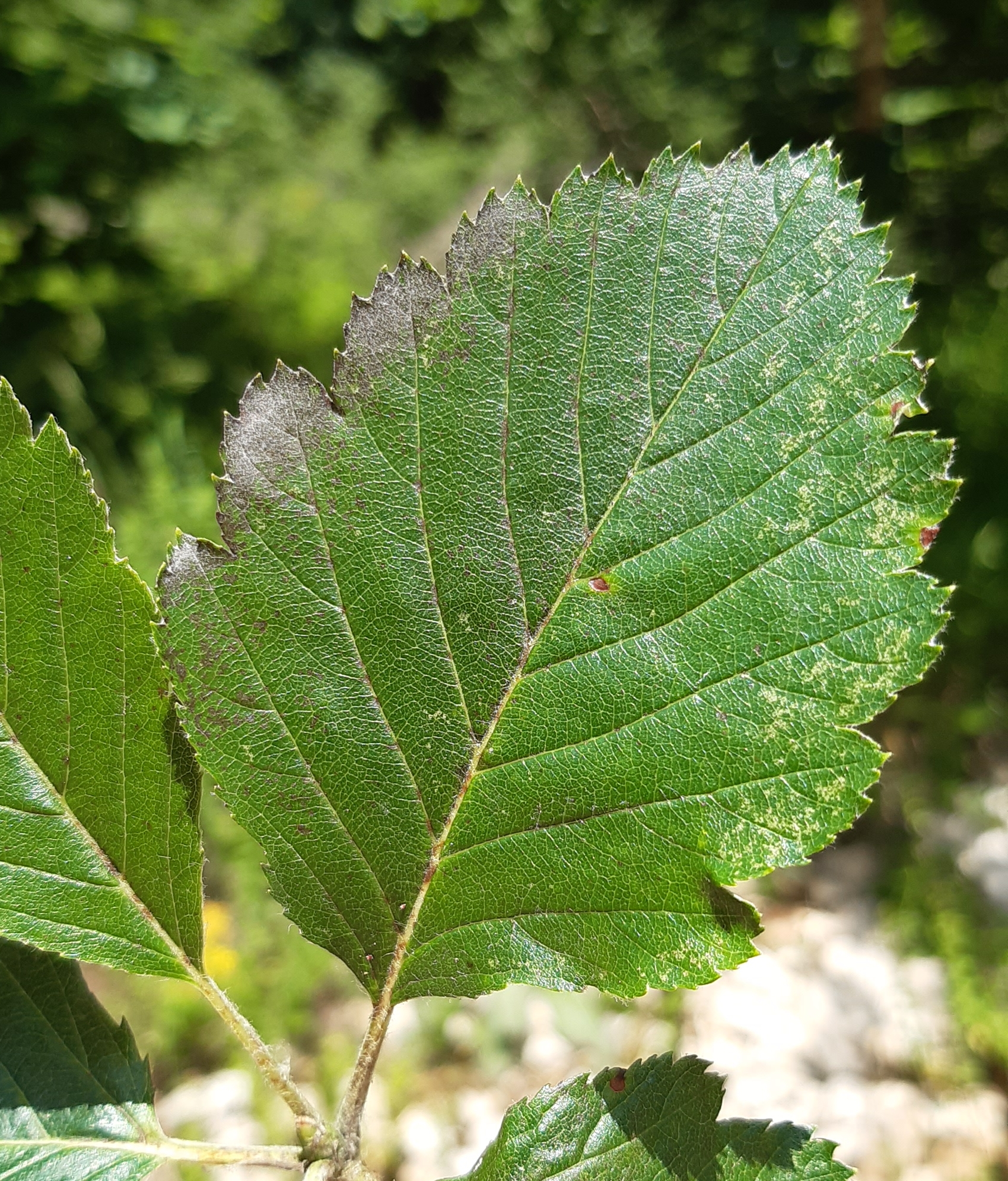
Detail of Hedlundia lonetalensis leaf

=== Vegetative characteristics ===
Hedlundia lonetalensis is a small, up to 6 m tall tree with up to 21 cm wide trunks. If it is cut down, it produces multiple trunks. The plain bark is greyish-brown.

=== Generative characteristics ===
The 4.5–6 cm wide inflorescence bears 30–40 flowers. The strongly pubescent ovary bears white hair. The 6–7 cm wide infructescence bears 10–25 small, round, apple-shaped, carmine red accessory fruits. Fertile fruits produce 1–2 brown, 6mm long, 3 mm wide, and 2.5 mm tall seeds.

=== Cytology ===
The chromosome count is 2n = 68. It is a tetraploid plant.

== Taxonomy ==
It was first published as Sorbus lonetalensis S.Hammel & Haynold by Steffen Hammel and Bernd Haynold in 2015. The type specimen was collected by Steffen Hammel on the 9th of September 2014 south of Herbrechtingen-Bissingen, Baden-Württemberg, Germany at an elevation of 480 m above sea level. The species was moved to the genus Hedlundia Sennikov & Kurtto as Hedlundia lonetalensis (S.Hammel & Haynold) Sennikov & Kurtto by Alexander Nikolaevitsch Sennikov and Arto Kurtto in 2017. The plant was first found by Thomas Meyer and was first photographed on the 31st of May 2014.

=== Etymology ===
The genus name Hedlundia honours the Swedish botanist Johan Teodor Hedlund. The specific epithet lonetalensis refers to the Lonetal valley in Baden-Württemberg, Germany.

== Distribution and habitat ==
It is endemic to Baden-Württemberg, Germany where it occurs in a single location in the south of Herbrechtingen-Bissingen in the Lonetal in between the edge of woodland and open grassland.

== Ecology ==
Alsophila caterpillars feed on Hedlundia lonetalensis leaves.

== Conservation ==
Hedlundia lonetalensis is extremely rare. It is a critically endangered species with only 10 mature individuals occurring on an area of 4 km^{2} south of Herbrechtingen-Bissingen in the Lonetal. The species doesn't have special legal protection, but the forest where it occurs has been placed under protection. It is threatened by darkening forests due to natural succession and its regeneration is limited by grazing. Only few individuals are able to reproduce, as they fail to flower under dark conditions. The habitat, as well as the number of mature individuals are declining. Three specimens were given to the Botanischer Garten der Universität Ulm for the purpose of ex-situ conservation.
