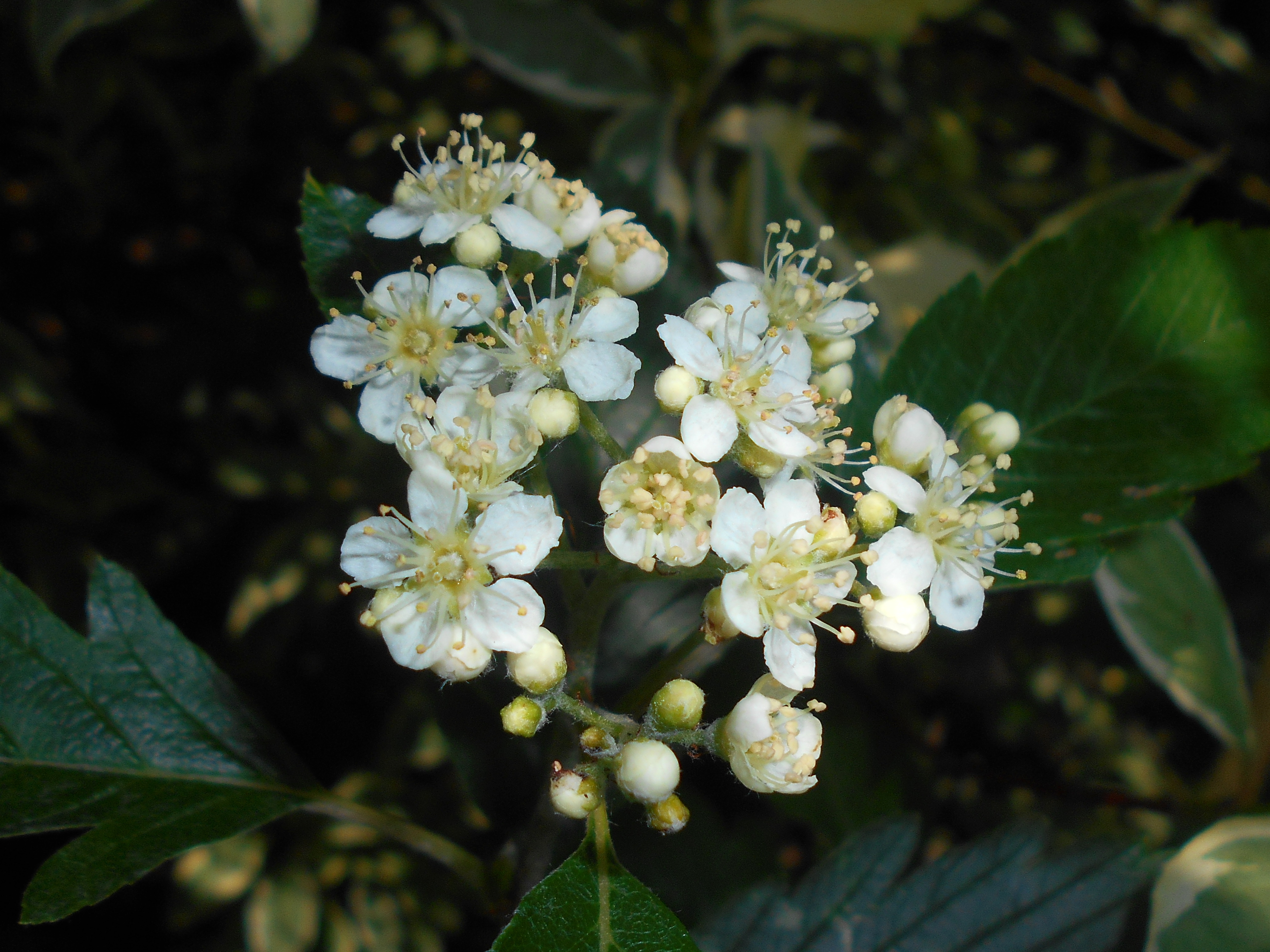
- Hedlundia minima, formerly Sorbus minima

Scientific classification
- Kingdom: Plantae
- Clade: Tracheophytes
- Clade: Angiosperms
- Clade: Eudicots
- Clade: Rosids
- Clade: Fabids
- Order: Rosales
- Family: Rosaceae
- Genus: Hedlundia; Sennikov & Kurtto

Species
- See here

Synonyms
- Borkhausenia Sennikov & Kurtto; Normeyera Sennikov & Kurtto; Scandosorbus Sennikov

= Hedlundia =

Genus of flowering plants

Hedlundia is a genus of plants in the rose family (of Rosaceae). They are shrubs or small trees that have a hybrid origin involving crosses between Aria and Sorbus sensu stricto. There are about 60 species distributed across central, western and southern Europe, Scandinavia, Turkey, the Caucasus, Crimea, Iran, and central Asia. The name Hedlundia was published in 2017.

== Description ==
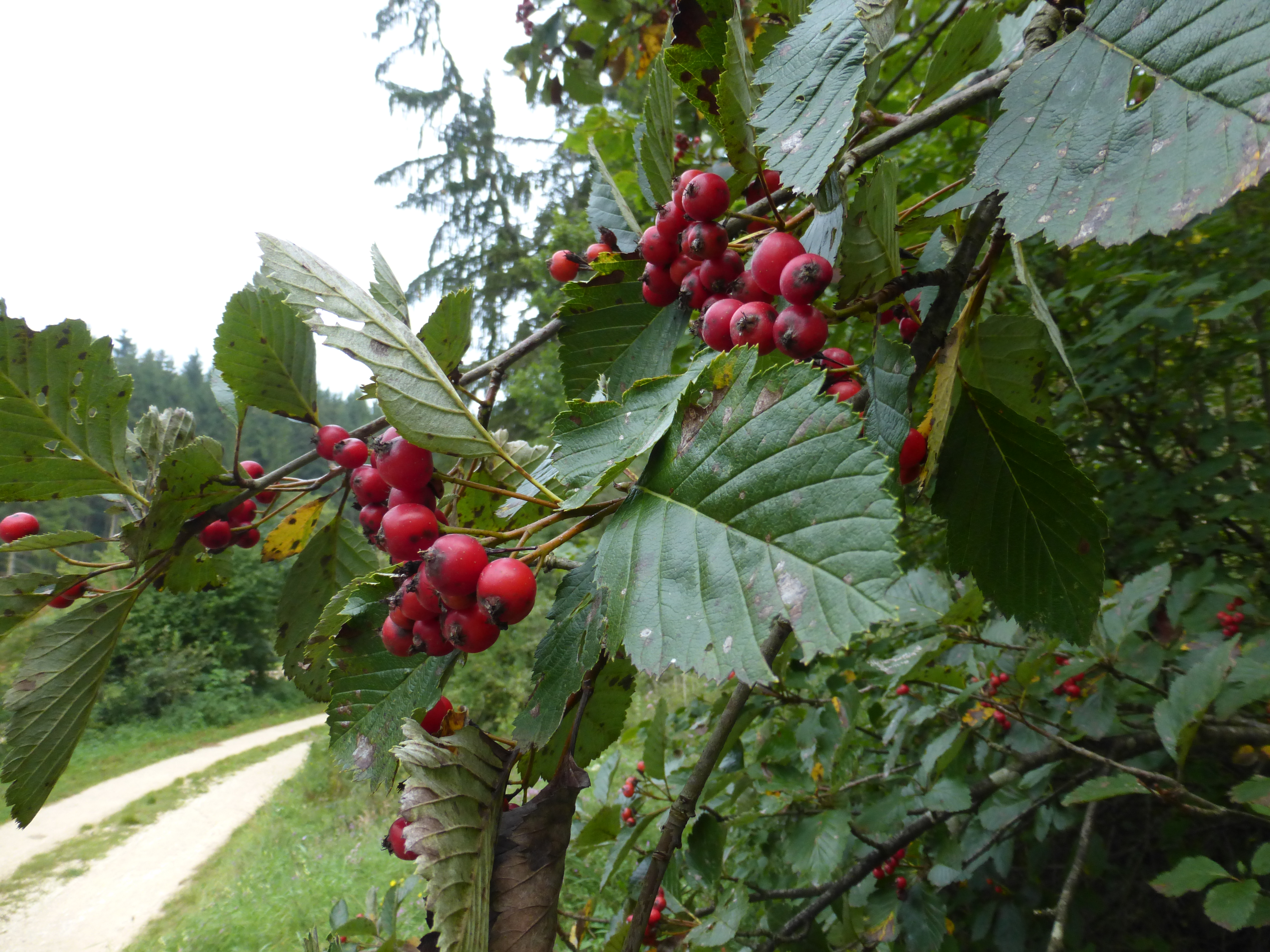
Fruit of Hedlundia lonetalensis (syn. Sorbus lonetalensis) in Herbrechtingen-Bissingen, Baden-Württemberg, Germany

Hedlundia species are small trees or shrubs, with simple leaves, pinnatilobate (having lobes arranged in a pinnate manner) or basally pinnate with 1–2(–3) leaflets. They are white- or greenish-grey-tomentose (covered with dense, matted, woolly hairs) beneath, with 7–15 pairs of lateral veins, with small to prominent, long, sub-acute to obtuse lobes with a variable number of teeth.

They have flowers with white petals and 2–3 styles. The fruit is medium-sized, orange-red to crimson in colour, with few to sparse small lenticels (porous tissue consisting of cells).

== Taxonomy ==
The genus Hedlundia was described by Alexander Nikolaevitsch Sennikov and Arto Kurtto in 2017. The type species is Hedlundia hybrida (L.) Sennikov & Kurtto. The genus has arisen via hybridisation events between the genera Aria (Pers.) Host and Sorbus (L.). Genera of hybrid origin need to have a new name to distinguish it from the two parental genera. Therefore, the species that arose via hybridisation between Sorbus s.str. and Aria needed a new genus name.

The hybrid term ×Ariosorbus was used by Mezhenskyj et al., 2012.

European and West Asian hybrid species involving Aria edulis (all) with variously Sorbus aucuparia, Torminalis clusii and rarely Chamaemespilus alpina are treated in Sennikov & Kurtto (2017) under the genera Hedlundia Sennikov & Kurtto (Aria × Sorbus), Borkhausenia Sennikov & Kurtto (Aria × Sorbus × Torminalis), Karpatiosorbus Sennikov & Kurtto (Aria × Torminalis), Majovskya Sennikov & Kurtto (Aria × Chamaemespilus) and Normeyera Sennikov & Kurtto (Aria × Chamaemespilus × Sorbus).

Some of the species result from more than one hybridization event. Hedlundia arranensis arose via hybridization of Sorbus aucuparia and Aria rupicola. Hedlundia pseudofennica is the result of back-crossing of Hedlundia arranensis onto Sorbus aucuparia.

While including this species in Hedlundia reflected the broad contributions of the parental genomes, extending the splitting approach to its logical conclusion, the Arran service tree could be treated in another nothogenus with a name like × Sorbohedlundia. To make matters yet more complex again, Hedlundia pseudomeinichii is the result of a further round of back-crossing of Hedlundia pseudofennica with Sorbus aucuparia. Problems still occur, such as the naming of the cross could this be "×Sorbosorbohedlundia" ? Including taxa like S. pseudofennica and S. pseudomeinichii in Hedlundia, as done by Sennikov & Kurtto (2017), means that Hedlundia becomes a name applied to taxa with distinct evolutionary histories.

=== Etymology ===
The genus name Hedlundia is dedicated to the Swedish Sorbus expert Johan Teodor Hedlund (1861 - 1953), who contributed very much to the early understanding of the Sorbus hybrida aggr. in Scandinavia and Britain". He had studied species variation in this group of trees and published nearly 50 new names or combinations of Sorbus in 1901.

They are known as limipihlajat (in Finnish) and rönnoxlar (in Swedish).

=== Species ===
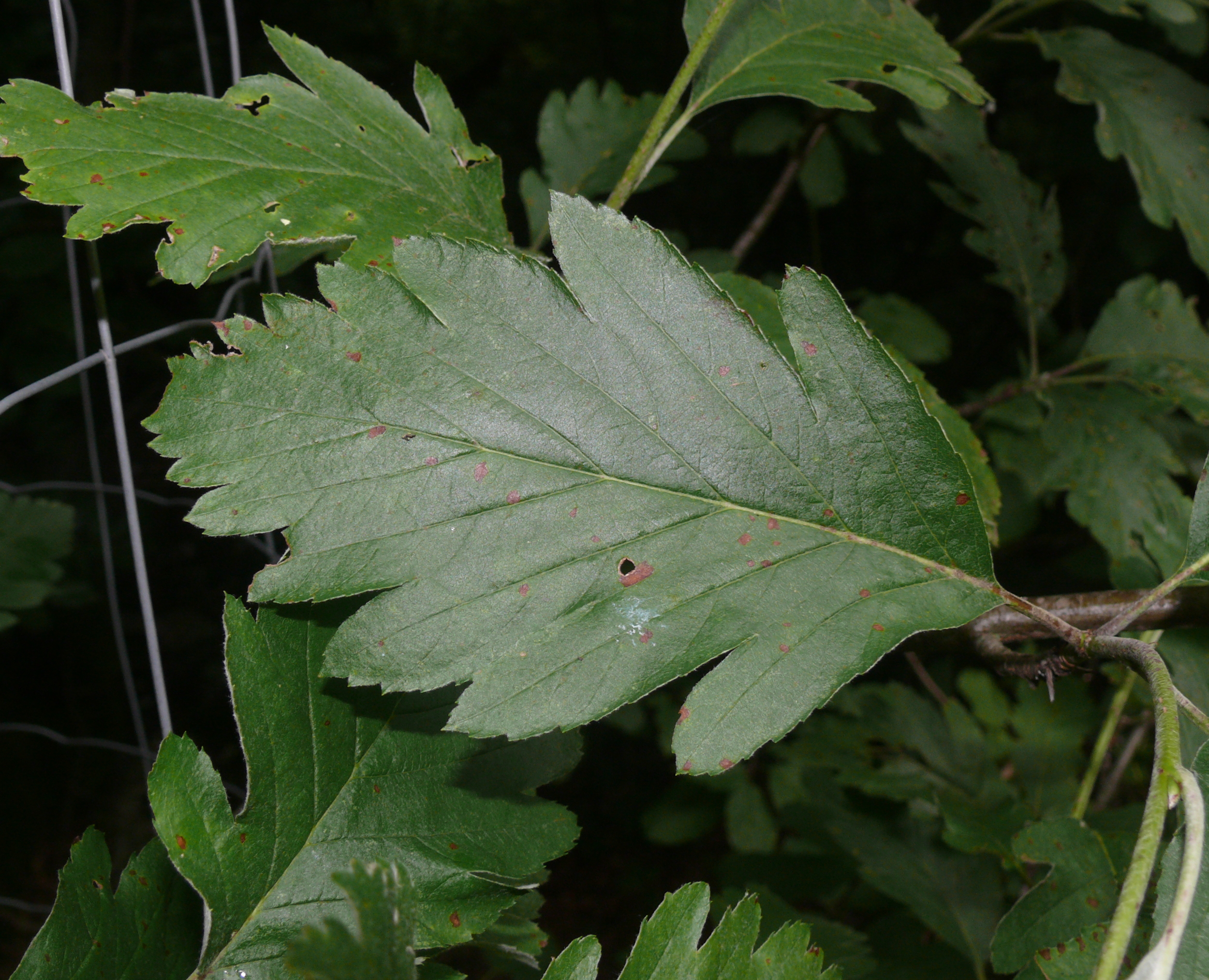
Hedlundia hohenesteri (syn. Sorbus hohenesteri)

According to Kew and Plants of the World Online:

- Hedlundia abscondita (Kovanda) Sennikov & Kurtto
- Hedlundia anglica (Hedl.) Sennikov & Kurtto
- Hedlundia armeniaca (Hedl.) Mezhenskyj
- Hedlundia arranensis (Hedl.) Sennikov & Kurtto
- Hedlundia atrimontis (Bernátová & Májovský) Mosyakin, Fedor. & McNeill
- Hedlundia austriaca (Beck) Sennikov & Kurtto
- Hedlundia borbasii (Jáv.) Sennikov & Kurtto
- Hedlundia bosniaca (Hajrud., Frajman, Schönsw. & Bogunic) Sennikov & Kurtto
- Hedlundia buekkensis (Soó) Sennikov & Kurtto
- Hedlundia caeruleomontana (Bernátová & Májovský) Mosyakin, Fedor. & McNeill
- Hedlundia cuneifolia (T.C.G.Rich) Sennikov & Kurtto
- Hedlundia diversicolor (Bernátová & Májovský) Mosyakin, Fedor. & McNeill
- Hedlundia doerriana (N.Mey.) Mosyakin, Fedor. & McNeill
- Hedlundia gauckleri (N.Mey.) Sennikov & Kurtto
- Hedlundia harziana (N.Mey.) Sennikov & Kurtto
- Hedlundia hazslinszkyana (Soó) Sennikov & Kurtto
- Hedlundia hohenesteri (N.Mey.) Sennikov & Kurtto
- Hedlundia hornadensis (Mikoláŝ) Sennikov & Kurtto
- Hedlundia hostii (J.Jacq. ex Host) Mosyakin, Fedor. & McNeill
- Hedlundia hybrida (L.) Sennikov & Kurtto
- Hedlundia intermedia (Ehrh.) Mosyakin, Fedor. & McNeill
- Hedlundia kuznetzovii (Zinserl.) Mezhenskyj
- Hedlundia lancifolia (Hedl.) Sennikov & Kurtto
- Hedlundia legrei (Cornier) Sennikov & Kurtto
- Hedlundia leyana (Wilmott) Sennikov & Kurtto
- Hedlundia liljeforsii (T.C.G.Rich) Mosyakin, Fedor. & McNeill
- Hedlundia lippertiana (N.Mey. & Meierott) N.Mey.
- Hedlundia lonetalensis (S.Hammel & Haynold) Sennikov & Kurtto
- Hedlundia luristanica (Bornm.) Mezhenskyj
- Hedlundia margittaiana (Jáv.) Mosyakin, Fedor. & McNeill
- Hedlundia meinichii (Lindeb. ex Hartm.) Sennikov & Kurtto
- Hedlundia minima (Ley) Sennikov & Kurtto
- Hedlundia montisalpae (Bernátová & Májovský) Mosyakin, Fedor. & McNeill
- Hedlundia motleyi (T.C.G.Rich) Sennikov & Kurtto
- Hedlundia mougeotii (Soy.-Will. & Godr.) Sennikov & Kurtto
- Hedlundia neglecta (Hedl.) Sennikov & Kurtto
- Hedlundia neopinnatifida (P.D.Sell) Sennikov & Kurtto
- Hedlundia pauca (M.Lepší & P.Lepší) Sennikov & Kurtto
- Hedlundia pekarovae (Májovský & Bernátová) Sennikov & Kurtto
- Hedlundia persica (Hedl.) Mezhenskyj
- Hedlundia pseudofennica (E.F.Warb.) Sennikov & Kurtto
- Hedlundia pseudomeinichii (Ashley Robertson) Sennikov & Kurtto
- Hedlundia pseudothuringiaca (Düll) Sennikov & Kurtto
- Hedlundia pulchra (N.Mey.) Sennikov & Kurtto
- Hedlundia roopiana (Bordz.) Sennikov & Kurtto
- Hedlundia salatini (Bernátová & Májovský) Mosyakin, Fedor. & McNeill
- Hedlundia scannelliana (T.C.G.Rich) Sennikov & Kurtto
- Hedlundia scepusiensis (Kovanda) Sennikov & Kurtto
- Hedlundia schinzii (Düll) Mosyakin, Fedor. & McNeill
- Hedlundia schwarziana (N.Mey.) Sennikov & Kurtto
- Hedlundia semipinnata (Borbás) Sennikov & Kurtto
- Hedlundia sognensis (Hedl. ex Sennikov, Hjertson & Salvesen) Sennikov & Kurtto
- Hedlundia subarranensis (Hyl. ex Sennikov, Hjertson & Salvesen) Sennikov & Kurtto
- Hedlundia subpinnata (Hedl.) Sennikov & Kurtto
- Hedlundia subsimilis (Hedl.) Sennikov & Kurtto
- Hedlundia takhtajanii (Gabrieljan) Mezhenskyj
- Hedlundia tamamschjanae (Gabrieljan) Mezhenskyj
- Hedlundia tauricola (Zaik. ex Sennikov) Mosyakin, Fedor. & McNeill
- Hedlundia teodori (Liljef.) Sennikov & Kurtto
- Hedlundia velebitica (Kárpáti) Sennikov & Kurtto

=== Formerly placed here ===
- × Arsorbus thuringiaca (Nyman) Z.H.Feng & Su Liu (as Hedlundia thuringiaca (Nyman) Sennikov & Kurtto)

== Distribution and habitat ==
They are native to most parts of Europe (within Albania, Austria, Baltic States, Bulgaria, Crimea, Czechoslovakia, Denmark, Finland, France, Germany, Great Britain, Greece, Hungary, Ireland, Italy, Norway, Romania, Spain, Sweden, Switzerland and Yugoslavia). As well as parts of central Asia, (within Kazakhstan, Kirghistan, North Caucasus, Tajikistan, Transcaucasus, Turkmenistan and Uzbekistan) and a few regions in the western Asia, (within Iran and Turkey).

Nine of the species occur as natives in the Nordic countries, most of which grow on the west coast of Norway. Species have also been recorded on the island of Sicily. Species, Hedlundia austriaca, Hedlundia hybrida and Hedlundia mougeotii are all found in Finland.

They have been introduced into several countries (and regions) including; Belgium, parts of Central European Russia and parts of USA (within the states of Illinois, New Brunswick, Utah, Vermont and Washington).

The various Hedlundia species can grow in a variety of places. Such as Hedlundia anglica is usually found growing on cliffs, quarries and rocky hillsides. While, Hedlundia hybrida grows on rocky meadow banks and in broadleaf woods.

== Conservation ==
Hedlundia schwarziana is a critically endangered species endemic to Germany. It is threatened by forest management changes which includes forest clearance and shading from spruce plantations.

Hedlundia persica is rare and red-listed in Kyrgyzstan.

Hedlundia pseudofennica, which is endemic to the Isle of Arran in Scotland, is threatened by habitat loss.

The Llangollen whitebeam Hedlundia cuneifolia from Wales, UK has been assessed on the IUCN Red List of Threatened Species as 'Endangered'.

== Uses ==
Several species are grown as ornamental trees, such as a specimen tree of Hedlundia tamamschjanae, which grows in Kew Gardens and was introduced to Britain by the Armenian botanist Dr Eleonora Gabrieljan.

Hedlundia persica is used as a source of firewood in Iran, Kazakhstan, Kyrgyzstan, Tajikistan, Turkey, Turkmenistan and Uzbekistan.

== Other sources ==
- Kurtto, A., Sennikov, A.N. & Lampinen, R. (2018). Atlas Florae Europaeae. Distribution of vascular plants in Europe 17: 1–132.
