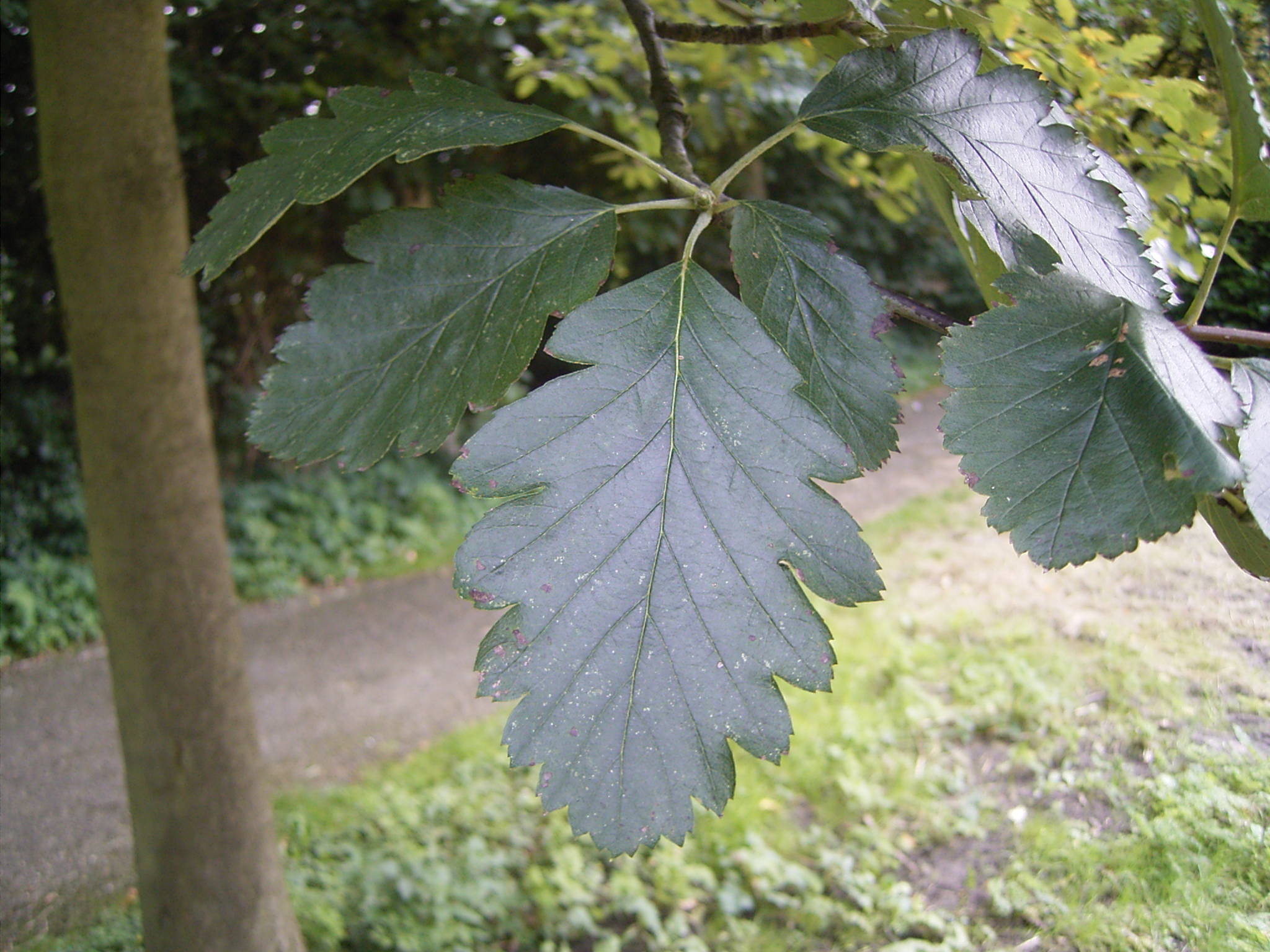
- Leaves
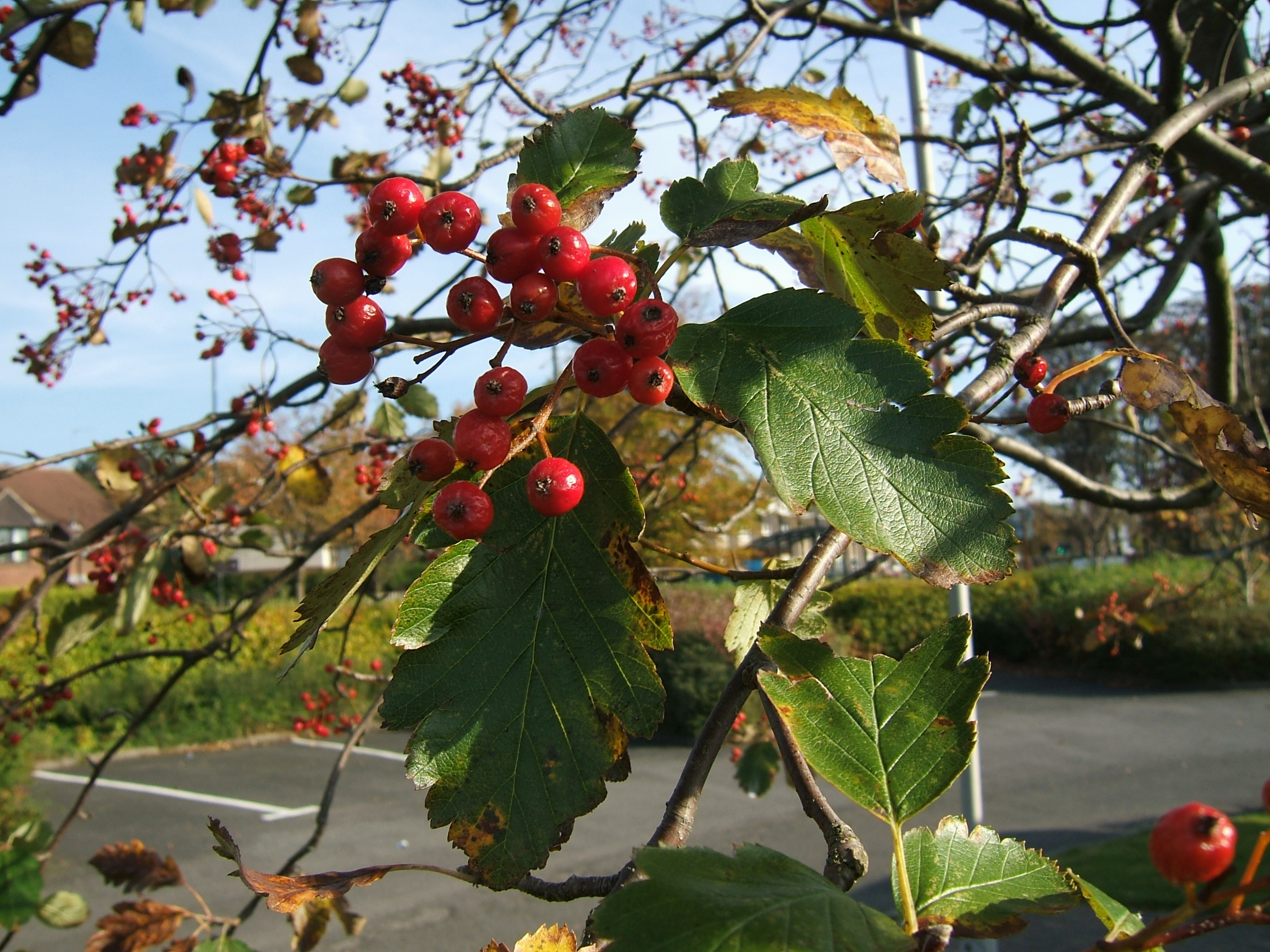
- Ripe fruit

Conservation status
- Least Concern (IUCN 3.1)

Scientific classification
- Kingdom: Plantae
- Clade: Tracheophytes
- Clade: Angiosperms
- Clade: Eudicots
- Clade: Rosids
- Order: Rosales
- Family: Rosaceae
- Genus: Hedlundia
- Species: H. intermedia

Binomial name
- Hedlundia intermedia (Ehrh.) Mosyakin, Fedor. & McNeill

Synonyms
- Synonymy: Aria intermedia (Ehrh.) Schur; Aria nivea subsp. scandica (Syme) Bonnier & Layens; Aria scandica M.Roem.; Aria suecica (L.) Koehne; Borkhausenia intermedia (Ehrh.) Sennikov & Kurtto; Crataegus aria var. scandica L.; Crataegus aria var. suecica L.; Crataegus intermedia (Ehrh.) Dum.Cours.; Crataegus scandica Wahlenb.; Hahnia intermedia (Ehrh.) Samp.; Hahnia suecica (L.) Dippel; Lazarolus intermedia (Ehrh.) Borkh.; Pyrus aria subsp. intermedia (Ehrh.) Hook.f.; Pyrus aria subsp. scandica Syme; Pyrus intermedia'' Ehrh.; Pyrus conwentzii Graebn.; Pyrus intermedia var. angustifolia DC.; Pyrus intermedia var. lanceolata Godr.; Pyrus intermedia var. pinnatifida Regel ex Lipsky; Pyrus semipinnata Bechst.; Pyrus suecica (L.) Garcke; Pyrus scandica Bab.; Scandosorbus intermedia (Ehrh.) Sennikov; × Sorbotoraria intermedia (Ehrh.) Mezhenskyj; Sorbus alnoides Gand.; Sorbus aria subsp. scandica (Syme) Rouy & E.G.Camus; Sorbus conwentzii (Graebn.) C.K.Schneid.; Sorbus intermedia (Ehrh.) Pers.; Sorbus latifolia subsp. scandica (Syme) Berher; Sorbus scandiaca Fr.; Sorbus suecica (L.) Krok ex Hedl.; × Tormariosorbus intermedia (Ehrh.) Mezhenskyj

= Hedlundia intermedia =

Species of whitebeam found in northern Europe

Hedlundia intermedia or, formerly, Sorbus intermedia, the Swedish whitebeam, is a species of whitebeam found in southern Sweden, with scattered natural occurrences in Estonia, Latvia, easternmost Denmark (Bornholm), the far southwest of Finland, and northern Poland. It also occurs in England .

== Description ==
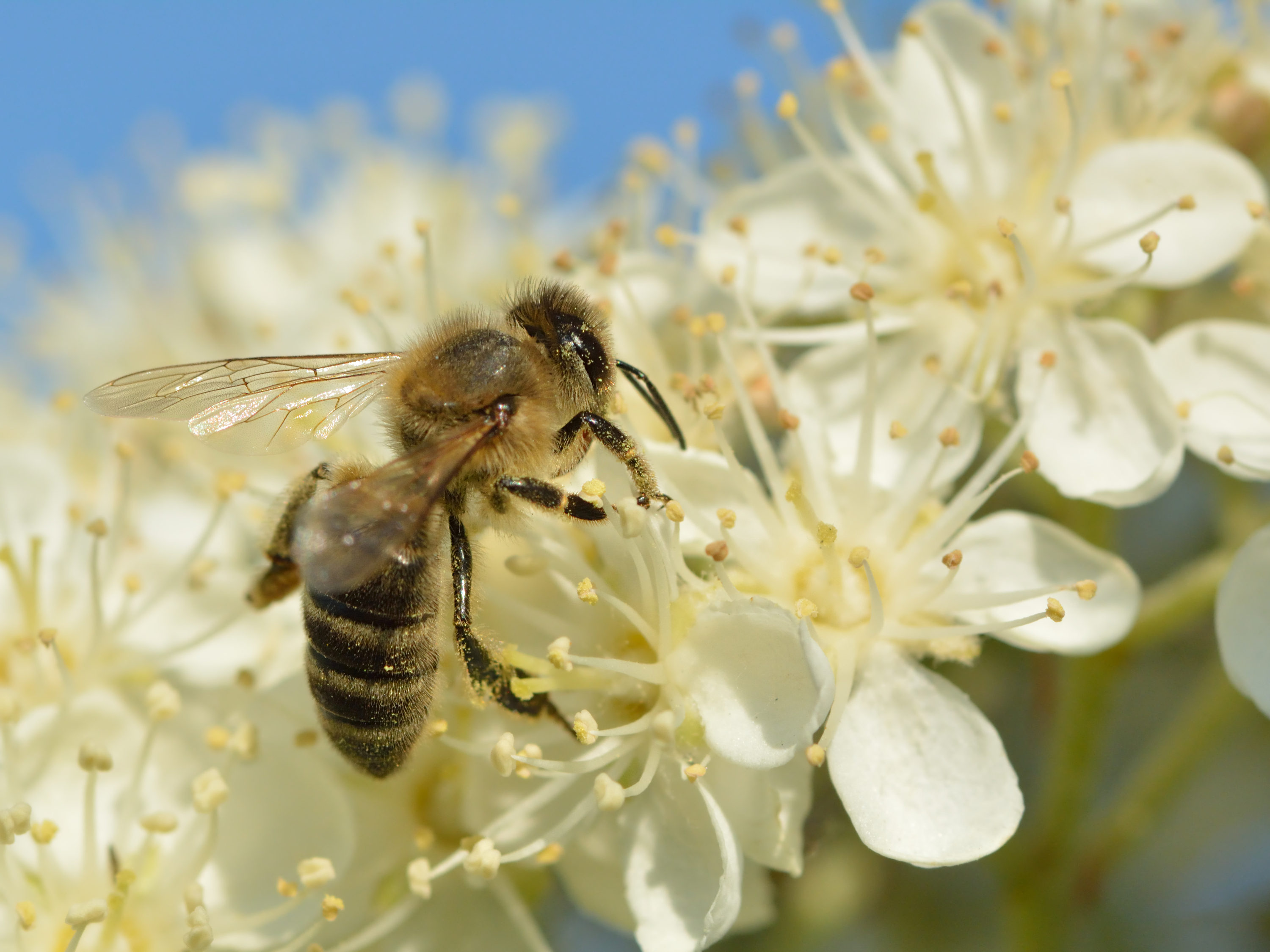
Inflorescence with honeybee

It is a medium-sized deciduous tree growing to 10–20 m (33–66 ft) tall with a stout trunk usually up to 60 cm (24 in), but sometimes as much as 2–3 m (6.6–9.8 ft) in diameter, and grey bark; the crown is dome-shaped, with stout horizontal branches. The leaves are green above, and densely hairy with pale grey-white hairs beneath, 7–12 cm (2.8–4.7 in) long and 5–7 cm (2.0–2.8 in) broad, with four to seven oval lobes on each side of the leaf, broadest near the middle, rounded at the apex, and finely serrated margins. The autumn colour is dull yellowish to grey-brown. The flowers are 15–20 mm (0.59–0.79 in) diameter, with five white petals and 20 yellowish-white stamens; they are produced in corymbs 8–12 cm (3.1–4.7 in) diameter in late spring. The fruit is an oval pome 15 mm (0.59 in) long and 10 mm (0.39 in) in diameter, orange-red to red, maturing in mid autumn. The fruit is dryish, bearing an average of 4.1 seeds per fruit, and eaten by thrushes and waxwings, which disperse the seeds.

Hedlundia intermedia is a triple hybrid between Sorbus aucuparia, Torminalis glaberrima (formerly Sorbus torminalis), and either Aria edulis (formerly Sorbus aria) or one of its close relatives. It is closely related to Hedlundia hybrida (Finnish whitebeam, formerly Sorbus hybrida), another species of hybrid origin, which differs in having the leaves more deeply lobed, with the basal two pairs cut right to the midrib as separate leaflets. Both are tetraploid apomictic species which breed true without pollination.

== Habitat, cultivation and uses ==
In the Nordic countries, the tree typically grows in forests, pastures or forest edges.

It is widely grown as an ornamental tree in northern Europe, valued for its tolerance of urban street conditions; it is very commonly used in avenues and urban parks. It is frequently naturalised in the British Isles. In recent years, much new planting of "Swedish whitebeam" has actually been of the related Hedlundia mougeotii (Vosges whitebeam), another apomictic species from further south in Europe that has more erect branching, less deeply lobed leaves with whiter undersides to the leaves, and darker red fruit.

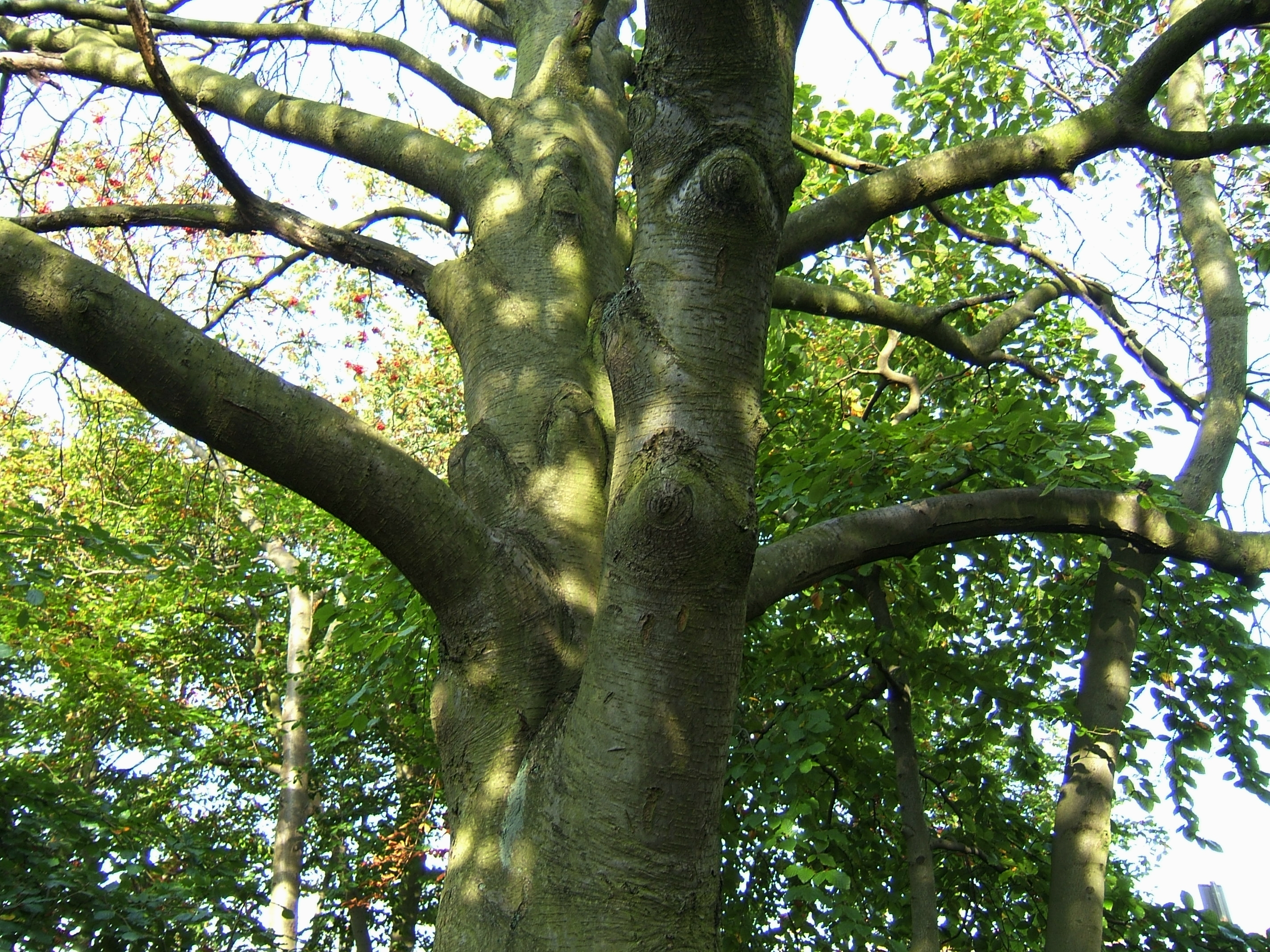
Trunk, showing the stout, nearly horizontal branches

=== Nutrition ===
Fruits average 76.3% water, and their dry weight includes 27.3% carbohydrates and 4.4% lipids.

== Bibliography ==
- Ehrlén, Johan; Eriksson, Ove (1991). "Phenological variation in fruit characteristics in vertebrate-dispersed plants". Oecologia. 86 (4): 463–470. doi:10.1007/BF00318311. ISSN 0029-8549.
- Elwes, Henry John; Henry, Augustine (1906). The Trees of Great Britain & Ireland, volume 1 . Edinburgh: Privately Printed. pp. 159–162 – via Wikisource.
