= Hedlundia velebitica =

Conservation status
- Data Deficient (IUCN 3.1)

Scientific classification
- Kingdom: Plantae
- Clade: Embryophytes
- Clade: Tracheophytes
- Clade: Spermatophytes
- Clade: Angiosperms
- Clade: Eudicots
- Clade: Rosids
- Order: Rosales
- Family: Rosaceae
- Genus: Hedlundia
- Species: H. velebitica

Binomial name
- Hedlundia velebitica (Kárpáti) Sennikov & Kurtto

Synonyms
- Pyrus velebitica (Kárpáti) M.F.Fay & Christenh.; Sorbus velebitica Kárpáti

Species of plant

Hedlundia velebitica is a species of flowering plant in the family Rosaceae. It is a tree endemic to Croatia.
