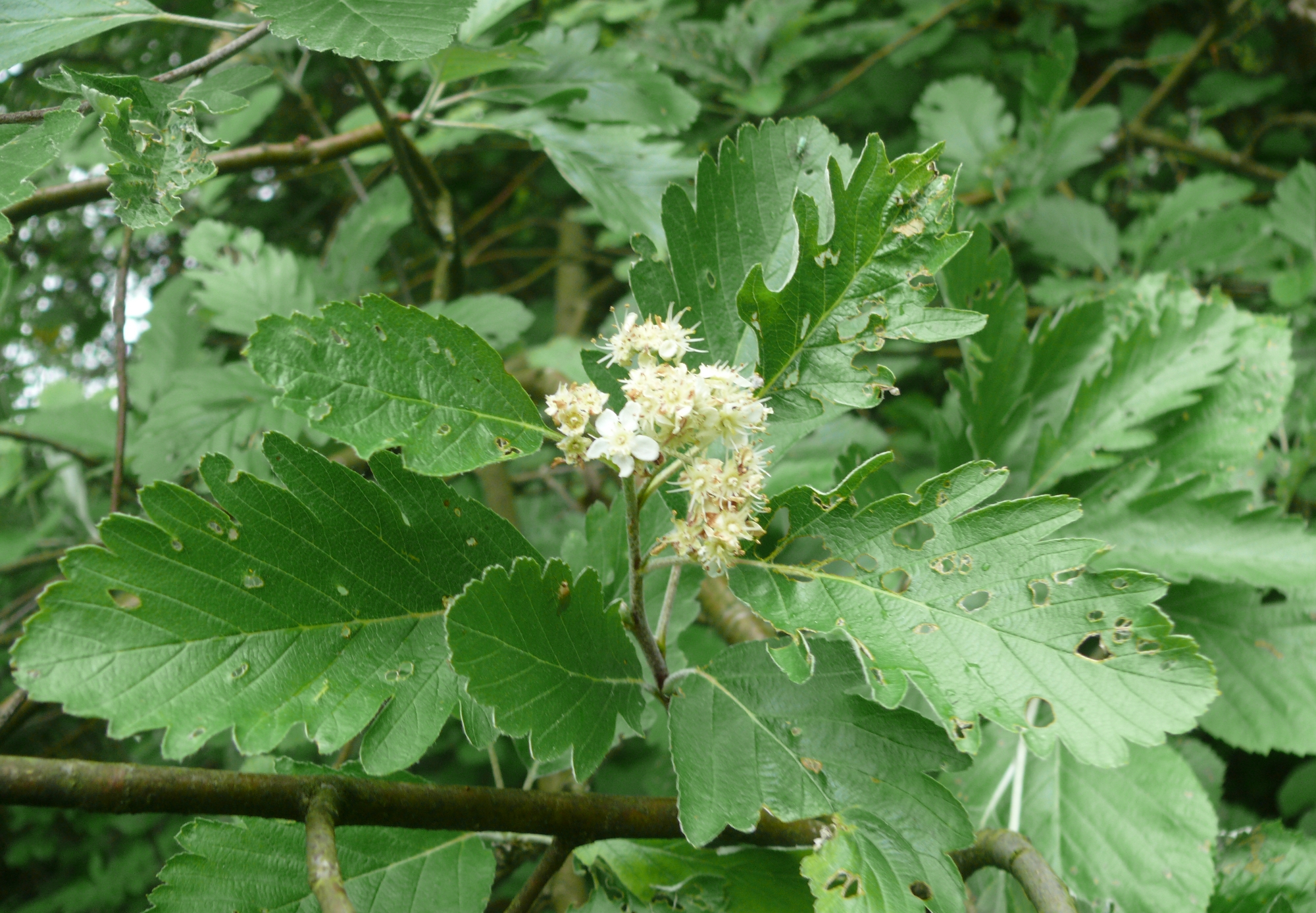
- Sorbus pseudothuringiaca leaves and flowers

Conservation status
- Endangered (IUCN 3.1)

Scientific classification
- Kingdom: Plantae
- Clade: Embryophytes
- Clade: Tracheophytes
- Clade: Spermatophytes
- Clade: Angiosperms
- Clade: Eudicots
- Clade: Rosids
- Order: Rosales
- Family: Rosaceae
- Genus: Hedlundia
- Species: H. pseudothuringiaca

Binomial name
- Hedlundia pseudothuringiaca (Düll) Sennikov & Kurtto

Synonyms
- Pyrus pseudothuringiaca (Düll) M.F.Fay & Christenh.; Sorbus pseudothuringiaca Düll

= Hedlundia pseudothuringiaca =

Species of plant

Hedlundia pseudothuringiaca is a species of flowering plant in the family Rosaceae. It is a small tree endemic to Bavaria in Germany, where it is found growing on rocky or forested areas.
