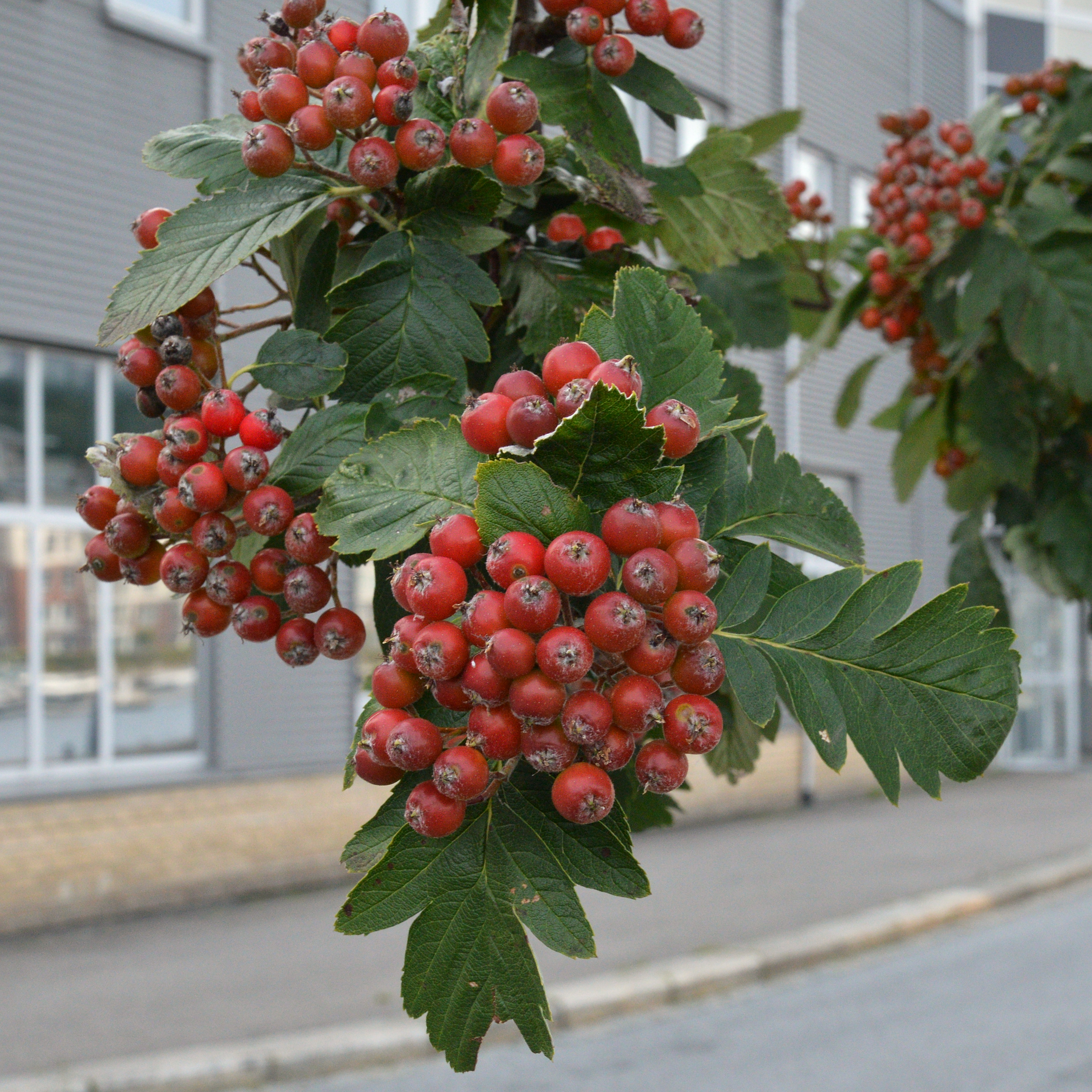

Scientific classification
- Kingdom: Plantae
- Clade: Embryophytes
- Clade: Tracheophytes
- Clade: Angiosperms
- Clade: Eudicots
- Clade: Rosids
- Order: Rosales
- Family: Rosaceae
- Genus: Hedlundia
- Species: H. thuringiaca

Binomial name
- Hedlundia thuringiaca (Nyman) Sennikov & Kurtto

Synonyms
- List: Aria thuringiaca (Nyman) Beck in Fl. Nieder-Österreich 2: 711 (1892); Pyrus firma Osborn in Gard. Chron., ser. 3, 77: 234 (1925); Pyrus pinnatifida Sm. in Engl. Bot. 33: t. 2331 (1812), nom. illeg.; Pyrus pinnatifida var. gibbsii Osborn in Gard. Chron., ser. 3, 77: 234 (1925); Pyrus thuringiaca Ilsein Fl. Mittelthüringen: 99 (1866), not validly publ.; Pyrus thuringiaca (Nyman) Ruhmer in Jahrb. Königl. Bot. Gart. Berlin 1: 232 (1881); Sorbus decurrens (Koehne) Hedl. in Kongl. Svenska Vetensk. Acad. Handl., n.f., 35(1): 48 (1901); Sorbus hybrida f. gibbsii (Osborn) Rehder in Bibliogr. Cult. Trees: 256 (1949); Sorbus hybrida var. gibbsii (Osborn) Bean in Hand-List Trees Shrubs, ed. 4: 317 (1934); Sorbus hybrida var. thuringiaca Nyman in Consp. Fl. Eur.: 241 (1879); Sorbus hybrida var. neuillyensis (Dippel) Cockerell in Amer. J. Sci. 29: 77 (1910); Sorbus neuillyensis Dippel in Handb. Laubholzk. 3: 370 (1893); Sorbus pinnatifida Düll in Ber. Bayer. Bot. Ges. 34: 58 (1961); Sorbus pinnatifida var. decurrens (Koehne) Düll in Ber. Bayer. Bot. Ges. 34: 59 (1961); Sorbus pinnatifida var. quercifolia (Hedl.) Kutzelnigg in G.Hegi, Ill. Fl. Mitt.-Eur., ed. 3, 4(2B): 376 (1995); Sorbus pinnatifida var. thuringiaca (Nyman) Düll in Ber. Bayer. Bot. Ges. 34: 58 (1961); Sorbus quercifolia Hedl. in Kongl. Svenska Vetensk. Acad. Handl., n.f., 35(1): 50 (1901); Sorbus semipinnata var. decurrens (Koehne) Kárpáti in Index Hort. Bot. Univ. Hung. 4: 84 (1940); Sorbus semipinnata var. thruringiaca (Nyman) Kárpáti in Index Hort. Bot. Univ. Hung. 4: 84 (1940); Sorbus thuringiaca (Nyman) Fritsch in A.J.R.Kerner, Sched. Fl. Exs. Austro-Hung. 7: 16 (1896); Sorbus thuringiaca subsp. boscii (Vivant ex Gamisans) Lambinon & Kerguélen in Candollea 43: 406 (1988); Sorbus thuringiaca var. decurrens Koehne in Deut. Dendrol.: 248 (1893); Sorbus thuringiaca var. subaria Rouy & E.G.Camus in G.Rouy & J.Foucaud, Fl. France 7: 20 (1901); Sorbus thuringiaca var. subaucuparia Rouy & E.G.Camus in G.Rouy & J.Foucaud, Fl. France 7: 20 (1901)

= Hedlundia thuringiaca =

Species of flowering plant

Hedlundia thuringiaca (German service-tree; syn. Sorbus × thuringiaca) is a hybrid species of small tree or shrub. It occurs through direct hybridisation between the parents where they occur together, but also produces small amounts of viable seed producing second and subsequent generation hybrids.

== Description ==
It is a small tree growing to 10–15 metres tall, with dull grey bark, which is smooth but begins cracking and flaking as it matures. The leaves are narrowly ovate to elliptic (in shape) 10–15 cm (3.9–5.9 in) long and 6–9 cm (2.4–3.5 in) wide. They are semi-pinnate, lobed, except at the very tip, the lobes become deeper towards the base with the basal one to four pairs of lobes forming separate leaflets, with toothed margins. The leaves are glossy dark green above and grey and hairy underneath. In late spring, it flowers with dense clusters of 5 petaled white flowers, which are 1.2 cm (0.5 in) wide. After flowering, it produces a rounded, bright red berry which is 10–12 mm (0.4–0.5 in) wide.

== Taxonomy ==
It is a diploid hybrid between Sorbus aucuparia and the diploid Aria edulis. It is rare in the wild but occurs at scattered sites across much of Europe (within Austria, Czechoslovakia, France, Germany, Great Britain, Hungary, Ireland, Romania and Switzerland,) and Turkey.

== Cultivation ==
It is often cultivated as an ornamental tree, where it is usually propagated by grafting, including the named cultivars 'Fastigiata' (with erect branches) and 'Leonard Springer' (with larger, 15 mm fruit). It has been introduced in Belgium and Illinois, US.

It was first published in Memoranda Soc. Fauna Fl. Fenn. 93: 34 in 2017.

GRIN (United States Department of Agriculture and the Agricultural Research Service) accepts it as ×Hedlundia thuringiaca (Nyman) Sennikov & Kurtto.
