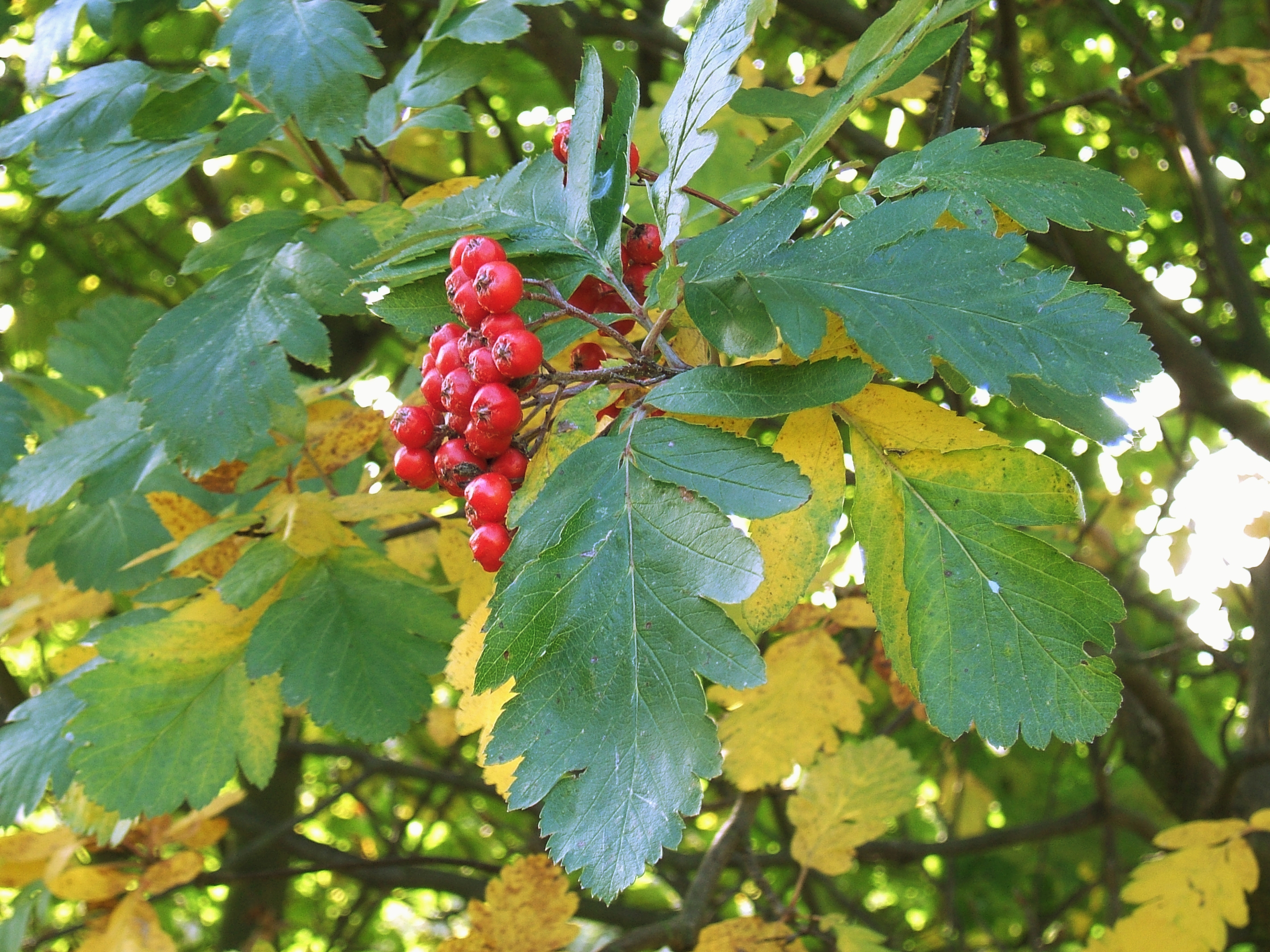
- Foliage and fruit

Conservation status
- Least Concern (IUCN 3.1)

Scientific classification
- Kingdom: Plantae
- Clade: Tracheophytes
- Clade: Angiosperms
- Clade: Eudicots
- Clade: Rosids
- Order: Rosales
- Family: Rosaceae
- Genus: Hedlundia
- Species: H. hybrida

Binomial name
- Hedlundia hybrida (L.) Sennikov & Kurtto

Synonyms
- List: Aria hybrida (L.) Beck; Ariosorbus hybrida (L.) Mezhenskyj; Crataegus hybrida L.; Pyrus hybrida (L.) Sm.; Pyrus semipinnata Roth; Sorbus aucuparia subsp. hybrida (L.) Bonnier & Layens; Sorbus aucuparia var. hybrida (L.) Pers.; Sorbus hybrida (L.) L.; Sorbus semipinnata Hedl.; Sorbus semipinnata eusemipinnata Kárpáti; Aria pinnatifida (Hook.) Lavallée; Azarolus pinnatifida Borkh.; Crataegus aria var. fennica L.; Crataegus fennica Kalm; Crataegus fennica kalmii L.; Hahnia pinnatifida Medik.; Lazarolus pinnatifida Borkh.; Pyrus aria subsp. fennica (Kalm) Syme; Pyrus aria var. pinnatifida Hook.; Pyrus auriculata (Pers.) DC.; Pyrus fennica (Kalm) Bab.; Pyrus pinnatifida Ehrh.; Pyrus pinnatifida var. fastigiata Bean; Pyrus pinnatifidia Borkh.; Pyrus scandica var. fennica (Kalm) Duthie; Pyrus scandica var. pinnatifida Duthie; Sorbus auricula Dippel; Sorbus auriculata Pers.; Sorbus fennica (Kalm) Fr.; Sorbus hybrida f. fastigiata (Bean) Rehder; Sorbus hybrida var. laciniata Lavallée; Sorbus hybrida var. pinnatifida Lavallée; Sorbus hybrida var. superaucuparia Zabel; Sorbus pinnatifida Hartig

= Hedlundia hybrida =

Hybrid species of tree

Hedlundia hybrida (formerly Sorbus hybrida), the Swedish service-tree, Finnish whitebeam, or oakleaf mountain ash, is a species of whitebeam native to Norway, eastern Sweden, south-western Finland, and locally in Latvia.

== Description ==
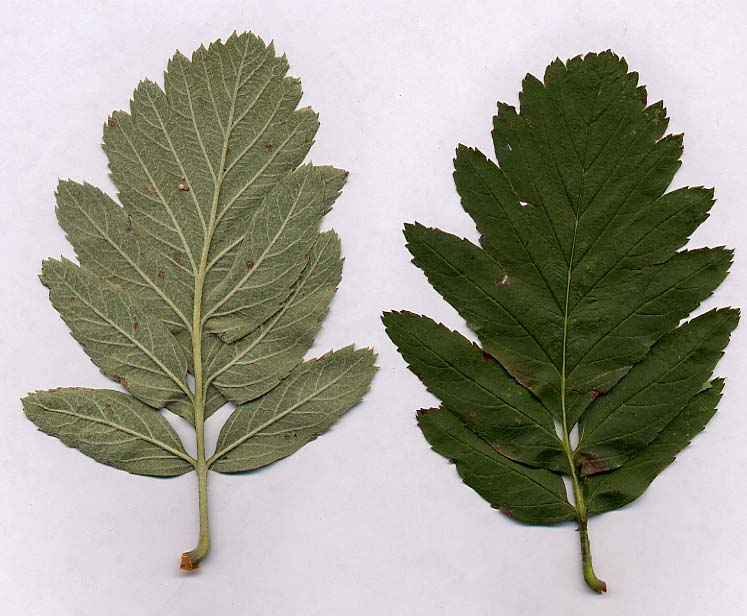
Leaf; under side (left) and upper side (right)

Hedlundia hybrida is a medium-sized deciduous tree growing to 10–15 m (33–49 ft) tall with a stout trunk up to 60 cm (24 in) in diameter, and grey bark. The crown is columnar or conic in young trees, becoming rounded with age, with branches angled upwards. The leaves are green above, and densely hairy with white hairs beneath. 7–12 cm (2.8–4.7 in) long and 5–8 cm (2.0–3.1 in) broad, the leaves are lobed, with six to nine oval lobes on each side of the leaf. These lobes are broadest near the base with the two basal pairs of lobes cut right to the midrib as separate leaflets, rounded at the apex, with finely serrated margins. The autumn colour is dull rusty brown. The flowers are 20 mm (0.79 in) in diameter, with five white petals and 20 yellowish-white stamens; they are produced in corymbs 6–11 cm (2.4–4.3 in) in diameter in late spring. The fruit is a globose pome 7–12 mm (0.28–0.47 in) in diameter, bright red, maturing in mid-autumn. The fruit is succulent, and eaten by thrushes and waxwings, which disperse the seeds.

== Taxonomy ==
It is a tetraploid species of hybrid origin between the European rowan (Sorbus aucuparia) and the Swedish whitebeam (Scandosorbus intermedia), the latter being a tetraploid triple hybrid between S. aucuparia, the wild service tree (Torminalis glaberrima), and the common whitebeam (Aria edulis) or one of its close relatives. S. intermedia differs from H. hybrida in having the leaves less deeply lobed with no separate leaflets. Closely related Hedlundia meinichii is a triploid or tetraploid species of hybrid origin between H. hybrida and S. aucuparia and differs in having the basal four to six pairs of lobes cut right to the midrib as separate leaflets. All three polyploid species are apomictic species which breed true without pollination.

== Cultivation ==
Hedlundia hybrida is grown as an ornamental tree in northern Europe, and is locally naturalised in the British Isles. The cultivar 'Gibbsii' has gained the Royal Horticultural Society's Award of Garden Merit.
