= Botanischer Garten der Universität Regensburg =

Botanical garden in Bavaria, Germany

Coordinates: 48.9932°N 12.0915°E

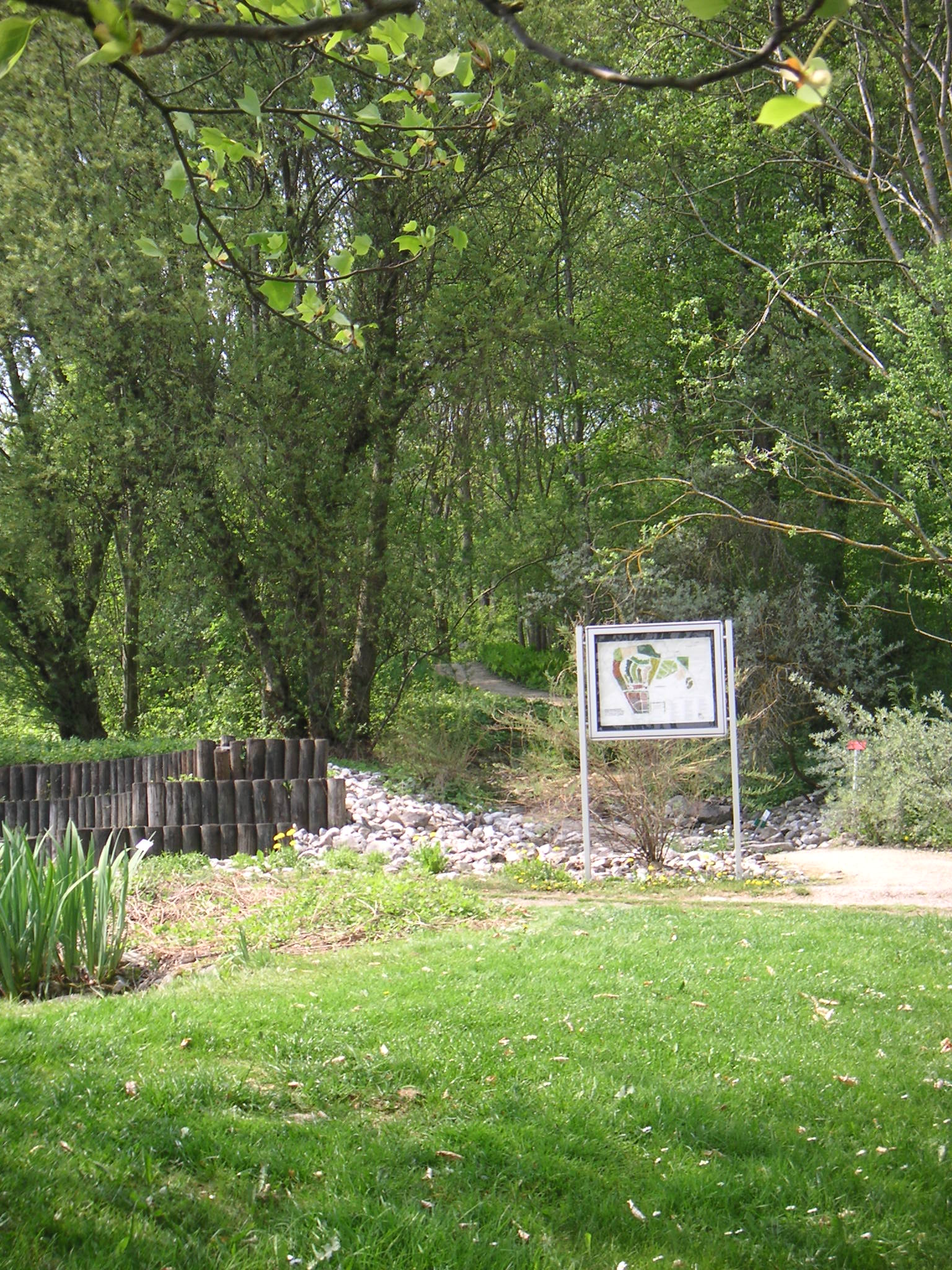
Botanischer Garten der Universität Regensburg

The Botanischer Garten der Universität Regensburg is a botanical garden maintained by the University of Regensburg on campus at Universitätsstraße 31, Regensburg, Bavaria, Germany. It comprises 4.5 hectares (11 acres). The garden is open daily except Saturday in the warmer months.

The garden was established in 1977 at the southern edge of the university campus. It consists of a number of different sections, including:

- Alpine plant garden
- Aquatic plants
- Endangered plants of Bavaria
- Floodplains and swamp collection
- Geographic collection (4000 m^{2}), containing about 800 species from the American continents, Asia, and Europe
- Medicinal plant garden
- Oak-birch forest
- Systematic collection

The garden maintains specialist collections of the following genera: Erythronium (18 species), Polygonatum (30), indigenous Rosa (25), indigenous Rubus (70), Sorbus (30), Tricyrtis (14), and Trollius (10). Some collections are open to the public. It also contains four greenhouses (total area 450 m^{2}) with collections of ferns, bromeliads and orchids; carnivorous plants and crops from temperate climates; rainforest plants and tropical crops; cactus and succulents.

The garden is linked with a herbarium established in 1790 by the Regensburg Botanical Society, which has been associated with the university since 1973. As of 2002 the herbarium contained 1,350 fascicles with 122,358 specimens.

== See also ==
- List of botanical gardens in Germany
