= Botanical Garden Erlangen =

Botanical garden in Franconia, Germany

Coordinates: 49.5992°N 11.0066°E

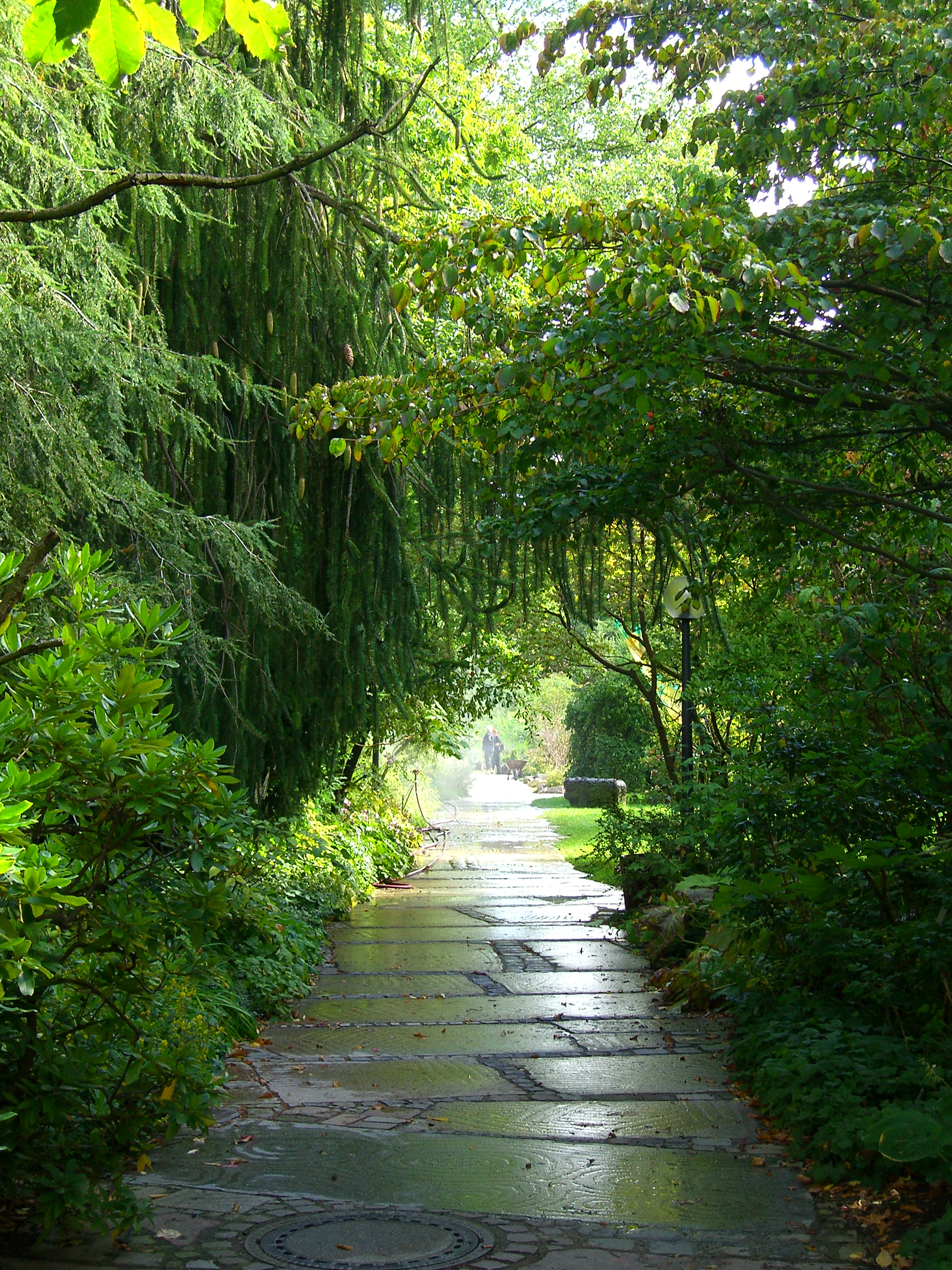
Botanical Garden Erlangen

The Botanical Garden Erlangen (German: Botanischer Garten Erlangen) is a botanical garden, which is 2 hectares in size, maintained by the University of Erlangen-Nuremberg and located on the north side of the castle garden in the city center at Loschgestraße 3, Erlangen, Franconia, Germany. It is open daily except Monday.

The garden's origins date back to 1626 when the hortus medicus was established in Altdorf bei Nürnberg. In 1747 the first botanical garden in Erlangen was established in front of the former Nuremberg Gate, and since 1828 the botanical garden has been established at its current location.

Today the garden contains about 4,000 species representing a wide range of plants of different climates, including those maintained within greenhouses (about 1700 m^{2}). The garden also contains Neischl Grotto, an artificial cave renovated in May 2008. The Herbarium Erlangense is a herbarium containing about 158,000 records from around the world.

== See also ==
- List of botanical gardens in Germany
