= Goravan Sands Sanctuary =

Protected area in Armenia

Goravan Sands Sanctuary (Armenian: Գոռավանի ավազուտներ արգելավայր, romanized: Gorravani avazutner argelavayr) is a state protected area in Ararat Province, Armenia.

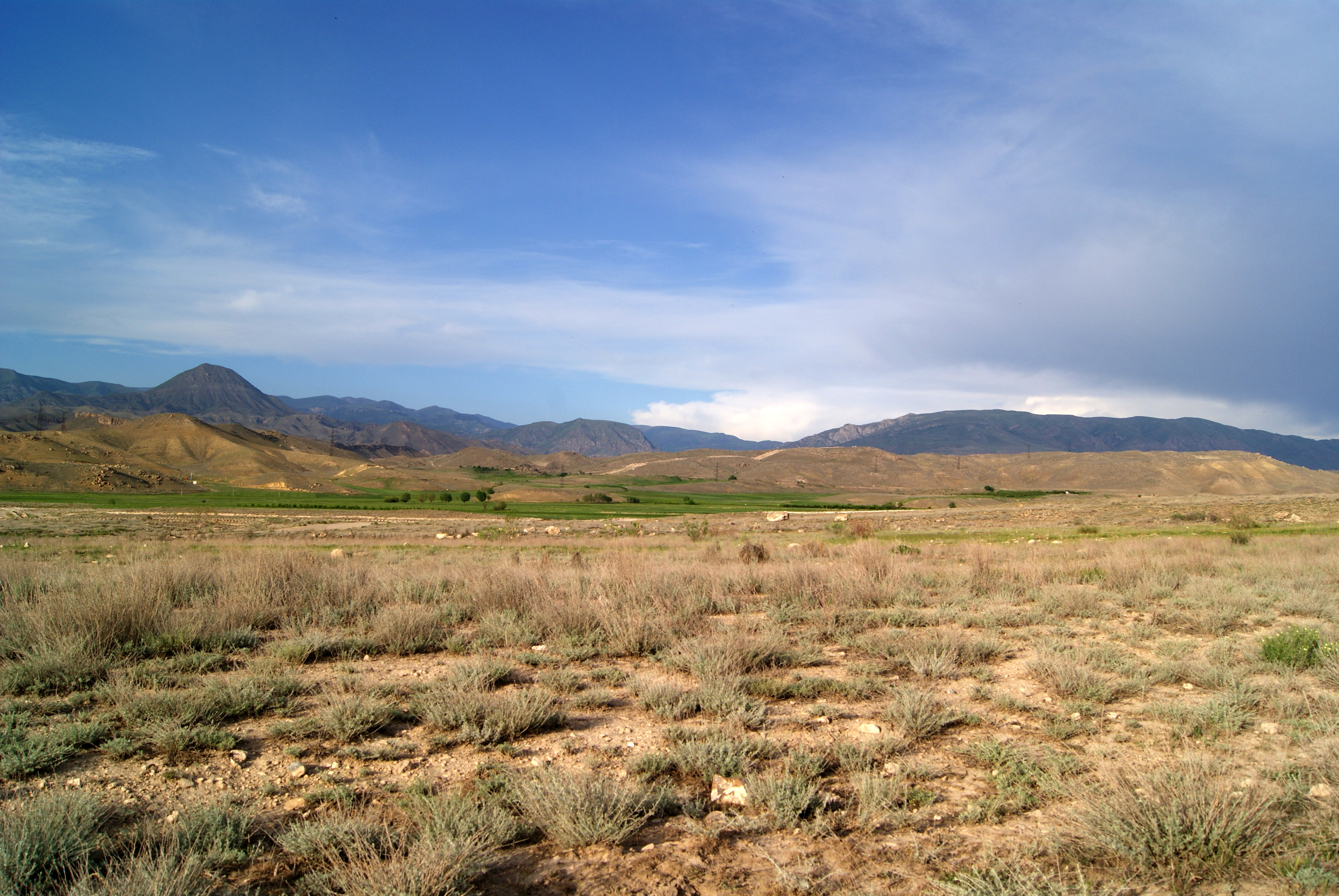
Goravan Sands Reserve

== General information ==
The Goravan Sands Sanctuary is a protected nature area within the Ararat Province of Armenia. The reservation was established by the government of the former Armenian Soviet Republic in 1959 in order to protect the unique flora and fauna of the largest (about 200 ha) known residual of sandy semideserts in Armenia. This reservation is a home for about 160 species of vascular plants, at least 36 species of vertebrate animals (Tadevosyan, 2001, 2002), as well as numerous lower plants, fungi, lichens, and invertebrates which were not summarised in the literature yet. The reservation supports a number of plant and animal species included into the Red List of Armenia, as well as 4 species included into the 2011 edition of the IUCN Red List. Conservation regimen of the reservation has many similarities to those of IVth of the IUCN Protected Area Management Categories. This means that the area being generally open to recreational and educational use, should be well controlled in order to prevent and manage landscape and habitat changing activities including melioration, reclamation and mining, as well as abuse of natural resources including flora and fauna or their certain representatives through overgrazing and over-collection of eatable wild plants, etc. However, expert surveys performed in 1998-2008 (Tadevosyan, 2001-2006) show that due to the lack of control and even a formal administration, the land of the reservation was intensively used in very different ways including grazing (whole area), sand and travertine mining (few spots), dumping (several spots), military training using numerous heavy vehicles (few spots), agriculture (few spots) and uncontrolled and often illegal collection of wild plants and animals including rare and endangered species. The reservation is listed as an area of National Priority in "Biodiversity of Caucasus Ecoregion (2001), as well as in the WWF's list of Caucasus Biodiversity Hotspots. Therefore, there is a hope that changes still can be made in order to save this unique residual ecosystem.

== Location ==
The Goravan Reservation is situated on the predominantly North-West facing dry piedemonts of the Urtz mountain ridge. Due to the lack of management historically boundaries of the reservation were not well defined and some discrepancies about the position of the reservation have been documented (Tadevosyan, 2001-2006). One may imagine a landscape of the reservation as a half of a broken plate partly buried in the sand. From the North and the West sandy habitats clearly limited by the village of Goravan with its cemetery, fields, fruit and vegetable plantations. On the South and East Sandy paths create a complex mosaic with dry tan limestone ridges, and the boundary of the reservation in these directions is not defined. The original governmental decision of 1959, and a number of publications cited that document state that the Goravan State Nature Reservation covers 200 ha of sandy desert adjacent to the Goravan village at 900–950 m above sea level. However, the most recent field surveys and analysis of LandSat satellite images demonstrate existence of more than 10 patches of sandy semi-desert with total area of only 175 hectares and situated between 894 and 1060 m above sea level (Tadevosyan, 2005, 2006a,b) (see map at ). Trials to obtain an original map showing boundaries of the reservation failed. Therefore, it is still unknown whether this discrepancy a result of a different delineation of the boundaries of the reservation in 1959, an approximation or uncertain measurements used in the governmental decision of 1959, historical changes in land use, or from the one or more factors acting together. Conservation of sandy habitats has been formulated a primary goal of the reservation in 1959. However field work done in 1998-2005 show that surrounding rocklands have their own conservation value, which somewhat exceeds that of sandy habitats. Rocky slopes support a number of critical wildlife species which are absent from the sandy habitats, or disappeared from sandy habitats but preserved in rocklands. Either way there is a need in re-determination of the boundaries of the reservation.

== Climate ==
The Goravan State Nature Reservation is situated within the arid climate zone. It is considered as a desert ecosystem with cold winters. Average annual precipitation is 200–300 mm; average annual air temperature is +12 °C, Absolute minimum is -25 °C, absolute maximum is 42 °C. The duration of freeze free period is approximately 200–220 days. Winter starts in the second decade of November and end in the first decade of March. Depth of the snow cower 100–280 mm. Average temperature in January is - 4 °C. Spring is pretty short (from March to the 2nd decade of May) and dry with cool nights and hot days. An average monthly precipitation in the spring is about 10–15 mm, and an average air temperature is 26 °C. Summer is dry and hot. Fall starts at the third decade of September and ends until the 2nd decade of November. The most humid periods are November–February and then April–May (Baghdasarian et al., 1971).

== Landscape and habitats ==
The landscape of the reservation is very mosaic. Sandy deposits which are the core of the reservation along with tertiary clayey deposits historically arose in Pleistocene over the bed-rock - a Paleozoic limestone (Ararat Travertine). Later tectonic movements along with constant water and wind erosion of the bed rock adding even more complexity in the structure of the landscape (Baghdasarian et al., 1971, Tadevosyan, 2001). Sandy habitats of the reservation remained a pretty large and wide ash-grey shore-line, thought there are no seas or lakes around. Presence of diatomite shelves in the sand is an evidence of its lacustrine or marine origin. Today, the closest water body is the river Vedi, which is intermittent in its lower flow, and usually dries out every summer. It is situated within almost 900 meters from the reservation and separated from it by the road and a wide line of agriculture lands. Within the reservation there are no other water bodies except for a few small ephemeral springs at the bottom of the deepest limestone canyons.

Different types of ground and distance from the water source determine different composition of biodiversity (Tadevosyan, 2001; 2002). Limestone rocks and their outcrops were found to be richest in diversity of vascular plants (102 species) and vertebrate animals. Habitats of spring beds support just some of the majority of plant and animal species. Rocks of different size and position on the surface of the ground create a kind of shell which protects the soil from fast and deep drying, the plants from losing humidity and relatively heavy-bodied vertebrate animals from overheating and from predators. The characteristic vegetation of this habitat is called phryganoids. Here one can encounter very dryness resistant (xerophylic) relatives of woody plants like Pallass's buckthorn (Rhamnus pallasii), white-hair cherry (Prunus incana), dragon-head sage (Salvia dracocephaloides), as well as relatively large animals which need reliable permanent shelters such as fox, Armenian tortoise (Testudo graeca armeniaca), West Asian blunt nosed viper (Macrovipera lebetina obtusa), golden grass skink (Heremites auratus), and Caucasian agama (Paralaudakia caucasia). Many of organisms inhabiting rocky outcrops critically need rock cover for protection from predators, incubation and hibernation. Therefore, extensive travertine mining in the neighbourhoods of the reservation carries a serious threat to the biodiversity of rocklands.

Artemisia semi-desert is the most characteristic habitat of the whole arid zone, where the reservation is situated. Artemisia semidesert supports extremely dry-resistant and heat-resistant generalist species. Here one can encounter associations of Artemisia fragrans with different saltworts (Salsola species).

- Habitat of Tertiary Clay Semi-desert; is pretty narrow spread, and usually associated with rocky outcrops. This habitat is poor in biodiversity, It supports a number of saltworts, as well as the endemic plant Scorzonera gorovanica and beautiful fritillaria (Fritillaria gibbosa).
- Humid habitats around streams and urban lands; look like a green oases. These habitats support some diversity of Tamarix species, different wild and domesticated crops, as well as amphibians and striped lizards.
- "Sandy Desert/Semi-desert Habitats"; support very specific psammophilic organisms. Many of psammophilic organisms are very sensitive to changes in depth and mechanical composition of the soil.

== Flora ==
The reservation supports about 160 species of vascular plants from 125 genera and 39 families (Tadevosyan, 2001, 2002). This diversity includes 12 Red List species: Dianthus libanotis (Caryophyllaceae), Salsola tamamschjanae (Chenopodiaceae), Calligonum polygonoides (Polygonaceae), Acantholimon araxanum (Plumbaginaceae), Astragalus massalskyi, Astragalus paradoxus (Fabaceae), Thesium szowitsii (Santalaceae), Neogaillonia szowitsii (Rubiaceae), Phlomoides macrophylla (Lamiaceae), Fritillaria gibbosa, Tulipa biflora (Liliaceae), Iris iberica subsp. lycotis (Iridaceae).

The gems of the sandy habitat are phog (Calligonum polygonoides), milfoil (Achillea tenuifolia), spurge, Bassia prostrata, Noaea mucronata, Euphorbia marschalliana, Astragalus paradoxus, Ziziphora tenuior, Ceratocarpus arenarius, Oligochaeta divaricata and numerous other psammophyte species.

'Sands of Goravan is the only place in Armenia where relict phog (Calligonum polygonoides), and Fritillaria gibbosa occur. It is a leafless perennial shrub with dense white and green branches up to 1m long. Its roots are important for preventing sand movement. Phog is ecologically tied to one of endemic insect species of Armenia occurring in Goravan sands - Pharaonus caucasicus butterfly. Local people collecting roots and branches of the phog and use it as fuel. Also phog is intensively grazed by domestic goat and sheep.

Another notable species is the milfoil (Achillea tenuifolia) which usually grows up to 80 cm. This species is very common for xerophyte associations of the Ararat plain, particularly in sandy semi-desert. Native communities collect milfoil and use it for preparation of food. Milfoil is usually surrounded by numerous ant hills. Ants are vitally tied to this as well as other sand species. Links between ants and myrmecophilous species (Euphorbia marschalliana, Oligochaeta divaricata, Ziziphora tenuior, and Ziziphora persica) are not yet fully understood.

The Goravan reservation supports a number of other wild plants in use by local peoples including several species of wild onions (Allium), Scorzonera, fragrant representatives of the mint family (Lamiaceae), and edible representatives of the carrot family (Apiaceae).

== Fauna ==
Goravan State Reservation also supports about 36 species of vertebrate animals from 33 genera and 27 families (Tadevosyan, 2001), as well as various invertebrates. Seven species included into the National Red List: Horvath's sun-watcher lizard (Phrynocephalus horvathi), Persian toad-headed agama (Phrynocephalus persicus de Filippi, 1863) (Agamidae), Transcaucasian racerunner (Eremias pleskei) (Lacertidae), Schneider's skink (Eumeces schneideri), golden grass skink (Heremites auratus) (Scincidae), Armenian tortoise (Testudo graeca armeniaca) (Testudinidae), trumpeter finch (Bucanetes githagineus) (Fringillidae), Dahl's jird Meriones dahli (Gerbillinae).

The reptile fauna of the sanctuary is most well studied. It includes at least 13 species from 12 genera and 7 families.

3 relatively large lizard species: Caucasian mountain agama (Laudakia caucasia), grass skink (Heremites auratus) and Shneider's skink (Eumeces schneideri) are linked to rock outcrops, which protect them from predators and overheat. Overage sized Strauch's racerunner (Eremias strauchi) is a kind of habitat generalist, which can be encountered among rock outcrops, as well as the sand, clay and hard brown soils. The snake-eyed lizard (Ophisops elegans) uses stony habitats. Two other small sized lizards Phrynocephalus persicus and Eremias pleskei are specifically linked to sandy habitats and their closest neighborhoods. Within sandy habitats 3 lizard species (P. persicus, E. strauchi and E. pleskei) partition their resources through differences in thermobiology, food preferences, hunting strategies and microhabitat use. Humid habitats of streams, as well as urban lands support Caucasus emerald lizard (Lacerta strigata)

== Existing threats ==
Sandy semidesert, which is the most unusual habitat type of the Goravan reservation is gradually shrinking due to overgrazing, mining and reclamation of neighbouring lands. Sand mining destroys habitats of Calligonum polygonoides, Phrynocephalus horvathi, Eremias pleskei and Testudo graeca. Travertine mining destroys habitats of Fritillaria gibbosa, Testudo graeca, Eumeces schneideri, Trachylepis septemtaeniatus etc. Overgrazing impacts Calligonum polygonoides, a number of ephemeroids including Fritillaria gibbosa, double flower tulip (Tulipa biflora), wolf iris (Iris lycotis), various wild anions (Allium ssp.) etc., as well as small vertebrates like Phrynocephalus horvathi and juvenile Testudo graeca, who may get traumatised or even killed under the feet of multiple head herds of domestic sheep and goats, idly scattering the area of the reservation in all directions. Uncontrolled collection impacts Calligonum polygonoides, Phrynocephalus persicus, Testudo graeca. Road mortality affects Phrynocephalus persicus, Eremias pleskei and Testudo graeca. Irrigation destroys habitats of almost all xerophilic species.
