= Aria sudetica =

- Flowering branch of Aria sudetica

Conservation status
- Endangered (IUCN 3.1)

Scientific classification
- Kingdom: Plantae
- Clade: Tracheophytes
- Clade: Angiosperms
- Clade: Eudicots
- Clade: Rosids
- Order: Rosales
- Family: Rosaceae
- Genus: Aria
- Species: A. sudetica

Binomial name
- Aria sudetica (Tausch) Beck
- It is endemic to the Krkonoše Mountains of the Czech Republic and Poland

Synonyms
- List: × Chamaearia sudetica (Tausch) Mezhenskyj; Chamaemespilus sudetica (Tausch) M.Roem.; Majovskya sudetica (Tausch) Sennikov & Kurtto; Pyrus chamaemespilus proles sudetica (Tausch) Asch. & Graebn.; Pyrus sudetica Tausch; Sorbus aria var. sudetica (Tausch) Heynh.; Sorbus chamaemespilus subsp. sudetica (Tausch) Nyman; Sorbus chamaemespilus var. sudetica (Tausch) Wenz.; Sorbus sudetica (Tausch) Bluff, Nees & Schauer; Chamaemespilus pseudaria (Spach) M.Roem.; Crataegus pseudaria Spach; Sorbus erubescens A.Kern.; Sorbus hostii var. pseudaria (Spach) Briq.; Sorbus pseudaria (Spach) Hedl.; Sorbus sudetica var. fatrae Borbás

Species of tree in the family Rosaceae

Aria sudetica, the Sudetan whitebeam, is a facultatively apomictic species of shrub in the family Rosaceae native to Poland and the Czech Republic. It is believed to have become extinct in Poland. It originated by hybridisation of Aria chamaemespilus and Aria edulis after the last ice age, approximately 22000–12000 years ago.

== Description ==
Flowering branch of Aria sudetica

=== Vegetative characteristics ===
Aria sudetica bud

Aria sudetica is a deciduous, 0.3–3 m tall shrub with smooth, brownish-grey bark. The ovoid-conical, glabrous buds are pointed. It reproduces vegetatively through creeping branches. The simple, broadly oval or obovate to obovate-elliptic, 6–7 cm long, and 3–4.5 cm wide leaves with an irregularly serrated margin have 7–9 pairs of lateral veins. The dark green adaxial leaf surface is glabrous and the abaxial leaf surface is tomentose. The petiole is short.

=== Generative characteristics ===
The relatively sparse, terminal, compact, corymbose, 4–6 cm wide inflorescence with tomentose or glabrescent branches bears pink, actinomorphic flowers. Up to 22 inflorescences are produced per individual shrub. The 5 obovate petals are pinkish-red. The calyx lobes are pointed to acuminate. Viable pollen grains are 20–28 μm wide, and the smaller, unviable pollen grains are 14–20 μm wide. The syncarpic gynoecium is composed of 2(–3) carpels. The ovary is semi-inferior. Each loculus has 2 ovules, of which frequently only one develops into a seed. The 2(–3) free styles have flat stigmas. The red, 10–13 mm long, globose, glossy, red pome has a persistent calyx. The endocarp is cartilaginous. The seeds are teardrop-shaped. Flowering occurs from June until August.

=== Cytology ===
The chromosome count is 2n = 4x = 68. It is tetraploid. The 2C genome size is 2407.4 Mbp. The genomic GC content is 39.9 %. It has an extremely low genetic diversity.

== Taxonomy ==
It was first described as Pyrus sudetica Tausch by Ignaz Friedrich Tausch in 1834. It was moved to the genus Aria (Pers.) J.Jacq. ex Host as Aria sudetica (Tausch) Beck by Günther Beck von Mannagetta und Lerchenau in 1892. The species arose through hybridisation, probably in the early Holocene, where it emerged after the last ice age, approximately 22000–12000 years ago, when Aria chamaemespilus and Aria edulis occurred together, but it now grows in absence of its parental species. It is facultatively apomictic. The type specimen was collected by Tausch in the Krkonoše Mountains, Czech Republic.

=== Etymology ===
The specific epithet sudetica refers to the Sudetenland of former Czechoslovakia.

== Distribution and habitat ==
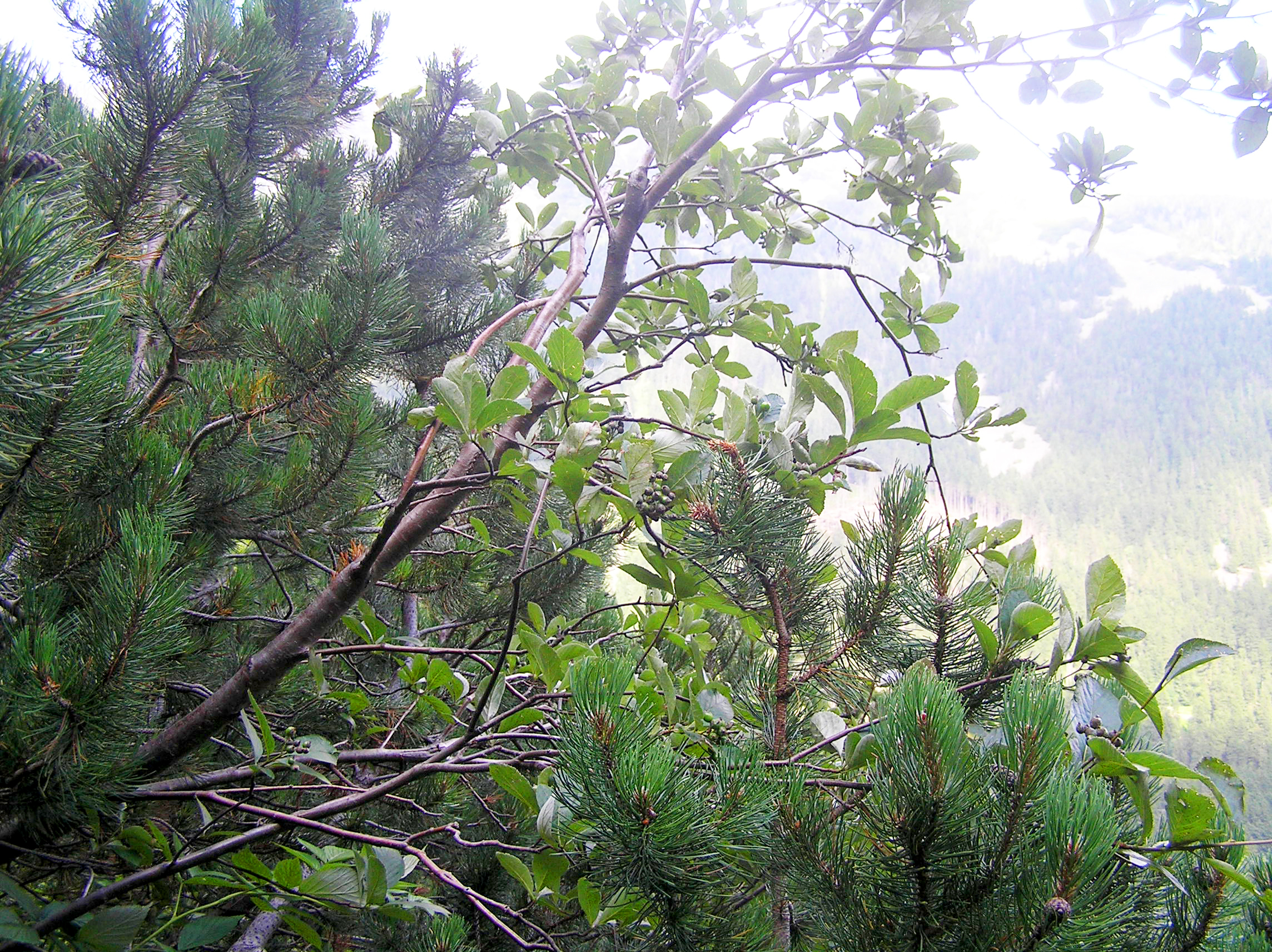
Aria sudetica growing in the Krkonoše Mountains, Czech Republic

Aria sudetica is endemic to the Krkonoše Mountains, of the Czech Republic, and Poland, but it is believed to have become extinct on the Polish side. It occurs in a small area of 20 km^{2} growing in grassland communities, in avalanche paths, and on slopes without competition from Norway spruce at high elevations of 1050–1350 m above sea level. It grows on shallow, calcium-deficient skeletal soils, as well as on humus-rich soils on both silicate and basic substrates. In areas where avalanches occur, it grows as a low, creeping shrub. It grows in absence of its parental species. Reports from Spain belong to Aria × ambigua.

== Ecology ==
The flowers are pollinated by insects.

== Conservation ==
It is an endangered species with a small, declining population of only 100 mature shrubs in two subpopulations which consist of ten localities. In the national Red List of the Czech Republic from 2017, it is categorised as a C1b – critically threatened taxon, which is rare and declining. It is protected by law. It is threatened by being outcompeted by spruce or pine trees, and by grazing deer. It is also threatened by cliff falls or avalanches. It is cultivated in several ex situ conservation collections in botanic gardens.

== Uses ==
It may be planted as an ornamental plant in gardens.
