= Pyrus alpina =

Pyrus alpina may refer to two different plant species:

- Pyrus alpina Willd., a synonym for Aria edulis
- Pyrus alpina (Mill.) Du Roi, a synonym for Chamaemespilus alpina
