= Aria × ambigua =

- Flowering Aria × ambigua in the Reykjavík Botanic Garden

Scientific classification
- Kingdom: Plantae
- Clade: Tracheophytes
- Clade: Angiosperms
- Clade: Eudicots
- Clade: Rosids
- Order: Rosales
- Family: Rosaceae
- Genus: Aria
- Species: A. × ambigua

Binomial name
- Aria × ambigua Michalet ex Decne.
- It is native to southwestern and central Europe

Synonyms
- List: × Chamaearia ambigua (Michalet ex Decne.) Mosyakin & McNeill; Chamaemespilus × ambigua (Michalet ex Decne.) Gren.; Hahnia × hostii var. ambigua (Michalet ex Decne.) Dippel; Majovskya × ambigua (Michalet ex Decne.) Sennikov & Kurtto; Pyrus × ambigua (Michalet ex Decne.) Michalet ex Beck; Sorbus × ambigua (Michalet ex Decne.) Beck; Sorbus chamaemespilus subsp. ambigua (Michalet ex Decne.) Nyman; Sorbus × ambigua Michalet; Sorbus × ambigua var. glabrescens Michalet

Species of tree in the family Rosaceae

Aria × ambigua, is a species of tree native to southwestern and central Europe. It is a natural hybrid of Aria chamaemespilus and Aria edulis.

== Description ==
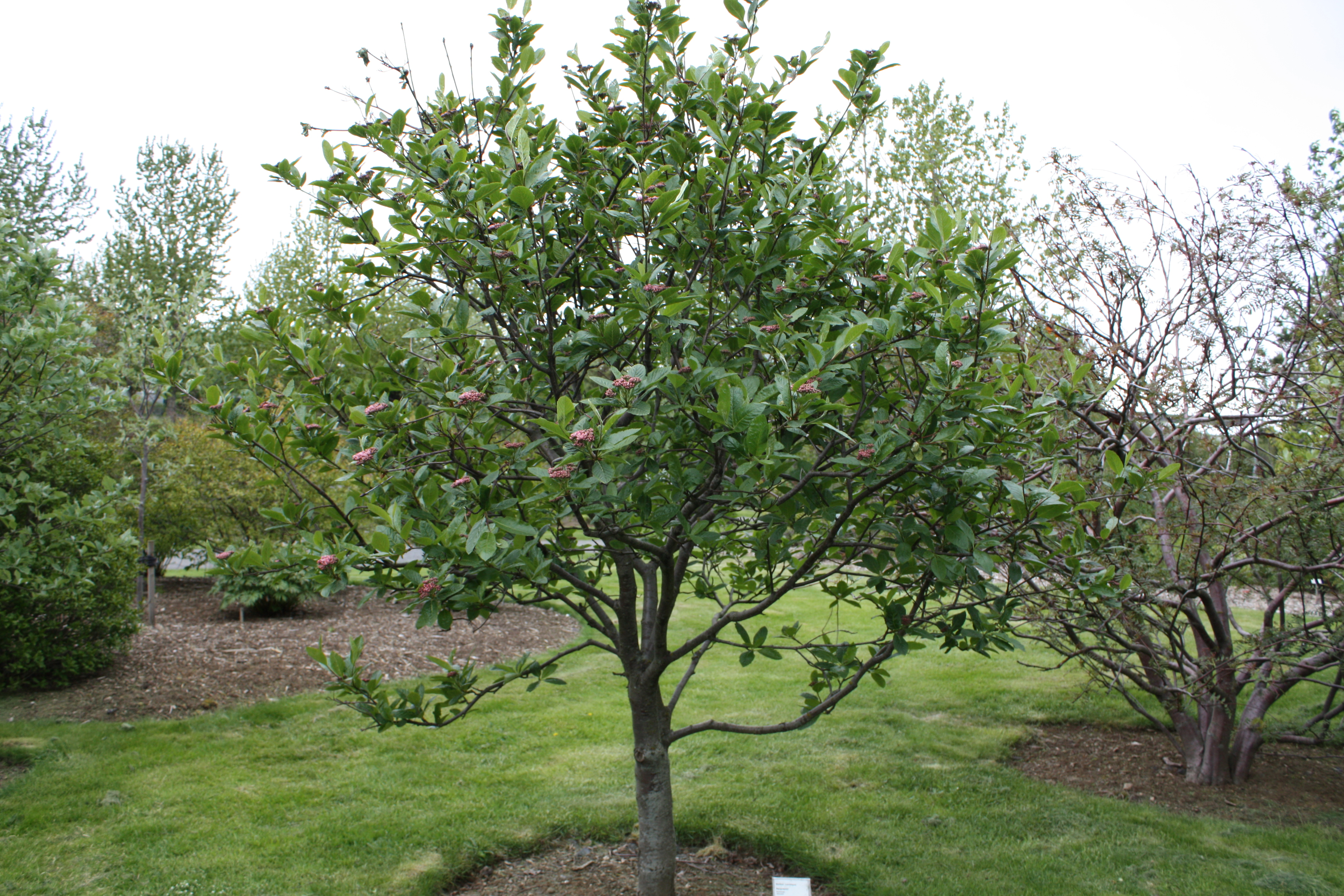
Flowering Aria × ambigua in the Reykjavík Botanic Garden

Abaxial leaf surface of Aria × ambigua foliage

Aria × ambigua inflorescence

=== Vegetative characteristics ===
Aria × ambigua is a tree. The abaxial leaf surface is only slightly pubescent.

=== Generative characteristics ===
Seeds are produced sexually and not by apomixis.

=== Cytology ===
The chromosome count is 2n = 2x = 34. It is diploid.

== Taxonomy ==
It was described by Joseph Decaisne in 1874. The lectotype was collected on the 24 June 1856 by Michalet in Switzerland.

=== Etymology ===
The specific epithet ambigua means doubtful.

== Distribution and habitat ==
It is native to Austria, Czech Republic, France, Germany, Poland, Spain, Switzerland where it occurs across the Alps, Carpathian Mountains, and Pyrenees mountain ranges
