= Crataegus alpina =

Crataegus alpina may refer to two different plant species:

- Crataegus alpina Gray, a synonym for Aria edulis
- Crataegus alpina Mill., a synonym for Chamaemespilus alpina
