= Sorbus carpatica =

Sorbus carpatica may refer to two different plant species:

- Sorbus carpatica (Soó) Kárpáti, a synonym for Aria edulis
- Sorbus carpatica Andrz., a synonym for Chamaemespilus alpina
