= Aria zuzanae =

Conservation status
- Data Deficient (IUCN 3.1)

Scientific classification
- Kingdom: Plantae
- Clade: Tracheophytes
- Clade: Angiosperms
- Clade: Eudicots
- Clade: Rosids
- Order: Rosales
- Family: Rosaceae
- Genus: Aria
- Species: A. zuzanae

Binomial name
- Aria zuzanae (Májovský & Bernátová) Mosyakin, Fedor. & McNeill
- It is endemic to the Veľká Fatra mountain range, Slovakia

Synonyms
- Majovskya zuzanae (Májovský & Bernátová) Sennikov & Kurtto; Pyrus zuzanae (Májovský & Bernátová) M.F.Fay & Christenh.; Sorbus zuzanae Májovský & Bernátová

Species of tree in the family Rosaceae

Aria zuzanae is an apomictic species of shrub in the family Rosaceae endemic to the Veľká Fatra mountain range, Slovakia.

== Description ==
=== Vegetative characteristics ===
Aria zuzanae is a small, 0.5–3 m tall shrub. with entire, unlobed leaves.

=== Generative characteristics ===
The flowers are pink.

=== Cytology ===
It is triploid.

== Taxonomy ==
It was first described as Sorbus zuzanae Májovský & Bernátová by Jozef Májovský and Dana Bernátová in 2003. It was moved to the genus Aria (Pers.) J.Jacq. ex Host as Aria zuzanae (Májovský & Bernátová) Mosyakin, Fedor. & McNeill by Sergei Leonidovich Mosyakin, Mykola Mykhaylovych Fedoronchuk, and John McNeill in 2025. The type specimen was collected on the 8 June 1993 by Májovský and Bernátová on the Skalná Alpa mountain in the Veľká Fatra mountain range at an altitude of 1450 m above sea level. Aria zuzanae is believed to be a result of the hybridisation of Aria chamaemespilus and Aria edulis. It may have more than one origin and may have resulted from bidirectional hybridisation, as more than one chloroplast DNA haplotype was found for this species. Aria zuzanae has some novel traits that are not intermediate between its parental species. It is morphologically distinct fromAria haljamovae, but it is hard to distinguish between Aria zuzanae and Aria haljamovae on the genetic level.

=== Etymology ===
The specific epithet zuzanae honours Zuzanae Hegedüšová.

== Distribution and habitat ==
It is endemic to the Carpathian Mountains of Slovakia, where it occurs in an area of 734 km^{2} across the Vel'ká Fatra Mountains, Krivánska Fatra Mountains, the Skalná Alps, and the Nízke Tatry, where it grows in dwarf pine scrub on limestone.

== Conservation ==
Aria zuzanae is a data deficient species lacking information on its population, the population trend, or threats. In the Red List of vascular plants of the Carpathian part of Slovakia and in the Carpathian Red List of Forest Habitats and Species, it is categorised as vulnerable (VU). It isn't cultivated in any ex situ conservation collections.
