= Psammophile =

Organism that prefers or thrives in sandy areas

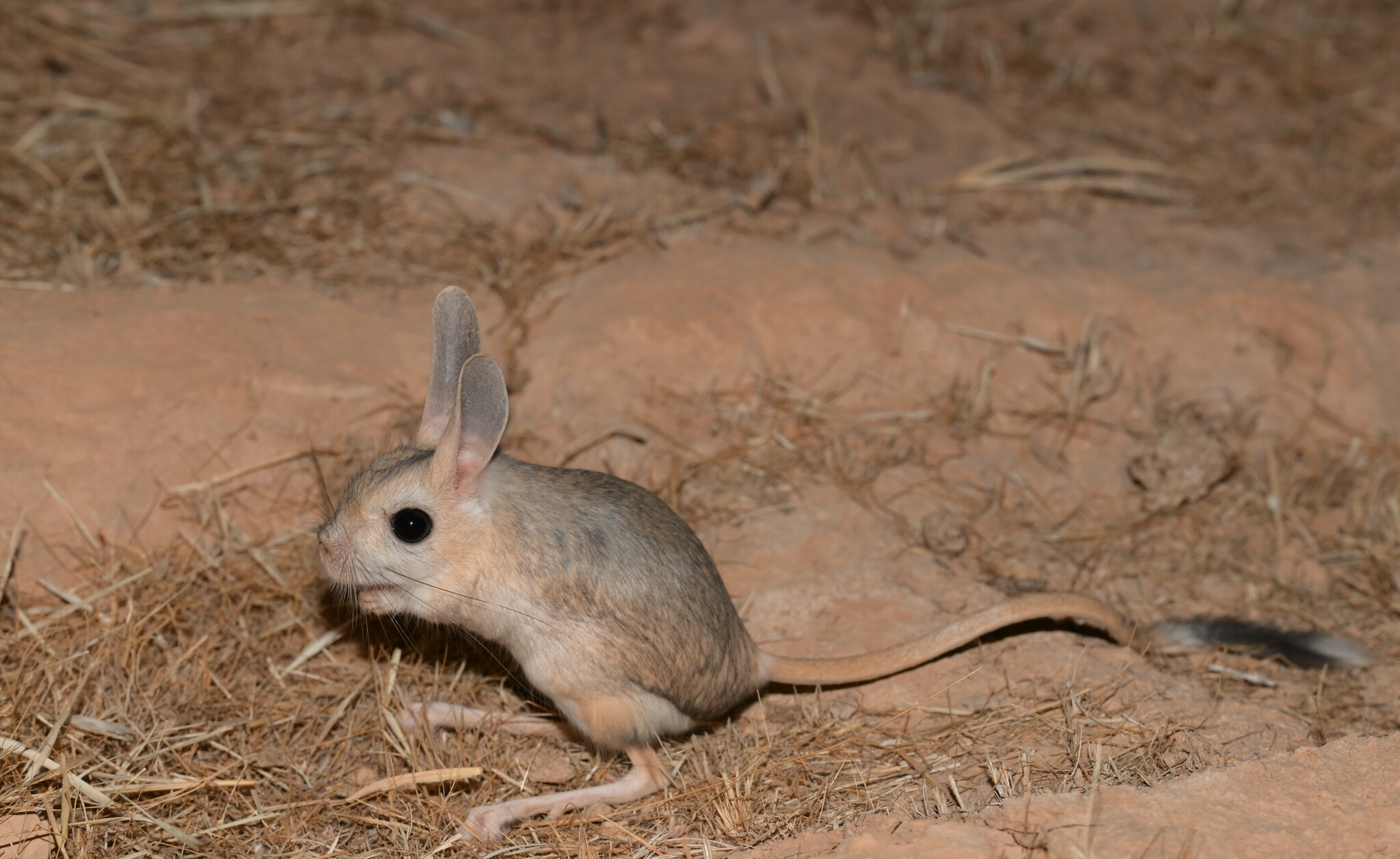
Jerboas are well adapted to living in sandy areas

A psammophile (/ˈ(p)sæmoʊfaɪl/ (P)SAM-oh-fyle) is a plant or animal that prefers or thrives in sandy areas. Plant psammophiles are also known as psammophytes. They thrive in places such as the Arabian Peninsula, the Sahara and the dunes of coastal regions.

Because of the unique ecological selective pressures of sand, animals on opposite sides of the planet can convergently evolve similar features, a phenomenon sometimes referred to as ecomorphological convergence. The Crotalus cerastes native to American deserts and the Bitis peringueyi native to Namibian deserts have independently evolved sidewinding behavior to traverse across sand. Similarly, the African jerboa and the American kangaroo rat have separately evolved a bipedal form with large hind legs that allow them to hop.

== Etymology ==
Psammo is from Ancient Greek ψάμμος (psámmos, “sand”); -philo is from Ancient Greek φίλος (phílos, “dear, beloved”) via Latin -phila.

== Popular culture ==
With the correct spelling of the word psammophile, Florida eighth-grader Dev Shah, one of 231 contestants, won the 95th Scripps National Spelling Bee in June 2023 and was awarded $50,000 in prize money.

== See also ==
- Extremophile
- Psammophyte
