= Goravan =

Village in Ararat, Armenia

Goravan Գոռավան
- Location within Armenia Location within Ararat
- Coordinates: 39°54′N 44°44′E
- Country: Armenia
- Province: Ararat
- Municipality: Vedi

Population (2011)
  - Total: 2,430
- Time zone: UTC+4
  - Summer (DST): UTC+5

Goravan (Armenian: Գոռավան), is a village in the Vedi Municipality of the Ararat Province of Armenia, just south of the Vedi river, which separates the town of Vedi from Goravan.

== Nature ==
Goravan state nature reservation is located in the vicinity of Goravan village.
