= Laugardalur =

Coordinates: 64.142°N 21.866°W

- District
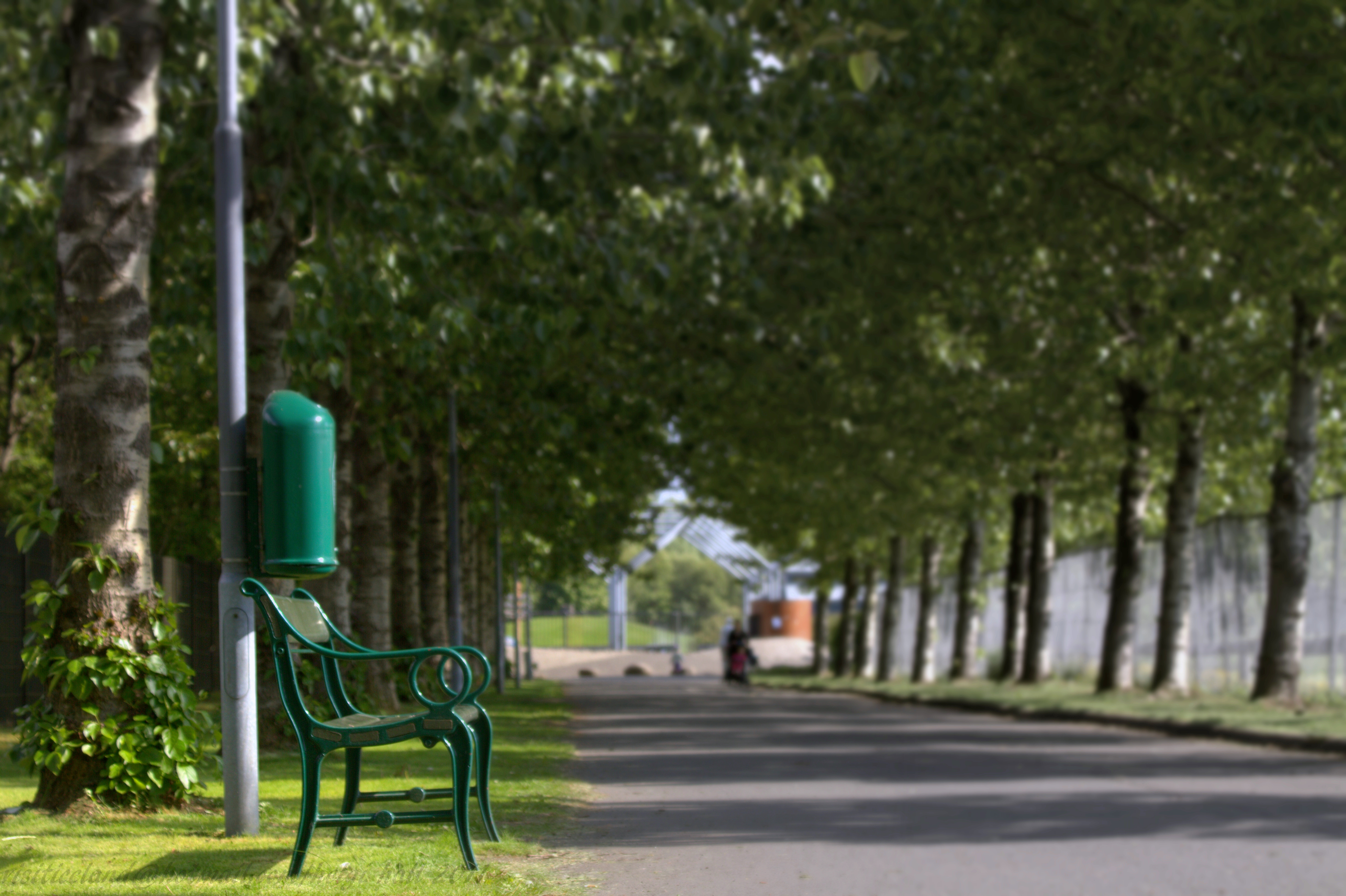

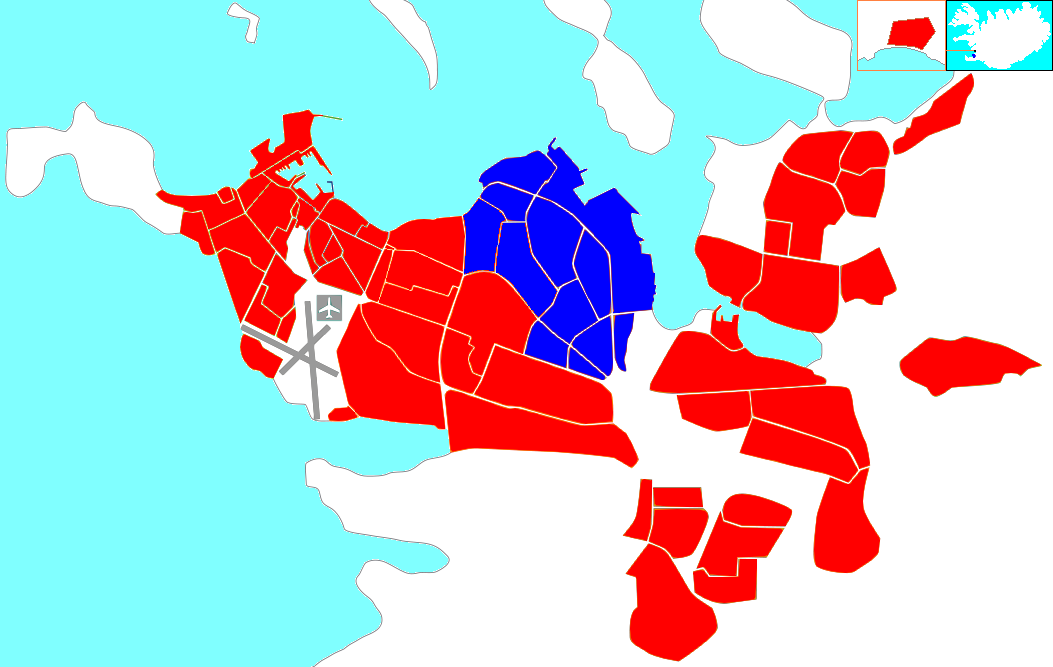
- Country: Iceland
- Municipality: Reykjavík

Area
  - Total: 6.4 km^{2} (2.5 sq mi)

Population (2010)
  - Total: 15,000
  - Density: 2,300/km^{2} (6,100/sq mi)
- Postal code: IS-104

Laugardalur (Icelandic pronunciation: [ˈlœyːɣarˌtaːlʏr̥]) is a district of Reykjavík, the capital of Iceland. It is just east of the city centre and contains various recreational facilities including the public thermal baths and largest swimming pool complex, Laugardalslaug, the national stadium Laugardalsvöllur, the Laugardalshöll concert and sports hall, Laugardalur Ice Rink, Reykjavík Botanic Garden, and the Reykjavík Park and Zoo. The name means "hot spring valley" (literally translates to "pool valley"), as washing laundry was once done in geothermal hot springs there until the 1930s.

== See also ==
- Reykjavík Botanic Garden
