= Psammophyte =

Type of plant that grows in sandy soil

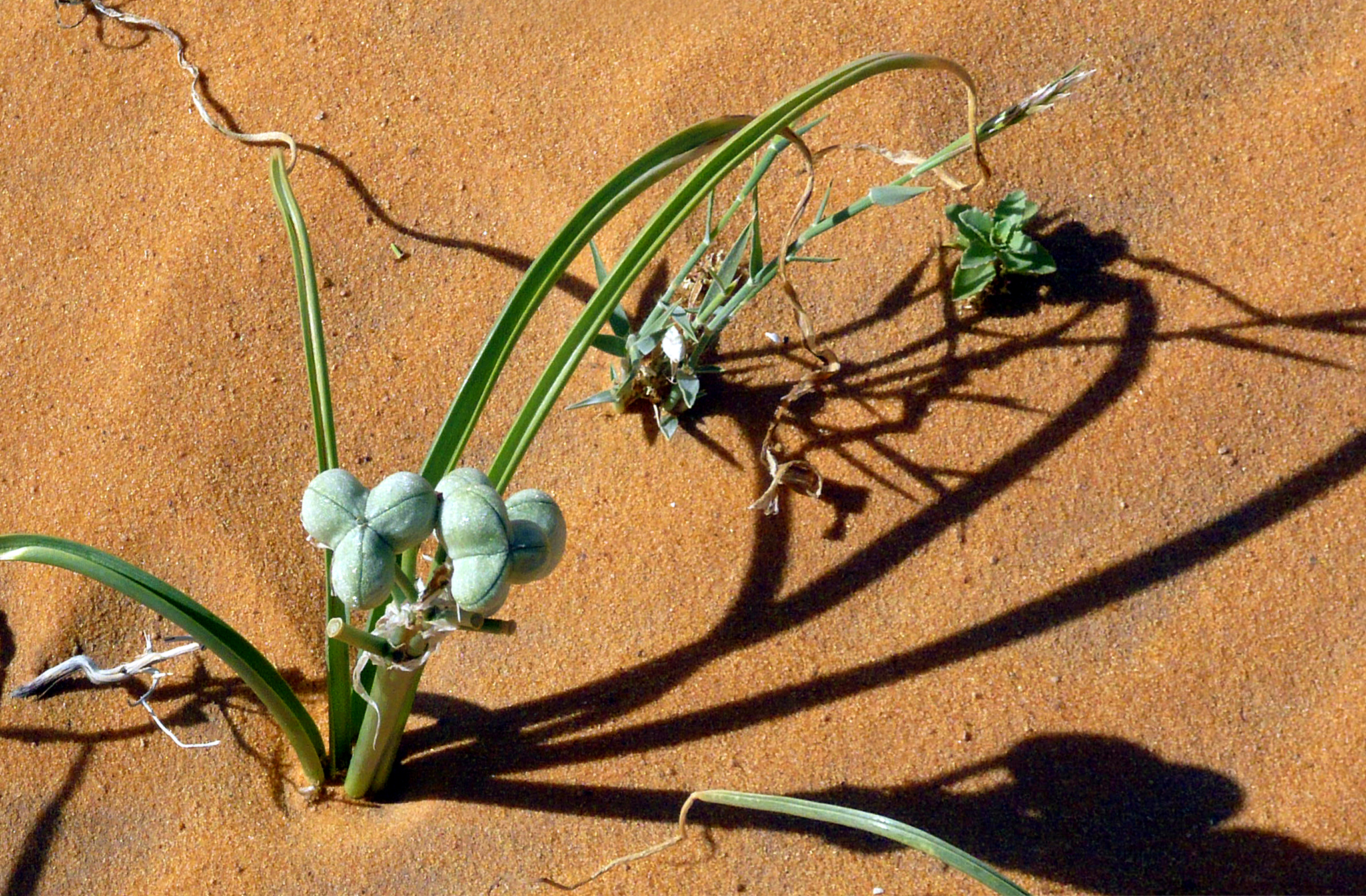
Psammophytes of three different species in the Sahara desert

A psammophyte is a plant that grows in sandy and often unstable soils. Psammophytes are commonly found growing on beaches, deserts, and sand dunes. Because they thrive in these challenging or inhospitable habitats, psammophytes are considered extremophiles, and are further classified as a type of psammophile.

== Etymology ==
The word "psammophyte" consists of two Greek roots, psamm-, meaning "sand", and -phyte, meaning "plant". The term "psammophyte" first entered English in the early twentieth century via German botanical terminology.

== Description ==
Psammophytes are found in many different plant families, so may not share specific morphological or phytochemical traits. They also come in a variety of plant life-forms, including annual ephemerals, perennials, subshrubs, hemicryptophytes, and many others. What the many diverse psammophytes have in common is a resilience to harsh or rapidly fluctuating environmental factors, such as shifting soils, strong winds, intense sunlight exposure, or saltwater exposure, depending on the habitat. Psammophytes often have specialized traits, such as unusually tenacious or resilient roots that enable them to anchor and thrive despite various environmental stressors. Those growing in arid regions have evolved highly efficient physiological mechanisms that enable them to survive despite limited water availability, similar to those in other xerophytes.

== Distribution and habitat ==
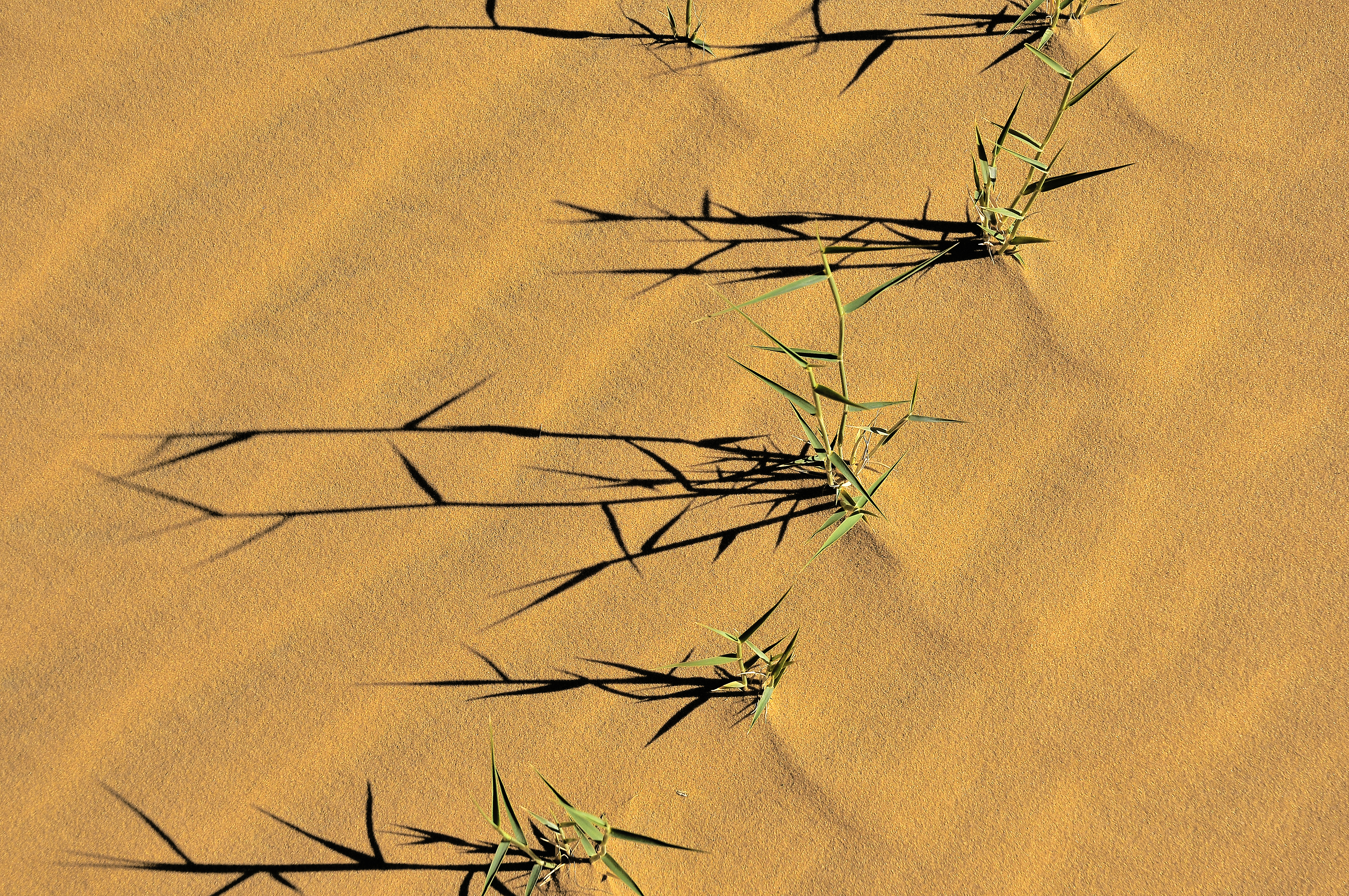
Grass family psammophytes of the Sahara desert in Algeria

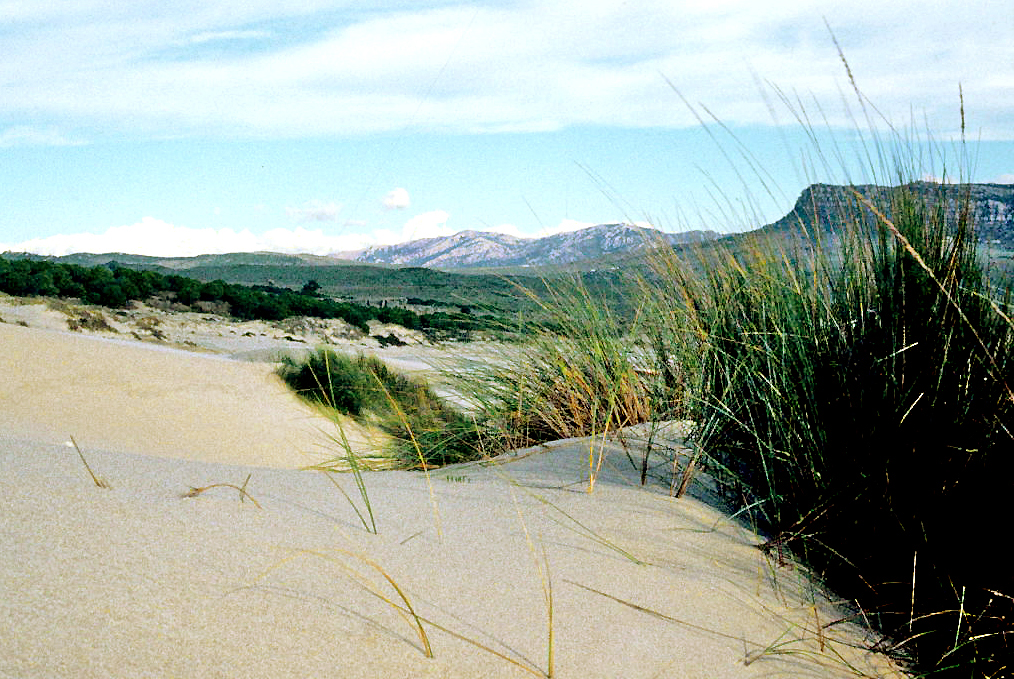
Psammophytes growing in sand drifts at Duna de Bolonia in Tarifa, Spain

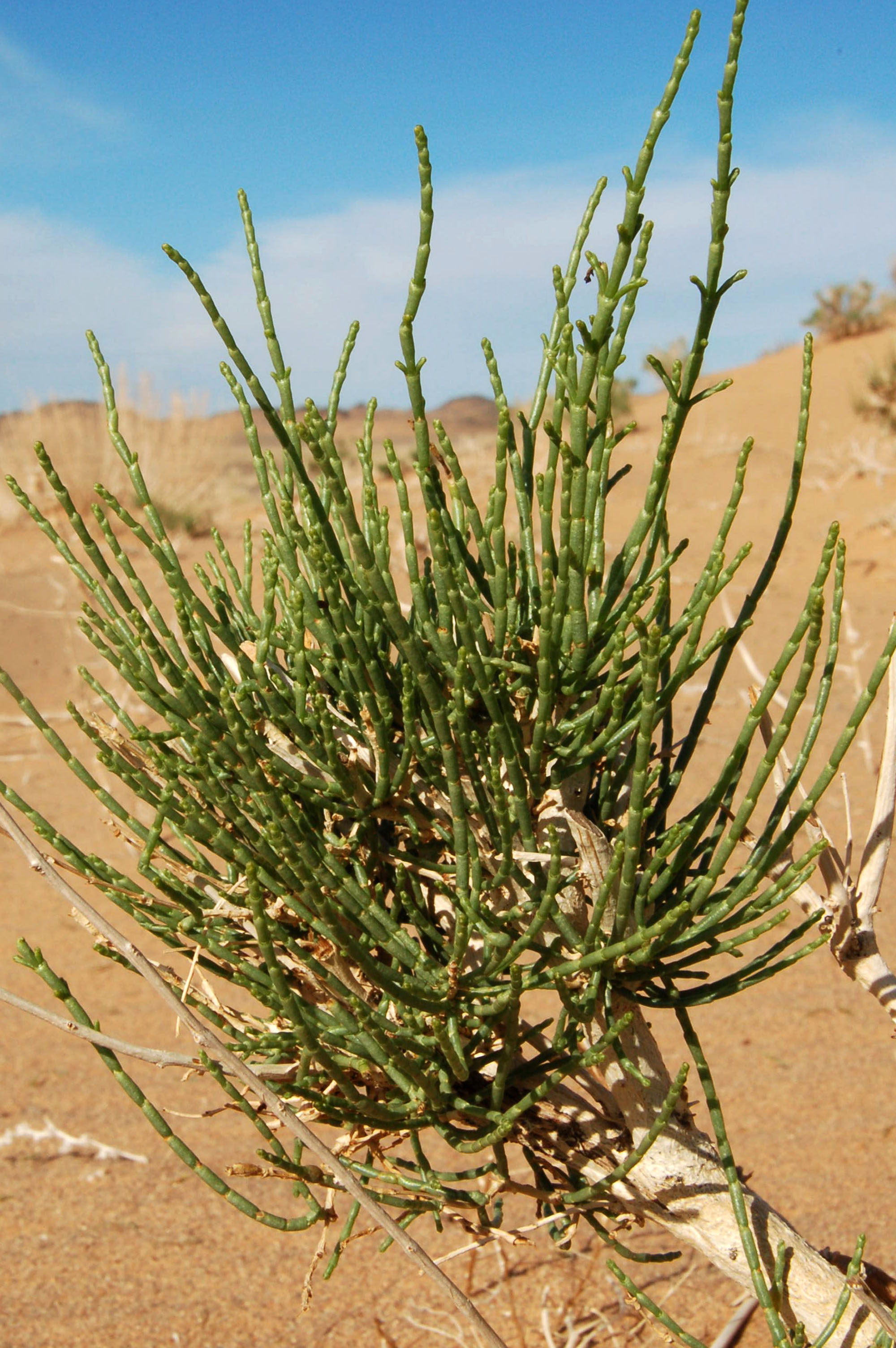
Haloxylon ammodendron, Mongolian psammophyte

Psammophytes grow in regions all over the world and can be found on sandy, unstable soils of beaches, deserts, and sand dunes. In China's autonomous Inner Mongolia region, psammophytic woodlands are found in steppe habitats.

== Ecology ==
Psammophytes often play an important ecological role by contributing some degree of soil stabilization in their sandy habitats. They can also play an important role in soil nutrient dynamics. Depending on the factors at play at a given site, psammophyte communities exhibit varying degrees of species diversity. For example, in the dunes of the Sahara Desert, psammophyte communities exhibit limited diversity and are predominantly made up of plants from the grass and mustard families.

Like many other types of plants, psammophytes can have symbiotic relationships with microorganisms called endophytes that live inside of their tissues, which can impart enhanced growth or other benefits.

== Conservation ==
A major threat to psammophytes in many regions is dune destabilization, which is exacerbated by human development projects and factors associated with climate change, such as drought and temperature increases. Encroachment of non-psammophytic plants and invasive species poses another threat to psammophyte species in some areas. Ecological restoration efforts in psammophyte habitats often aim to utilize the natural soil stabilizing and nutrient enhancement abilities of psammophytes as part of restoration strategies. Another important strategy is restoring and protecting the requisite soil microbiome some psammophytes require to thrive.

China's Minqin Garden of Desert Plants is one organization that is actively working on efforts to conserve both wild and horticultural psammophyte species.

== Examples ==
Some examples of psammophyte species include:

- Agriophyllum squarrosum (sand rice)
- Haloxylon ammodendron (saxaul)
- Linaria arenaria (sand toadflax)
- Omphalodes kuzinskyanae (Kuzinsky navelwort)
- Stipagrostis pungens (madjiugu)
- Corynephorus canescens (grey hair-grass or gray clubawn grass)
- Plantago arenaria (branched plantain, sand plantain, or black psyllium)

== See also ==
- Extremophile
- Goravan Sands Sanctuary
- Psammophile
- Xerophyte
