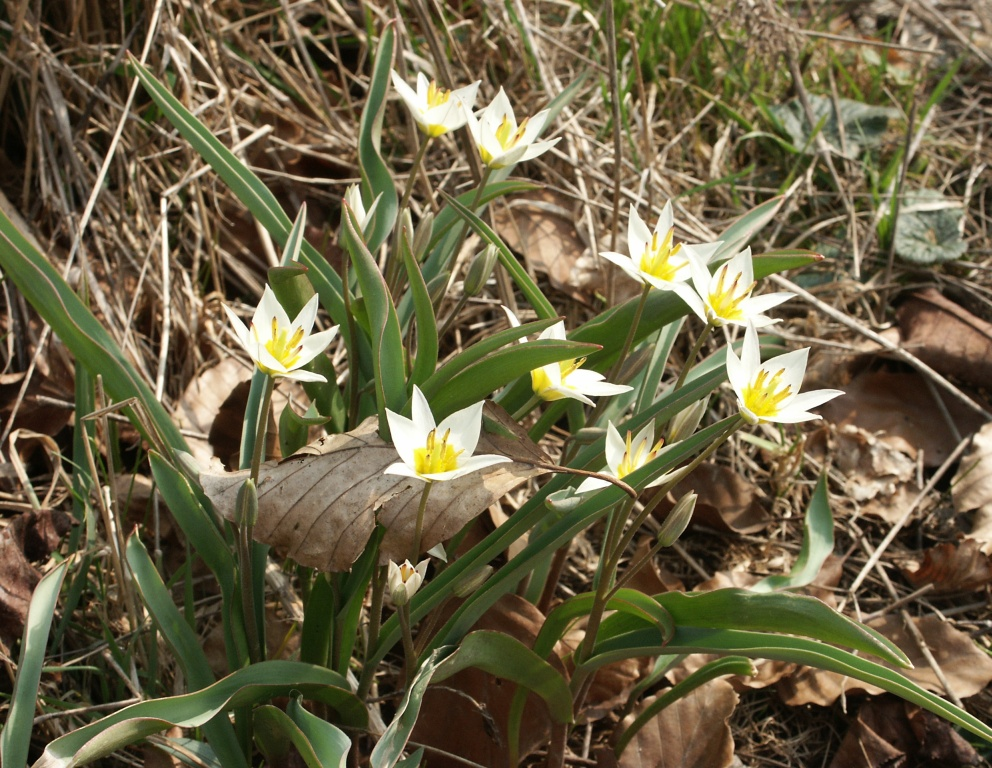

Conservation status
- Least Concern (IUCN 3.1)

Scientific classification
- Kingdom: Plantae
- Clade: Tracheophytes
- Clade: Angiosperms
- Clade: Monocots
- Order: Liliales
- Family: Liliaceae
- Subfamily: Lilioideae
- Tribe: Lilieae
- Genus: Tulipa
- Subgenus: Tulipa subg. Eriostemones
- Species: T. turkestanica

Binomial name
- Tulipa turkestanica (Regel) Regel

Synonyms
- Tulipa sylvestris var. turkestanica Regel

= Tulipa turkestanica =

Turkestan tulip

Species of flowering plant

Tulipa turkestanica, the Turkestan tulip, is a species of tulip native to Central Asia (Kazakhstan, Kyrgyzstan, Tajikistan, Turkmenistan, Uzbekistan and possibly Xinjiang). It was first described by Eduard August von Regel in 1873 as a variety of T. sylvestris, then elevated to full species status two years later.

== Description ==
Tulipa turkestanica is a herbaceous, bulbous perennial growing 10 cm to 15 cm tall, with 2–4 thin glaucous leaves up to 15 cm long on each stem. The margins and tips have a pinkish colour. The leathery bulb is bright reddish-brown and has a hairy tunic. Each plant produces between one and twelve star-shaped flowers, grouped in a raceme. The flowers are ivory white to pinkish red, with a yellow to orange basal blotch, which extends to about a third of the flower. The backs of the outer tepals are greyish red with a whitish fringe and much wider than the inner tepals, which have a thin, green line on the middle of their outside. The filaments are orange, and the anthers are dark violet or yellow with a violet tip, which distinguishes it from T. biflora that has very similar flowers but yellow anthers. It is also slightly smaller and flowers slightly earlier. The flowers only open in direct sunlight. The smell is often described as unpleasant. In the wild, it flowers between March and May, depending on the altitude.

== Distribution ==
The Turkestan tulip is found in the Pamir Alai and Tien Shan; Kazakhstan, Kyrgyzstan, Uzbekistan, Turkestan, Iran and Dzungaria in Northwest China. It grows on stony slopes, river margins and rocky ledges between 1800 and 2500 m asl.

== Cultivation and uses ==
Tulipa turkestanica is an ornamental plant often grown in rock gardens. It needs full sun. In England, it flowers in the middle of March. As other tulips of the Eriostemenes group, Tulipa turkestanica cannot be crossed with garden tulips.

Tulipa turkestanica has received the Royal Horticultural Society's Award of Garden Merit.

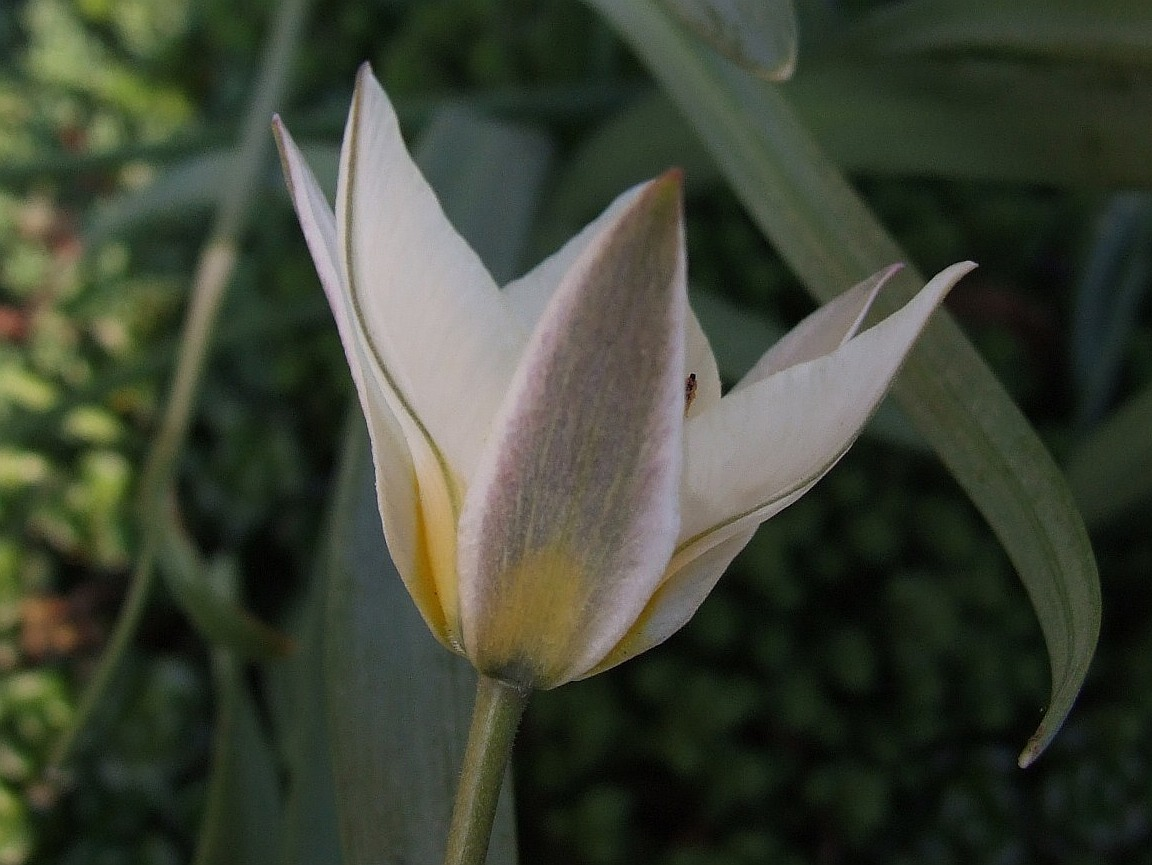

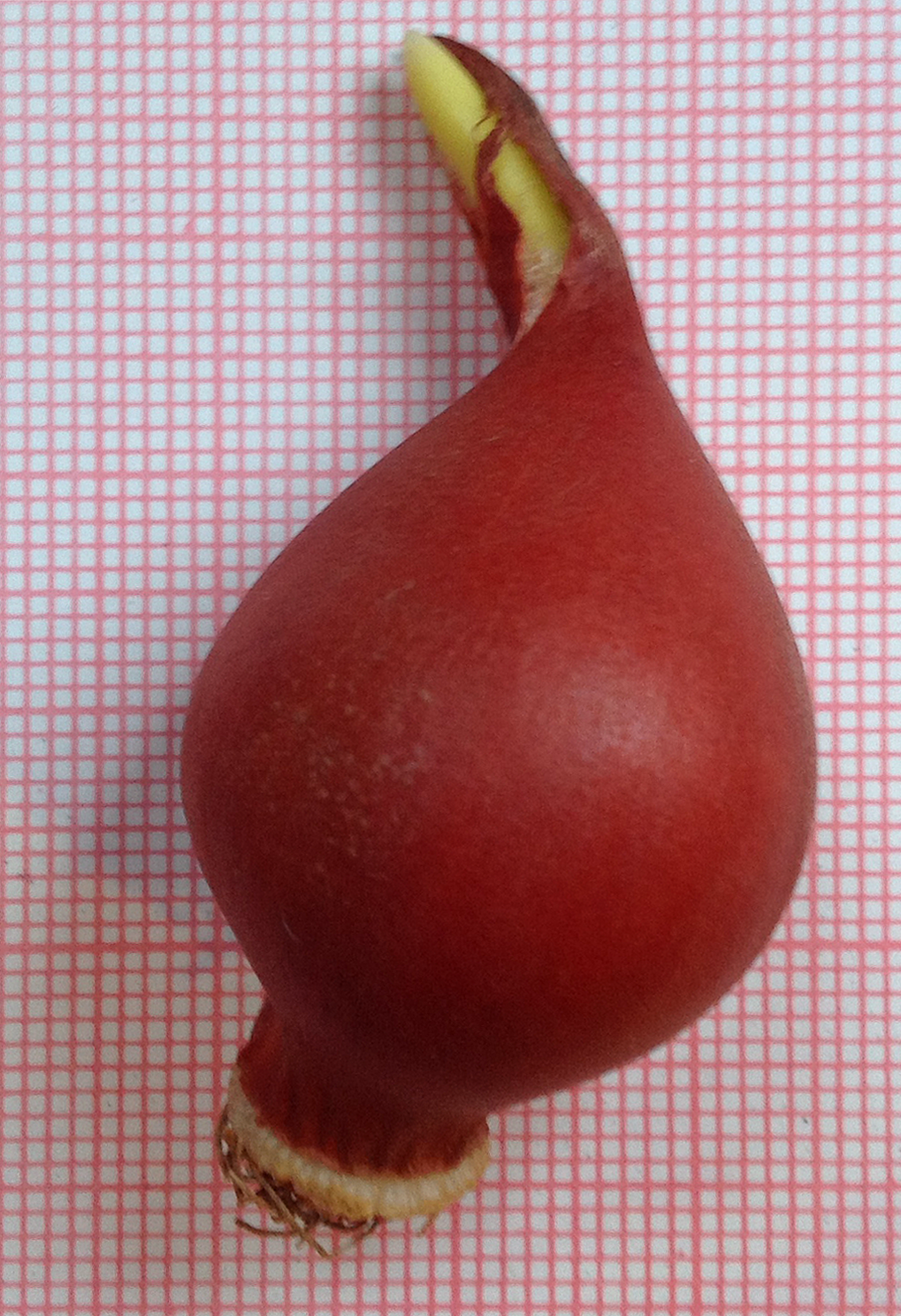
Bulb
