= Reykjavík Botanic Garden =

Botanical garden in Reykjavík

Coordinates: 64°8′27″N 21°52′10″W

Grasagarður Reykjavíkur
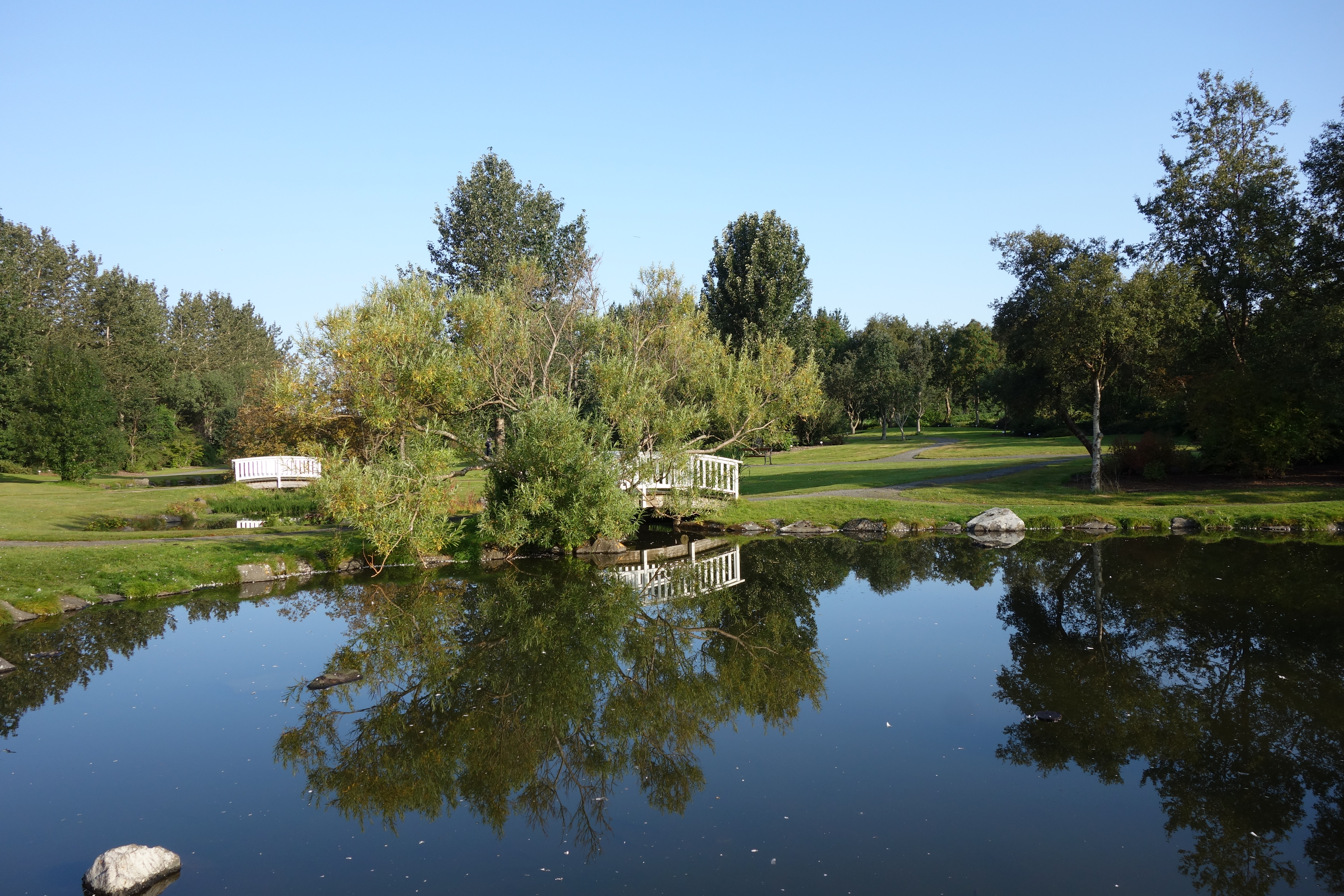
- The pond at the park
- Interactive map of Grasagarður Reykjavíkur
- Type: Botanical garden
- Location: Reykjavík, Iceland
- Area: 8.5 ha (21 acres)
- Created: 1961
- Operator: Municipality
- Website: Official website

Reykjavík Botanic Garden (Latin: Hortus Botanicus Reykjavikensis, Icelandic: Grasagarður Reykjavíkur [ˈkraːsaˌkarðʏr ˈreiːcaˌviːkʏr̥]) is a botanical garden located in the district of Laugardalur in Reykjavík that was established on August 18, 1961, on the 175th anniversary of the city.

The garden currently conserves more than 5,000 plant species in eight plant collections and offers prosperous birdlife, particularly grey geese. One of the many purposes of the institution is education, with guided tours being provided to the public and school groups annually visiting the park. It is a member of the Botanic Gardens Conservation International organization with the code REYK.

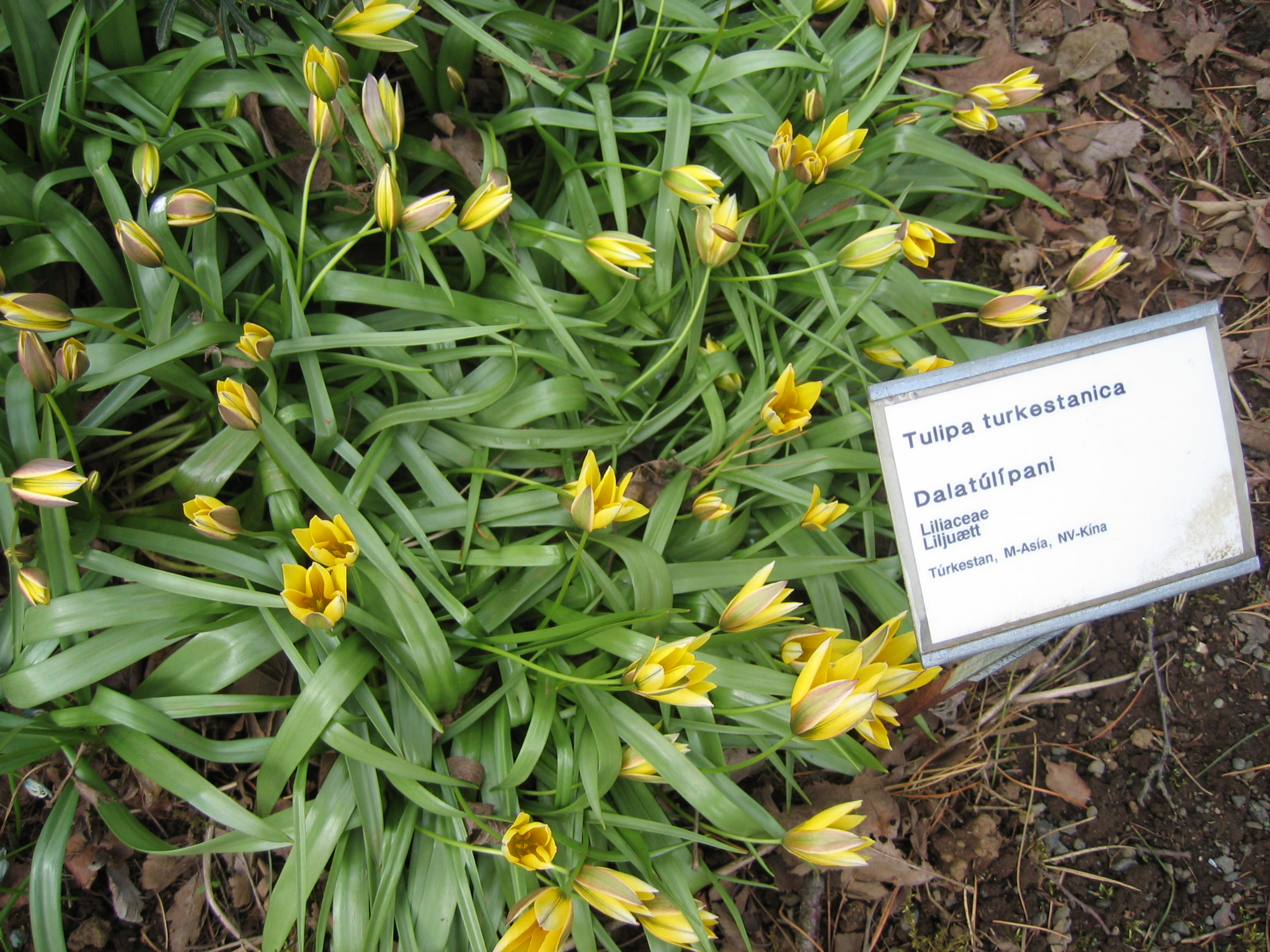
Tulipa turkestanica, labeled with both the scientific name and the Icelandic name
