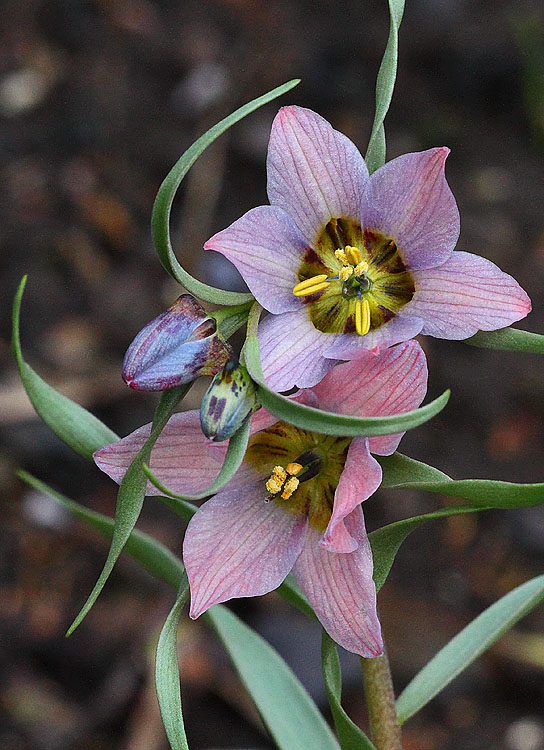

Scientific classification
- Kingdom: Plantae
- Clade: Tracheophytes
- Clade: Angiosperms
- Clade: Monocots
- Order: Liliales
- Family: Liliaceae
- Subfamily: Lilioideae
- Tribe: Lilieae
- Genus: Fritillaria
- Species: F. gibbosa

Binomial name
- Fritillaria gibbosa Boiss.

Synonyms
- Synonymy: Fritillaria garelinii f. gibbosa (Boiss.) Bornm.; Fritillaria karelinii f. gibbosa (Boiss.) Bornm.; Rhinopetalum gibbosum (Boiss.) Losinsk. & Vved.; Fritillaria pterocarpa Stocks; Rhinopetalum triste Eversm. ex Ledeb.; Rhinopetalum boissieri Klatt

= Fritillaria gibbosa =

Species of plant in the lily family

Fritillaria gibbosa is a species of herbaceous perennial plant in the lily family Liliaceae. It is native to Afghanistan, Iran, Pakistan, Turkmenistan, and Transcaucasia.

Fritillaria gibbosa is up to 30 cm (12 in) tall. The flowers are rotate (wide open and nearly flat) rather than bell-shaped as in most of the species in the genus, and pink with darker spots.
