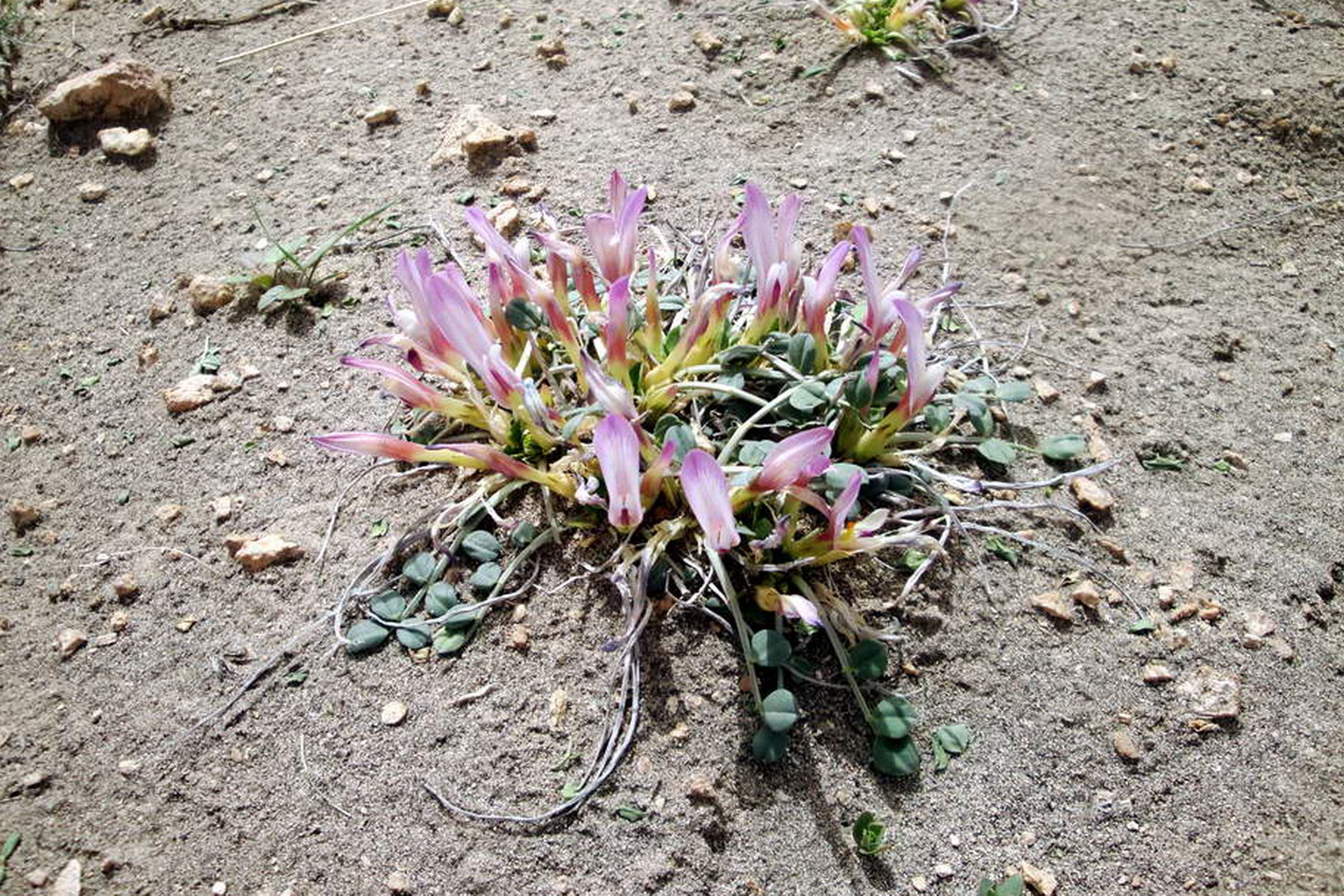

Scientific classification
- Kingdom: Plantae
- Clade: Tracheophytes
- Clade: Angiosperms
- Clade: Eudicots
- Clade: Rosids
- Order: Fabales
- Family: Fabaceae
- Subfamily: Faboideae
- Genus: Astragalus
- Species: A. paradoxus

Binomial name
- Astragalus paradoxus Bunge

= Astragalus paradoxus =

Species of legume

Astragalus paradoxus is a species of milkvetch in the family Fabaceae.Endangered species with fragmented area of distribution.

Perennial, almost glabrous plant. Stems very abbreviated, subterranean, densely covered with fibrose remains of petioles of the dead leaves. Leaves 4–20 cm long; leaflets 5–6–paired. Peduncles very short, 2–3–flowered. Corolla whitetinged with lilac; carina darker. Flag 20–55 mm long; carina and alas coalescent with androphore up to ½ of length. Legumes ovoid–globular.

Grows in lower mountain belt, at the altitudes of 800–1000 meters above sea level, in sandy places, in the desert and semi–desert. Flowering from April to May, fruiting from May to June.

One of the populations is situated in the area "Sands of Goravan" reservation included into "Khosrov Forest" State Reserve. Necessary: monitoring of the population state.
