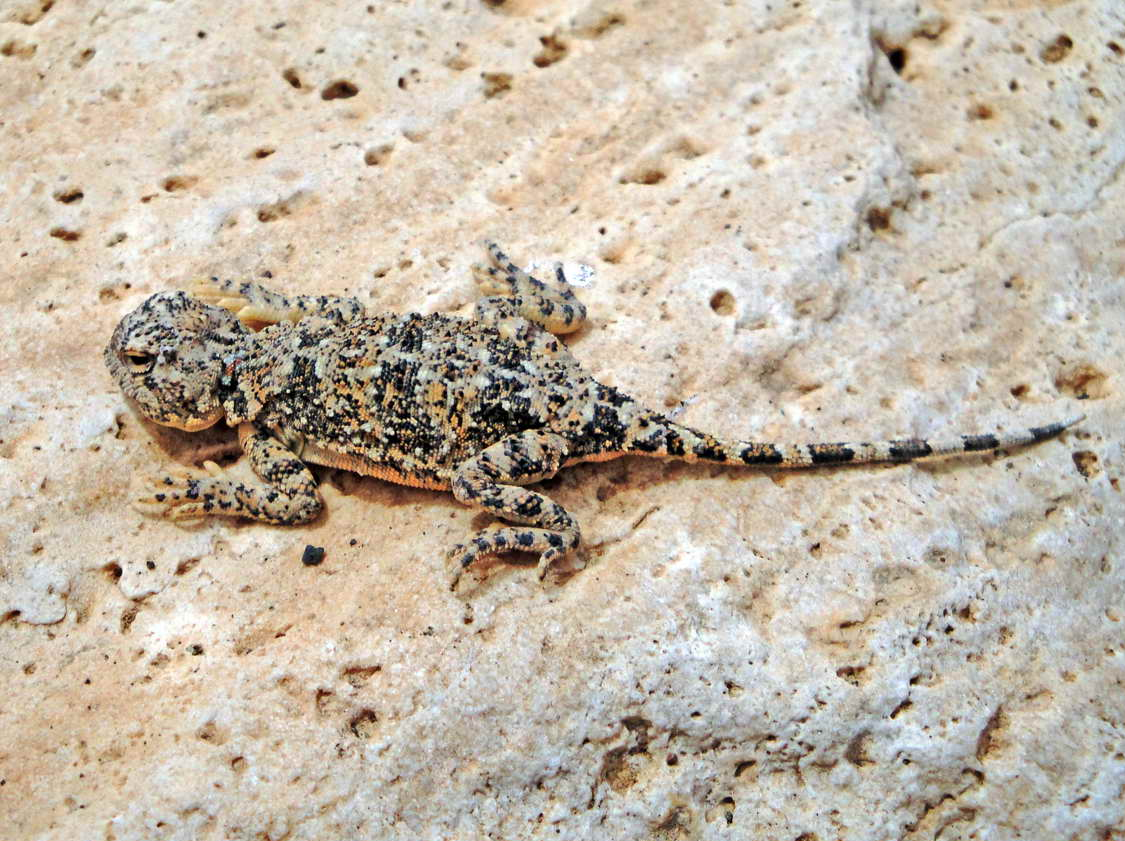

Conservation status
- Critically Endangered (IUCN 3.1)

Scientific classification
- Kingdom: Animalia
- Phylum: Chordata
- Class: Reptilia
- Order: Squamata
- Suborder: Iguania
- Family: Agamidae
- Genus: Phrynocephalus
- Species: P. horvathi

Binomial name
- Phrynocephalus horvathi (Méhely, 1894)

Synonyms
- P. helioscopus subspecies horvathi Méhely, 1894; P. persicus subspecies horvathi Méhely, 1894

= Phrynocephalus horvathi =

Species of lizard

Phrynocephalus horvathi is a small diurnal desert lizard in the family Agamidae. It is endemic to the valley of the Aras River and considered Critically Endangered.

== Taxonomy ==
The phylogeny within the genus Phrynocephalus is not well understood and has been the subject of recent revisions. Following Melnikov et al. (2008), the IUCN considers P. horvathi and P. persicus different species rather than subspecies of P. persicus (for details see Phrynocephalus persicus). This usage has been followed here, contrary to the Reptile Database.

== Description ==
The neotype, an adult male, measures 48 mm (1.9 in) in snout–vent length, and has a 60 mm (2.4 in) tail. The body is slender and depressed; also the head is depressed. There is a crest, consisting of a row of nine thornlike scales, along the middle line of neck.

== Distribution and habitat ==
P. horvathi occurs in several isolated populations the valley of the Aras River in Armenia, Azerbaijan, and Turkey, at elevations of up to 500 m. Like P. persicus, this species prefers vegetation patches on loose sandy soils in semi-deserts, but can also be found on traditional arable land.

== Conservation ==
The species is categorized as "critically endangered" due to its fragmented range, small populations and some 80 percent of its habitat having been lost over the past three generations (12 years) to the spread of agriculture and urbanization. A total population estimate of less than 2,000 individuals was made in 2008. P. horvathi is present in at least one official conservation area.
