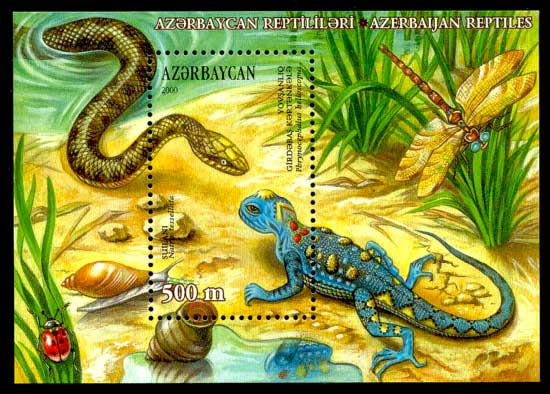

Conservation status
- Vulnerable (IUCN 3.1)

Scientific classification
- Kingdom: Animalia
- Phylum: Chordata
- Class: Reptilia
- Order: Squamata
- Suborder: Iguania
- Family: Agamidae
- Genus: Phrynocephalus
- Species: P. persicus

Binomial name
- Phrynocephalus persicus De Filippi (1863)

Synonyms
- P. helioscopus subspecies persicus Méhely (1894)

= Phrynocephalus persicus =

Species of lizard

Phrynocephalus persicus, commonly known as the Persian toad-headed agama, is a small diurnal desert lizard of the family Agamidae. It is the westernmost representative of the Central Asian genus of toad-headed agamas Phrynocephalus and is only known from deserts and semideserts of Iran and possibly Azerbaijan.

== Taxonomy ==
Phylogeny within the genus Phrynocephalus is not well understood yet. There is a lack of data and controversy between opinions regarding both phylogenetic relationships and species vs. subspecies status of the different forms Phrynocephalus helioscopus and Phrynocephalus persicus, also called the "helioscopus-persicus complex".

There is an ongoing scientific debate about the phylogeny and the taxonomic format of Phrynocephalus persicus. Recent studies suggest existence of at least two distinct subspecies: the Persian toad-headed agama (Phrynocephalus persicus persicus De Filippi, 1863) from northern and central Iran, and Horvath's toad-headed agama (Phrynocephalus persicus horvathi Mehely, 1894) from Armenia, Azerbaijan, NW Iran and NE Turkey. The IUCN considers P. persicus and P. horvathi as two distinct species, and classifies the Phrynocephalus persicus as Vulnerable, while Phrynocephalus horvathi is Critically Endangered. This usage has been followed here.

=== Proposed subspecies ===
- P. persicus persicus Solovyova et al. (2011)
- P. persicus horvathi Solovyova et al. (2011)
- P. helioscopus horvathi Méhely (1894)
- P. helioscopus var. horvathi Méhely (1894)
- P. horvathi Rostombekov (1938)

== Description ==
The snout-vent length of the body and weight ranges between 2.3 cm and 0.4 g in newborns and 7 cm and 7.8 g in adults. There is a sexual dimorphism in morphology (size, color) and behavior. Females are slightly larger than males. P. persicus appears to have a shorter tail compared to P. horvathi.

Like its relatives, the species does not have visible ear-drums. Head and body are wide and covered with small scales. There is no large shield on the head as in Lacertidae lizards. Coloration is cryptic and usually corresponds to the color of the surrounding substrate, which makes the lizard almost invisible. Scales of different size, shape and color associated to create a mosaic pattern, which serves as camouflage allowing the lizard to blend in with a sandy substrate. Accumulations of conical scales create more or less symmetrically distributed dark spots of the color pattern. The dorsal pattern consists of transverse series of dark dots which form pronounced dark areas on the shoulders and the lumbar region of the body. The center of the back may carry 1–3 latitudinally spread groups of dark spots, or may be free of any pattern. There are usually 2–3 prolonged red surrounded by blue areas on the neck. Color of these areas serves as a "pregnancy indicator". In gravid females red coloration turns bluish-grey and areas become blue. Belly is white with bright orange wash in the rare (abdominal) part. Tail usually carries latitudinally striped pattern form dark and white segments. Ventral surface of the tail in lizards from Armenia is dark grey in males and yellowish in females.

== Distribution and habitat ==
The species occurs in fragmented populations in the northwestern and western parts of the Central Plateau in Iran. Reports from Azerbaijan have not been confirmed in the past 50 years. The species inhabits semi-desert on plateaus at an elevation of up to 1,150m.

== Ecology ==
The life span of P. persicus is 2.5–3 years. Juveniles become adults at an age of less than one year. The species feeds on a variety of arthropods including ants, small spiders, beetles and orthopterans and even venomous arthropods such as spiders, bees and wasps.

P. persicus is oviparous, i.e. a female lays eggs to reproduce. Females may make 1–3 clutches of 2–4 small eggs, depending on the duration of the warm season, which, in its turn, heavily depends on elevation of the local terrain. The female lays the eggs into a narrow around 30 cm deep burrow she has dug into the sand. During the period of gravidity, females demonstrate a specifically aggressive behavior towards conspecifics and other invaders as well. This behavior includes walking on extended rear limbs with an inflated abdomen, collateral rotations of the curved end of the tail, tail-markings on the sand, and open mouth attacks.

== Conservation ==
The species is fairly common in suitable habitat but patchily distributed. It is currently classified as Vulnerable by the IUCN. Its geographic range does overlap with areas of intense land use, making large scale habitat loss a major threat. Overgrazing, uncontrolled collection, road mortality as well as predation by larger animals have been documented. Habitats of the lizard are preserved as small islets of semi-desert surrounded by agrarian lands. Despite positive experience in captive breeding of P. horvathi, no stable captive colonies exist.
