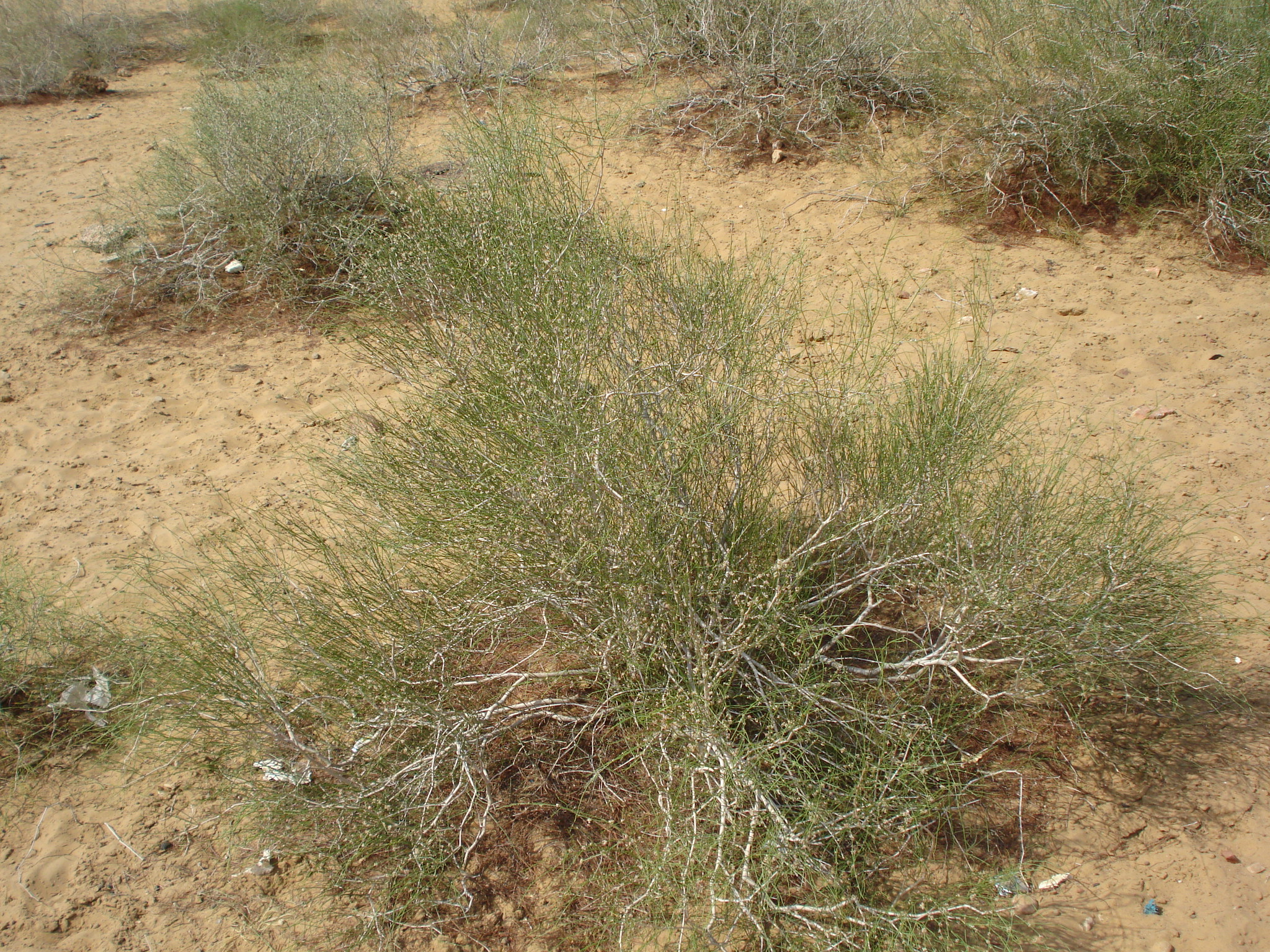

Scientific classification
- Kingdom: Plantae
- Clade: Tracheophytes
- Clade: Angiosperms
- Clade: Eudicots
- Order: Caryophyllales
- Family: Polygonaceae
- Genus: Calligonum
- Species: C. polygonoides

Binomial name
- Calligonum polygonoides L.

= Calligonum polygonoides =

Species of plant

Calligonum polygonoides, locally known as phog (Rajasthani: फोग), is a small shrub found in Thar Desert areas, usually 4 feet to 6 feet high but occasionally may reach even 10 feet in height with a girth of 1 to 2 ft. This plant is referred to as orta in old Arabic poetry. It commonly grows on dry sandy soils and on sand dunes. It is very hardy and being capable of growing under adverse conditions of soil and moisture. It is frost hardy. It produces root suckers and is easily propagated by cutting and layering.

== Uses ==
Its charcoal is used to melt iron. Its flowers, known as phogalo in Rajasthani, are used to prepare raita.

The plant is fed to cattle. It is an important part of the habitat for semi-desert wildlife.
