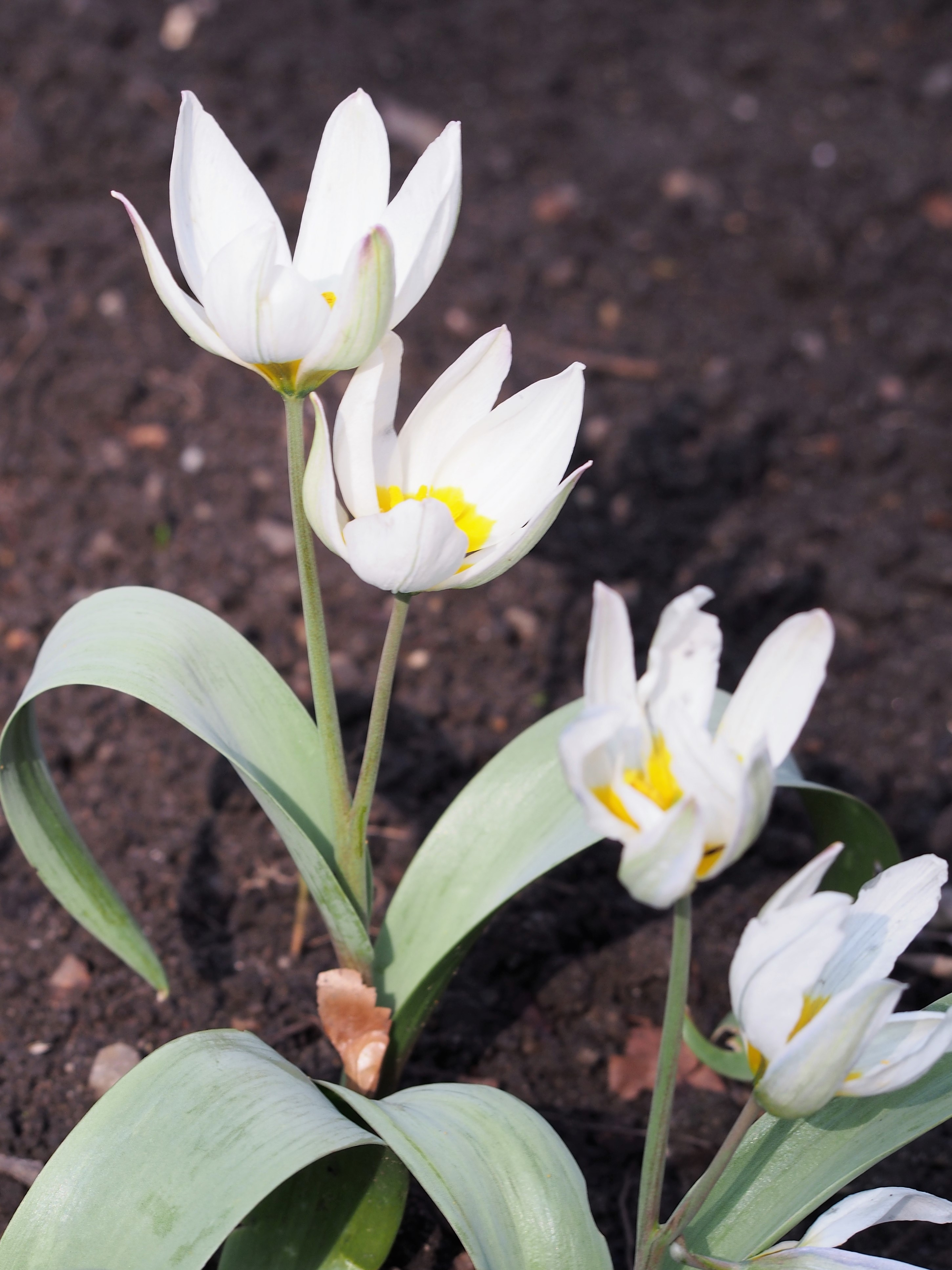

Scientific classification
- Kingdom: Plantae
- Clade: Embryophytes
- Clade: Tracheophytes
- Clade: Spermatophytes
- Clade: Angiosperms
- Clade: Monocots
- Order: Liliales
- Family: Liliaceae
- Subfamily: Lilioideae
- Tribe: Lilieae
- Genus: Tulipa
- Species: T. biflora

Binomial name
- Tulipa biflora Pall.

Synonyms
- List: Liriopogon biflorum (Pall.) Raf.; Orithyia biflora (Pall.) Kunth; Podonix albiflora Raf.; Tulipa androssowii Litv.; Tulipa binutans Vved.; Tulipa bucharica Merckl. ex Boiss.; Tulipa buhseana Boiss.; Tulipa crispatula Boiss. & Buhse; Tulipa halophila Bornm. & Gauba; Tulipa koktebelica Junge; Tulipa polychroma Stapf; Tulipa prolongata Vved.; Tulipa sogdiana Bunge; Tulipa turcomanica B.Fedtsch.

= Tulipa biflora =

Species of flowering plant

Tulipa biflora, the two-flowered tulip, is a species of tulip, native to the former Yugoslavia, Crimea, Anatolia, the Caucasus, southern Russia, Egypt, the Middle East, Central Asia, Iran, Pakistan, Afghanistan and Xinjiang in China. It has many synonyms, including Tulipa polychroma.

It can be found on screes, rocky slopes, grassy slopes and deserts. It can be found in the salt deserts in the basin of the Wolga and it can often found with the small yellow tulip, Tulipa sylvestris.

Cultivated, it has two, occasionally one or three, flowers borne on a single stalk. It has stems that can grow up to 10 cm (3.9 in) tall, with 2 (or sometimes more) grey-green leaves. They are lanceolate (lance-like in shape). It blooms between late winter to spring, and the flowers are 2–3.5 cm (0.8–1.4 in) long. They are white with a yellow centre, the tepal (smaller petal) have greenish-grey backs. The flowers are fragrant.

Most parts of plant are poisonous if they are ingested.

== Taxonomy ==
It was found in the Caucasus, and then published by Peter Simon Pallas in 'Reise durch Verschiedene Provinzen des Russischen Reichs.' (Reise Russ. Reich. printed in St. Petersburg), Vol.3 on page 727 in 1776.

== Other Sources ==
- Aldén, B., S. Ryman, & M. Hjertson. 2012. Svensk Kulturväxtdatabas, SKUD (Swedish Cultivated and Utility Plants Database; online resource) URL: www.skud.info
- Davis, P. H., ed. 1965-1988. Flora of Turkey and the east Aegean islands.
- Komarov, V. L. et al., eds. 1934-1964. Flora SSSR.
- Raamsdonk, L. W. D. van & T. de Vries. 1992. Biosystematic studies in Tulipa sect. Eriostemones (Liliaceae). Pl. Syst. Evol. 179:37. Note: mentions
- Rechinger, K. H., ed. 1963-. Flora iranica.
- Skvortsov, A. K., ed. 2006. Flora of the Lower Volga region 1:366.
- Tutin, T. G. et al., eds. 1964-1980. Flora europaea.
- Walters, S. M. et al., eds. 1986-2000. European garden flora.
