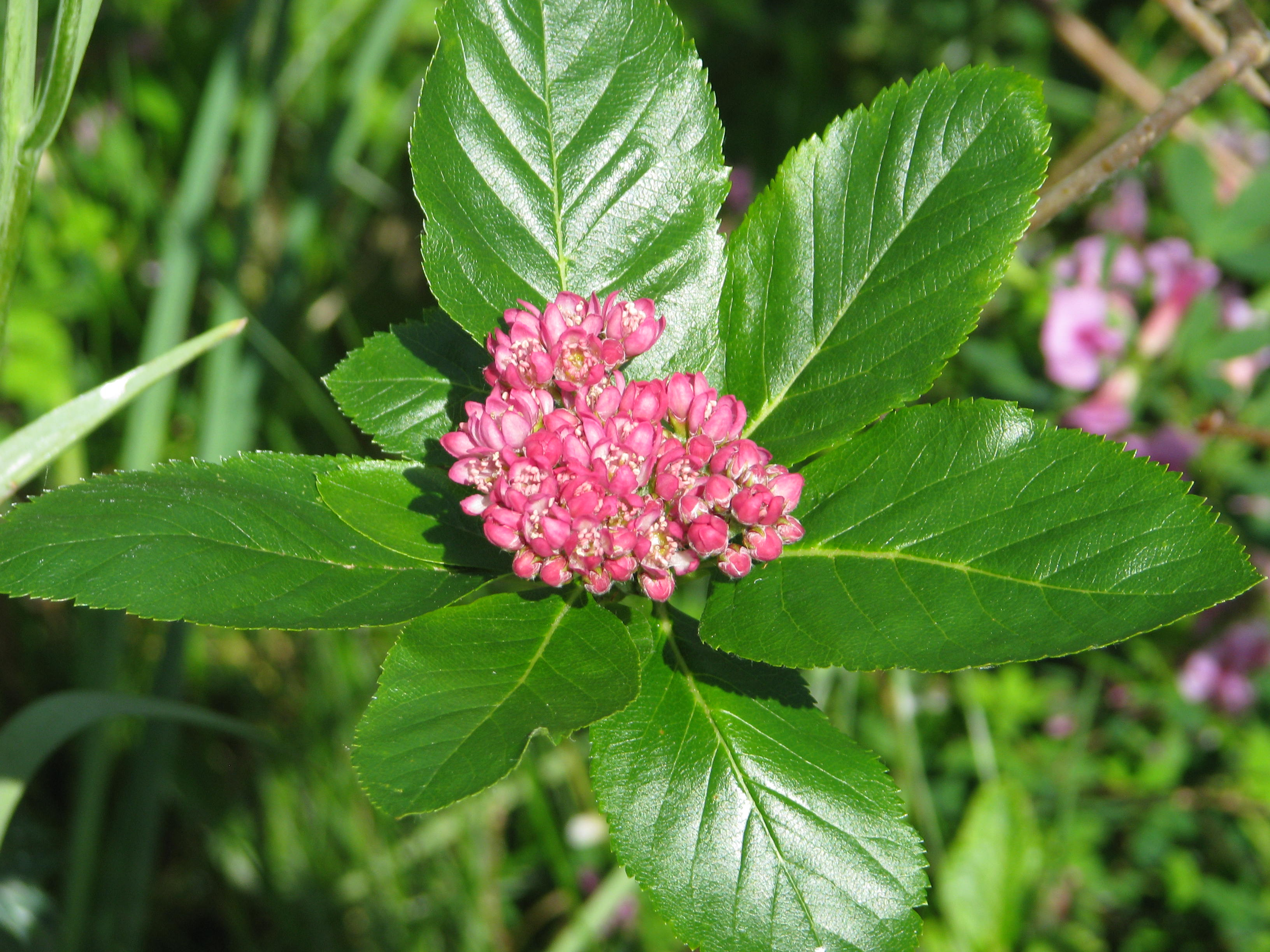

Conservation status
- Least Concern (IUCN 3.1)

Scientific classification
- Kingdom: Plantae
- Clade: Tracheophytes
- Clade: Angiosperms
- Clade: Eudicots
- Clade: Rosids
- Order: Rosales
- Family: Rosaceae
- Genus: Aria
- Species: A. chamaemespilus

Binomial name
- Aria chamaemespilus (L.) Host

Synonyms
- List (Species): Aria chamaemespilus (L.) Host; Aria chamaemespilus var. bicolor Lavallée; Aria crantzii Beck; Aronia ariachamaemespilus Rchb.; Aronia chamaemespilus (L.) Pers.; Azarolus alpina (Mill.) Borkh.; Azarolus chamaemespilus (L.) Borkh.; Chamaemespilus alpina (Mill.) K.R.Robertson & J.B.Phipps; Chamaemespilus humilis M.Roem.; Crataegus alpina Mill.; Crataegus chamaemespilus (L.) Jacq.; Crataegus chamaemespilus discolor Ser.; Crataegus humilis Lam.; Crataegus sorbifolia Desf.; Hahnia chamaemespilus (L.) Medik.; Lazarolus chamaemespilus (L.) Borkh.; Mespilus chamaemespilus L.; Prunus chamaemespilus (L.) Sm.; Pyrenia chamaemespylus (L.) Clairv.; Pyrus alpina (Mill.) Du Roi; Pyrus chamaemespilus (L.) Ehrh.; Pyrus chamaemespilus subvar. crantzii (Beck) Asch. & Graebn.; Pyrus chamaemespilus var. discolor (Hegetschw.) Asch. & Graebn.; Pyrus chamaemespilus var. glabra (Neilr.) Asch. & Graebn.; Pyrus chamaemespilus proles typica Asch. & Graebn.; Pyrus fruticosa (Crantz) M.F.Fay & Christenh.; Sorbus carpatica Andrz.; Sorbus cerasoides Gand.; Sorbus chamaemespilus (L.) Crantz; Sorbus chamaemespilus var. angustifolia A.Kern. ex Murr; Sorbus chamaemespilus f. angustifolia Wilczek & Braun-Blanq.; Sorbus chamaemespilus subsp. calvescens Domin; Sorbus chamaemespilus var. discolor Neilr.; Sorbus chamaemespilus var. discolor Hegetschw.; Sorbus chamaemespilus f. discolor (Hegetschw.) Düll; Sorbus chamaemespilus var. glabra Neilr.; Sorbus chamaemespilus f. grosseserrata Düll; Sorbus chamaemespilus var. lanuginosa Neilr.; Sorbus chamaemespilus minus Simonk.; Sorbus chamaemespilus var. ovalifolia Rouy & E.G.Camus; Sorbus chamaemespilus var. tomentosa Reut.; Sorbus chamaemespilus var. tomentosa Gren.; Sorbus chamaemespilus var. typica (Asch. & Graebn.) Buia; Sorbus crantzii (Beck) Hayek; Sorbus dentosa Gand.; Sorbus fruticosa Crantz; Sorbus pilosula Gand.; Sorbus purpurea Dulac

= Aria chamaemespilus =

Species of flowering plant in the rose family

Aria chamaemespilus is a species of flowering plant in the family Rosaceae, commonly known as false medlar or dwarf whitebeam. It is native to the mountains of central and southern Europe, from the Pyrenees east through the Alps to the Carpathians and the Balkans, growing at altitudes of up to 2500 m.

== Description ==
Aria chamaemespilus is a deciduous shrub growing to 2–3 metres tall. The leaves are spirally arranged, oval-elliptic, 3–7 cm long, with an acute apex and a serrated margin; they are green on both sides, without the white felting found on most whitebeams. The flowers are pink, with five forward-pointing petals 5–7 mm long; they are produced in corymbs 3–4 cm diameter. The fruit is an oval red pome 10–13 mm diameter.

== Taxonomy ==
The species was first described as Mespilus chamaemespilus by Linnaeus in 1753. It was soon transferred to the genus Sorbus, as Sorbus chamaemespilus, by Crantz in 1763; it remained almost universally known by this name until nearly the end of the 20th century or even later, often placed in its own subgenus Sorbus subgenus Chamaemespilus, distinguished from other subgenera of Sorbus by the pink (not white) flowers with forward-pointing petals (not opening flat). With the start of genetic analysis, Sorbus was however found to be polyphyletic in 1991 and split into several genera; Sorbus chamaemespilus was then placed in the monotypic genus Chamaemespilus as Chamaemespilus alpina (since the combination "Chamaemespilus chamaemespilus", being a tautonym, is not admissible in botany). More recently, it has become clear that the simple-leafed species traditionally included in Sorbus form a monophyletic group, and this species could thus be included in an expanded genus Aria. The Plants of the World Online database now accepts this transfer to the name Aria chamaemespilus.

== Gallery ==
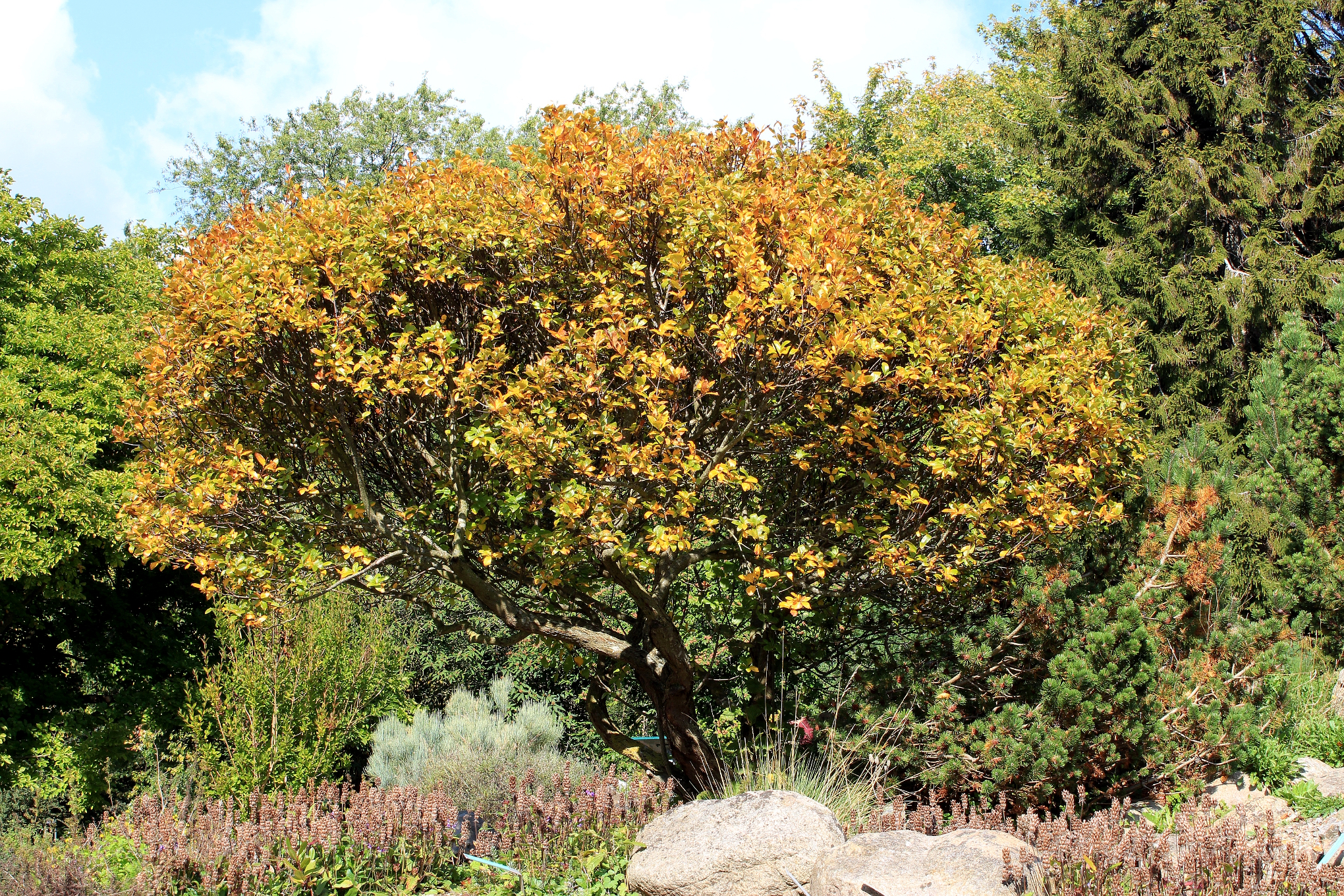
Tree in autumn

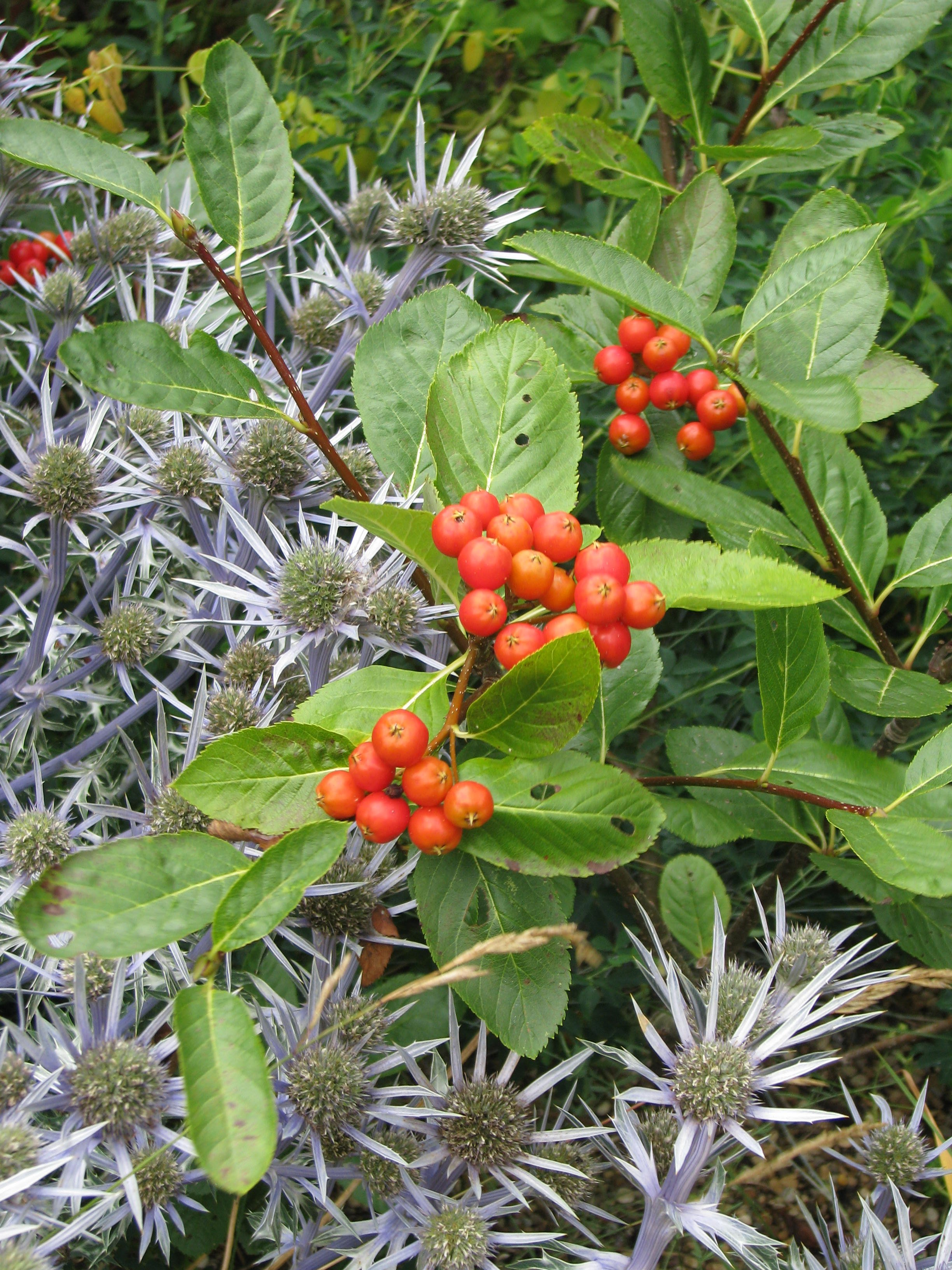
fruit
