= List of Rosaceae of Great Britain and Ireland =

List of the vascular plants of Britain and Ireland #5 — this page's list covers the dicotyledon family Rosaceae.

Status key: * indicates an introduced species and e indicates an extirpated species.

== Rosaceae species ==
English name	Scientific name	Status
False spiraea	Sorbaria sorbifolia	*
Himalayan sorbaria	Sorbaria tomentosa	*
Chinese sorbaria	Sorbaria kirilowii	*
Ninebark	Physocarpus opulifolius	*
Bridewort	Spiraea salicifolia	*
Pale bridewort	Spiraea alba	*
Steeple-bush	Spiraea douglasii	*
Hardhack	Spiraea tomentosa	*
Japanese spiraea	Spiraea japonica	*
Himalayan spiraea	Spiraea canescens	*
Elm-leaved spiraea	Spiraea chamaedryfolia	*
Buck's-beard	Aruncus dioicus	*
Oceanspray	Holodiscus discolor	*
Dropwort	Filipendula vulgaris	
Meadowsweet	Filipendula ulmaria	
Giant meadowsweet	Filipendula kamtschatica	*
Kerria	Kerria japonica	*
Cloudberry	Rubus chamaemorus	
Chinese bramble	Rubus tricolor	*
Stone bramble	Rubus saxatilis	
Arctic bramble	Rubus arcticus	e
Purple-flowered raspberry	Rubus odoratus	*
Thimbleberry	Rubus parviflorus	*
Raspberry	Rubus idaeus	
Japanese wineberry	Rubus phoenicolasius	*
Salmonberry	Rubus spectabilis	*
Loganberry	Rubus loganobaccus	*
White-stemmed bramble	Rubus cockburnianus	*
A bramble	Rubus accrescens	
Allegheny blackberry	Rubus allegheniensis	*
A bramble	Rubus arrheniensis	
A bramble	Rubus bertramii	
A bramble	Rubus briggsianus	
Smooth blackberry	Rubus canadensis	*
A bramble	Rubus daltrii	
A bramble	Rubus divaricatus	
A bramble	Rubus fissus	
A bramble	Rubus glanduliger	
A bramble	Rubus integribasis	
A bramble	Rubus nessensis	
A bramble	Rubus nitidiformis	
A bramble	Rubus nobilissimus	
A bramble	Rubus plicatus	
A bramble	Rubus scissus	
A bramble	Rubus subopacus	
A bramble	Rubus sulcatus	
A bramble	Rubus trelleckensis	
A bramble	Rubus vigorosus	
A bramble	Rubus adspersus	
A bramble	Rubus albionis	
A bramble	Rubus averyanus	
A bramble	Rubus boulayi	
A bramble	Rubus calvatus	
A bramble	Rubus cambrensis	
A bramble	Rubus canterburiensis	
A bramble	Rubus castrensis	
A bramble	Rubus chloophyllus	
A bramble	Rubus chrysoxylon	
A bramble	Rubus confertiflorus	
A bramble	Rubus crespignyanus	
A bramble	Rubus crudelis	
A bramble	Rubus cumbrensis	
A bramble	Rubus dasycoccus	
A bramble	Rubus dobuniensis	
A bramble	Rubus durescens	
A bramble	Rubus ebudensis	
A bramble	Rubus errabundus	
A bramble	Rubus gratus	
A bramble	Rubus hesperius	
A bramble	Rubus imbricatus	
Cutleaf evergreen blackberry	Rubus laciniatus	*
A bramble	Rubus lacustris	
A bramble	Rubus lentiginosus	
A bramble	Rubus leptothyrsos	
A bramble	Rubus leucandriformis	
A bramble	Rubus lindleianus	
A bramble	Rubus ludensis	
Large-leaved bramble	Rubus macrophyllus	
A bramble	Rubus mercicus	
A bramble	Rubus mollissimus	
A bramble	Rubus monensis	
A bramble	Rubus obesifolius	
A bramble	Rubus oxyanchus	
A bramble	Rubus perdigitatus	
A bramble	Rubus platyacanthus	
A bramble	Rubus pliocenicus	
A bramble	Rubus plymensis	
A bramble	Rubus poliodes	
A bramble	Rubus polyoplus	
A bramble	Rubus pullifolius	
A bramble	Rubus purbeckensis	
A bramble	Rubus pyramidalis	
A bramble	Rubus questieri	
A bramble	Rubus riparius	
A bramble	Rubus robiae	
A bramble	Rubus salteri	
A bramble	Rubus sciocharis	
A bramble	Rubus silurum	
A bramble	Rubus silvaticus	
A bramble	Rubus sneydii	
A bramble	Rubus subintegribasis	
A bramble	Rubus varvicensis	
A bramble	Rubus viridescens	
A bramble	Rubus acclivitatum	
A bramble	Rubus altiarcuatus	
A bramble	Rubus amplificatus	
A bramble	Rubus bakerianus	
A bramble	Rubus boudiccae	
A bramble	Rubus cardiophyllus	
A bramble	Rubus carnkiefensis	
A bramble	Rubus cissburiensis	
A bramble	Rubus cordatifolius	
A bramble	Rubus cornubiensis	
A bramble	Rubus curvispinosus	
A bramble	Rubus daveyi	
A bramble	Rubus diversiarmatus	
A bramble	Rubus dumnoniensis	
A bramble	Rubus elegantispinosus	*
A bramble	Rubus furnarius	
A bramble	Rubus herefordensis	
A bramble	Rubus incurvatiformis	
A bramble	Rubus incurvatus	
A bramble	Rubus iricus	
A bramble	Rubus lasiodermis	
A bramble	Rubus lindebergii	
A bramble	Rubus londinensis	
A bramble	Rubus milfordensis	
A bramble	Rubus nemoralis	
A bramble	Rubus pampinosus	
A bramble	Rubus patuliformis	
A bramble	Rubus pervalidus	
A bramble	Rubus pistoris	
A bramble	Rubus polyanthemus	
A bramble	Rubus prolongatus	
A bramble	Rubus ramosus	
A bramble	Rubus rhombifolius	
A bramble	Rubus riddelsdellii	
A bramble	Rubus rubritinctus	
A bramble	Rubus septentrionalis	
A bramble	Rubus stanneus	
A bramble	Rubus subinermoides	
A bramble	Rubus tavensis	
A bramble	Rubus tresidderi	
A bramble	Rubus villicauliformis	
A bramble	Rubus arrhenii	
A bramble	Rubus brevistaminosus	
A bramble	Rubus permundus	
A bramble	Rubus sprengelii	
A bramble	Rubus anglocandicans	
Armenian blackberry	Rubus armeniacus	*
A bramble	Rubus armipotens	
A bramble	Rubus hylophilus	
A bramble	Rubus lamburnensis	
A bramble	Rubus neomalacus	
A bramble	Rubus pydarensis	
A bramble	Rubus rossensis	
Salmonberry	Rubus spectabilis	
Elmleaf blackberry	Rubus ulmifolius	
A bramble	Rubus winteri	
A bramble	Rubus adscitus	
A bramble	Rubus andegavensis	
A bramble	Rubus bartonii	
A bramble	Rubus boraeanus	
A bramble	Rubus conspersus	
A bramble	Rubus cotteswoldensis	
A bramble	Rubus criniger	
A bramble	Rubus euanthinus	
A bramble	Rubus hirsutissimus	
A bramble	Rubus infestisepalus	
A bramble	Rubus lanaticaulis	
A bramble	Rubus lettii	
A bramble	Rubus leucostachys	
A bramble	Rubus longus	
A bramble	Rubus orbus	
A bramble	Rubus ordovicum	
A bramble	Rubus painteri	
A bramble	Rubus surrejanus	
A bramble	Rubus thurstonii	
A bramble	Rubus vestitus	
A bramble	Rubus aquarum	
A bramble	Rubus cinerosiformis	
A bramble	Rubus devoniensis	
A bramble	Rubus egregius	
A bramble	Rubus furvicolor	
A bramble	Rubus fuscicortex	
A bramble	Rubus melanocladus	
A bramble	Rubus mucronatiformis	
A bramble	Rubus mucronatoides	
A bramble	Rubus mucronulatus	
A bramble	Rubus wirralensis	
A bramble	Rubus acutifrons	
A bramble	Rubus aequalidens	
A bramble	Rubus coombensis	
A bramble	Rubus curvidens	
A bramble	Rubus decussatus	
A bramble	Rubus diversus	
A bramble	Rubus erythrops	
A bramble	Rubus fuscoviridis	
A bramble	Rubus gallofuscus	
A bramble	Rubus glareosus	
A bramble	Rubus griffithianus	
A bramble	Rubus hantonensis	
A bramble	Rubus hastiformis	
A bramble	Rubus heterobelus	
A bramble	Rubus laxatifrons	
A bramble	Rubus leightonii	
A bramble	Rubus lintonii	
A bramble	Rubus longifrons	
A bramble	Rubus melanodermis	
A bramble	Rubus micans	
A bramble	Rubus moylei	
A bramble	Rubus newbouldii	
A bramble	Rubus norvicensis	
A bramble	Rubus powellii	
A bramble	Rubus raduloides	
A bramble	Rubus trichodes	
A bramble	Rubus turritus	
A bramble	Rubus ewdgwoodiae	
A bramble	Rubus adamsii	
A bramble	Rubus ahenifolius	
A bramble	Rubus anglofuscus	
A bramble	Rubus anisacanthos	
A bramble	Rubus biloensis	
A bramble	Rubus cinerosus	
A bramble	Rubus dentatifolius	
A bramble	Rubus distractiformis	
A bramble	Rubus drejeri	
A bramble	Rubus dunensis	
A bramble	Rubus effrenatus	
A bramble	Rubus formidabilis	
A bramble	Rubus hartmanii	
A bramble	Rubus hibernicus	
A bramble	Rubus infestus	
A bramble	Rubus leyanus	
A bramble	Rubus metallorum	
A bramble	Rubus morganwgensis	
A bramble	Rubus pascuorum	
A bramble	Rubus adenanthoides	
A bramble	Rubus bloxamianus	
A bramble	Rubus bloxamii	
A bramble	Rubus botryeros	
A bramble	Rubus briggsii	e
A bramble	Rubus cantianus	
A bramble	Rubus cavatifolius	
A bramble	Rubus celticus	
A bramble	Rubus condensatus	
A bramble	Rubus echinatoides	
A bramble	Rubus achinatus	
A bramble	Rubus euryanthemus	
A bramble	Rubus flexuosus	
A bramble	Rubus fuscicaulis	
Upland dewberry	Rubus invisus	
A bramble	Rubus hyposericeus	
A bramble	Rubus informifolius	
A bramble	Rubus insectifolius	
A bramble	Rubus iodnephes	
A bramble	Rubus largificus	
A bramble	Rubus longithyrsiger	
A bramble	Rubus malvernicus	
A bramble	Rubus newbouldianus	
A bramble	Rubus pallidus	
A bramble	Rubus peninsulae	
A bramble	Rubus porphyrocaulis	
A bramble	Rubus putneiensis	
A bramble	Rubus radula	
A bramble	Rubus radulicaulis	
A bramble	Rubus regillus	
A bramble	Rubus rubristylus	
A bramble	Rubus rudis	
A bramble	Rubus rufescens	
A bramble	Rubus sagittarius	
A bramble	Rubus scoticus	
A bramble	Rubus sectiramus	
A bramble	Rubus spadix	
A bramble	Rubus subtercanens	
A bramble	Rubus troiensis	
A bramble	Rubus wolley-dodii	
A bramble	Rubus angusticuspis	
A bramble	Rubus aristisepalus	
A bramble	Rubus atrebatum	
A bramble	Rubus babingtonii	
A bramble	Rubus bercheriensis	
A bramble	Rubus breconensis	
A bramble	Rubus dasyphyllus	
A bramble	Rubus durotrigum	
A bramble	Rubus hylocharis	
A bramble	Rubus iceniensis	
A bramble	Rubus infestior	
A bramble	Rubus marshallii	
A bramble	Rubus merlinii	
A bramble	Rubus asperidens	
A bramble	Rubus murrayi	
A bramble	Rubus naldrettii	
A bramble	Rubus newbridgensis	
A bramble	Rubus pallidisetus	
A bramble	Rubus phaeocarpus	
A bramble	Rubus proiectus	
A bramble	Rubus pseudoplinthostylus	
A bramble	Rubus purchasianus	
A bramble	Rubus rilstonei	
A bramble	Rubus rotundifolius	e
A bramble	Rubus scabripes	
A bramble	Rubus semiglaber	
A bramble	Rubus tamarensis	
A bramble	Rubus tardus	
A bramble	Rubus thyrsigeriformis	
A bramble	Rubus tumulorum	
A bramble	Rubus turneri	e
A bramble	Rubus vigursii	
A bramble	Rubus watsonii	
A bramble	Rubus angloserpens	
A bramble	Rubus hylonomus	
A bramble	Rubus leptadenes	
A bramble	Rubus obscuriflorus	
A bramble	Rubus pedemontanus	
A bramble	Rubus praetextus	
A bramble	Rubus scaber	
A bramble	Rubus adenoleucus	
A bramble	Rubus babingtonianus	
A bramble	Rubus bagnallinaus	
A bramble	Rubus britannicus	
A bramble	Rubus bucknallii	
A bramble	Rubus conjungens	
A bramble	Rubus eboracensis	
A bramble	Rubus halsteadensis	
A bramble	Rubus hebridensis	
A bramble	Rubus intensior	
A bramble	Rubus latifolius	
A bramble	Rubus nemorosus	
A bramble	Rubus pictorum	
A bramble	Rubus pruinosus	
A bramble	Rubus rubriflorus	
A bramble	Rubus tenuiarmatus	
A bramble	Rubus triangularis	
A bramble	Rubus tuberculatus	
A bramble	Rubus warrenii	
Dewberry	Rubus caesius	
Shrubby cinquefoil	Potentilla fruticosa	
Marsh cinquefoil	Potentilla palustris	
Silverweed	Potentilla anserina	
Rock cinquefoil	Potentilla rupestris	
Hoary cinquefoil	Potentilla argentea	
Grey cinquefoil	Potentilla inclinata	*
Sulphur cinquefoil	Potentilla recta	*
Russian cinquefoil	Potentilla intermedia	*
Ternate-leaved cinquefoil	Potentilla norvegica	*
Brook cinquefoil	Potentilla rivalis	*
Alpine cinquefoil	Potentilla crantzii	
Spring cinquefoil	Potentilla neumanniana	
Tormentil	Potentilla erecta	
Trailing tormentil	Potentilla anglica	
Creeping cinquefoil	Potentilla reptans	
Barren strawberry	Potentilla sterilis	
Sibbaldia	Sibbaldia procumbens	
Wild strawberry	Fragaria vesca	
Hautbois strawberry	Fragaria moschata	*
Garden strawberry	Fragaria ananassa	*
Yellow-flowered strawberry	Duchesnea indica	*
Water avens	Geum rivale	
Wood avens	Geum urbanum	
Large-leaved avens	Geum macrophyllum	*
Mountain avens	Dryas octopetala	
Agrimony	Agrimonia eupatoria	
Fragrant agrimony	Agrimonia procera	
Bastard agrimony	Aremonia agrimonoides	*
Great burnet	Sanguisorba officinalis	
White burnet	Sanguisorba canadensis	*
Salad burnet	Sanguisorba minor	
Pirri-pirri-bur	Acaena novae-zelandiae	*
Bronze pirri-pirri-bur	Acaena anserinifolia	*
Two-spined acaena	Acaena ovalifolia	*
Spineless acaena	Acaena inermis	*
Alpine lady's-mantle	Alchemilla alpina	
Silver lady's-mantle	Alchemilla conjuncta	*
A lady's-mantle	Alchemilla glaucescens	
A lady's-mantle	Alchemilla monticola	
A lady's-mantle	Alchemilla tytthantha	*
A lady's-mantle	Alchemilla subcrenata	
A lady's-mantle	Alchemilla acutiloba	
A lady's-mantle	Alchemilla micans	
A lady's-mantle	Alchemilla xanthochlora	
A lady's-mantle	Alchemilla filicaulis	
A lady's-mantle	Alchemilla minima	
A lady's-mantle	Alchemilla glomerulans	
A lady's-mantle	Alchemilla wichurae	
A lady's-mantle	Alchemilla glabra	
A lady's-mantle	Alchemilla mollis	*
Parsley-piert	Aphanes arvensis	
Slender parsley-piert	Aphanes australis	
Many-flowered rose	Rosa multiflora	*
Prairie rose	Rosa setigera	*
Memorial rose	Rosa luciae	*
Field-rose	Rosa arvensis	
Burnet rose	Rosa pimpinellifolia	
Japanese rose	Rosa rugosa	*
Dutch rose	Rosa 'Hollandica'	*
Red-leaved rose	Rosa ferruginea	*
Virginian rose	Rosa virginiana	*
Red rose	Rosa gallica	*
Short-styled field-rose	Rosa stylosa	
Dog-rose	Rosa canina	
Hairy dog-rose	Rosa caesia	
Round-leaved dog-rose	Rosa obtusifolia	
Harsh downy-rose	Rosa tomentosa	
Sherard's downy-rose	Rosa sherardii	
Soft downy-rose	Rosa mollis	
Sweet-briar	Rosa rubiginosa	
Small-flowered sweet-briar	Rosa micrantha	
Small-leaved sweet-briar	Rosa agrestis	
Peach	Prunus persica	*
Almond	Prunus dulcis	*
Cherry plum	Prunus cerasifera	*
Blackthorn	Prunus spinosa	
Wild plum	Prunus domestica	*
Wild cherry	Prunus avium	
Dwarf cherry	Prunus cerasus	*
St Lucie cherry	Prunus mahaleb	*
Pin cherry	Prunus pensylvanica	*
Fuji cherry	Prunus incisa	*
Bird cherry	Prunus padus	
Rum cherry	Prunus serotina	*
Portugal laurel	Prunus lusitanica	*
Cherry laurel	Prunus laurocerasus	*
Osoberry	Oemleria cerasiformis	*
Quince	Cydonia oblonga	*
Chinese quince	Chaenomeles speciosa	*
Plymouth pear	Pyrus cordata	
Wild pear	Pyrus pyraster	*
Pear	Pyrus communis	*
Crab apple	Malus sylvestris	
Apple	Malus domestica	*
Service tree	Cormus domestica (previously Sorbus domestica)	
Rowan	Sorbus aucuparia	
Arran service tree	Hedlundia pseudofennica (previously Sorbus pseudofennica)	
Finnish whitebeam	Hedlundia hybrida (previously Sorbus hybrida)	*
Arran whitebeam	Hedlundia arranensis (previously Sorbus arranensis)	
Ley's whitebeam	Hedlundia leyana (previously Sorbus leyana)	
Lesser whitebeam	Hedlundia minima (previously Sorbus minima)	
Swedish whitebeam	Scandosorbus intermedia (previously Sorbus intermedia)	*
English whitebeam	Hedlundia anglica (previously Sorbus anglica)	
Scannell's whitebeam	Hedlundia scannelliana (previously Sorbus scannelliana)	
bastard service tree	Hedlundia thuringiaca (previously Sorbus thuringiaca)	
Whitebeam	Aria edulis (previously Sorbus aria)	
Thin-leaved whitebeam	Aria leptophylla (previously Sorbus leptophylla)	
Willmott's whitebeam	Aria wilmottiana (previously Sorbus wilmottiana)	
Round-leaved whitebeam	Aria eminens (previously Sorbus eminens)	
Irish whitebeam	Aria hibernica (previously Sorbus hibernica)	
A common whitebeam	Aria porrigentiformis (previously Sorbus porrigentiformis)	
Lancastrian whitebeam	Aria lancastriensis (previously Sorbus lancastriensis)	
Rock whitebeam	Aria rupicola (previously Sorbus rupicola)	
Bloody whitebeam	Aria vexans (previously Sorbus vexans)	
Sharp-toothed whitebeam, Sell's whitebeam	Karpatiosorbus sellii (previously Sorbus decipiens sensu P.D.Sell, Sorbus sellii)	*
Somerset whitebeam	Karpatiosorbus subcuneata (previously Sorbus subcuneata)	
Devon whitebeam (otmast)	Karpatiosorbus devoniensis (previously Sorbus devoniensis)	
Orange-berried whitebeam	Karpatiosorbus croceocarpa (previously Sorbus croceocarpa)	*
Bristol whitebeam	Karpatiosorbus bristoliensis (previously Sorbus bristoliensis)	
Service tree of Fontainebleau	Karpatiosorbus latifolia (previously Sorbus latifolia)	*
Watersmeet whitebeam	Karpatiosorbus admonitor (previously Sorbus admonitor)	
Houston's whitebeam	Karpatiosorbus houstoniae (previously Sorbus houstoniae)	
Wild service-tree	Torminalis glaberrima (previously Sorbus torminalis)	
Red chokeberry	Aronia arbutifolia	*
Black chokeberry	Aronia melanocarpa	*
Juneberry	Amelanchier lamarckii	*
Stranvaesia	Photinia davidiana	*
One-stoned cotoneaster	Cotoneaster monopyrenus	*
Lindley's cotoneaster	Cotoneaster ellipticus	*
Circular-leaved cotoneaster	Cotoneaster hissaricus	*
Black-grape cotoneaster	Cotoneaster ignotus	*
Purpleberry cotoneaster	Cotoneaster affinis	*
Dartford cotoneaster	Cotoneaster obtusus	*
Open-fruited cotoneaster	Cotoneaster bacillaris	*
Godalming cotoneaster	Cotoneaster transens	*
Tree cotoneaster	Cotoneaster frigidus	*
Willow-leaved cotoneaster	Cotoneaster salicifolius	*
Bearberry cotoneaster	Cotoneaster dammeri	*
Silverleaf cotoneaster	Cotoneaster pannosus	*
Late cotoneaster	Cotoneaster lacteus	*
Procumbent cotoneaster	Cotoneaster prostratus	*
Congested cotoneaster	Cotoneaster congestus	*
Entire-leaved cotoneaster	Cotoneaster integrifolius	*
Thyme-leaved cotoneaster	Cotoneaster linearifolius	*
Tibetan cotoneaster	Cotoneaster conspicuus	*
Kashmir cotoneaster	Cotoneaster cashmiriensis	*
Distichous cotoneaster	Cotoneaster nitidus	*
Wall cotoneaster	Cotoneaster horizontalis	*
Hjelmqvist's cotoneaster	Cotoneaster hjelmqvistii	*
Purple-flowered cotoneaster	Cotoneaster atropurpureus	*
Creeping cotoneaster	Cotoneaster adpressus	*
Spreading cotoneaster	Cotoneaster divaricatus	*
Few-flowered cotoneaster	Cotoneaster nitens	*
Shiny cotoneaster	Cotoneaster lucidus	*
Lleyn cotoneaster	Cotoneaster villosulus	*
Ampfield cotoneaster	Cotoneaster laetevirens	*
Wild cotoneaster	Cotoneaster cambricus	
Mucronate cotoneaster	Cotoneaster mucronatus	*
Himalayan cotoneaster	Cotoneaster simonsii	*
Hollyberry cotoneaster	Cotoneaster bullatus	*
Bullate cotoneaster	Cotoneaster rehderi	*
Moupin cotoneaster	Cotoneaster moupinensis	*
Diel's cotoneaster	Cotoneaster dielsianus	*
Showy cotoneaster	Cotoneaster splendens	*
Franchet's cotoneaster	Cotoneaster franchetii	*
Stern's cotoneaster	Cotoneaster sternianus	*
Engraved cotoneaster	Cotoneaster insculptus	*
Beautiful cotoneaster	Cotoneaster amoenus	*
Cherryred cotoneaster	Cotoneaster zabelii	*
Firethorn	Pyracantha coccinea	*
Asian firethorn	Pyracantha rogersiana	*
Medlar	Mespilus germanica	*
Hairy cockspurthorn	Crataegus submollis	*
Large-flowered cockspurthorn	Crataegus coccinioides	*
Pear-fruited cockspurthorn	Crataegus pedicellata	*
Cockspurthorn	Crataegus crus-galli	*
Broad-leaved cockspurthorn	Crataegus persimilis	*
Round-fruited cockspurthorn	Crataegus succulenta	*
Single-seeded hawthorn	Crataegus monogyna	
Midland hawthorn	Crataegus laevigata	
Various-leaved hawthorn	Crataegus heterophylla	*
Oriental hawthorn	Crataegus orientalis	*
