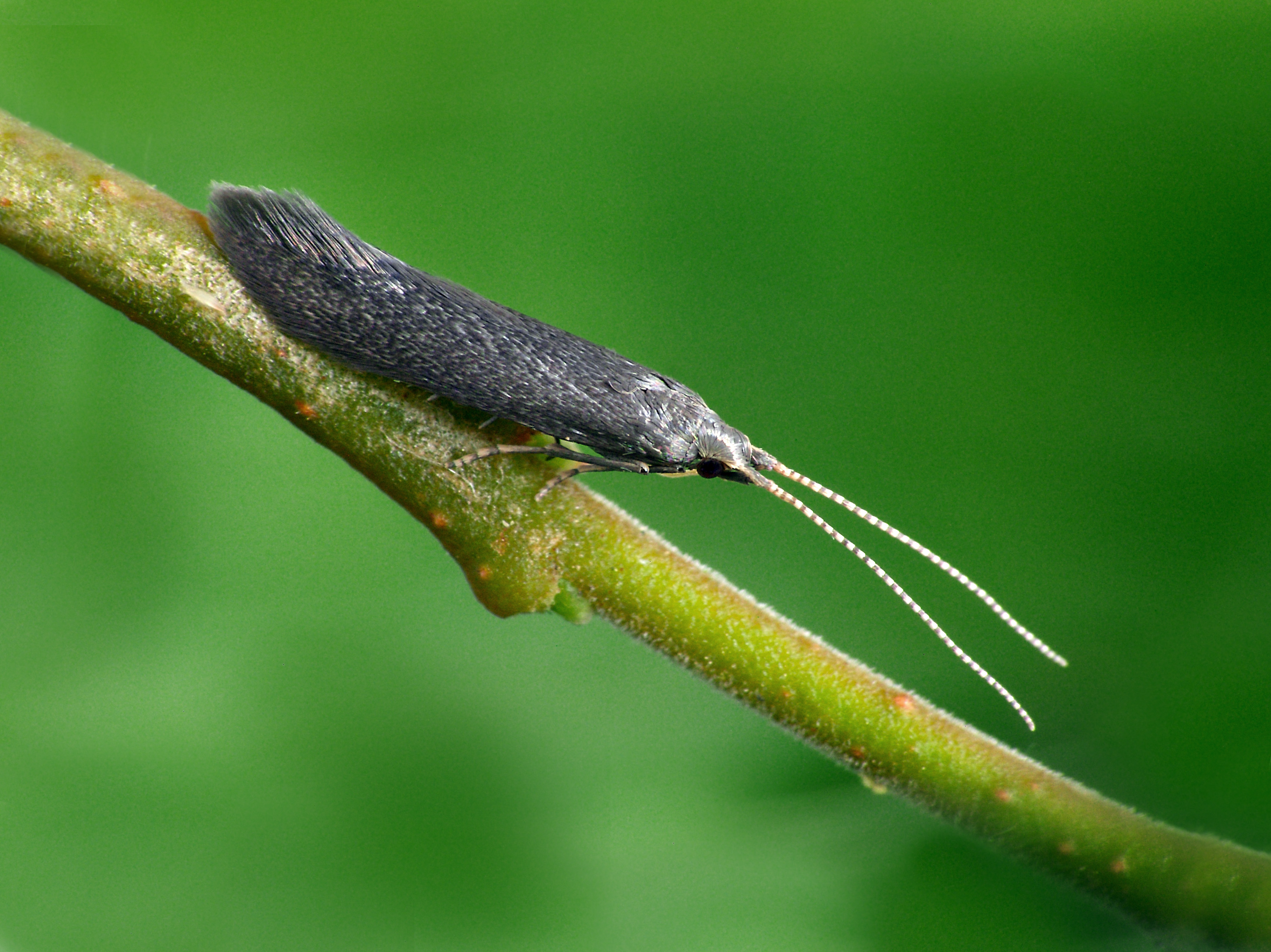

Scientific classification
- Kingdom: Animalia
- Phylum: Arthropoda
- Class: Insecta
- Order: Lepidoptera
- Family: Coleophoridae
- Genus: Coleophora
- Species: C. prunifoliae

Binomial name
- Coleophora prunifoliae Doets, 1944

= Coleophora prunifoliae =

Species of moth

Coleophora prunifoliae is a moth of the family Coleophoridae. It is found from Scandinavia to the Pyrenees, Italy and Romania and from Great Britain to southern Russia.

The wingspan is 10–12 mm.

The larvae feed on Betula, Cotoneaster franchetii, Crataegus, Cydonia oblonga, Malus domestica, Prunus armeniaca, Prunus avium, Prunus cerasus, Prunus domestica insititia, Prunus mahaleb, Prunus serrulata, Prunus spinosa, Pyracantha coccinea, Sorbus aria and Sorbus aucuparia. Full-grown larvae can be found at the end of May.
