= Bridewort =

Bridewort is a common name for several plants and may refer to:

- Filipendula ulmaria
- Spiraea salicifolia
- Spiraea alba, the pale bridewort
