= S. salicifolia =

S. salicifolia may refer to:

- Spiraea salicifolia, the bridewort spiraea, a plant species in the genus Spiraea
- Stevia salicifolia, a plant species in the genus Stevia

== See also ==
- Salicifolia (disambiguation)
