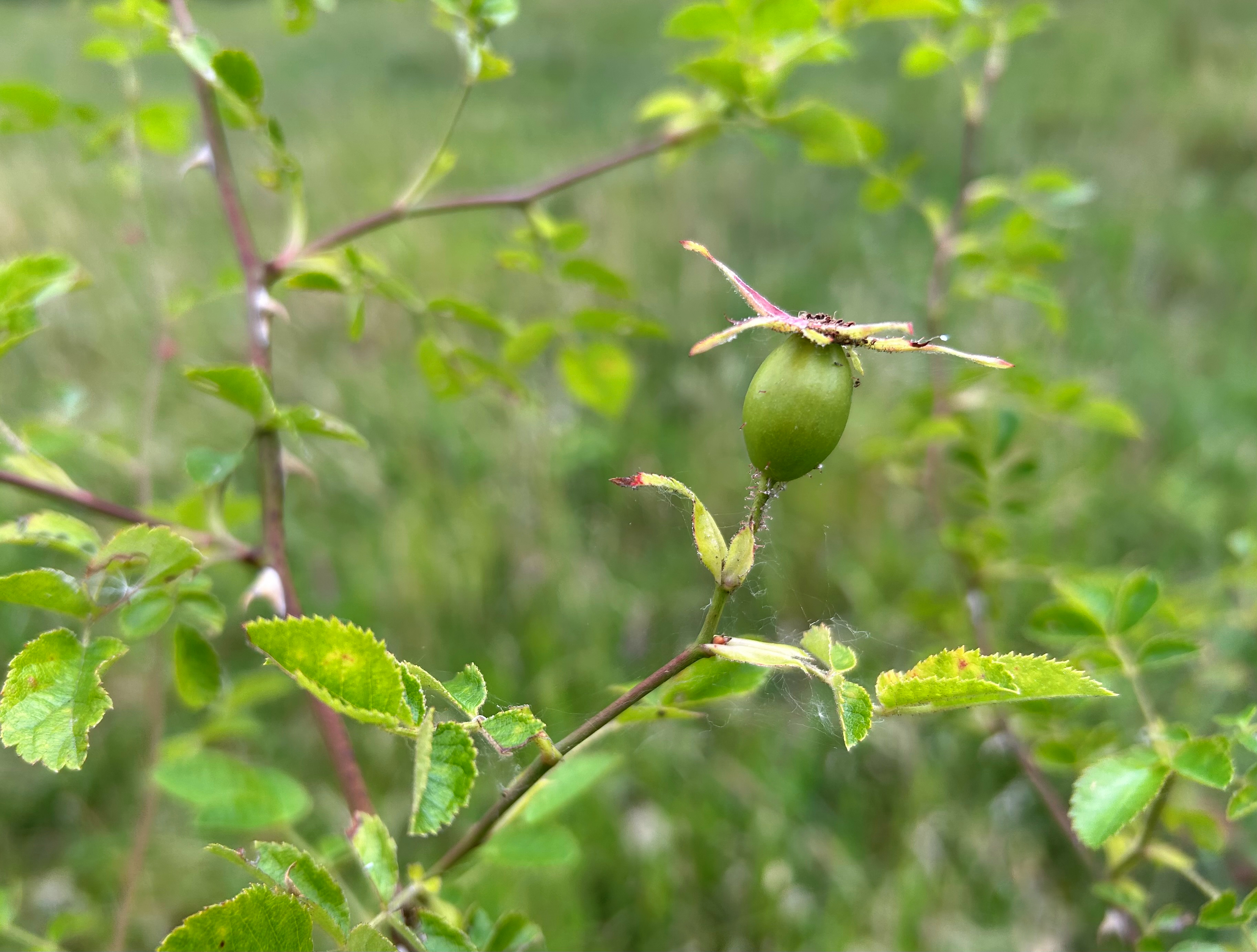
- A close-up of a fruiting specimen of the nothospecies

Scientific classification
- Kingdom: Plantae
- Clade: Tracheophytes
- Clade: Angiosperms
- Clade: Eudicots
- Clade: Rosids
- Order: Rosales
- Family: Rosaceae
- Genus: Rosa
- Species: R. × avrayensis

Binomial name
- Rosa × avrayensis Rouy & E.G.Camus

= Rosa × avrayensis =

Species of flowering plant

Rosa × avrayensis is a hybrid species of flowering plant in the family Rosaceae. It is a naturally occurring hybrid between Rosa rubiginosa and Rosa tomentosa, with the hybrid formula R. rubiginosa × R. tomentosa. This hybrid is native to parts of Western Europe, including the United Kingdom, Ireland, and France. It grows as a shrub in temperate environments.
