= Stigmella sorbi =

Scientific classification
- Kingdom: Animalia
- Phylum: Arthropoda
- Class: Insecta
- Order: Lepidoptera
- Family: Nepticulidae
- Genus: Stigmella
- Species: S. sorbi

Binomial name
- Stigmella sorbi (Stainton, 1861)

Synonyms
- Nepticula sorbi Stainton, 1861

Species of moth

Stigmella sorbi is a moth of the family Nepticulidae, described by Henry Tibbats Stainton in 1861. It is found in most of Europe, east to the eastern part of the Palearctic realm.

== Description ==
The wingspan is 6–7 mm. The thick erect hairs on the head vertex are ochreous-yellowish to fuscous. The collar is pale grey. The antennal eyecaps are whitish. The front wings are bronze-fuscous with a broad somewhat shining whitish fascia beyond middle; apical area beyond this is rather dark purplish-fuscous. Hindwings are light grey. Microscopic examination of the genitalia is essential for correct determination.

Adults are on wing in May.

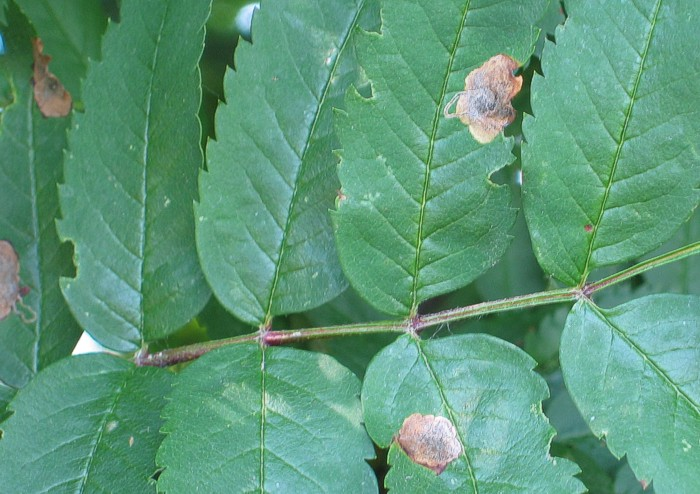
Leaf mine

Ovum

Laid on the underside of a leaflet, often close to the midrib.

Larva

The larvae feed on Amelanchier, Himalayan cotoneaster (Cotoneaster simonsii), apple (Malus domestica), rowan (Sorbus aucuparia) and Swedish whitebeam (Sorbus intermedia), mining the leaves of their host plant.

Pupa

In a brown cocoon spun on detritus.

== Distribution ==
Found across the Palearctic and most of Europe (except Iceland, Portugal, Belgium, and the western part of the Balkan Peninsula)

== Etymology ==
Stigmella sorbi was described by the English entomologist, Henry Tibbats Stainton in 1861 from a type specimen found in Scarborough, Yorkshire. The genus Stigmella – ″stigma″, refers to the conspicuous (or occasionally metallic) small dot or a brand fascia on the forewing of many of the Stigmella species, or possibly the small size of the moths. The species name sorbi – refers to rowan Sorbus aucuparia', one of the larval foodplants.
