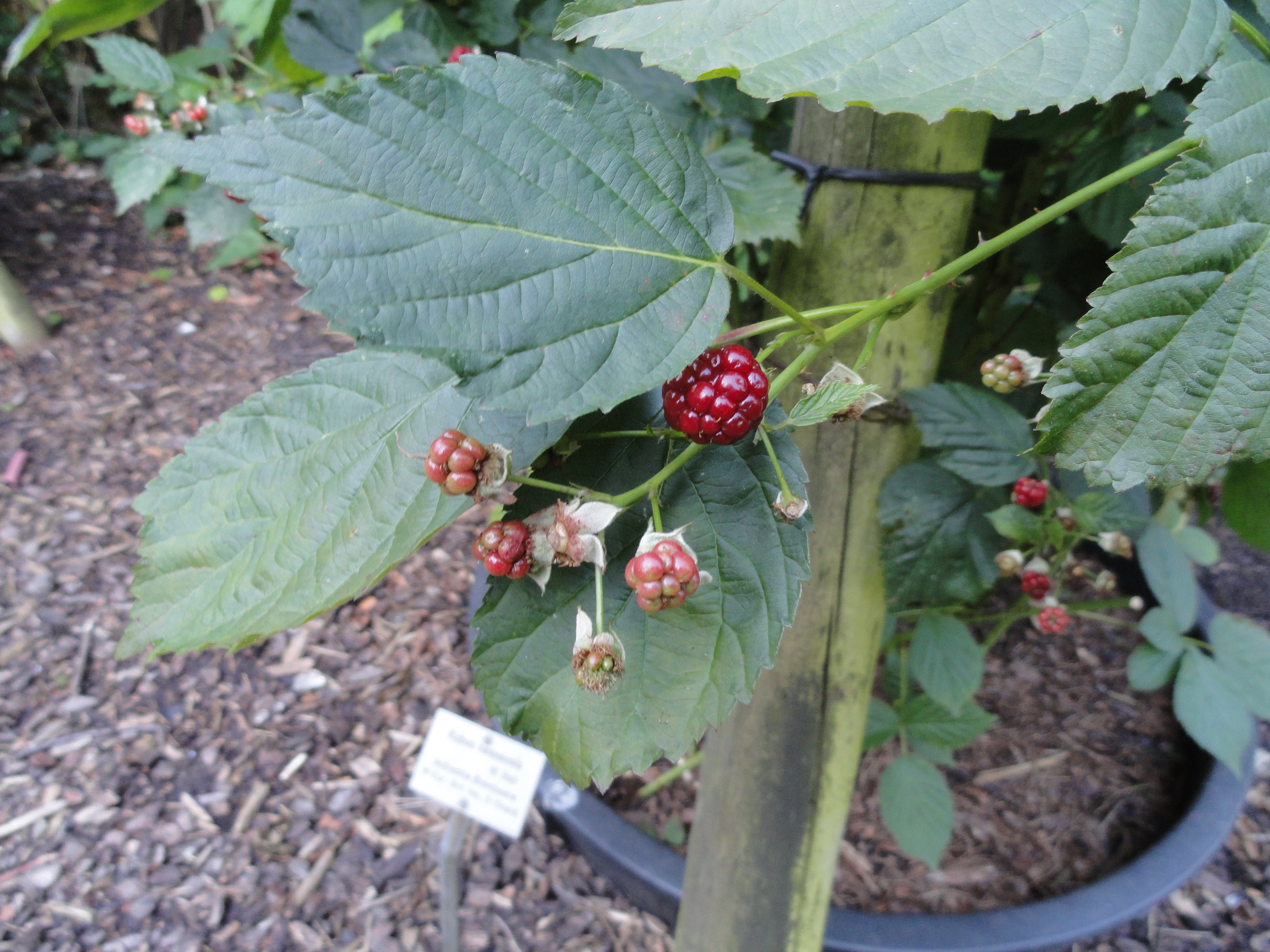

Scientific classification
- Kingdom: Plantae
- Clade: Tracheophytes
- Clade: Angiosperms
- Clade: Eudicots
- Clade: Rosids
- Order: Rosales
- Family: Rosaceae
- Genus: Rubus
- Species: R. nessensis

Binomial name
- Rubus nessensis Hall

= Rubus nessensis =

Species of flowering plant

Rubus nessensis is a species of bramble native to Northwestern Europe, including Great Britain and Ireland. Two subspecies are recognized: R. n. nessensis and R. n. cubirianus.

== Description ==
Rubus nessensis is an erect, arching shrub growing to a height of 2 (rarely 3) metres. In its more usual shaded habitat, its stem is green; plants exposed to more light have brownish stems. Purple, conical prickles are numerous on the stem. Leaves bear 5 to 7 leaflets, the terminal leaflet being around 10 cm long, among the largest in the genus. The fruit is dark red, thus distinguishing Rubus nessensis from other members of Rubus subgenus Rubus , except Rubus scissus, which lacks the conical prickles.

== Habitat and distribution ==
Rubus nessensis is found in riverside woodland, where it can dominate the ground flora. It occurs widely across Northwestern and Middle Europe. In Great Britain it has a broad distribution, with strongholds along the south coast, in South Wales, and in Argyll. Most Irish records are from the eastern half of the country.
