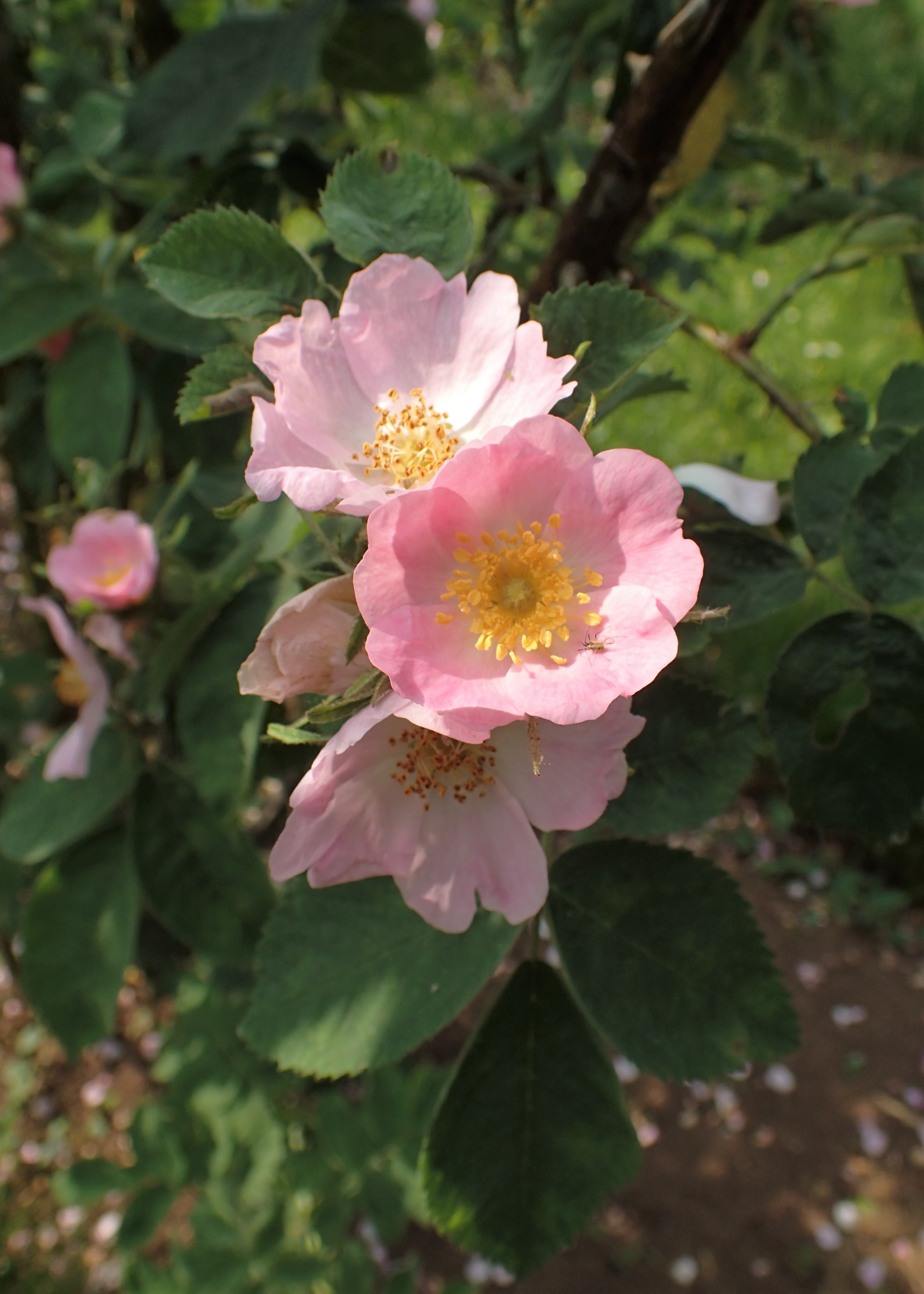
- Flowers
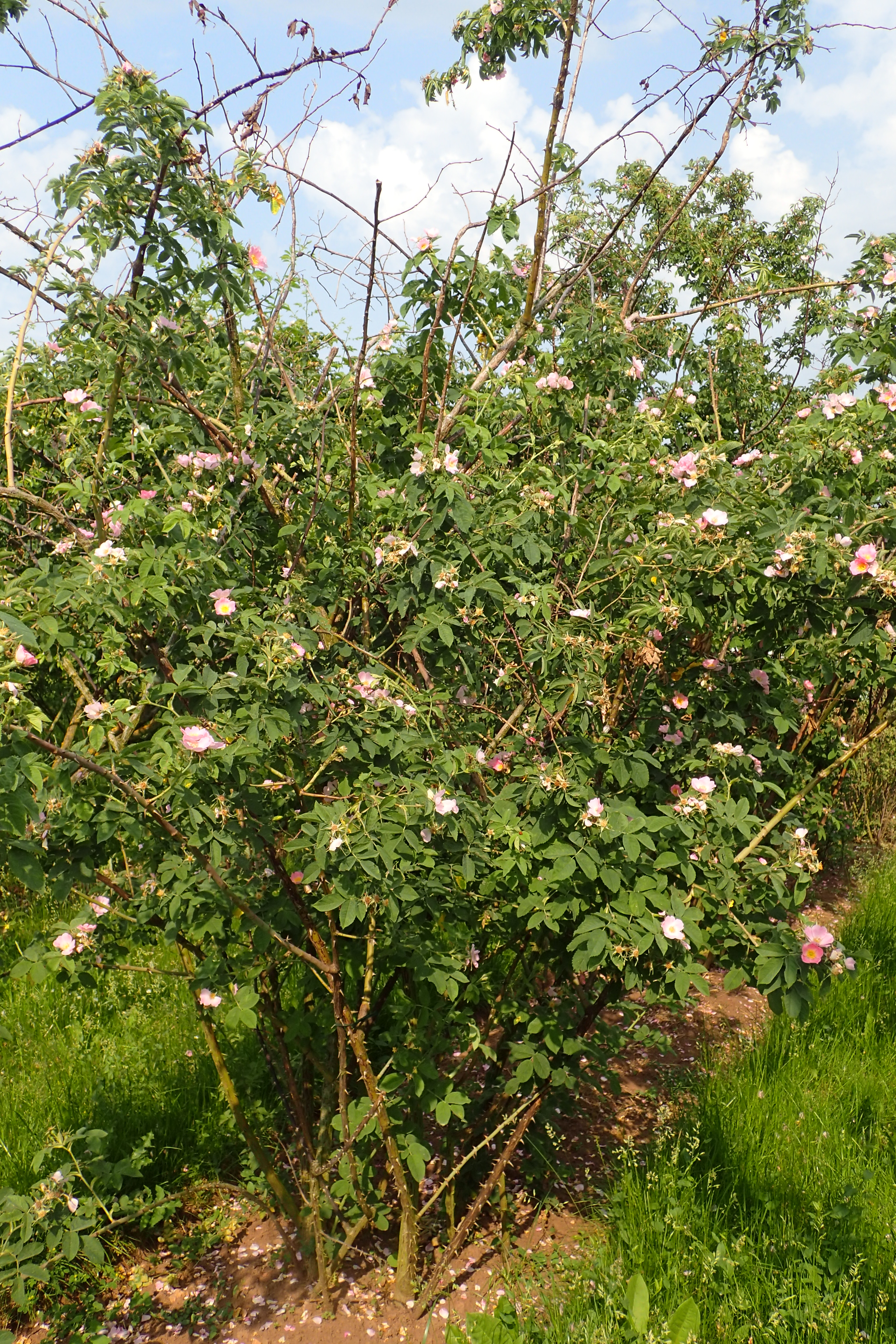
- Habit

Scientific classification
- Kingdom: Plantae
- Clade: Embryophytes
- Clade: Tracheophytes
- Clade: Spermatophytes
- Clade: Angiosperms
- Clade: Eudicots
- Clade: Rosids
- Order: Rosales
- Family: Rosaceae
- Genus: Rosa
- Species: R. sherardii

Binomial name
- Rosa sherardii Davies

Synonyms
- List: Rosa aculeatior Lindstr.; Rosa collivaga Cottet ex Crép.; Rosa cuspidatoides Scheutz; Rosa cuspidatoides Crép.; Rosa cuspidatoides var. aberrans Scheutz; Rosa cuspidatoides var. elatior Scheutz; Rosa cuspidatoides var. erioclada Boullu; Rosa cuspidatoides var. minor Scheutz; Rosa gillotii Déségl. & Lucand; Rosa mollissima microgene eminens Hesl.-Harr.; Rosa mollissima f. geisingensis J.B.Keller & Wiesb.; Rosa mollissima subsp. resinoides Crép.) Nyman; Rosa omissa Déségl.; Rosa omissa f. albiflora G.Gaillard ex R.Keller; Rosa omissa var. collivaga Cottet ex Crép.) R.Keller; Rosa omissa f. danica Frid.) E.W.Christ.; Rosa omissa var. gallicoides M.Schulze) R.Keller; Rosa omissa var. geisingensis J.B.Keller & Wiesb.) R.Keller; Rosa omissa f. gillotii Déségl. & Lucand) Boullu; Rosa omissa var. gillotii Déségl. & Lucand) Boullu; Rosa omissa subvar. gillotii Déségl. & Lucand) R.Keller; Rosa omissa var. lutzei Sagorski ex R.Keller; Rosa omissa f. megalacantha R.Keller; Rosa omissa var. misniensis R.Keller; Rosa omissa var. resinosoides Crép.) R.Keller; Rosa omissa var. schulzei R.Keller; Rosa omissa var. stenophylla R.Keller; Rosa omissa var. submollis Wolley-Dod; Rosa omissa subvar. tunoniensis Déségl.) R.Keller; Rosa omissa var. typica R.Keller; Rosa omissa f. viadrae E.Schenk; Rosa oskolensis Buzunova & Grigorj.; Rosa pomifera subsp. omissa Déségl.) Schwertschl.; Rosa pseudocuspidata var. karstiana Borbás; Rosa resinosoides Crép.; Rosa resinosoides f. heteracantha Gillot; Rosa resinosoides var. leiocarpa Boullu; Rosa seringeana Godr.; Rosa seringeana var. karstiana Borbás) Borbás; Rosa sherardii var. aciculifera Herring; Rosa sherardii f. alba Lange) Herring; Rosa sherardii f. albida Herring; Rosa sherardii f. calvissima R.Keller) Popek; Rosa sherardii var. collivaga Cottet ex Crép.) Boulenger; Rosa sherardii var. danica Frid.) Herring; Rosa sherardii var. eminens Hesl.-Harr.) Wolley-Dod; Rosa sherardii var. enneaphylla Herring; Rosa sherardii f. neoburgensis Herring; Rosa sherardii var. omissa Déségl.) Wolley-Dod; Rosa sherardii var. pseudofarinosa R.Keller) Popek; Rosa sherardii var. resinosoides Crép.) Herring; Rosa sherardii f. resinosoides Crép.) Wolley-Dod; Rosa sherardii f. sacra Gelert) Herring; Rosa sherardii var. typica Wolley-Dod; Rosa sherardii f. umbelliflora Scheutz) Popek; Rosa sherardii var. umbelliflora Scheutz) Herring; Rosa sherardii f. uncinata Lees) Wolley-Dod; Rosa sherardii var. venusta Herring; Rosa strengnensis Lindstr.; Rosa submollis Ley; Rosa tomentosa f. calvissima R.Keller; Rosa tomentosa f. danica Frid.; Rosa tomentosa f. gallicoides M.Schulze; Rosa tomentosa subsp. omissa Déségl.) Rouy & E.G.Camus; Rosa tomentosa subsp. omissa Déségl.) P.Parm.; Rosa tomentosa sacra Gelert; Rosa tomentosa subsp. sherardii Davies) A.Pedersen; Rosa tomentosa var. alba Lange; Rosa tomentosa var. cuspidatoides Crép.) R.Keller; Rosa tomentosa var. gillotii Déségl. & Lucand) Rouy & E.G.Camus; Rosa tomentosa var. littoralis Corb.; Rosa tomentosa var. omissa Déségl.) Scheutz; Rosa tomentosa var. pseudofarinosa R.Keller; Rosa tomentosa var. resinosoides Crép.) Rouy & E.G.Camus; Rosa tomentosa var. seringeana Godr.) Dumort.; Rosa tomentosa var. tunoniensis Déségl.) Rouy & E.G.Camus; Rosa tomentosa subvar. umbelliflora Scheutz) R.Keller; Rosa tomentosa var. umbelliflora Scheutz) Matsson; Rosa tomentosa var. uncinata Lees; Rosa tunoniensis Déségl.; Rosa umbelliflora Scheutz; Rosa umbelliflora var. aberrans Scheutz; Rosa umbelliflora var. cuspidatoides Crép.) Heinr.Braun; Rosa umbelliflora var. elatior Scheutz; Rosa umbelliflora var. minor Scheutz; Rosa umbelliflora subsp. sudetica Heinr.Braun; Rosa uncinata Ley; Rosa venusta Christ; Rosa villosa subsp. omissa Déségl.) K.Bertsch & F.Bertsch.; Rosa villosa f. resinosoides Crép.) Hesl.-Harr.; Rosa villosa subsp. sherardii Davies) Hesl.-Harr.; Rosa villosa var. eminens Hesl.-Harr.) Hesl.-Harr.; Rosa villosa var. omissa Déségl.) Hesl.-Harr.; Rosa villosa var. submollis Wolley-Dod) Hesl.-Harr.; Rosa villosa var. uncinata Lees) Hesl.-Harr.

= Rosa sherardii =

Species of plant

Rosa sherardii (syn. Rosa omissa), the northern downy rose or Sherard's downy-rose, is a species of flowering plant in the family Rosaceae. A shrub reaching 2 m (7 ft), it is native to cooler parts of Europe, and has been introduced to the US state of Vermont. In the garden it prefers a sheltered location in full sun with moist but well-drained soil. More compact than Rosa tomentosa, its grey-leaved form in particular is considered under-represented in cultivation.

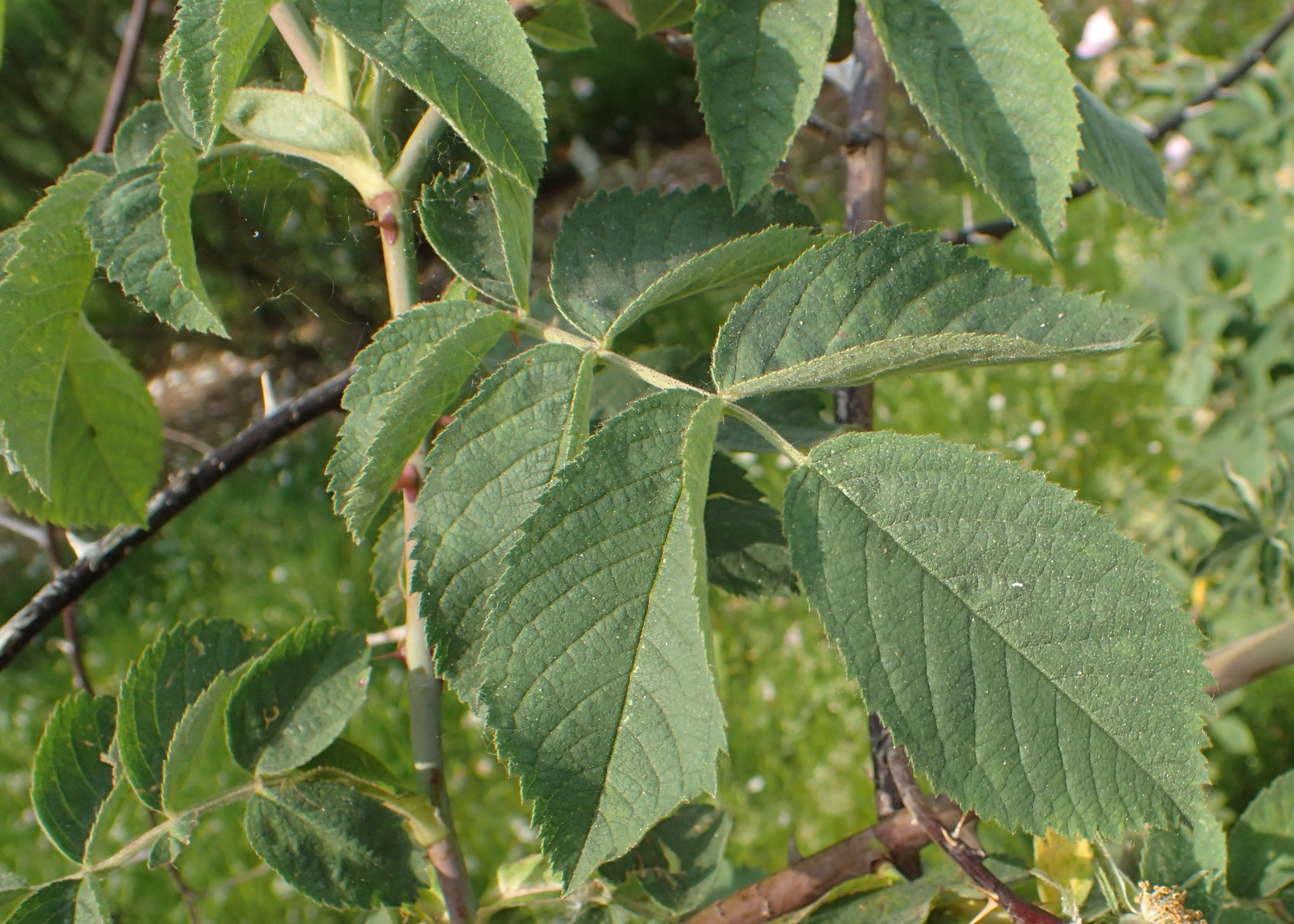
Leaves

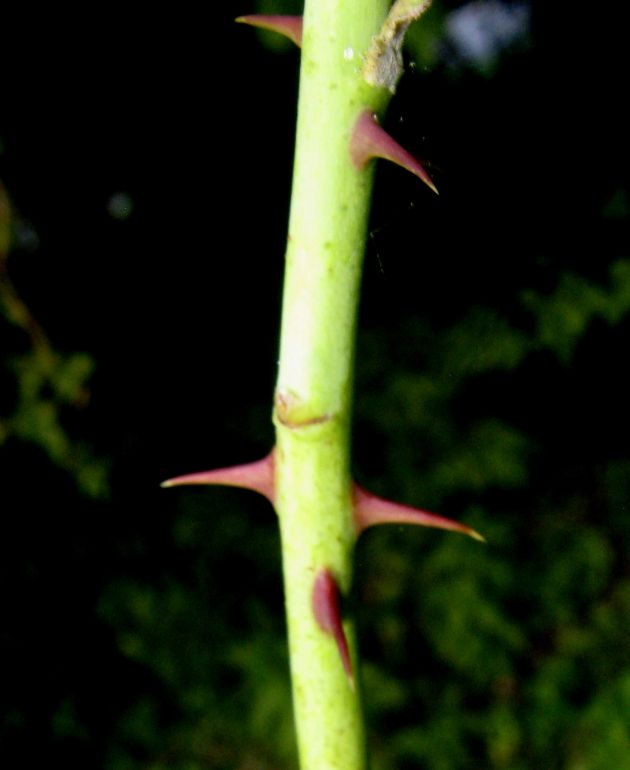
Prickles

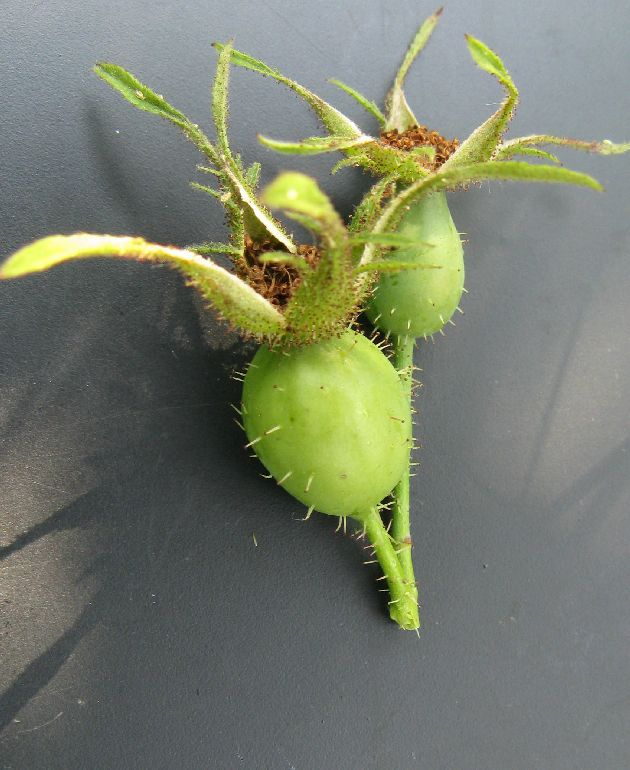
Unripe hips

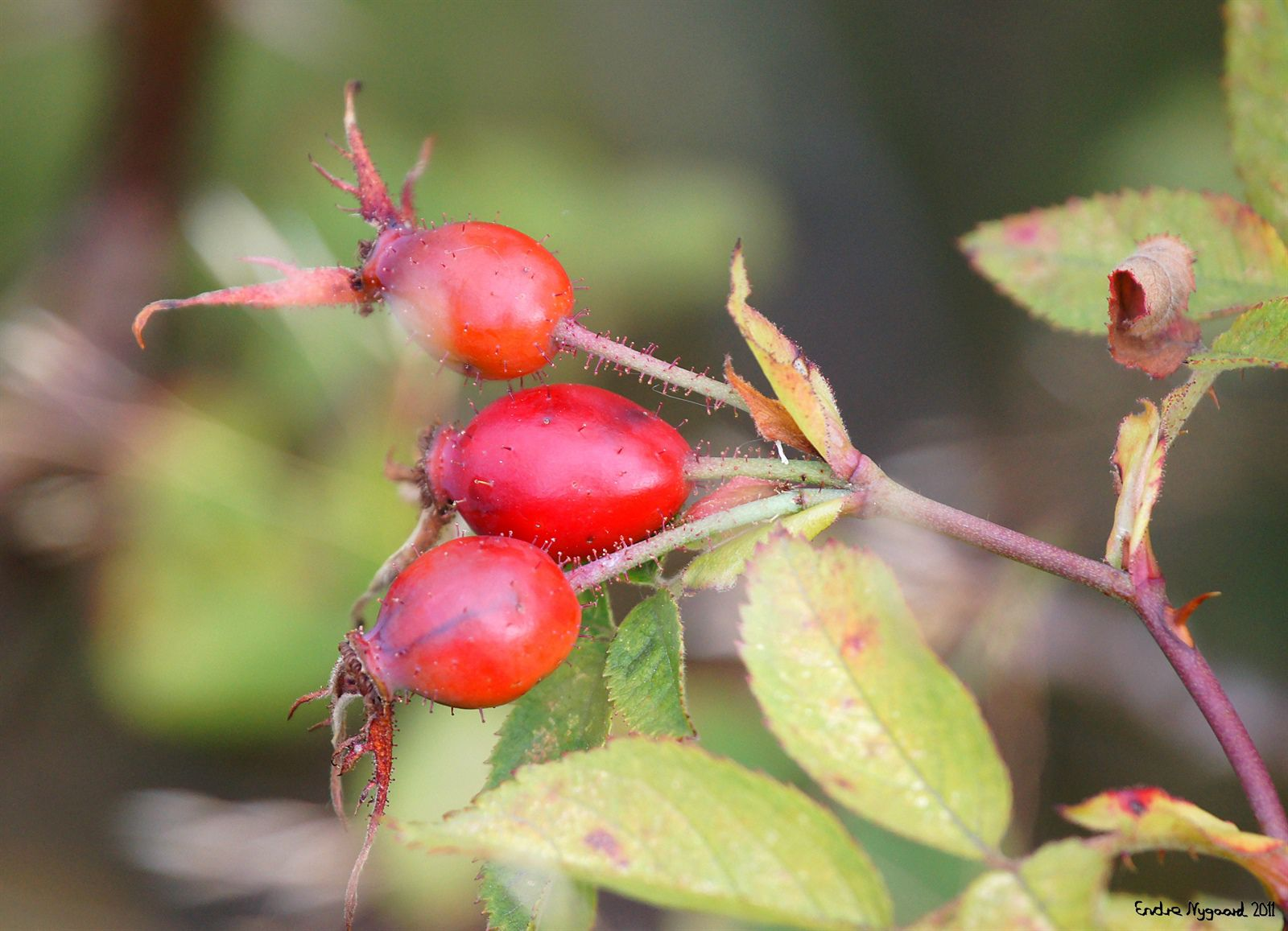
Ripe hips
