= Rubus dasyphyllus =

- Leaves and fruit, Ormskirk, United Kingdom

Scientific classification
- Kingdom: Plantae
- Clade: Tracheophytes
- Clade: Angiosperms
- Clade: Eudicots
- Clade: Rosids
- Order: Rosales
- Family: Rosaceae
- Genus: Rubus
- Species: R. dasyphyllus

Binomial name
- Rubus dasyphyllus (W.M.Rogers) E.S.Marshall

Species of flowering plant

Rubus dasyphyllus is a species of bramble found in northwest Europe.

== Description ==
Rubus dasyphyllus is an arching shrub with a hairy, reddish stem. The stem bears numerous prickles and pricklets, ranging in length from 1 to 8 millimetres (1/16 to 5/16 in). Glands, both stalked and sessile, are also numerous on the stem. The leaves are divided into 3–5 leaflets; these are light glossy green and hairless above, and greyish and downy below.

The flowers are pink, about 2.5 centimetres (1 in) in diameter, and form a compact terminal inflorescence, with smaller axillary inflorescences.

== Distribution and habitat ==
The species is found in northwest Europe, including Belgium, Denmark, Germany, the Netherlands, and the British Isles. It is one of the commonest brambles in parts of Great Britain, particularly in Wales, and northern England; it is absent from the Scottish Highlands and the southern half of Ireland. Its range extends to Germany in the east. It may be extinct in Sweden.
