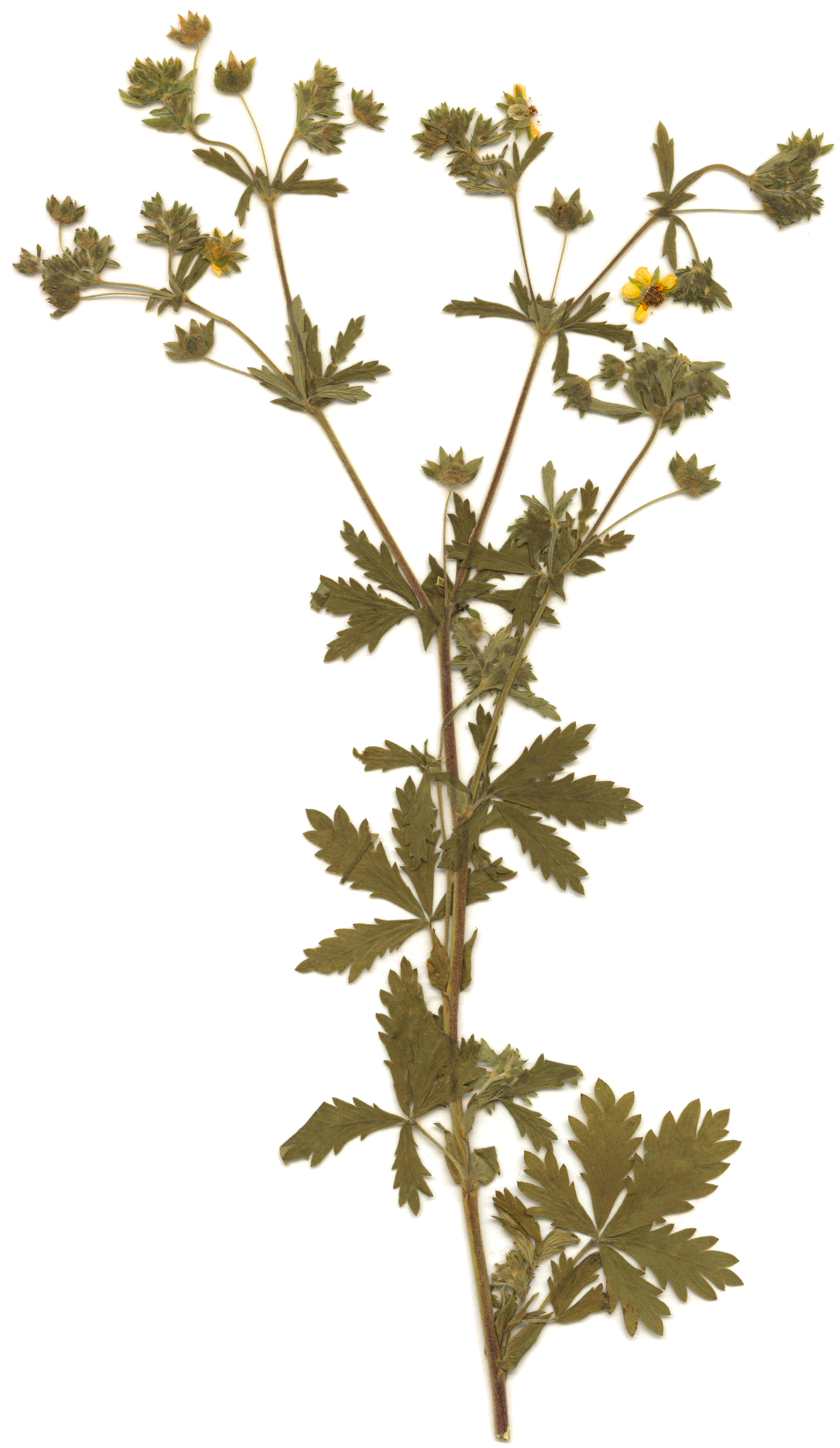

Scientific classification
- Kingdom: Plantae
- Clade: Tracheophytes
- Clade: Angiosperms
- Clade: Eudicots
- Clade: Rosids
- Order: Rosales
- Family: Rosaceae
- Genus: Potentilla
- Species: P. intermedia

Binomial name
- Potentilla intermedia L.

= Potentilla intermedia =

Species of flowering plant

Potentilla intermedia is a species of flowering plant belonging to the family Rosaceae.

Its native range is Poland to Russian Far East.
