= Rubus septentrionalis =

Scientific classification
- Kingdom: Plantae
- Clade: Embryophytes
- Clade: Tracheophytes
- Clade: Spermatophytes
- Clade: Angiosperms
- Clade: Eudicots
- Clade: Rosids
- Order: Rosales
- Family: Rosaceae
- Genus: Rubus
- Species: R. septentrionalis

Binomial name
- Rubus septentrionalis W.C.R.Watson

Species of plant

Rubus septentrionalis is a species of bramble widely distributed in Northern Europe at higher latitudes.

== Description ==
Rubus septentrionalis is an arching shrub with a dark red, furrowed stem. This stem bears numerous robust prickles, which can be longer than the stem diameter. The leaves have 5 dark green, usually hairy leaflets. The flowers can be white or light pink.

== Distribution and habitat ==
The species is widely distributed in Northern Europe (Denmark, Great Britain, Ireland, Norway, and Sweden). It grows at higher latitudes than most other brambles.

It is a plant of streamsides, woodland edges and stony ground. It is intolerant of heavy shade. In Ireland and Great Britain, its distribution is rather scattered, except in Scotland, where it is common. It is one of the few Rubus species that grow in the extreme north of Britain, with multiple records from the Hebrides, Orkneys, and Caithness.
