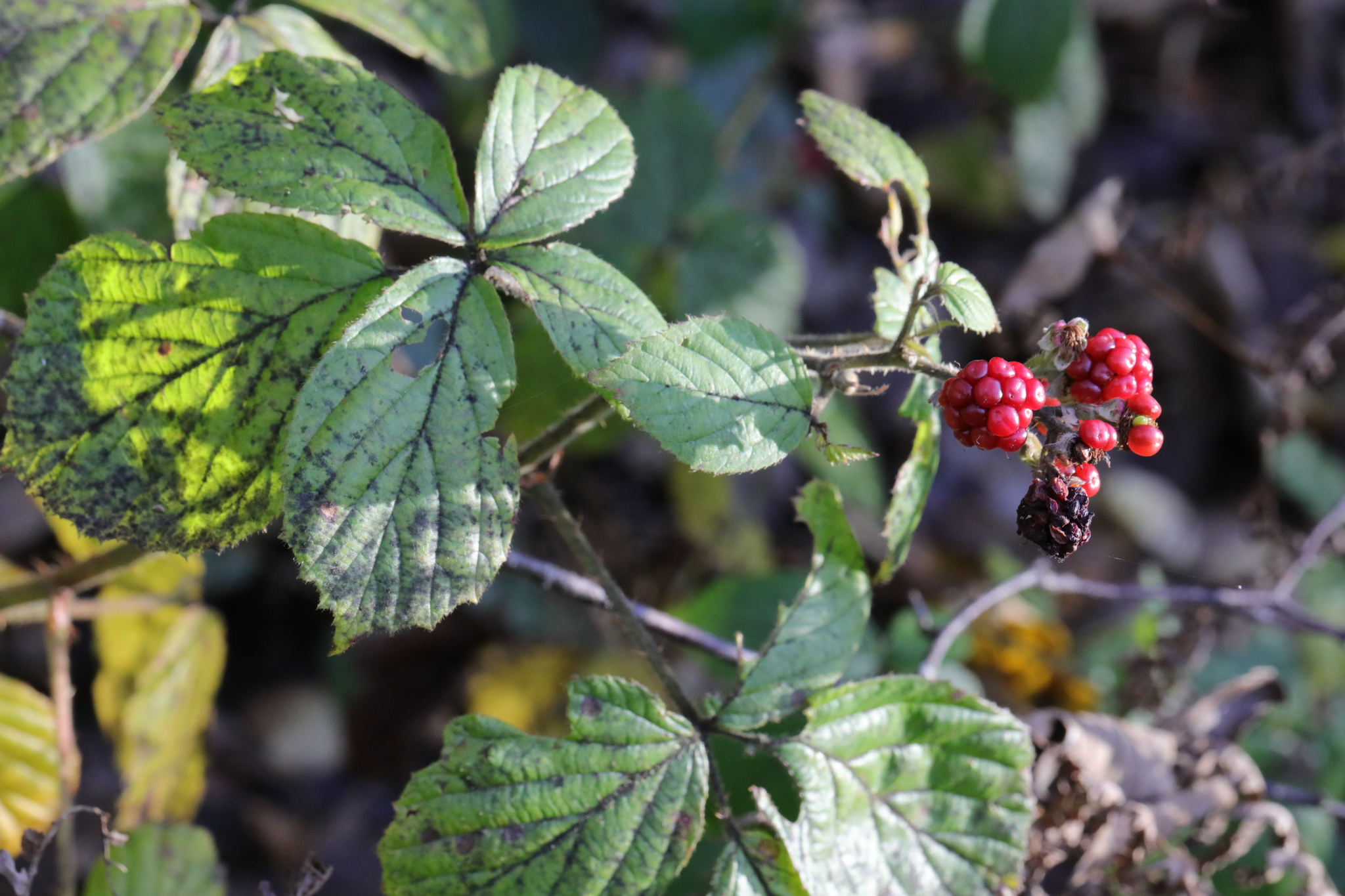
- In Cheshire

Scientific classification
- Kingdom: Plantae
- Clade: Embryophytes
- Clade: Tracheophytes
- Clade: Spermatophytes
- Clade: Angiosperms
- Clade: Eudicots
- Clade: Rosids
- Order: Rosales
- Family: Rosaceae
- Genus: Rubus
- Species: R. calvatus

Binomial name
- Rubus calvatus A. Bloxam

= Rubus calvatus =

Species of flowering plant

Rubus calvatus is a species of bramble endemic to the British Isles.

== Description ==
Rubus calvatus is a shrub with a red, furrowed, arching stem which bears numerous prickles. Each leaf has five non-overlapping leaflets; these are deep green and hairless above. The flowers are pink, and the fruit develops from September on.

== Distribution ==
The species is found in scattered sites in England, eastern Wales, and the northeast of Ireland. The greatest concentration of locations are in the Pennines and Peak District in England.
