= Rubus tuberculatus =

Scientific classification
- Kingdom: Plantae
- Clade: Tracheophytes
- Clade: Angiosperms
- Clade: Eudicots
- Clade: Rosids
- Order: Rosales
- Family: Rosaceae
- Genus: Rubus
- Species: R. tuberculatus

Binomial name
- Rubus tuberculatus Bab.

Species of fruit and plant

Rubus tuberculatus is a bramble found in parts of northwest Europe, including Britain and Ireland.

== Description ==
Rubus tuberculatus is a low-arching shrub, with distinctive two-toned stems; the sheltered side is green, while the exposed side is matte red. The stem bears abundant prickles, noticeably more than most other Rubi
