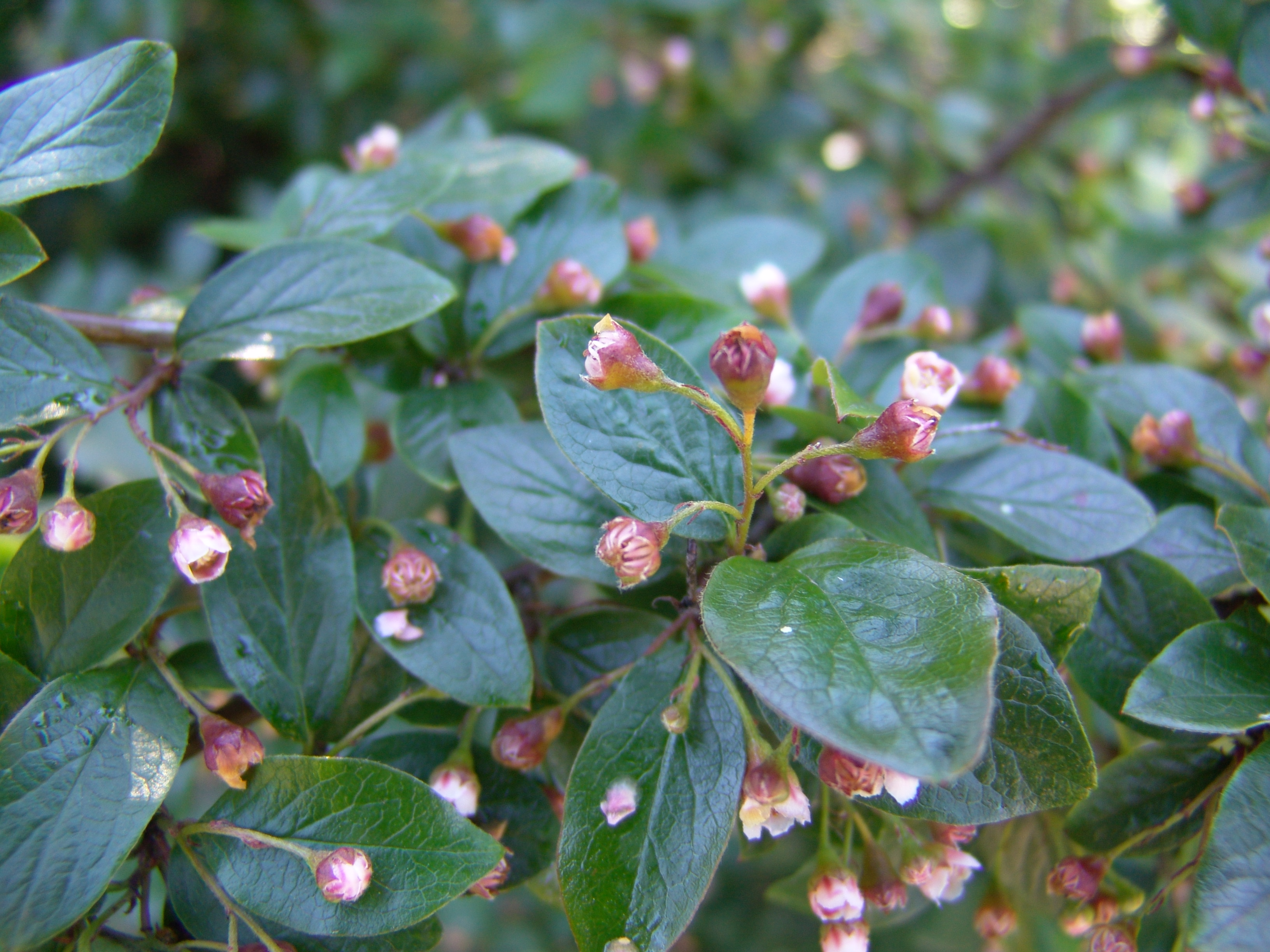
- In bloom in Iceland

Scientific classification
- Kingdom: Plantae
- Clade: Tracheophytes
- Clade: Angiosperms
- Clade: Eudicots
- Clade: Rosids
- Order: Rosales
- Family: Rosaceae
- Genus: Cotoneaster
- Species: C. lucidus

Binomial name
- Cotoneaster lucidus Schltdl.

Synonyms
- Cotoneaster acutifolius var. lucidus (Schltdl.) L.T.Lu

= Cotoneaster lucidus =

Species of flowering plant

Cotoneaster lucidus, the shiny cotoneaster, or hedge cotoneaster, is a deciduous, medium-sized shrub with long, spreading branches reaching heights (and breadths) of 6' to 10'. It is native to parts of northern Asia, and adapted to tolerate colder weather (to zone 4). C. lucidus was described in 1856 by Diederich Franz Leonhard von Schlechtendal. Some authorities consider it to be a synonym of Cotoneaster acutifolius, the Peking cotoneaster.

== Identification ==
=== Leaves and branches ===
The leaves of Cotoneaster lucidus are dark green (changing yellow to red in autumn), simple, ovate, about 1" to 2.5" long and up to 1" wide, having pubescence on their undersides and growing in an alternate pattern along its stems. Branches are tolerant of pruning.

=== Flowers ===
Flowers are a pale-pink, small and clustered blooming in early June. Flower buds are imbricate, appressed with loose exposed outer scales.

=== Fruit ===
Cotoneaster lucidus grows an attractive, blackish pome fruit, about half an inch in diameter, which ripens between September and October.

=== Bark ===
The bark is tan in color, with lenticels on slender stems which have a pattern resembling fishbone.

=== Roots ===
Despite its sparse root system, Cotoneaster lucidus holds up well in persistent winds thus making it a good hedging plant. It grows particularly well in well-drained, loose soil, but soil pH can vary.

== Propagation ==
Cotoneaster lucidus can be propagated by cuttings or by seed, with stratification necessary in the case of the latter.

== Pests ==
Cotoneaster lucidus is prone to fireblight, leaf spot, scale insects and spider mites.
