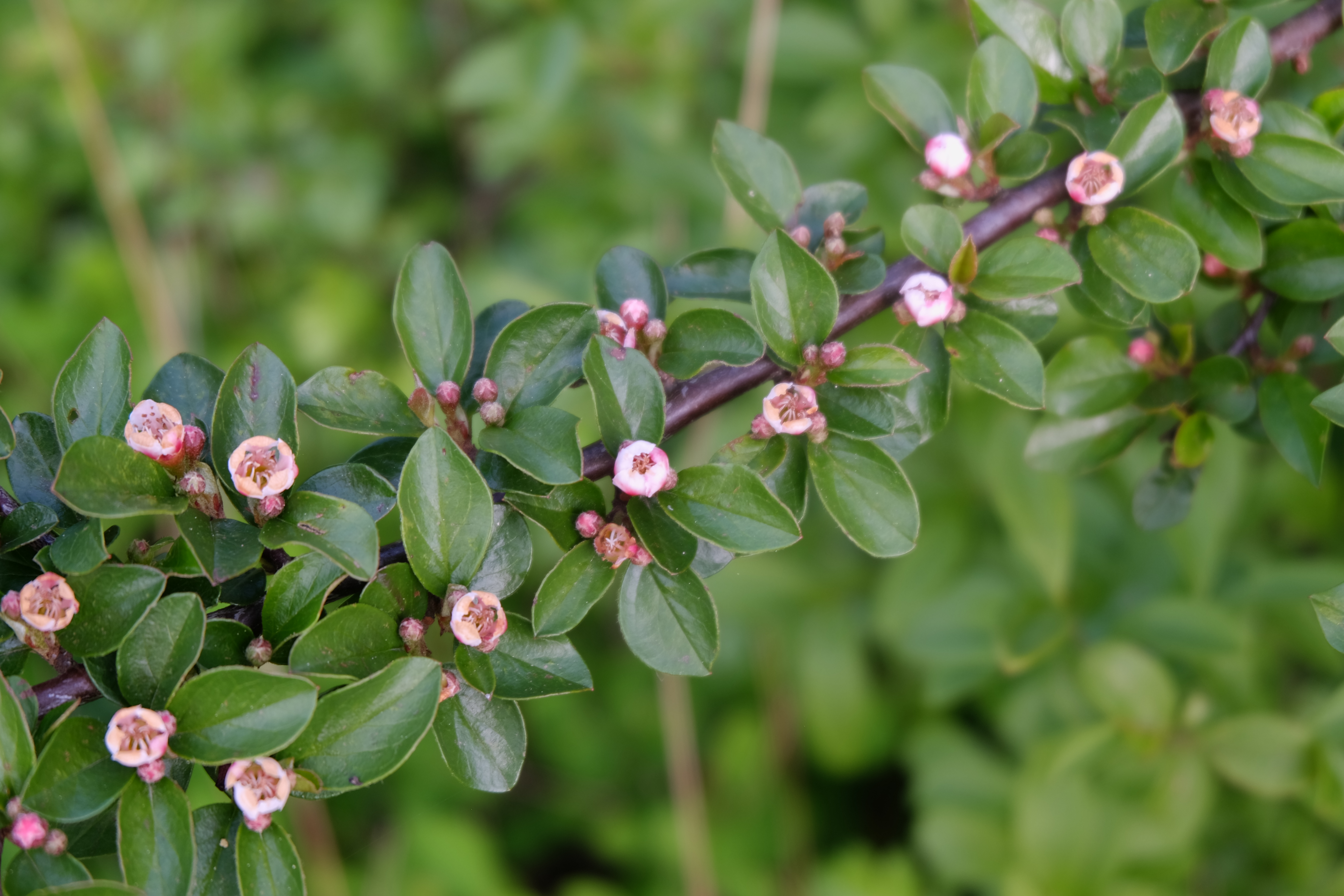
- Flower buds

Scientific classification
- Kingdom: Plantae
- Clade: Tracheophytes
- Clade: Angiosperms
- Clade: Eudicots
- Clade: Rosids
- Order: Rosales
- Family: Rosaceae
- Genus: Cotoneaster
- Species: C. divaricatus

Binomial name
- Cotoneaster divaricatus Rehder & E.H.Wilson

Synonyms
- Pyrus divaricata (Rehder & E.H.Wilson) M.F.Fay & Christenh.

= Cotoneaster divaricatus =

Species of plant in the rose family

Cotoneaster divaricatus, the spreading cotoneaster, is a species of flowering plant in the family Rosaceae. It is native to China, and has been introduced to Ontario in Canada, the Midwest United States, northern and central Europe, Kenya, and the South Island of New Zealand. A shrub reaching 1.8 m (6 ft) tall but spreading to 2.4 m (8 ft), and hardy in USDA zones 4 through 7, it is considered a valuable landscaping plant by the Missouri Botanical Garden. The Centre for Agriculture and Bioscience International lists it in its Invasive Species Compendium.

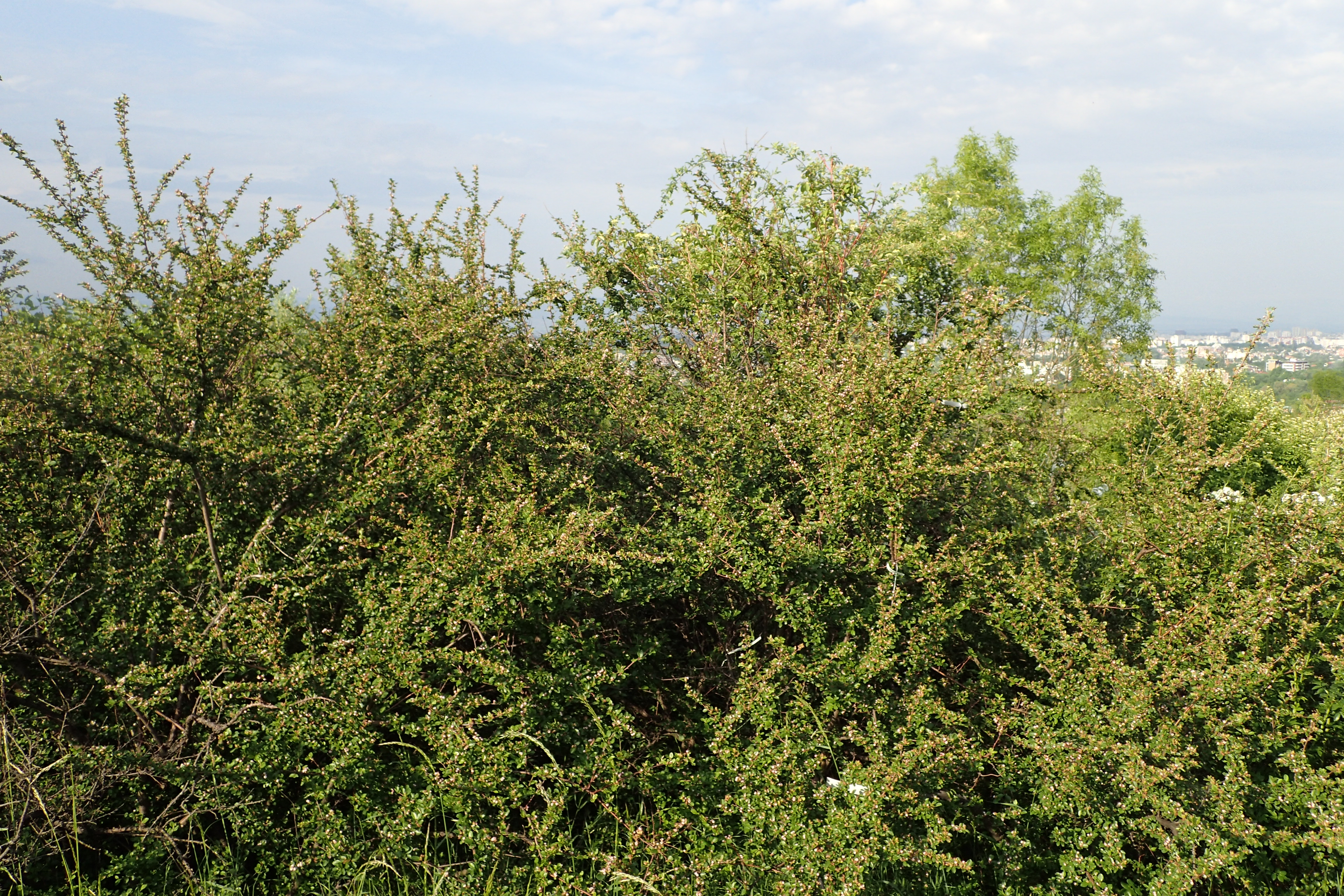
Forming a hedge

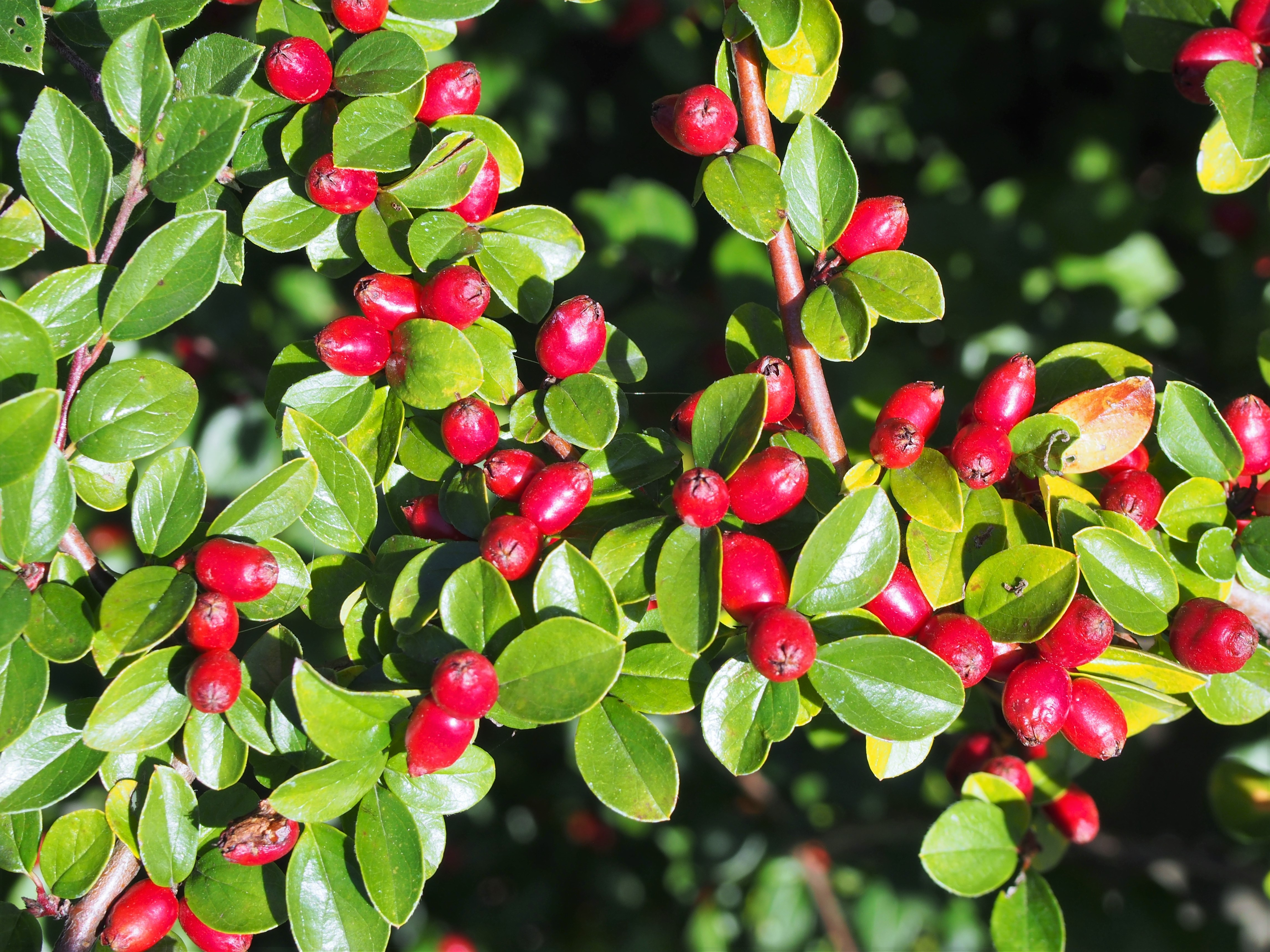
In fruit

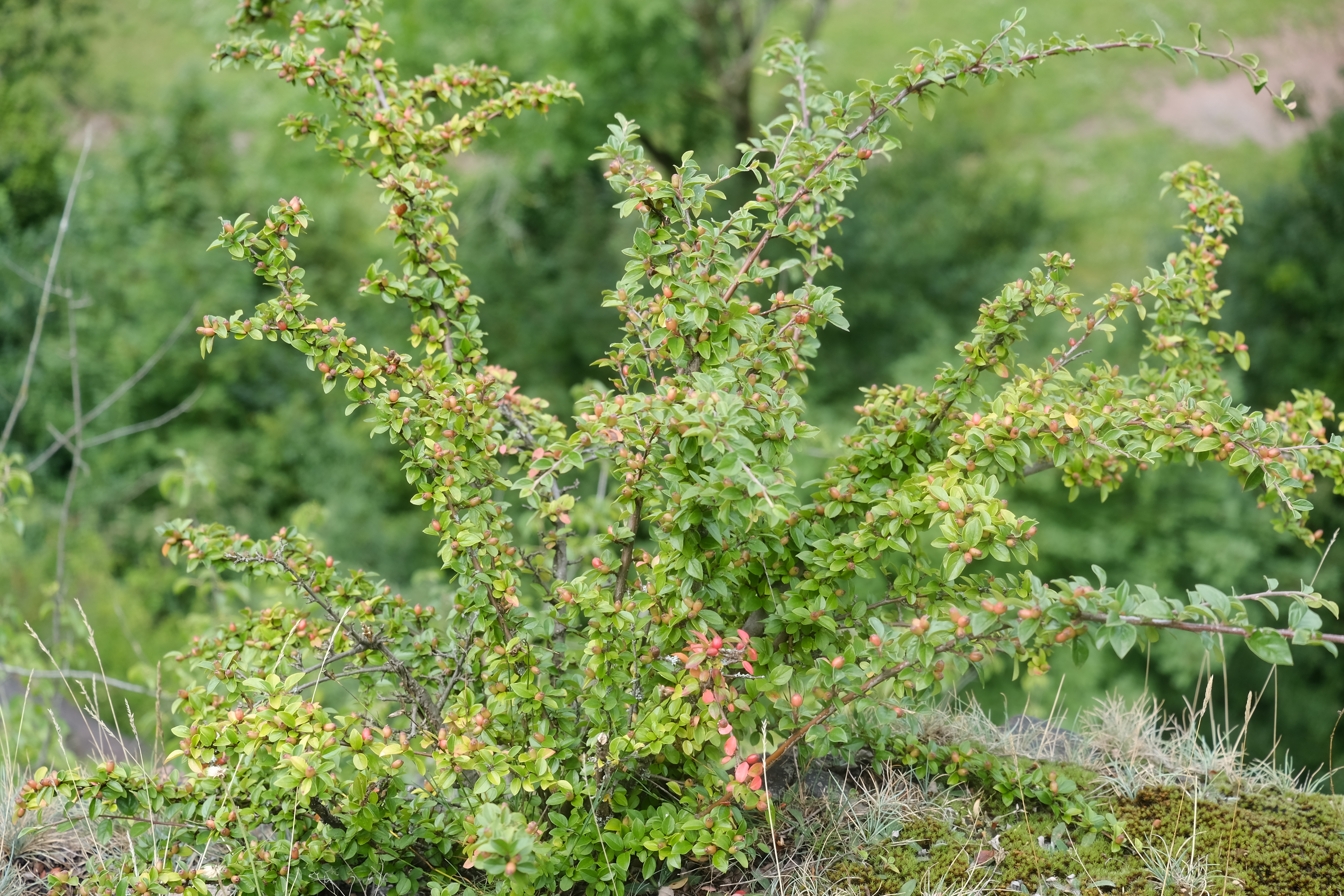
Habit

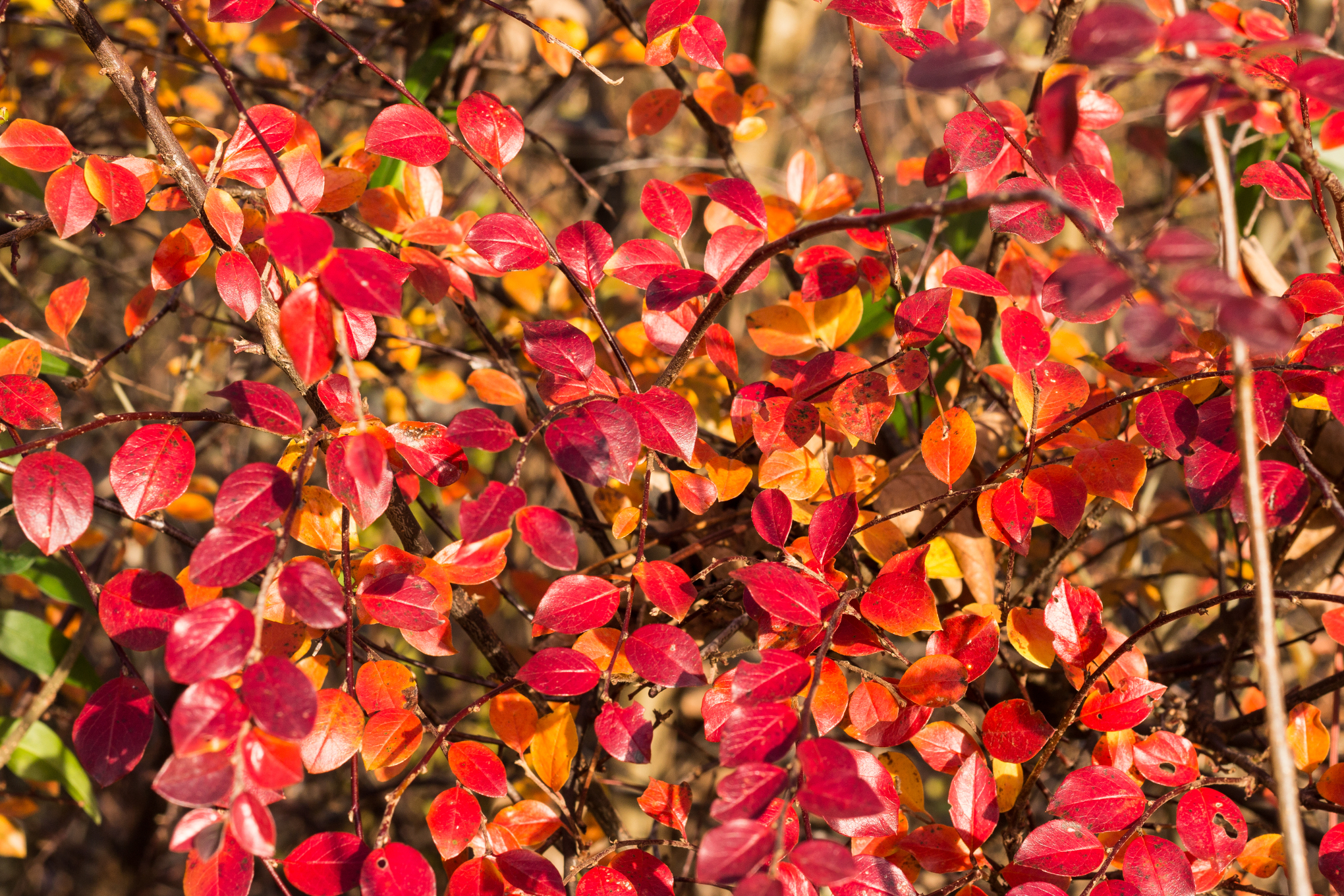
Autumn foliage
