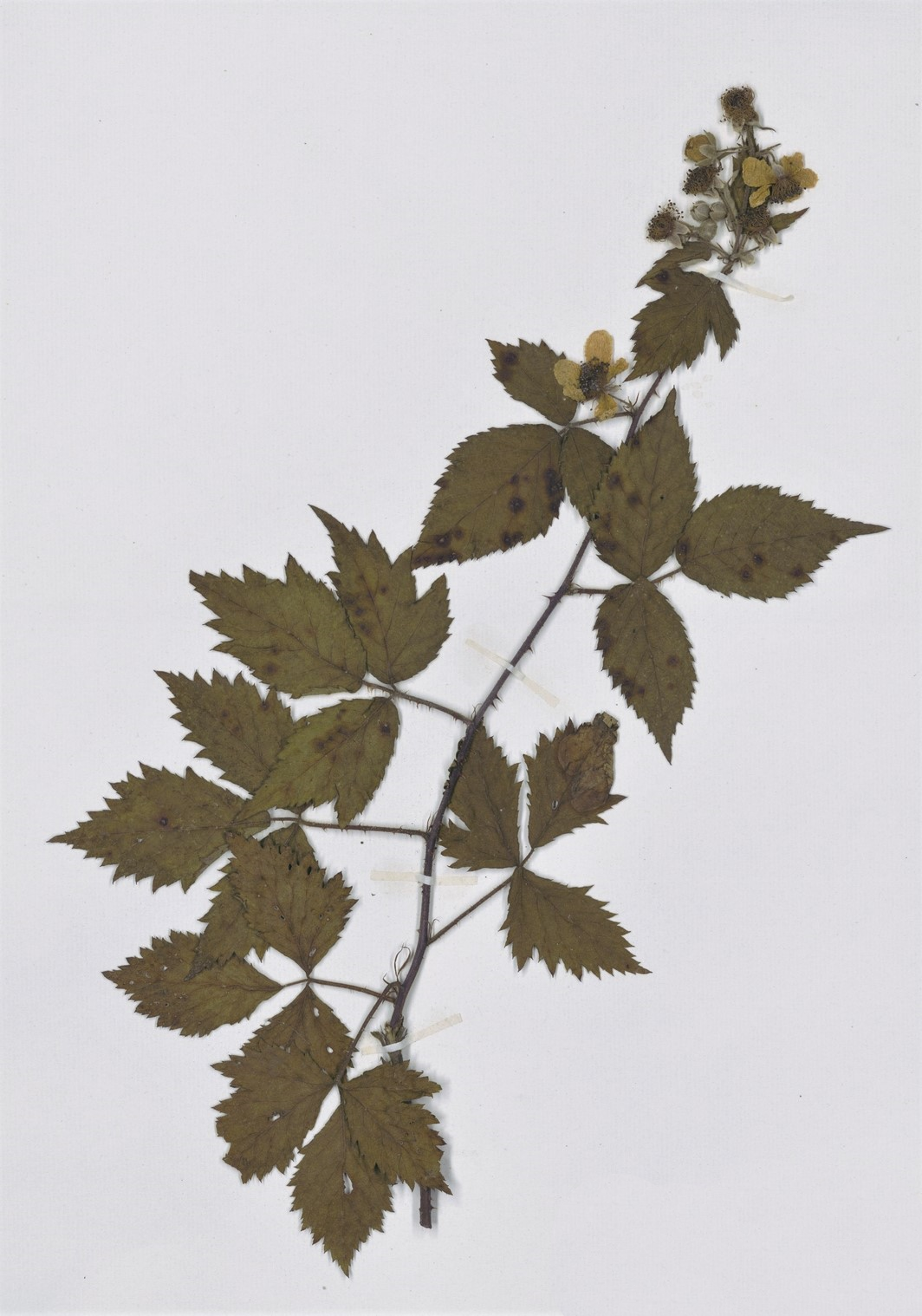

Scientific classification
- Kingdom: Plantae
- Clade: Tracheophytes
- Clade: Angiosperms
- Clade: Eudicots
- Clade: Rosids
- Order: Rosales
- Family: Rosaceae
- Genus: Rubus
- Species: R. pyramidalis

Binomial name
- Rubus pyramidalis Kaltenb.

= Rubus pyramidalis =

Species of flowering plant

Rubus pyramidalis is a species of bramble, a flowering plant in the rose family, native to northwest Europe.

== Description ==
R. pyramidalis is a low arching shrub, with a dark red, variously hairy, unfurrowed stem. The stem bears numerous prickles which are 5–8 mm (0.20–0.31 in) long, with a yellow tip. The leaves are divided into five light green, hairy leaflets, with all of these leaflets arising from the same point (palmately compound). The terminal leaflet has an acuminate apex. The flowers are pink, and the individual petals do not overlap.

== Distribution and habitat ==
It is found in Belgium, Czechoslovakia, Denmark, France, Germany, Great Britain, Ireland, Luxembourg, the Netherlands, Poland, and Sweden. It is introduced in New South Wales, Australia.

In the British Isles, R. pyramidalis is a plant of hedgerows, woodland margins and heathland. It has a broad distribution in most of England and Wales, except northeast England, while it is confined to the western half of Scotland. In Ireland, R. pyramidalis is scattered, but with a concentration of records in counties Galway and Mayo.
