= Rubus gratus =

Scientific classification
- Kingdom: Plantae
- Clade: Embryophytes
- Clade: Tracheophytes
- Clade: Spermatophytes
- Clade: Angiosperms
- Clade: Eudicots
- Clade: Rosids
- Order: Rosales
- Family: Rosaceae
- Genus: Rubus
- Species: R. gratus

Binomial name
- Rubus gratus Focke

Species of fruit and plant

Rubus gratus is a species of bramble found across much of Northwestern Europe.

== Description ==
Rubus gratus is an arching shrub, with a reddish-purple, sharply angled stem. The stem has numerous prickles of varying sizes, most being between 4 and 7 millimetres (1/8 and 1/4 inch) in length. The leaves are composed of five yellowish green leaflets. The pink flowers are up to 4 centimetres (1 5/8 in) in diameter).

== Uses ==
The fruits have been described as some of the choicest blackberries in the genus, particularly for cooked desserts.
