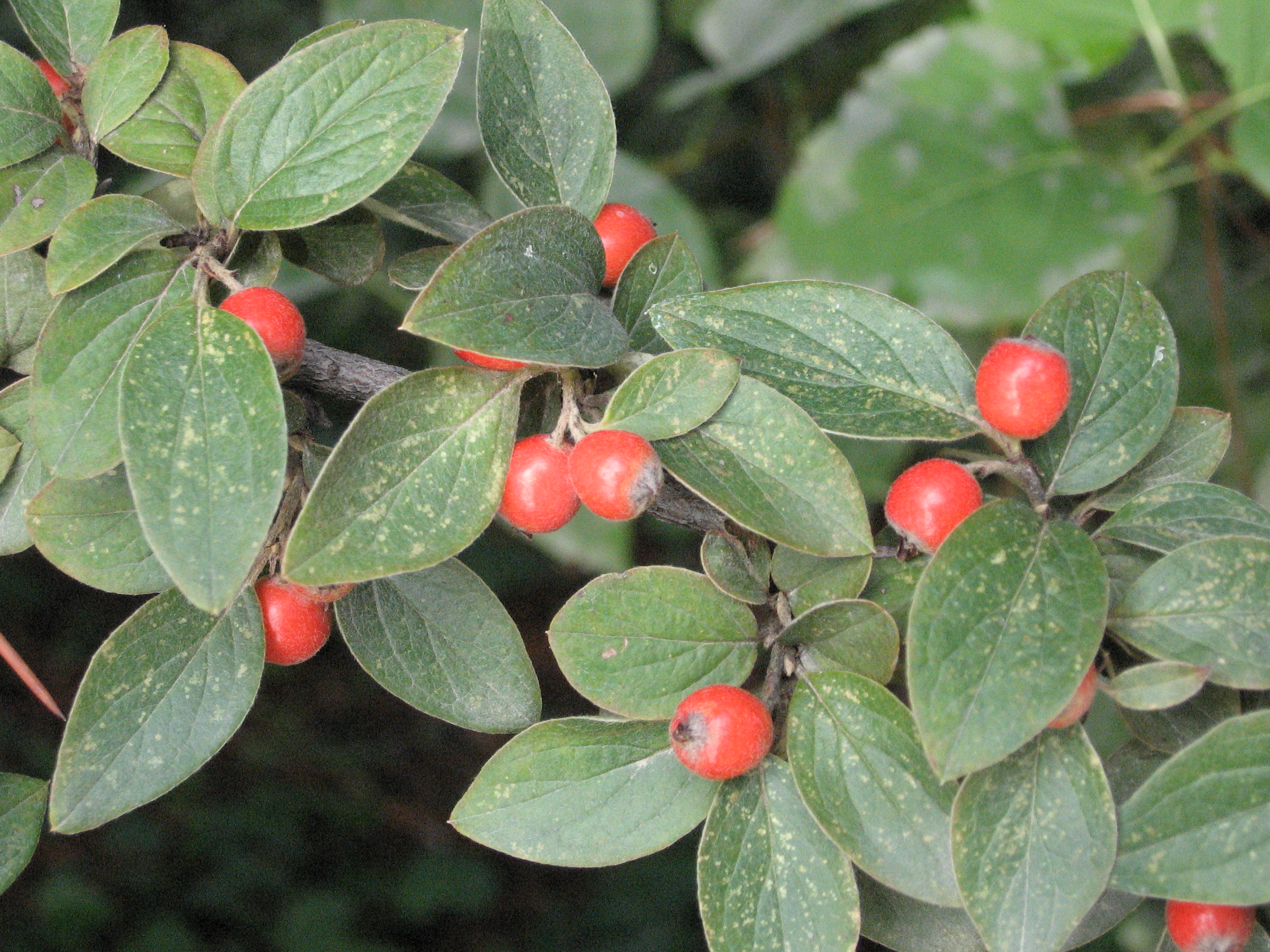

Scientific classification
- Kingdom: Plantae
- Clade: Tracheophytes
- Clade: Angiosperms
- Clade: Eudicots
- Clade: Rosids
- Order: Rosales
- Family: Rosaceae
- Genus: Cotoneaster
- Species: C. franchetii

Binomial name
- Cotoneaster franchetii Bois

Synonyms
- List: Cotoneaster cinerascens (Rehder) Flinck & B.Hylmö; Cotoneaster franchetii var. cinerascens Rehder; Cotoneaster franchetii var. sternianus Turrill; Cotoneaster mairei H.Lév.; Cotoneaster sternianus (Turrill) Boom; Cotoneaster tengyuehensis J.Fryer & B.Hylmö; Cotoneaster vilmorinianus G.Klotz; Cotoneaster wardii W.W.Sm.; Pyrus cinerascens (Rehder) M.F.Fay & Christenh.; Pyrus franchetii (Bois) M.F.Fay & Christenh.; Pyrus klotzii M.F.Fay & Christenh.; Pyrus sterniana (Turrill) M.F.Fay & Christenh.; Pyrus turdus M.F.Fay & Christenh.; Pyrus variabilis M.F.Fay & Christenh.; Pyrus wardii (W.W.Sm.) M.F.Fay & Christenh.

= Cotoneaster franchetii =

Species of plant

Cotoneaster franchetii (Franchet's cotoneaster or orange cotoneaster) is a species of Cotoneaster native to southwestern China, in the provinces of Guizhou, Sichuan, Tibet, and Yunnan, and also in adjacent northern Myanmar and northern Thailand.

It is an evergreen or semi-evergreen shrub growing to 3 metres (9.8 ft) tall. The leaves are oval-acute, 2–3.5 centimetres (0.79–1.38 in) long and 1–1.5 centimetres (0.39–0.59 in) broad, shiny green above, pubescent below with dense whitish to yellowish hairs. The flowers are produced in corymbs of 5–15 together, each flower 6–7 millimetres (0.24–0.28 in) diameter, with the five petals pink on the outer side, white on the inner side. The fruit is a red pome 6–9 millimetres (0.24–0.35 in) diameter; they are eaten by fruit-eating birds who disperse the seeds in their droppings.

Two varieties are accepted by some authors, but not treated as distinct by the Flora of China:

- Cotoneaster franchetii var. franchetii, described above
- Cotoneaster franchetii var. cinerascens Rehd, larger, to 4 metres (13 ft) tall, with leaves up to 4 centimetres (1.6 in) long, and up to 30 flowers per corymb

Some authors include a third variety, var. sternianus, although more often, this is treated as a distinct species, Cotoneaster sternianus. As Cotoneaster sternianus it has gained the Royal Horticultural Society's Award of Garden Merit.

== Cultivation and uses ==
Cotoneaster franchetii is a popular ornamental plant. It has escaped from cultivation and become locally naturalised in parts of the British Isles and the Pacific Northwest of North America, as well as Northern California.

Scientists at the Royal Horticultural Society (RHS) in the UK carried out a study on the effectiveness of hedges for soaking up air pollution, comparing different types of shrubs including cotoneaster, hawthorn, and western red cedar. They found that bushy, hairy-leafed varieties of cotoneaster, such as this, are “super plants” that can help soak up air pollution. On roads with heavy traffic, the dense, hairy-leaved Cotoneaster franchetii was at least 20% more effective at soaking up air pollution than other shrubs often planted along roadsides.
