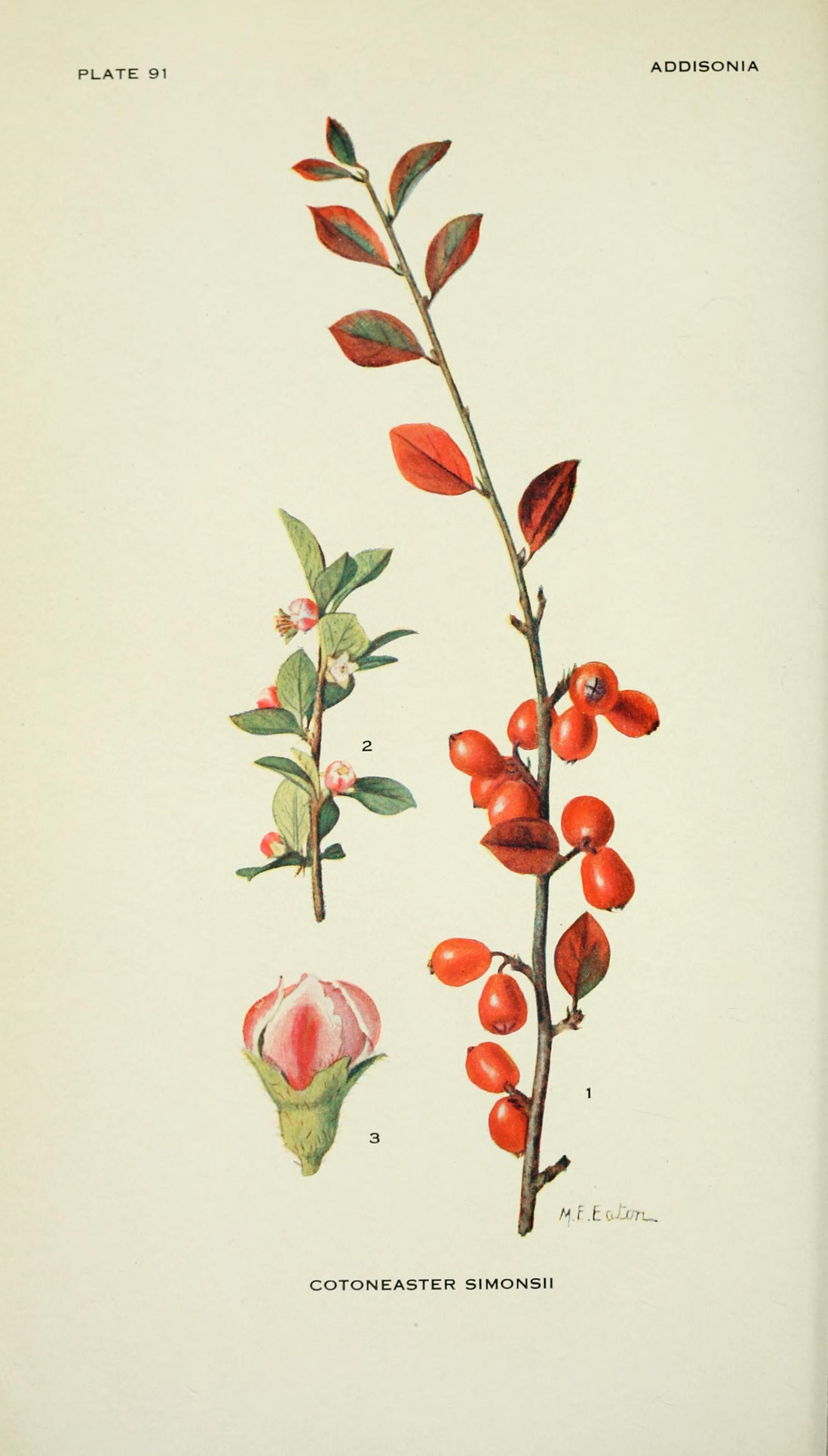
- Botanical illustration

Scientific classification
- Kingdom: Plantae
- Clade: Tracheophytes
- Clade: Angiosperms
- Clade: Eudicots
- Clade: Rosids
- Order: Rosales
- Family: Rosaceae
- Genus: Cotoneaster
- Species: C. simonsii

Binomial name
- Cotoneaster simonsii Baker

Synonyms
- List: Cotoneaster acuminatus var. simonsii Decne.; Cotoneaster acuminatus var. simonsii (Baker) Dippel; Cotoneaster acuminatus var. symonsii (Baker) Asch. & Graebn.; Cotoneaster assamensis G.Klotz; Cotoneaster khasiensis G.Klotz; Cotoneaster newryensis Eug.Barbier; Pyrus assamensis (G.Klotz) M.F.Fay & Christenh.; Pyrus newryensis (Eug.Barbier) M.F.Fay & Christenh.; Pyrus simonsii (Baker) M.F.Fay & Christenh.

= Cotoneaster simonsii =

Species of plant in the rose family

Cotoneaster simonsii (syn. Cotoneaster newryensis), the Himalayan cotoneaster, is a species of flowering plant in the family Rosaceae. It is native to Nepal, the eastern Himalayas, Assam, and Myanmar, and has been introduced to a number of locales in Europe, the west coast of North America, and Australia as a garden escapee. The Royal Horticultural Society considers it to be an undesirable invasive non-native species.

== Description ==
The species is 3–5 m (10–16 ft) tall. It apex is acute, while the base is either cuneate or obtuse. Its petioles are 5–7 mm (0.2–0.3 in) and are both strigose and villous. Its fertile shoots not to mention 3–5 leaves are 30–50 mm (1.2–2.0 in) in length with the stamens being of 18–20 mm (0.7–0.8 in) long. Both the fruits and the flowers are 7–8 mm (0.28–0.31 in) in length. The fruits are globose, obovoid, red and shiny, with green coloured calyx lobes which are flat. The flowers bloom in June, while fruits ripen from September to October.

== Cultivation history ==
As its synonym C. newryensis, it was first raised at Thomas Smith's Daisy Hill Nursery in Ireland from where it was moved to be distributed by Barbier Nursery in France. It appeared at Lemoine nursery catalogue by 1911 in Nancy, France.

The plant has its detractors, such as garden designer Russell Page: "It is a horrid ungainly plant which I would usually exclude from any garden."
