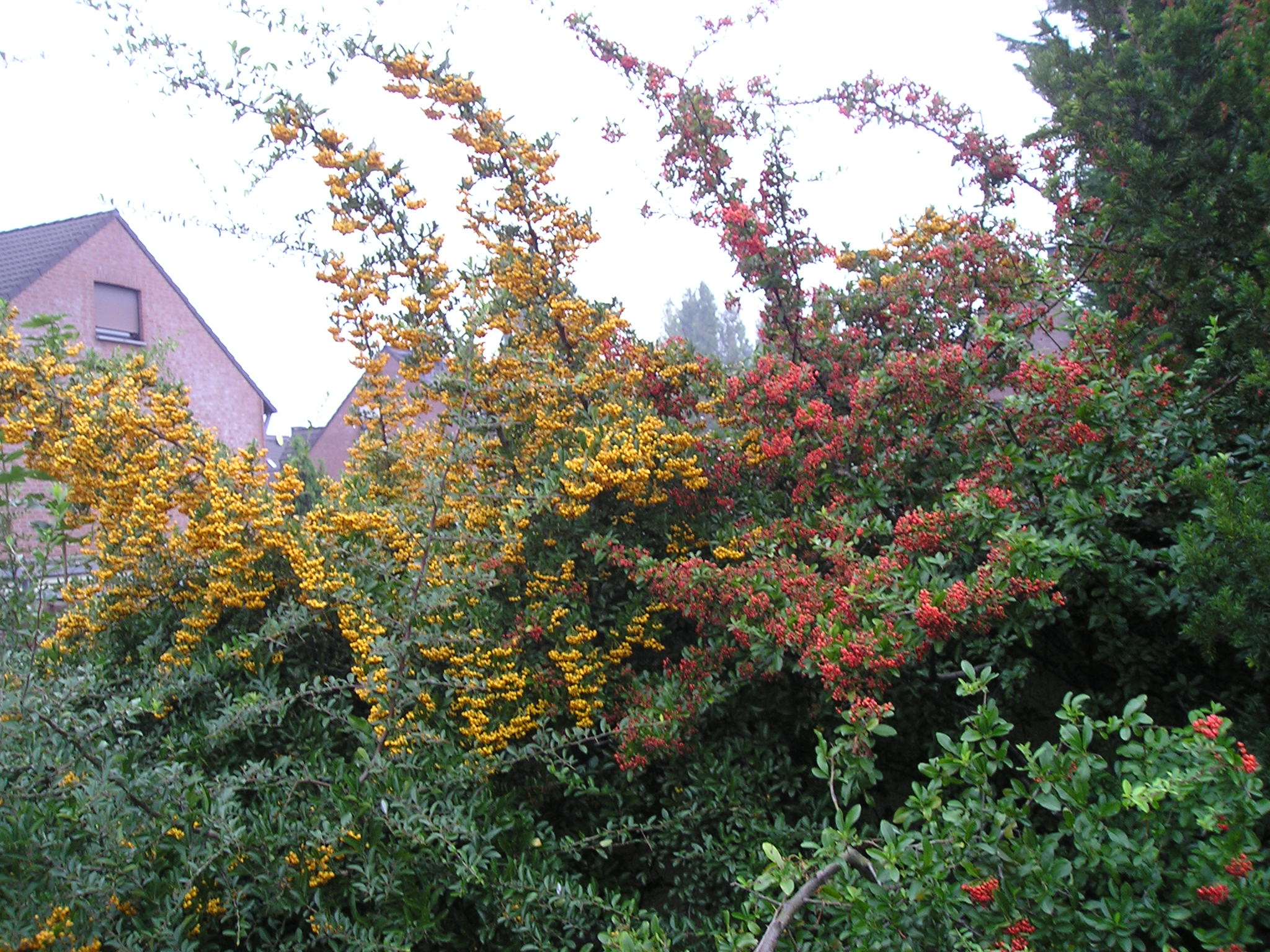

Scientific classification
- Kingdom: Plantae
- Clade: Tracheophytes
- Clade: Angiosperms
- Clade: Eudicots
- Clade: Rosids
- Order: Rosales
- Family: Rosaceae
- Genus: Pyracantha
- Species: P. coccinea

Binomial name
- Pyracantha coccinea M.Roem.

Synonyms
- Synonymy: Cotoneaster pyracantha (L.) Spach; Cotoneaster pyracantha lalandei L.Möller; Crataegus dumosa Salisb.; Crataegus lalandei May; Crataegus lalandei microcarpa May; Crataegus pauciflora André; Crataegus pauciflora (Poir.) Pers.; Crataegus pyracantha (L.) Medik.; Crataegus pyracantha lalandei Duren; Crataegus pyracantha var. pauciflora (Poir.) Steud.; Gymnopyrenium pyracantha (L.) Dulac; Mespilus lalandei Dippel; Mespilus pauciflora Poir., nom. rej.; Mespilus pyracantha L.; Mespilus pyracantha var. pauciflora (Poir.) Dum.Cours.; Oxyacantha amygdalifolia Bubani; Pyracantha coccinea var. fructu-albo Rehder, not validly publ.; Pyracantha coccinea var. implexa Lavallée, nom. nud.; Pyracantha coccinea var. lalandei Dippel; Pyracantha coccinea f. latifolia Zabel; Pyracantha coccinea var. pauciflora (Poir.) Dippel; Pyracantha lucida de Vos; Pyracantha pauciflora (Poir.) M.Roem.; Pyracantha pyracantha (L.) Voss, not validly publ.; Pyracantha pyracantha f. lalandei Voss; Pyracantha spinosa de Vos; Pyracantha spinosa lalandei de Vos; Pyracantha vulgaris Lothelier, nom. nud.; Timbalia pyracantha (L.) Clos

= Pyracantha coccinea =

Species of flowering plant

Pyracantha coccinea, the scarlet firethorn or red firethorn is the European species of firethorn that has been cultivated in gardens since the late 16th century.

== Description ==
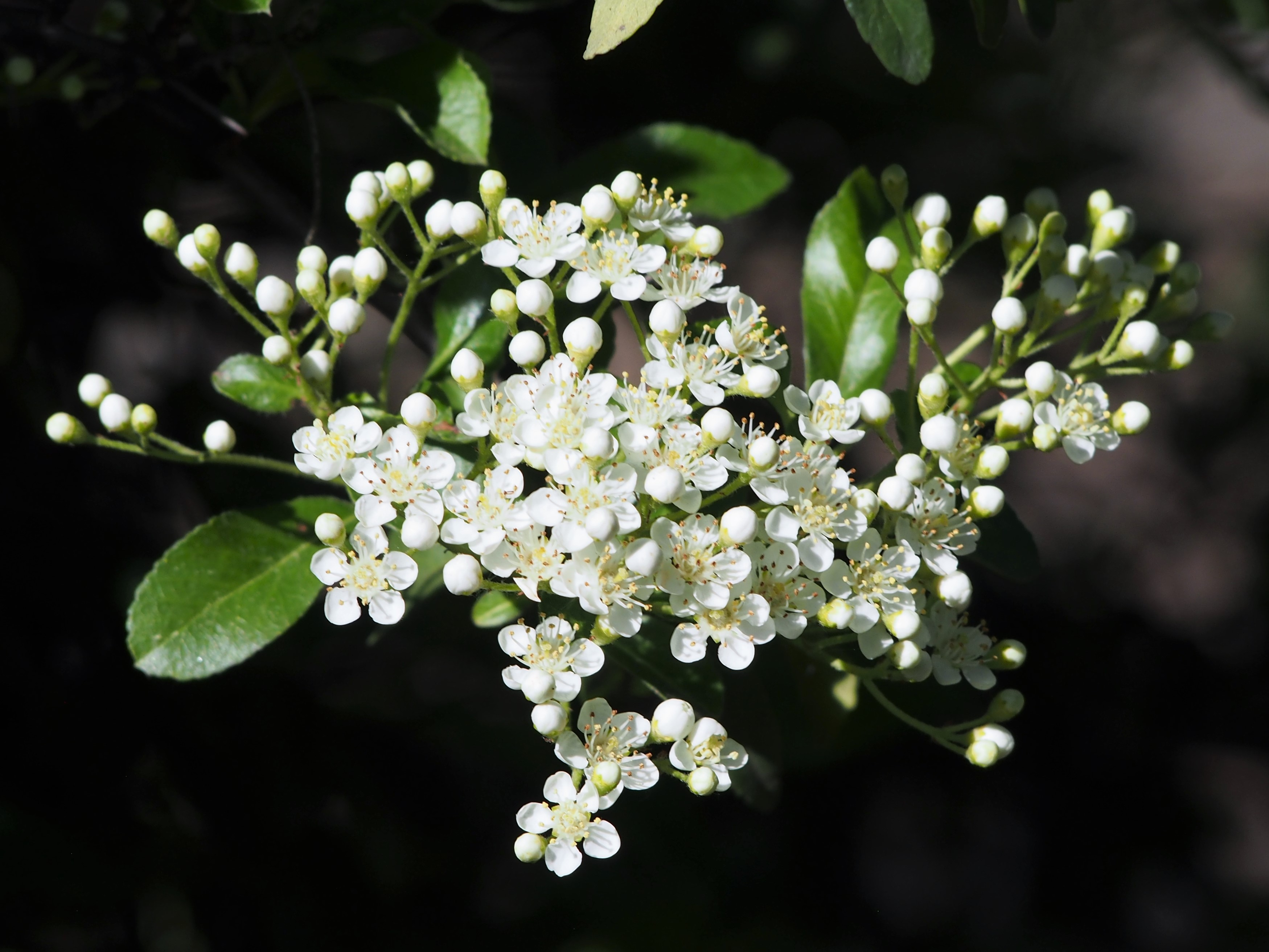
Pyracantha coccinea flowering in the University of Wrocław Botanical Garden

=== Vegetative characteristics ===
Pyracantha coccinea is an evergreen or deciduous, up to 2 m tall shrub with stems bearing sharp thorns.

=== Generative characteristics ===
The many-flowered inflorescence bears white, bisexual, 7-8 mm wide flowers. The fruit is red, 5 mm wide, globose to egg-shaped.

=== Cytology ===
The chromosome count is 2n = 34.

== Taxonomy ==
It was described by Max Joseph Roemer in 1847.

=== Etymology ===
The genus name Pyracantha, from the Greek pyr meaning fire and akantha meaning thorn, refers to the thorny branches and the bright red fruit. The specific epithet coccinea, from the Latin coccineus, means deep red.

== Distribution and habitat ==
It is native to Albania, Bulgaria, France, Greece, Iran, Italy, Crimean Peninsula, Lebanon, Syria, North Caucasus, Balkan Peninsula, Spain, Switzerland, Transcaucasus, Germany and Turkey.

== Uses ==
In England, since the late 18th century, it has been used to cover unsightly walls. The fruit is eaten by birds, and can be made into jelly.

== Cultivars ==
- Pyracantha coccinea 'Kasan'.
- Pyracantha coccinea 'Lalandei'. About 1874, M. Lalande, a nurseryman in Angers, France, selected from seedlings of P. coccinea an improved form, more freely berrying than the type. A sport has produced a yellow-berried form. These, and further selections, have largely ousted the ordinary form from nursery stock.
- Pyracantha coccinea 'Sparkler'.
