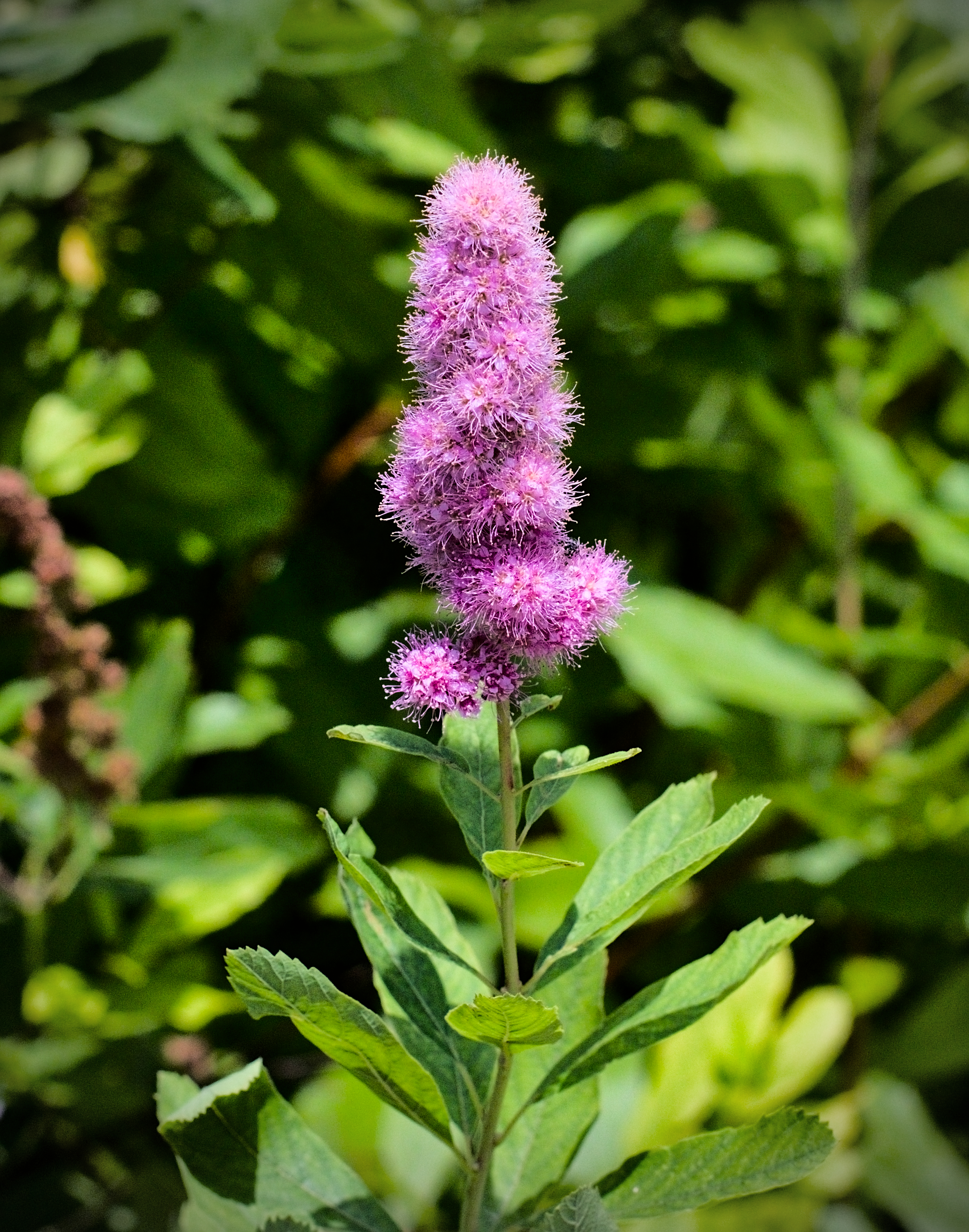
- At the Meise Botanic Garden
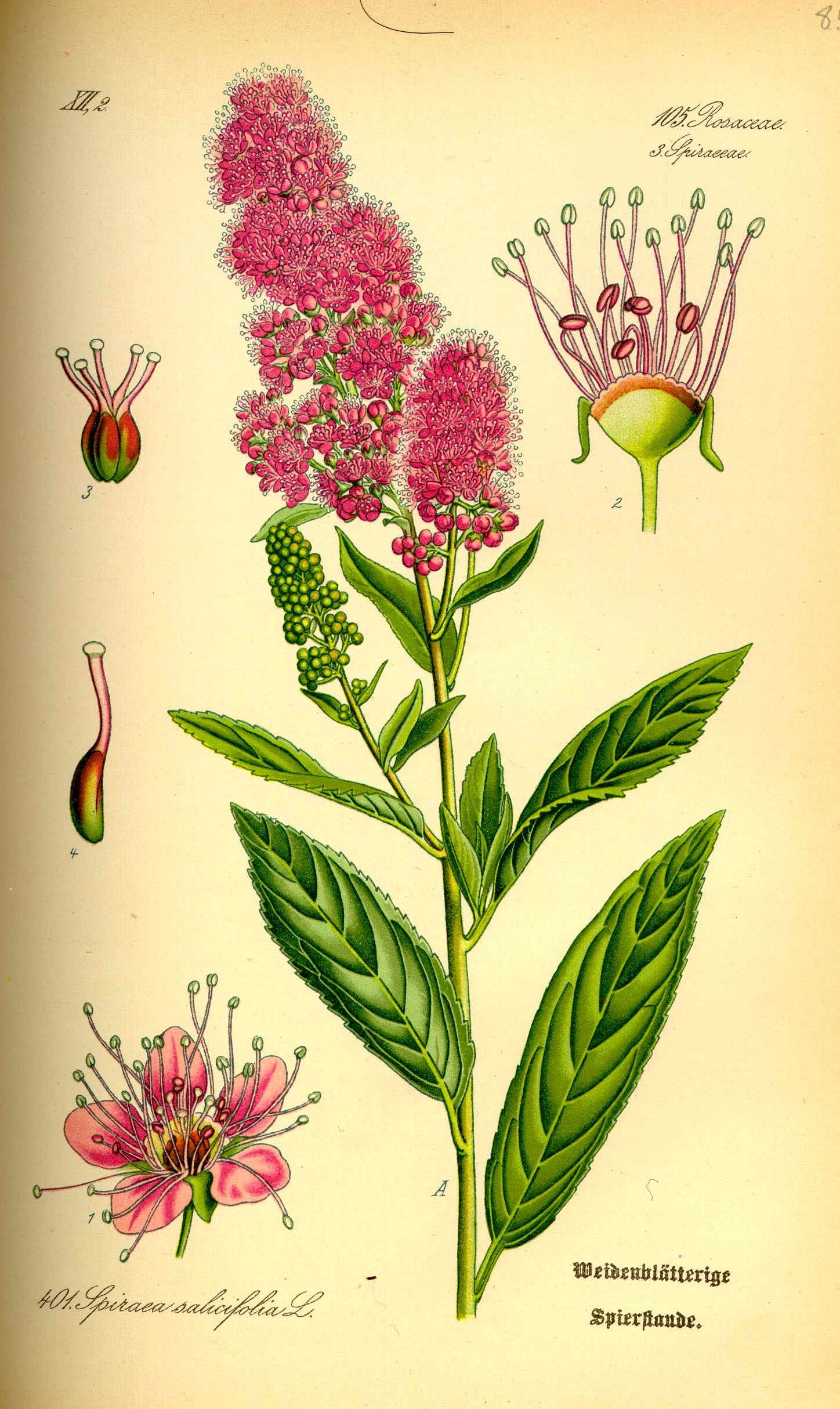
- Botanical illustration

Scientific classification
- Kingdom: Plantae
- Clade: Tracheophytes
- Clade: Angiosperms
- Clade: Eudicots
- Clade: Rosids
- Order: Rosales
- Family: Rosaceae
- Genus: Spiraea
- Species: S. salicifolia

Binomial name
- Spiraea salicifolia L.

Synonyms
- List: Spiraea alba f. lanceolata (Torr. & A.Gray) C.K.Schneid.; Spiraea amena Raf.; Spiraea amena var. pauciflora Raf.; Spiraea arguta Hoffmanns.; Spiraea bethlehemensis K.Koch; Spiraea bethlehemensis alba Zabel; Spiraea bethlemensis Wenz.; Spiraea carnea (Aiton) Steud.; Spiraea carpinifolia Willd.; Spiraea carpinifolia incarnata Zabel; Spiraea eximia Regel; Spiraea grandiflora G.Lodd.; Spiraea heterophylla Raf.; Spiraea humilis Pojark.; Spiraea incarnata K.Koch; Spiraea salicifolia var. alpestris Maxim.; Spiraea salicifolia var. alpestris Pall.; Spiraea salicifolia var. bethlehemensis Lavallée; Spiraea salicifolia subf. bethlehemensis Zabel; Spiraea salicifolia var. brevifolia Trautv. & C.A.Mey.; Spiraea salicifolia var. carnea Aiton; Spiraea salicifolia var. carnea (Anon.) Lavallée; Spiraea salicifolia var. floribunda Lavallée; Spiraea salicifolia var. genuina Trautv. & C.A.Mey.; Spiraea salicifolia var. grandiflora Loudon; Spiraea salicifolia var. grandiflora K.Koch; Spiraea salicifolia f. grandiflora (Loudon) C.K.Schneid.; Spiraea salicifolia var. humilis (Pojark.) H.Hara; Spiraea salicifolia var. incarnata Lavallée; Spiraea salicifolia var. lanceolata Maxim.; Spiraea salicifolia var. lanceolata Torr. & A.Gray; Spiraea salicifolia var. major Pall.; Spiraea salicifolia var. minor Pall.; Spiraea salicifolia var. nana K.Koch; Spiraea salicifolia var. oligodonta T.T.Yu; Spiraea salicifolia var. pensylvanica Lavallée; Spiraea salicifolia var. polystachys Lavallée; Spiraea salicifolia var. regeliana Lavallée; Spiraea salicifolia var. rosea Lavallée; Spiraea salicifolia var. roseola Lavallée; Spiraea salicifolia var. rubra Lavallée; Spiraea salicifolia var. semperflorens Regel; Spiraea salicifolia var. typica Buia; Spiraea salicifolia var. undulata Lavallée; Spiraea sibirica Raf.; Spiraea tenuifolia Otto ex Dippel; Spiraea virgata Raf.

= Spiraea salicifolia =

Species of plant

Spiraea salicifolia, the bridewort, willow-leaved meadowsweet, spice hardhack, or Aaron's beard, is a species of flowering plant in the family Rosaceae. A shrub, it is native to east-central Europe, Kazakhstan, all of Siberia, the Russian Far East, Mongolia, northern China, Korea, and Japan, and it has been widely introduced to the rest of Europe and to eastern North America. It has been cultivated since the 1500s for hedges and similar applications, but is not particularly well-behaved.

== Subtaxa ==
The following varieties are accepted:

- Spiraea salicifolia var. grosseserrata Liou & Liou f. – Manchuria
- Spiraea salicifolia var. salicifolia – Entire range
