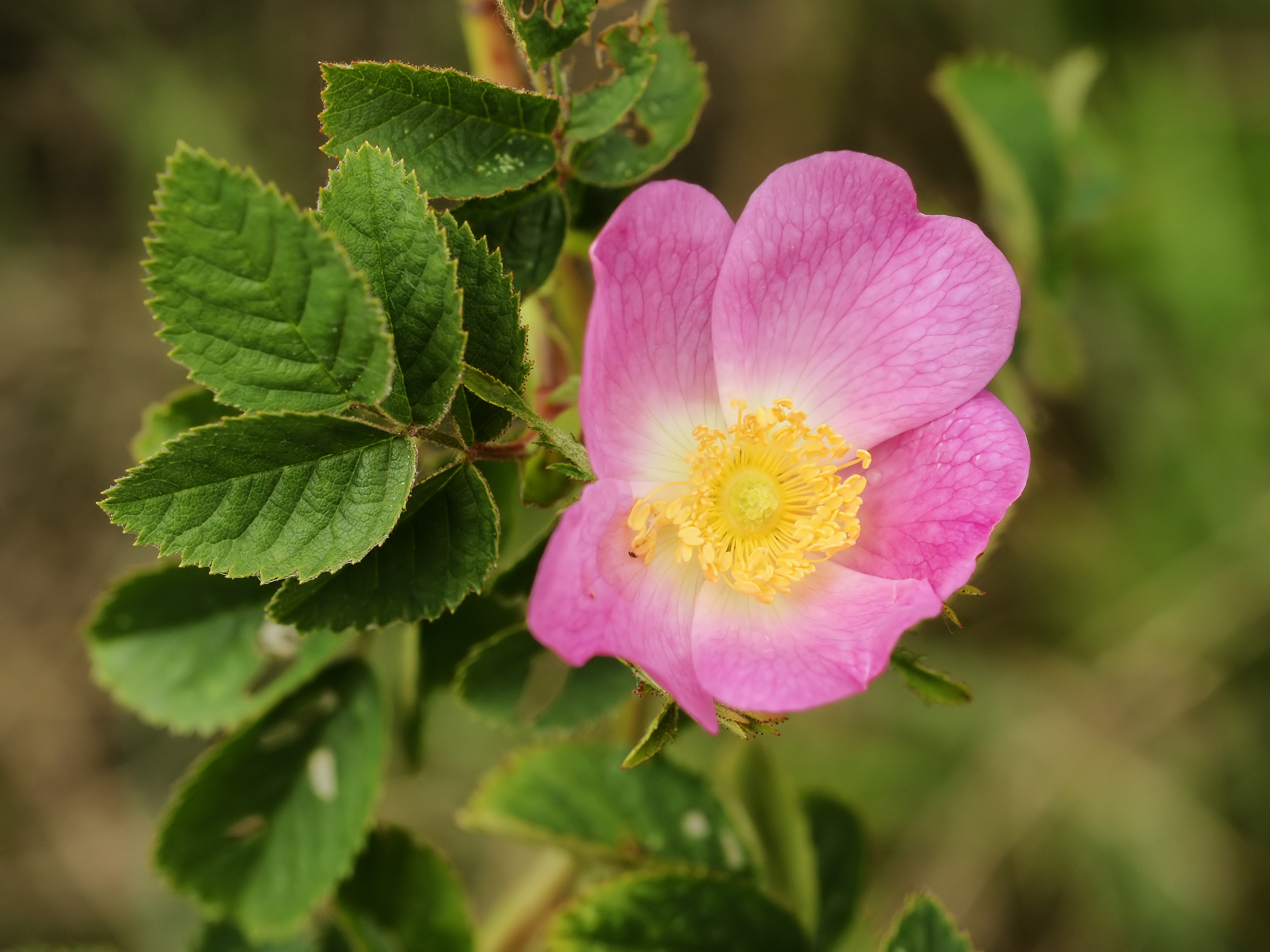

Scientific classification
- Kingdom: Plantae
- Clade: Tracheophytes
- Clade: Angiosperms
- Clade: Eudicots
- Clade: Rosids
- Order: Rosales
- Family: Rosaceae
- Genus: Rosa
- Species: R. tomentosa

Binomial name
- Rosa tomentosa Sm.

= Rosa tomentosa =

Species of rose

Rosa tomentosa, otherwise known as the harsh downy-rose, is a species of wild rose. It is a shrub growing to about 3 metres (10 ft). It is found in Asia Minor, the Caucasus (where it may not be native), and much of Europe: the British Isles, France, Central Europe, northern Spain, Italy, and the Balkans (except Greece). On the British Isles it can be found in hedgerows and woodland margins, and it typically flowers between June and July. Further south, in Bulgaria, it flowers in May.
