= Cotoneaster ambiguus =

Scientific classification
- Kingdom: Plantae
- Clade: Tracheophytes
- Clade: Angiosperms
- Clade: Eudicots
- Clade: Rosids
- Order: Rosales
- Family: Rosaceae
- Genus: Cotoneaster
- Species: C. ambiguus

Binomial name
- Cotoneaster ambiguus Rehder & E.H.Wilson

Synonyms
- List: Cotoneaster acutifolius var. ambiguus (Rehder & E.H.Wilson) Hurus.; Cotoneaster acutifolius var. laetevirens Rehder & E.H.Wilson; Cotoneaster hsingshangensis J.Fryer & B.Hylmö; Cotoneaster laetevirens (Rehder & E.H.Wilson) G.Klotz; Cotoneaster pseudoambiguus J.Fryer & B.Hylmö; Cotoneaster tebbutus J.Fryer & B.Hylmö; Pyrus hsingshangensis (J.Fryer & B.Hylmö) M.F.Fay & Christenh.; Pyrus laetevirens (Rehder & E.H.Wilson) M.F.Fay & Christenh.; Pyrus pseudoambigua (J.Fryer & B.Hylmö) M.F.Fay & Christenh.; Pyrus sennikoviana M.F.Fay & Christenh.

Species of plant

Cotoneaster ambiguus, the dubious cotoneaster, is a flowering plant species in the Rosaceae family, native to central China and Inner Mongolia, and introduced to Belgium and Norway. A shrub of dense forests, it is morphologically intermediate between Cotoneaster moupinensis and C. acutifolius. It is available occasionally from commercial suppliers.
