= Cotoneaster suavis =

Scientific classification
- Kingdom: Plantae
- Clade: Tracheophytes
- Clade: Angiosperms
- Clade: Eudicots
- Clade: Rosids
- Order: Rosales
- Family: Rosaceae
- Genus: Cotoneaster
- Species: C. suavis

Binomial name
- Cotoneaster suavis Pojark.

Synonyms
- Cotoneaster racemiflorus subsp. suavis (Pojark.) Fed.; Pyrus suavis (Pojark.) M.F.Fay & Christenh.

Species of plant in the rose family

Cotoneaster suavis is a species of flowering plant in the family Rosaceae, native to the northern Caucasus, Central Asia (except Uzbekistan), and Afghanistan. A rabbit-tolerant shrub reaching 9 ft (3 m), and hardy in USDA zones 6 through 9, it is rare in commerce.
