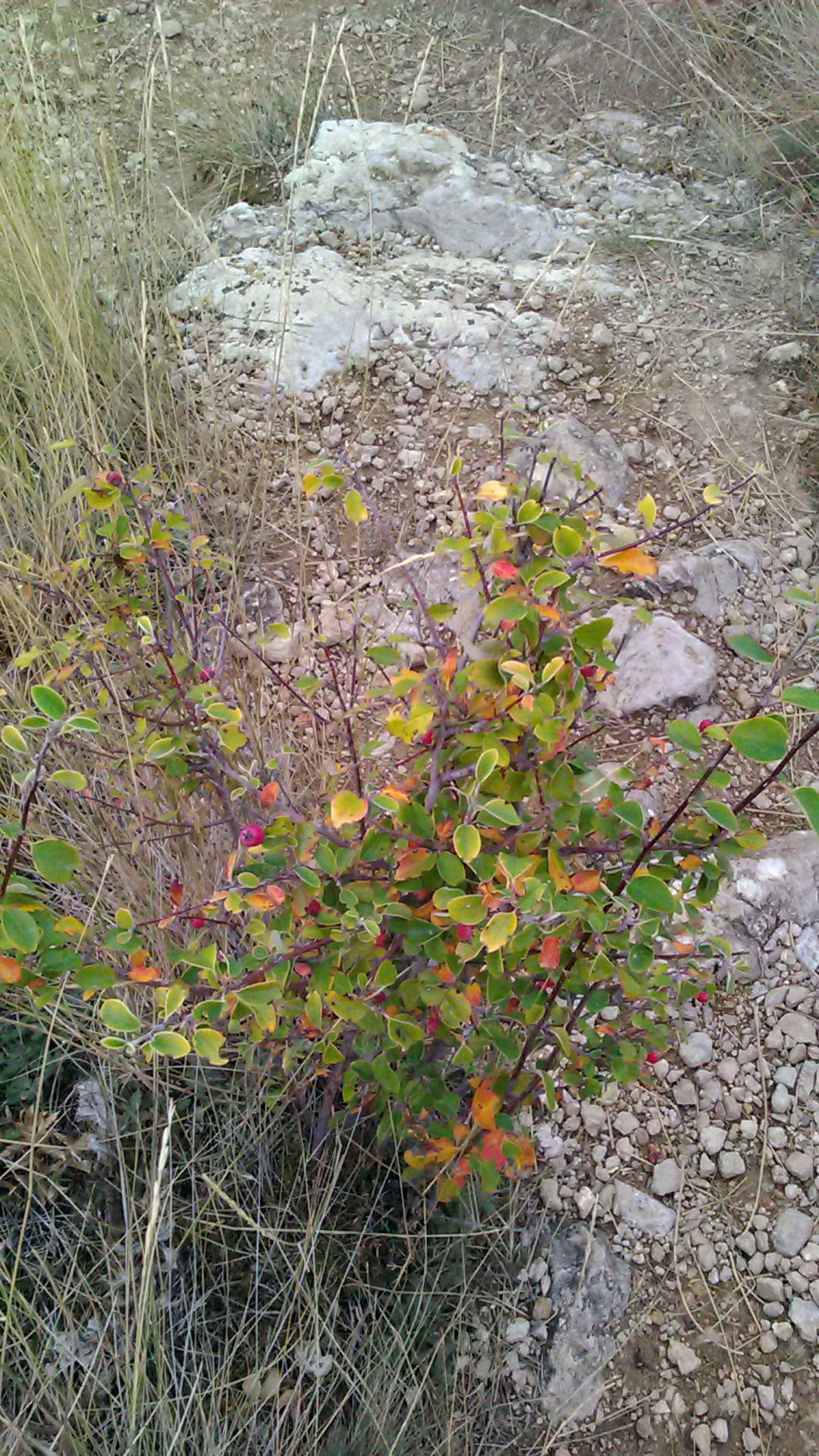
- Habit

Scientific classification
- Kingdom: Plantae
- Clade: Tracheophytes
- Clade: Angiosperms
- Clade: Eudicots
- Clade: Rosids
- Order: Rosales
- Family: Rosaceae
- Genus: Cotoneaster
- Species: C. tauricus

Binomial name
- Cotoneaster tauricus Pojark.

Synonyms
- Pyrus krymica M.F.Fay & Christenh.

= Cotoneaster tauricus =

Species of plant

Cotoneaster tauricus is a species of flowering plant in the family Rosaceae, native to Ukraine and Crimea. A shrub, it is often found in association with relict populations of Pistacia atlantica trees.
