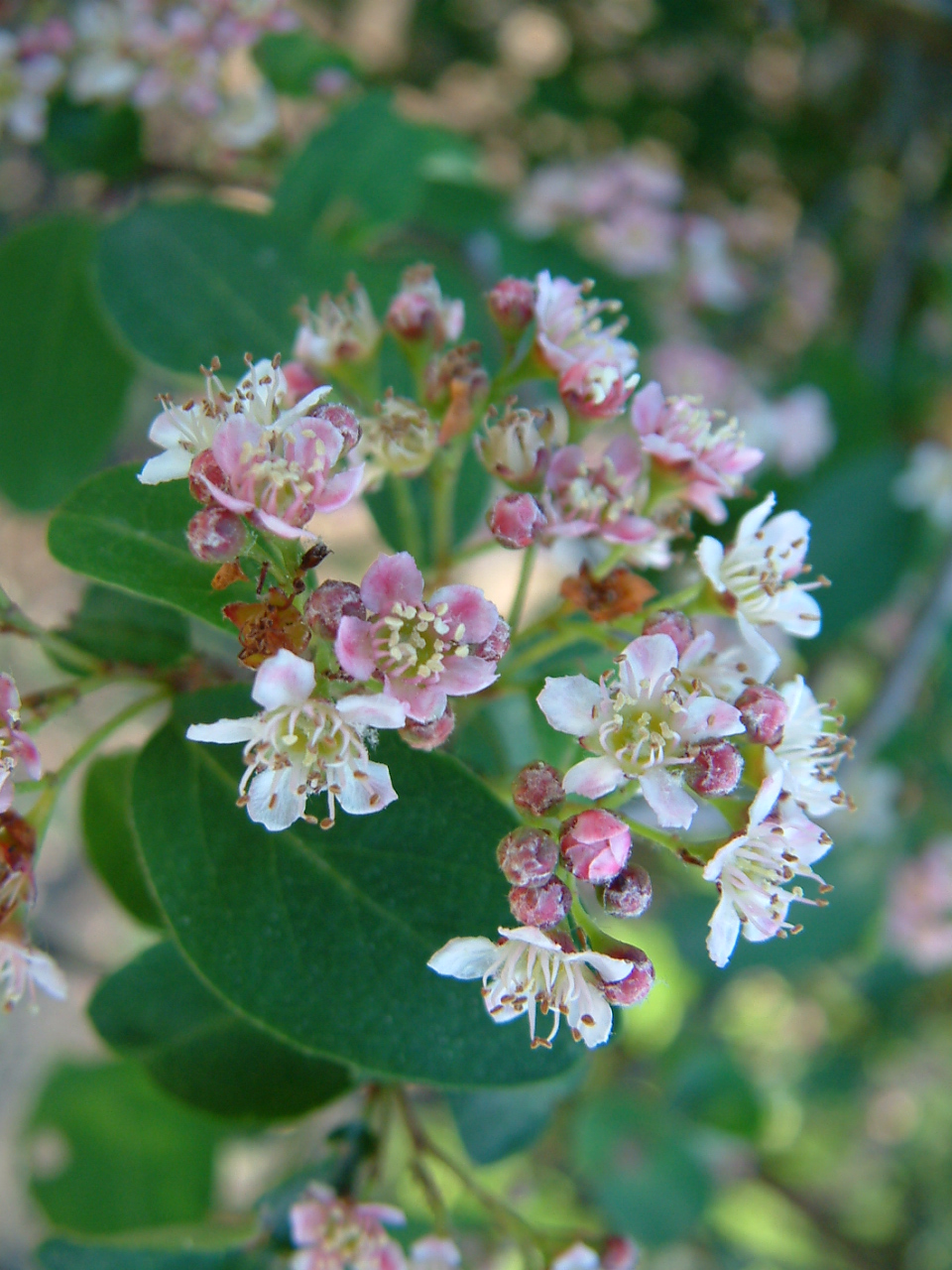
- Pink and white flowers

Scientific classification
- Kingdom: Plantae
- Clade: Tracheophytes
- Clade: Angiosperms
- Clade: Eudicots
- Clade: Rosids
- Order: Rosales
- Family: Rosaceae
- Genus: Cotoneaster
- Species: C. roseus

Binomial name
- Cotoneaster roseus Edgew.

= Cotoneaster roseus =

Species of flowering plant

Cotoneaster roseus is native to portions of the Himalayas, Iran, northern and western Pakistan, northwest India and Kashmir. The Latin name roseus means rosy or pink, and refers to its flower petals. It was first described by the Irish botanist Michael Pakenham Edgeworth as Cotoneaster rosea in 1846.
