= Cotoneaster tenuipes =

Scientific classification
- Kingdom: Plantae
- Clade: Tracheophytes
- Clade: Angiosperms
- Clade: Eudicots
- Clade: Rosids
- Order: Rosales
- Family: Rosaceae
- Genus: Cotoneaster
- Species: C. tenuipes

Binomial name
- Cotoneaster tenuipes Rehder & E.H.Wilson

Species of flowering plant

Cotoneaster tenuipes (slender cotoneaster; xi zhi xun zi in Chinese) is an "extremely graceful," meter-high, hirsute, deciduous cotoneaster shrub endemic to the temperate regions of China. It was named and described by botanists Alfred Rehder and E.H.Wilson in 1912.

== Description ==
=== Branches ===
The terminal and secondary twigs of C. tenuipes are slender, cylindrical and tapering; initially grayish-yellow, later changing to brownish-red. They have shaggy hairs that lie flatly to the stem surface when new, which are lost by degrees over time.

=== Leaves ===
The leaves of C. tenuipes are typically 2-2.5 cm (occasionally up to 3.5 cm) long, and 1.5–2 cm wide, and range in shape from ovate or elliptic-ovate to narrowly elliptic-ovate. The undersides are grayish with raised veins, and covered with short, woolly hairs which lie flatly to the surface; the uppersides are green, with slightly impressed veins, and sparsely covered with long, thin, soft, weak, hairs when young, but nearly hairless with age.

Both the leaf-stems (3–5 mm long) and their stipules (2.5–5 mm long, lanceolate) are hairy, but the stipules are much less so.

=== Flowers ===
Cotoneaster tenuipes goes into bloom from May to June.

Its flowers are about 7 mm in diameter, and borne on corymbs of two to four flowers each. The slender pedicels (1–3 mm), rachis and hypanthium are villous and closely appressed, but hypanthium only abaxially. The bracts (2–4 mm long) are puberulous, linear or linear-lanceolate. The sepals (~1.2 mm long) are triangularly ovate, and the petals (~3–4 mm long and almost as broad) are white and stiff, ovate or suborbicular, and are clawed at their base, giving it its epithet tenuipes which equates roughly with "slender foot" or "slender claw". Each flower has 15 stamens, which are shorter than its petals, and 2 styles that are shorter than or equal to the stamens. The ovary is covered at the apex with very short, fine, erect hairs.

=== Fruit ===
Cotoneaster tenuipes bears its fruit from September to October. They are purplish black, ovoid pomes (~ 8.5 X 5.5 mm), each contains one or two pyrenas.

== Genetics ==
The diploid chromosomal number for C. tenuipes is 68 (2n = 68).

== Range and habitat ==
Cotoneaster tenuipes is found naturally in China, in the provinces of Gansu, Qinghai, Shaanxi, Sichuan, Tibet and Yunnan, in forested and dryer, rocky, montane slopes, at elevations between 1900 and 3100 meters high.
