= Cotoneaster kaschkarovii =

Scientific classification
- Kingdom: Plantae
- Clade: Tracheophytes
- Clade: Angiosperms
- Clade: Eudicots
- Clade: Rosids
- Order: Rosales
- Family: Rosaceae
- Genus: Cotoneaster
- Species: C. kaschkarovii

Binomial name
- Cotoneaster kaschkarovii Pojark

Species of flowering plant

Cotoneaster kaschkarovii is a species of flowering plant in the family Rosaceae that can be found in Kangding and Sichuan provinces of China, and in Tibet.

== Description ==
The species is 2–4 metres (6 ft 7 in – 13 ft 1 in) tall while its petioles are 3–7 millimetres (0.12–0.28 in) in length and are pilose. It pedicels are 2–3 millimetres (0.079–0.118 in) in length. Its fertile shoots are 10–25 millimetres (0.39–0.98 in) including 2-3 leaves which are erect and lax at the same time. Corolla is 8–10 millimetres (0.31–0.39 in) long while its stamen is 16–20 millimetres (0.63–0.79 in) in length. The fruit is subglobose and is red in colour. Flowers bloom in May, while fruits ripe from August to September.
