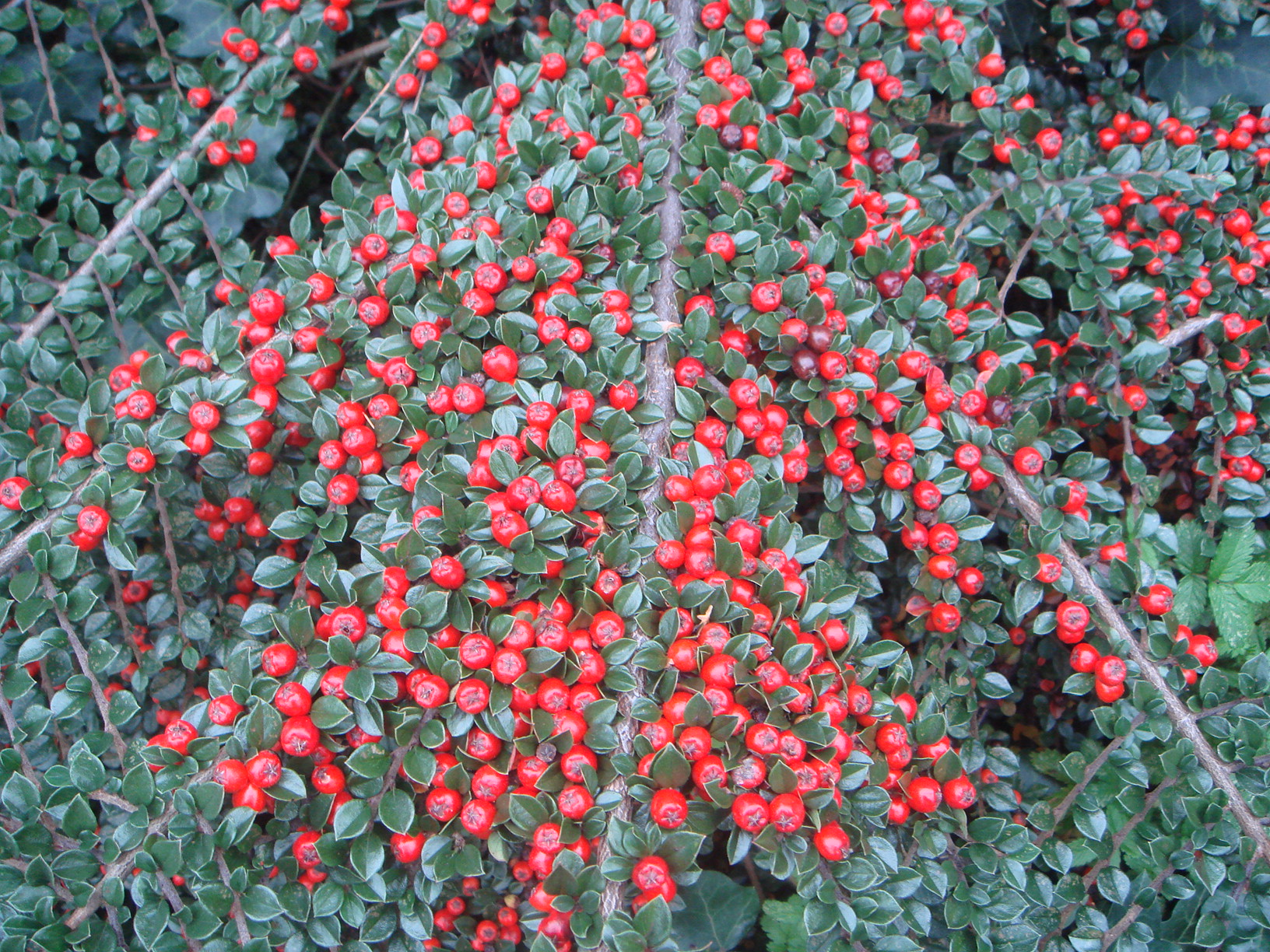
- Cotoneaster atropurpureus, Royal Botanic Garden Edinburgh

Scientific classification
- Kingdom: Plantae
- Clade: Tracheophytes
- Clade: Angiosperms
- Clade: Eudicots
- Clade: Rosids
- Order: Rosales
- Family: Rosaceae
- Genus: Cotoneaster
- Species: C. atropurpureus

Binomial name
- Cotoneaster atropurpureus Flinck & B.Hylmö

= Cotoneaster atropurpureus =

Species of flowering plant

Cotoneaster atropurpureus, the purple-flowered cotoneaster, is a species of flowering plant in the genus Cotoneaster of the family Rosaceae, native to the Hubei province of China. It is a prostrate, deciduous shrub growing to 2.5 metres (8 ft 2 in) wide. It can be used as groundcover or trained to ascend up a wall or other support. Its fan-shaped, arching branches bear small, rounded, glossy green leaves turning purple in autumn. Red/black flowers are followed by small, globose, scarlet fruits (pomes).

The cultivar 'Variegatus' (syn. C. horizontalis 'Variegatus'), with leaves margined in cream, turning red in autumn, is often seen in cultivation. It has gained the Royal Horticultural Society's Award of Garden Merit.
