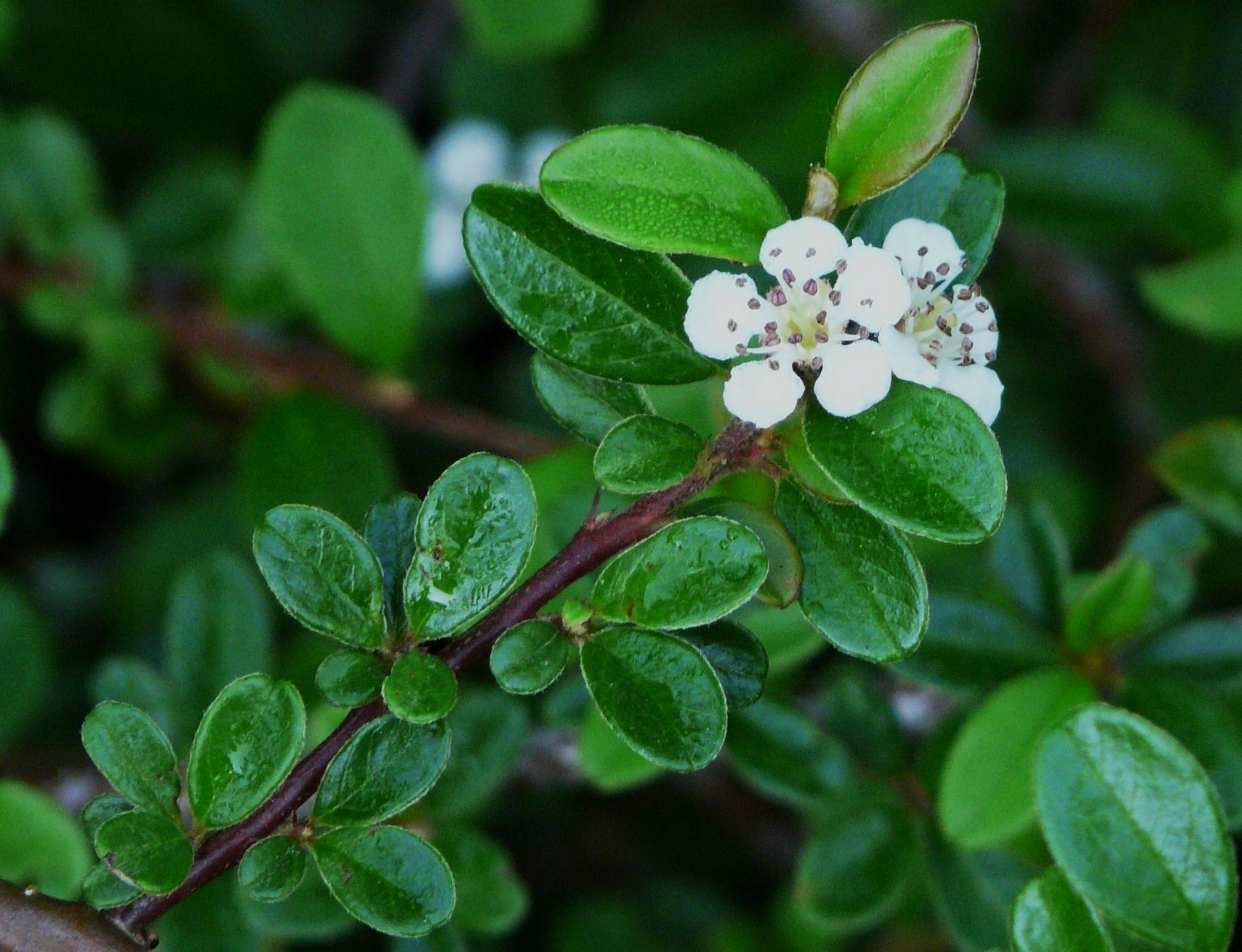
- Flowers

Scientific classification
- Kingdom: Plantae
- Clade: Embryophytes
- Clade: Tracheophytes
- Clade: Angiosperms
- Clade: Eudicots
- Clade: Rosids
- Order: Rosales
- Family: Rosaceae
- Genus: Cotoneaster
- Species: C. dammeri

Binomial name
- Cotoneaster dammeri C.K.Schneid., 1906

= Cotoneaster dammeri =

Species of flowering plant

Cotoneaster dammeri, the bearberry cotoneaster, is a species of flowering plant in the genus Cotoneaster, belonging to the family Rosaceae, native to central and southern China (Gansu, Guizhou, Hubei, Sichuan, Tibet and Yunnan) and naturalized in Europe.

== Description ==
It is a fast-growing evergreen low shrub with creeping branches. It reaches 30–40 centimetres (12–16 in) in height. Leaves are elliptical and leathery, with very fine tips and entire edges, about 8–20 millimetres (0.31–0.79 in) long. The surface is glossy and dark green while the underside is gray-green. The leaves turn purple in autumn. The fragrant flowers are usually single or 2-3 together in leaf axils. They are white with pink outer sides, about 4–5 millimetres (0.16–0.20 in) in diameter, with about twenty stamens and purple anthers. The flowering period extends from May through June. Fruits are bright red subglobose berries, about 6–7 millimetres (0.24–0.28 in) in diameter, remaining well into winter. The root system consists of finely branched and very shallow roots. The branches form roots at nodes when they touch the ground.

== Habitat ==
Cotoneaster dammeri grows in mountainous regions, on cliff sides and in open, mixed forests on dry and calcareous soils, at elevations between 1,300 metres (4,300 ft) and 4,000 metres (13,000 ft) above sea level.

== Cultivation ==
Cotoneaster dammeri is commonly used as an ornamental plant. Cultivars include:

- Cotoneaster dammeri 'Radicans'
- Cotoneaster dammeri 'Skogholm'
- Cotoneaster dammeri 'Royal beauty'

== Gallery ==
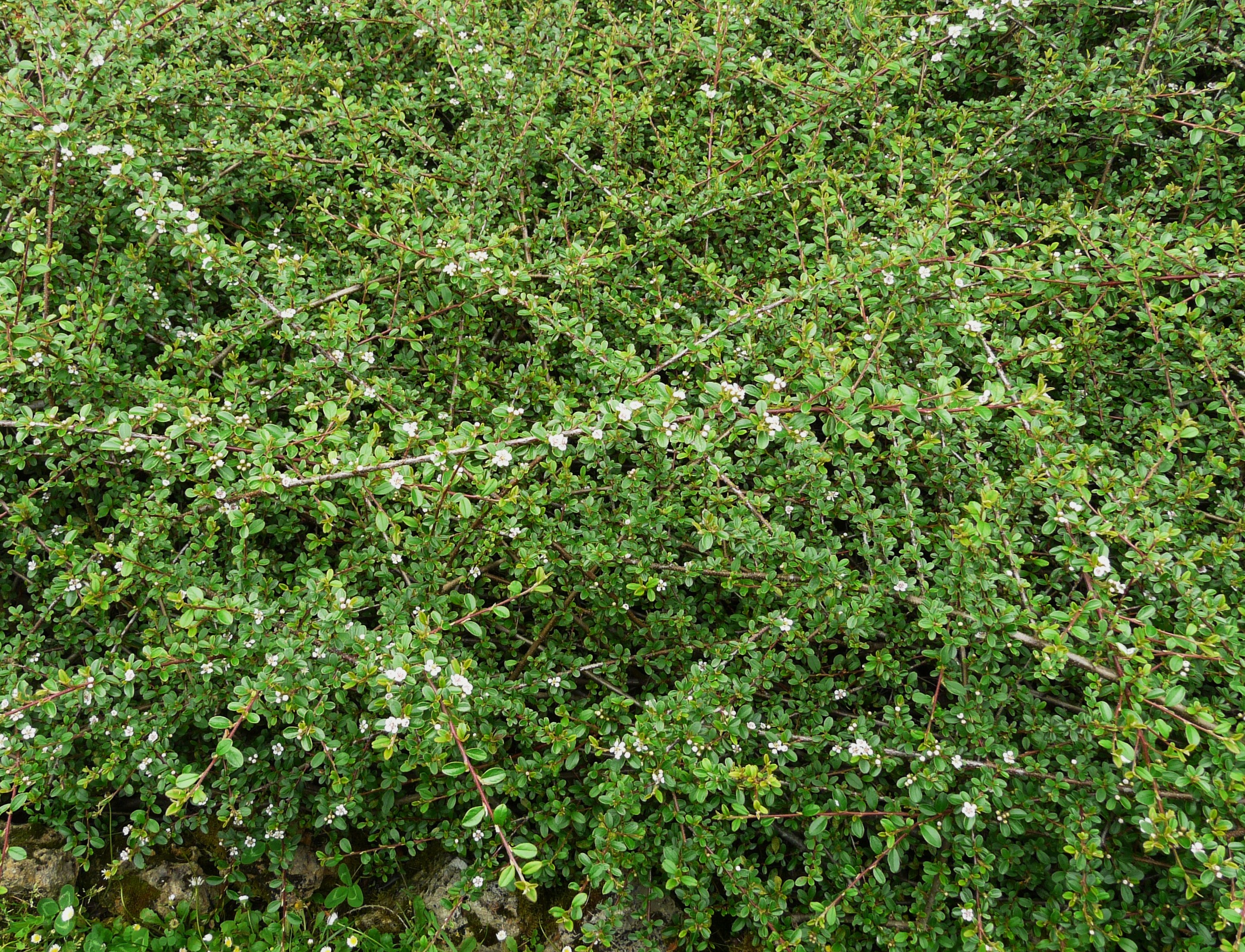
Plant of Cotoneaster dammeri

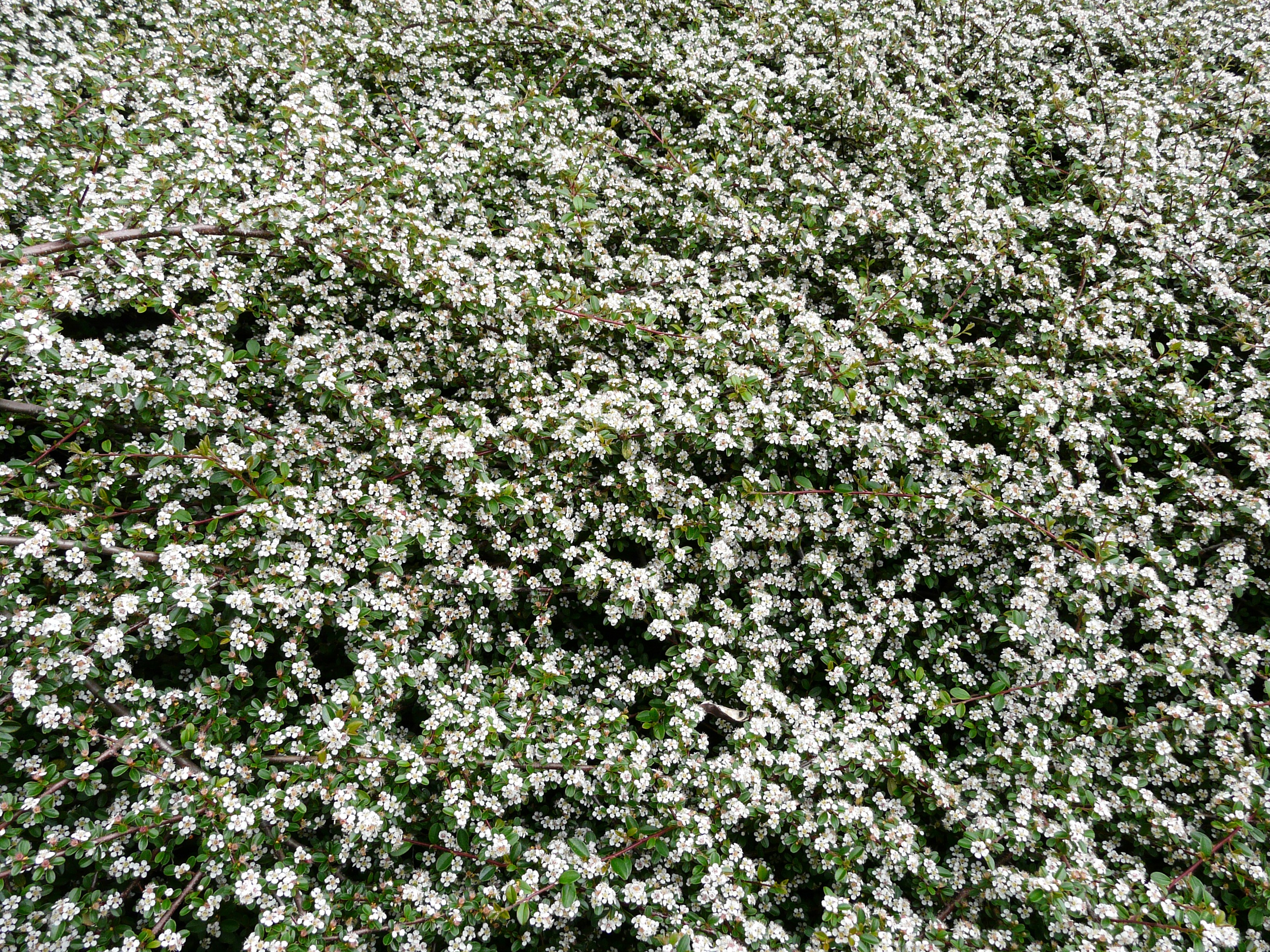
Flowers

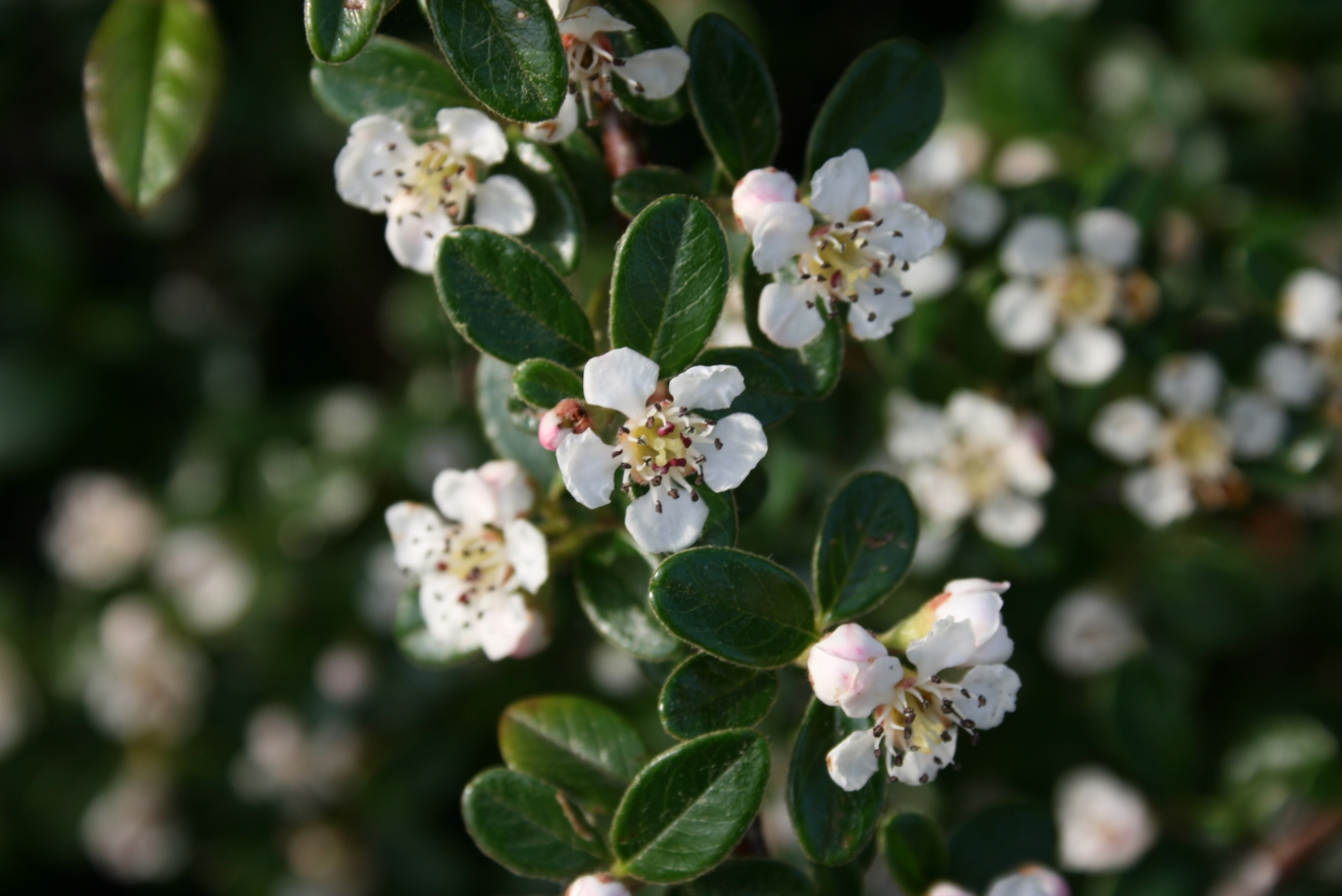
Flowers of Cotoneaster dammeri

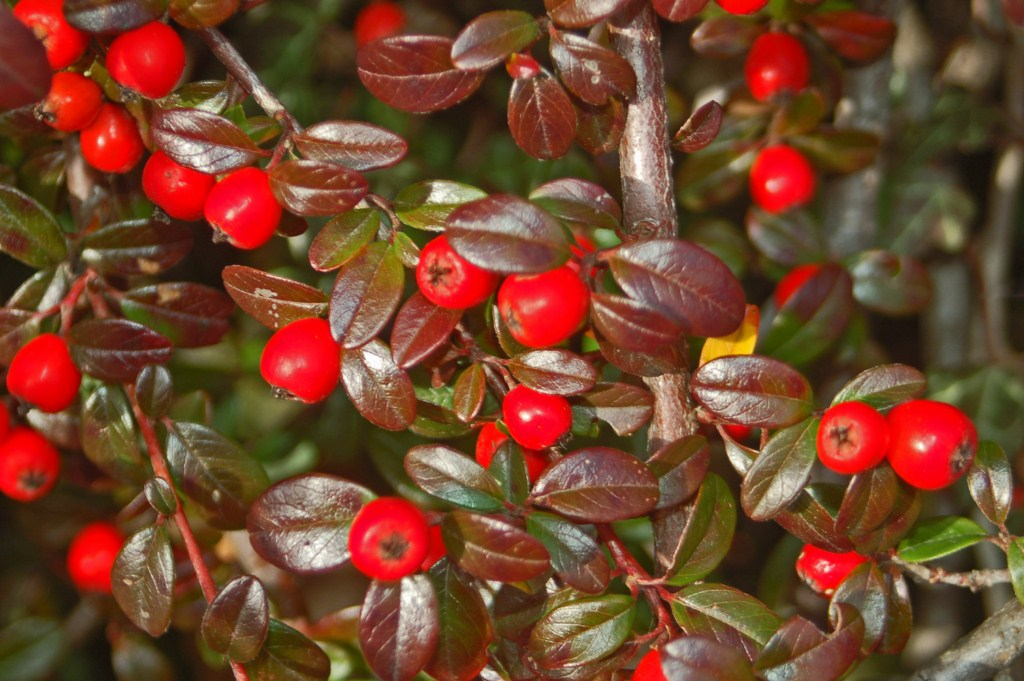
Leaves and berries of Cotoneaster dammeri in Winter

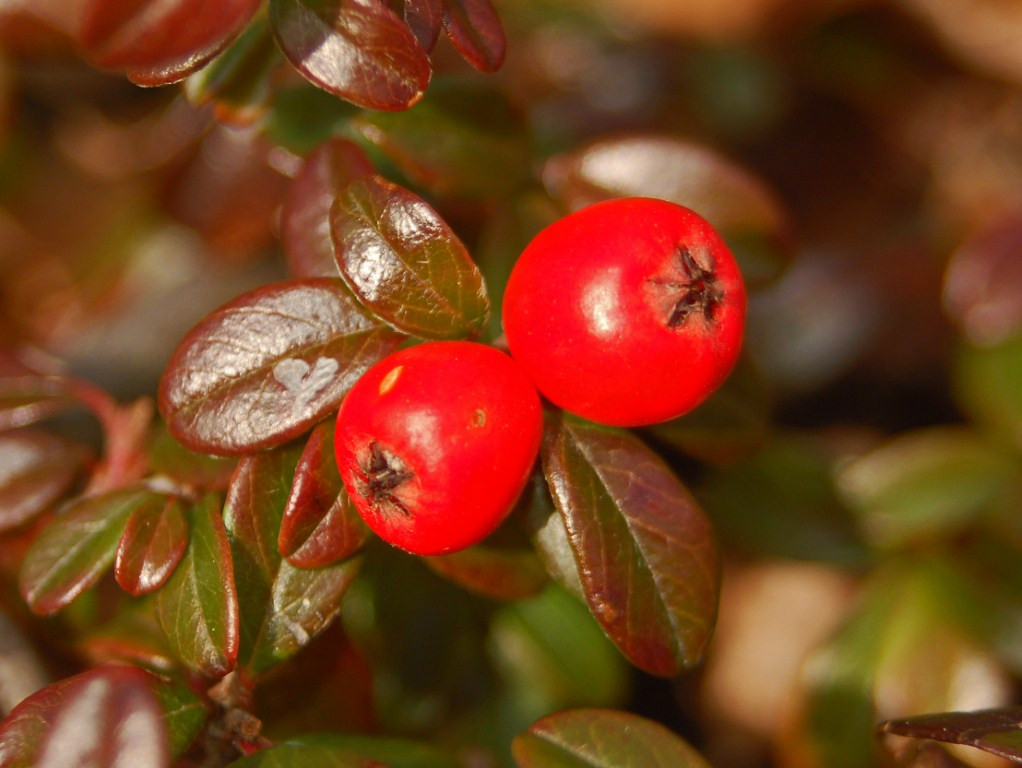
Close-up on berries of Cotoneaster dammeri in Winter
