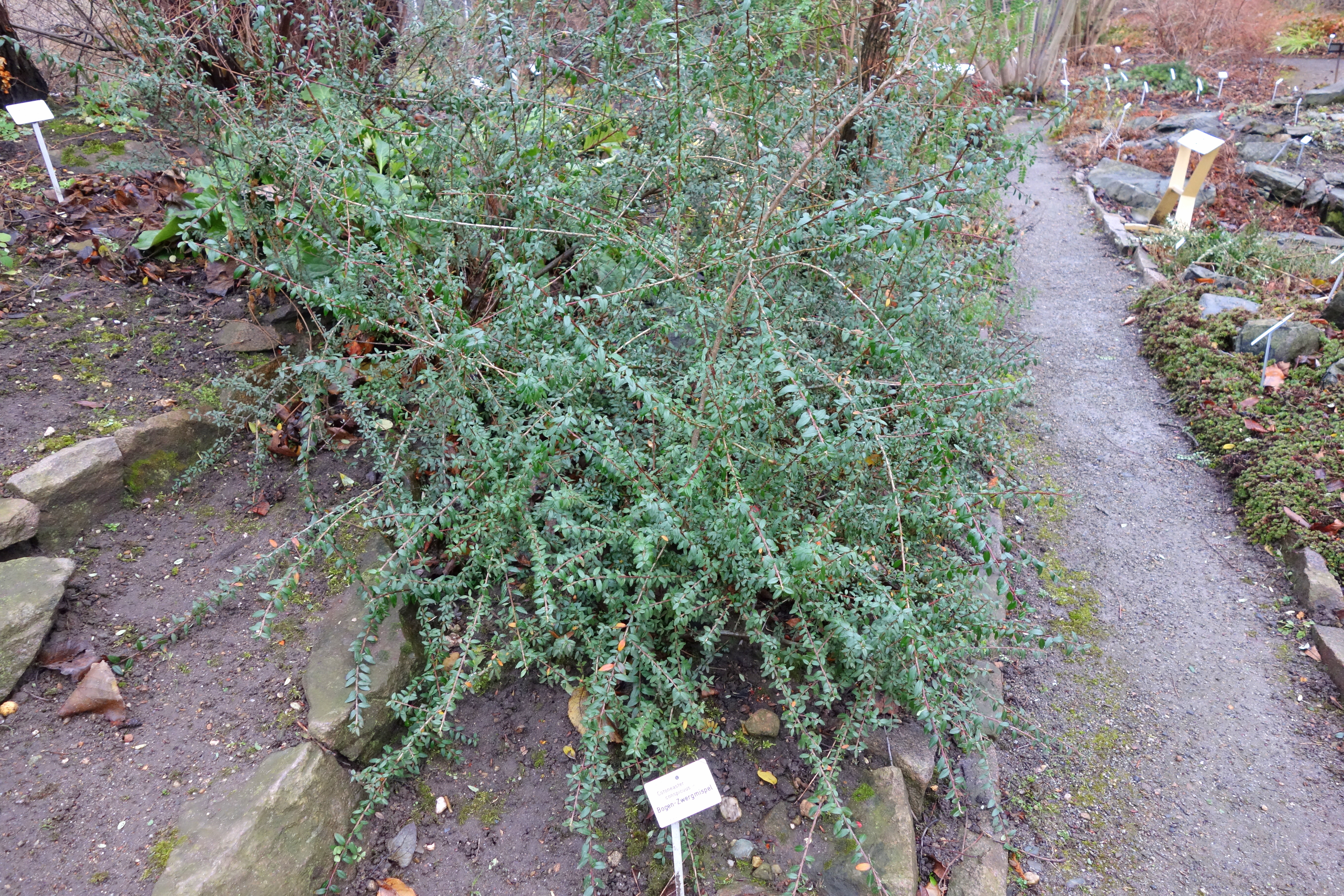

Scientific classification
- Kingdom: Plantae
- Clade: Tracheophytes
- Clade: Angiosperms
- Clade: Eudicots
- Clade: Rosids
- Order: Rosales
- Family: Rosaceae
- Genus: Cotoneaster
- Species: C. conspicuus

Binomial name
- Cotoneaster conspicuus J.B.Comber ex C.Marquand

= Cotoneaster conspicuus =

Species of flowering plant

Cotoneaster conspicuus (Tibetan cotoneaster, 大果栒子 da guo xun zi) is a slow-growing, densely-branched, evergreen shrub native to southeast Tibet. It grows to 1 to 1.5 meters in height, with white five-stellate flowers followed by scarlet fruit, 8–10 mm in diameter.

The cultivar 'Decorus' has gained the Royal Horticultural Society's Award of Garden Merit.

== Synonyms ==
- Cotoneaster conspicuus (Messel) Messel
- Cotoneaster conspicuus var. decorus P.G.Russell
- Cotoneaster microphyllus var. conspicuus Messel
