= Cotoneaster elegans =

Scientific classification
- Kingdom: Plantae
- Clade: Tracheophytes
- Clade: Angiosperms
- Clade: Eudicots
- Clade: Rosids
- Order: Rosales
- Family: Rosaceae
- Genus: Cotoneaster
- Species: C. elegans

Binomial name
- Cotoneaster elegans (Rehder & E.H.Wilson) Flinck & B.Hylmö, 1962

Synonyms
- Cotoneaster dielsianus var. elegans Rehder & E.H.Wilson (1912)

Species of flowering plant

Cotoneaster elegans is a plant species in the genus Cotoneaster found in dense forests (2000–3000 m) in Guizhou and Sichuan, China.
