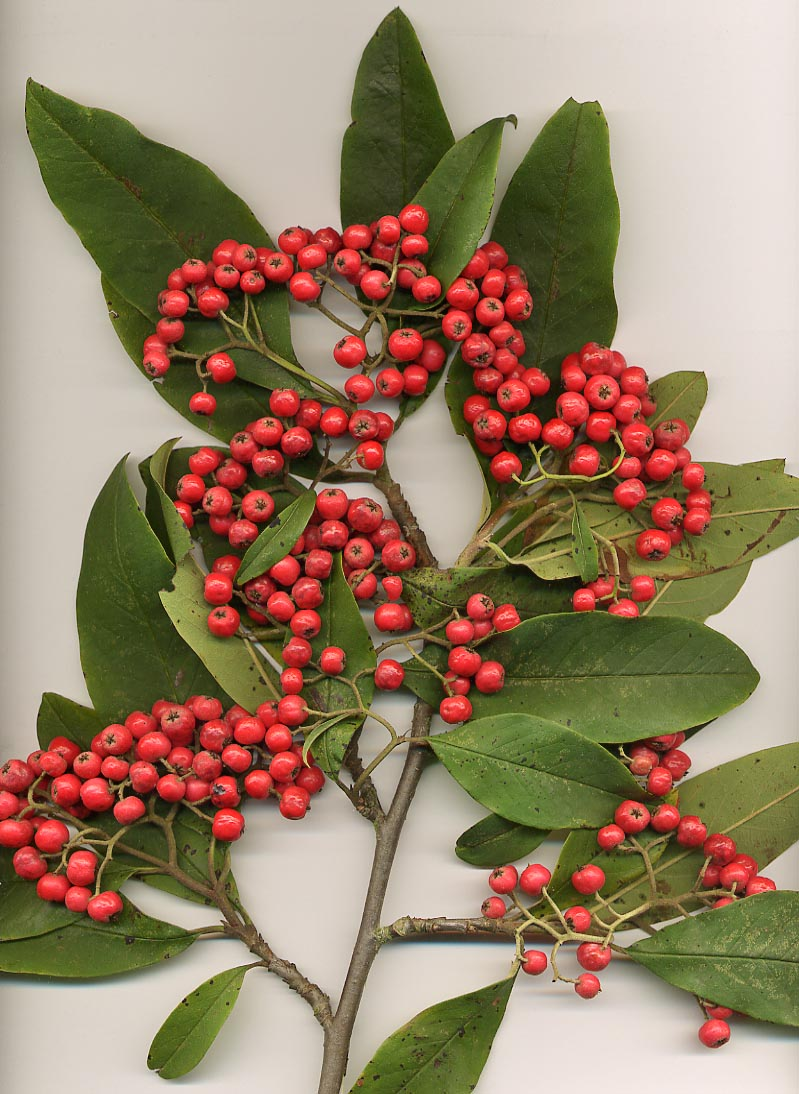
- Cotoneaster frigidus foliage and fruit

Scientific classification
- Kingdom: Plantae
- Clade: Tracheophytes
- Clade: Angiosperms
- Clade: Eudicots
- Clade: Rosids
- Order: Rosales
- Family: Rosaceae
- Subfamily: Amygdaloideae
- Tribe: Maleae
- Subtribe: Malinae
- Genus: Cotoneaster; Medik.

Type species
- Cotoneaster integerrimus Medik.

Species
- See here

Synonyms
- Cotonea Raf.; Gymnopyrenium Dulac; Ostinia Clairv.

= Cotoneaster =

Genus of flowering plants

Cotoneaster /kəˈtoʊniːˈæstər/ is a genus of flowering plants in the rose family, Rosaceae, native to the Palaearctic region (temperate Asia, Europe, north Africa), with a strong concentration of diversity in the genus in the mountains of southwestern China and the Himalayas. They are related to hawthorns (Crataegus), firethorns (Pyracantha), photinias (Photinia), and rowans (Sorbus).

Depending on the species definition used, between 70 and 300 different species of Cotoneaster are described, with many apomictic microspecies treated as species by some authors, but only as varieties by others.

== Description ==
=== Vegetative characteristics ===
The majority of species are shrubs from 0.5–5 m (1.6–16.4 ft) tall, varying from ground-hugging prostrate plants to erect shrubs; a few, notably C. frigidus, are small to medium-size trees up to 15 m (49 ft) tall and 75 cm (30 in) trunk diameter. The prostrate species are mostly alpine plants growing at high altitudes (e.g. C. integrifolius, which grows at 3,000–4,000 m (9,800–13,100 ft) in the Himalayas), while the larger species occur in scrub and woodland gaps at lower altitudes. The shoots are dimorphic, with long shoots (10–40 cm (3.9–15.7 in) long) producing structural branch growth, and short shoots (0.5–5 cm (0.20–1.97 in) long) bearing the flowers; this pattern often developing a 'herringbone' form of branching. The leaves are arranged alternately, 0.5–15 cm (0.20–5.91 in) long, ovate to lanceolate in shape, entire; both evergreen and deciduous species occur.

=== Generative characteristics ===
Flowers are produced from late spring to early summer, either solitarily or in corymbs of up to 100 flowers. The flower is either fully open or has its five petals partially open, with a diameter of approximately 5–10 mm (0.20–0.39 in) meters. They may be any shade from white through creamy white to light pink to dark pink to almost red, 10–20 stamens and up to five styles. The fruit is a small pome measuring approximately 5–12 mm (0.20–0.47 in) in diameter, and it can be pink or bright red, orange or even maroon or black when mature, containing one to three (rarely up to five) seeds. Fruit on some species stays on until the following year.

Fruits of a Cotoneaster.

== Taxonomy ==
It was described by Friedrich Kasimir Medikus in 1789 with Cotoneaster integerrimus Medik. as the type species. The genus name Cotoneaster derives from cotoneum, a Latin name for the quince, and the suffix -aster, 'resembling'. The name is correctly masculine, though in some older works it was wrongly treated as feminine, resulting in different name endings for many of the species (e.g.Cotoneaster integerrima instead of Cotoneaster integerrimus).

The genus is often divided into two or more sections, though the situation is complicated by hybridisation:

- Cotoneaster sect. Cotoneaster (syn. sect. Orthopetalum). Flowers solitary or up to 6 together; petals forward-pointing, often tinged pink. Mostly smaller shrubs.
- Cotoneaster sect. Chaenopetalum. Flowers more than 20 together in corymbs; petals opening flat, creamy white. Mostly larger shrubs.

=== Species ===
- Cotoneaster acuminatus Lindl.
- Cotoneaster acutifolius Turcz. – Peking cotoneaster
- Cotoneaster acutiusculus Pojark.
- Cotoneaster adpressus Bois – creeping cotoneaster
- Cotoneaster aestivalis (Walter) Wenz.
- Cotoneaster affinis Lindl. – purpleberry cotoneaster
- Cotoneaster afghanicus G.Klotz
- Cotoneaster aitchisoni C.K.Schneid.
- Cotoneaster alashanensis J.Fryer & B.Hylmö
- Cotoneaster alatavicus Popov
- Cotoneaster alaunicus Golitsin
- Cotoneaster albokermesinus J.Fryer & B.Hylmö
- Cotoneaster allanderi J.Fryer
- Cotoneaster allochrous Pojark.
- Cotoneaster altaicus J.Fryer & B.Hylmö
- Cotoneaster ambiguus Rehder & E.H.Wilson
- Cotoneaster amoenus E.H.Wilson – beautiful cotoneaster
- Cotoneaster amphigenus Chaten.
- Cotoneaster annapurnae J.Fryer & B.Hylmö
- Cotoneaster angustifolius Franch.
- Cotoneaster angustus (T.T.Yu) G.Klotz
- Cotoneaster antoninae Juz. & N.I.Orlova
- Cotoneaster apiculatus Rehder & E.H.Wilson – cranberry cotoneaster or apiculate cotoneaster
- Cotoneaster applanatus Duthie ex J.H.Veitch
- Cotoneaster arborescens Zabel.
- Cotoneaster arbusculus G.Klotz
- Cotoneaster argenteus G.Klotz
- Cotoneaster armenus Pojark.
- Cotoneaster arvernensis Gand.
- Cotoneaster ascendens Flinck & B.Hylmö – ascending cotoneaster
- Cotoneaster assadii Khat.
- Cotoneaster assamensis G.Klotz
- Cotoneaster astrophoros J.Fryer & E.C.Nelson – starry cotoneaster
- Cotoneaster ataensis J.Fryer & B.Hylmö
- Cotoneaster atlanticus G.Klotz
- Cotoneaster atropurpureus Flinck & B.Hylmö – purple-flowered cotoneaster
- Cotoneaster atrovirens J.Fryer & B.Hylmö
- Cotoneaster atuntzensis J.Fryer & B.Hylmö
- Cotoneaster auranticus J.Fryer & B.Hylmö
- Cotoneaster bacillaris Wall. ex Lindl. – open-fruited cotoneaster
- Cotoneaster baenitzii Pax
- Cotoneaster bakeri G.Klotz
- Cotoneaster balticus J.Fryer & B.Hylmö
- Cotoneaster bilokonii Grevtsova
- Cotoneaster bisramianus G.Klotz
- Cotoneaster bitahaiensis J.Fryer & B.Hylmö
- Cotoneaster blinii H.Lév.
- Cotoneaster bodinieri H.Lév.
- Cotoneaster boisianus G.Klotz – Bois's cotoneaster
- Cotoneaster borealichinensis (Hurus.) Hurus.
- Cotoneaster borealis Petz. & G.Kirchn.
- Cotoneaster brachypodus Pojark. ex Zakirov
- Cotoneaster bradyi E.C.Nelson J.Fryer – Brady's cotoneaster
- Cotoneaster brandisii G.Klotz
- Cotoneaster brevirameus Rehder & Wilson
- Cotoneaster brickelli J.Fryer & B.Hylmö
- Cotoneaster browiczii J.Fryer & B.Hylmö
- Cotoneaster bullatus Bois – hollyberry cotoneaster
- Cotoneaster bumthangensis J.Fryer & B.Hylmö
- Cotoneaster burmanicus G.Klotz
- Cotoneaster buxifolius Wall. ex Lindl. – box-leaved cotoneaster
- Cotoneaster californicus A.Murray bis
- Cotoneaster calocarpus (Rehder & E.H.Wilson) Flinck & B.Hylmö – Sikang cotoneaster
- Cotoneaster cambricus J.Fryer & B.Hylmö – wild cotoneaster
- Cotoneaster camilli-schneideri Pojark.
- Cotoneaster campanulatus J.Fryer & B.Hylmö
- Cotoneaster canescens Vestergr. ex B.Hylmö
- Cotoneaster capsicinus J.Fryer & B.Hylmö
- Cotoneaster cardinalis J.Fryer & B.Hylmö
- Cotoneaster cashmiriensis G.Klotz – Kashmir cotoneaster
- Cotoneaster cavei G.Klotz
- Cotoneaster chaffanjonii H.Lév.
- Cotoneaster chailaricus (G.Klotz) Flinck & B.Hylmö
- Cotoneaster chengkangensis T.T.Yu
- Cotoneaster chrysobotrys Hand. – Mazz.
- Cotoneaster chulingensis J.Fryer & B.Hylmö
- Cotoneaster chungtiensis J.Fryer & B.Hylmö
- Cotoneaster cinerascens (Rehder) Flinck & B.Hylmö
- Cotoneaster cinnabarinus Juz.
- Cotoneaster coadunatus J.Fryer & B.Hylmö
- Cotoneaster coccineus Steud.
- Cotoneaster cochleatus (Franch.) G.Klotz – Yunnan cotoneaster
- Cotoneaster commixtus (C.K.Schneid.) Flinck & B.Hylmö
- Cotoneaster comptus Lem.
- Cotoneaster confusus G.Klotz
- Cotoneaster congestus Baker – congested cotoneaster
- Cotoneaster conspicuus C.Marquand – Tibetan cotoneaster
- Cotoneaster convexus J.Fryer & B.Hylmö
- Cotoneaster cooperi C.Marquand – Cooper's cotoneaster
- Cotoneaster cordatus Focke
- Cotoneaster cordifolioides G.Klotz
- Cotoneaster cordifolius G.Klotz
- Cotoneaster coreanus H.Lév.
- Cotoneaster coriaceus Franch.
- Cotoneaster cornifolius Rehder & E.H.Wilson
- Cotoneaster cossineus Steud.
- Cotoneaster crenulatus (D.Don) K.Koch
- Cotoneaster creticus J.Fryer & B.Hylmö
- Cotoneaster crispii Exell
- Cotoneaster cuilus Lee ex K.Koch
- Cotoneaster cuspidatus C.Marquand ex J.Fryer
- Cotoneaster daliensis J.Fryer & B.Hylmö
- Cotoneaster dammeri C.K.Schneid. – bearberry cotoneaster
- Cotoneaster daralagesicus Grevtsova
- Cotoneaster davidianus hort. ex Dippel
- Cotoneaster decandrus J.Fryer & B.Hylmö
- Cotoneaster declinatus J.Fryer & B.Hylmö
- Cotoneaster degenensis J.Fryer & B.Hylmö
- Cotoneaster delavayanus G.Klotz
- Cotoneaster delphinensis Chatenier
- Cotoneaster denticulatus Kunth
- Cotoneaster dielsianus E.Pritz. ex Diels – Diels' cotoneaster
- Cotoneaster difficilis G.Klotz
- Cotoneaster discolor Pojark.
- Cotoneaster dissimilis G.Klotz
- Cotoneaster distichus Lange
- Cotoneaster divaricatus Rehder & E.H.Wilson – spreading cotoneaster
- Cotoneaster dojamensis J.Fryer & B.Hylmö
- Cotoneaster dokeriensis G.Klotz
- Cotoneaster drogochius J.Fryer & B.Hylmö
- Cotoneaster duthieanus (C.K.Schneid.) G.Klotz
- Cotoneaster elatus G.Klotz
- Cotoneaster elegans (Rehder & E.H.Wilson) Flinck & B.Hylmö
- Cotoneaster ellipticus (Lindl.) Loudon – Lindley's cotoneaster
- Cotoneaster emarginatus hort. ex K.Koch
- Cotoneaster emeiensis J.Fryer & B.Hylmö
- Cotoneaster encavei J.Fryer & B.Hylmö
- Cotoneaster eriocarpus hort.
- Cotoneaster erratus J.Fryer & B.Hylmö
- Cotoneaster erzincanicus J.Fryer
- Cotoneaster esfandiarii Khat.
- Cotoneaster esquirolii H.Lév.
- Cotoneaster estonicus J.Fryer & B.Hylmö
- Cotoneaster falconeri G.Klotz
- Cotoneaster fangianus T.T.Yu – Fang's cotoneaster
- Cotoneaster farreri Klotzsch
- Cotoneaster fastigiatus J.Fryer & B.Hylmö
- Cotoneaster favargeri J.Fryer & B.Hylmö
- Cotoneaster fletcheri G.Klotz
- Cotoneaster flinckii J.Fryer & B.Hylmö
- Cotoneaster floccosus (Rehder & E.H.Wilson) Flinck & B.Hylmö
- Cotoneaster floridus J.Fryer & B.Hylmö
- Cotoneaster fontanesii Grossh.
- Cotoneaster formosanus Hayata
- Cotoneaster forrestii G.Klotz
- Cotoneaster fortunei Wenz.
- Cotoneaster foveolatus Rehder & E.H.Wilson
- Cotoneaster franchetii Bois – Franchet's cotoneaster or orange cotoneaster
- Cotoneaster frigidus Wall. ex Lindl. – tree cotoneaster
- Cotoneaster froebelii Vilm.
- Cotoneaster fruticosus J.Fryer & B.Hylmö
- Cotoneaster fulvidus (W.W.Sm.) G.Klotz
- Cotoneaster gamblei G.Klotz
- Cotoneaster ganghobaensis J.Fryer & B.Hylmö
- Cotoneaster garhwalensis G.Klotz
- Cotoneaster genitianus Hurus. ex Nakai
- Cotoneaster gesneri Kirschl.
- Cotoneaster gilgitensis G.Klotz
- Cotoneaster girardii Flinck & B.Hylmö ex G.Klotz
- Cotoneaster glabratus Rehder & E.H.Wilson – glabrous cotoneaster
- Cotoneaster glacialis (Hook.f. ex Wenz.) Panigrahi & Arv.Kumar
- Cotoneaster glaucophyllus Franch. – glaucous cotoneaster
- Cotoneaster globosus (Hurus.) G.Klotz
- Cotoneaster glomerulatus W.W.Sm.
- Cotoneaster goloskokovii Pojark.
- Cotoneaster gonggashanensis J.Fryer & B.Hylmö
- Cotoneaster gotlandicus B.Hylmö
- Cotoneaster gracilis Rehder & E.H.Wilson
- Cotoneaster grammontii hort. ex K.Koch
- Cotoneaster granatensis Boiss
- Cotoneaster griffithii G.Klotz
- Cotoneaster guanmenensis J.Fryer
- Cotoneaster handel-mazzettii G.Klotz
- Cotoneaster harrovianus E.H.Wilson
- Cotoneaster harrysmithii Flinck & B.Hylmö
- Cotoneaster hebephyllus Diels
- Cotoneaster hedegaardii J.Fryer & B.Hylmö
- Cotoneaster henryanus (C.K.Schneid.) Rehder & E.H.Wilson – Henry's cotoneaster
- Cotoneaster hersianus J.Fryer & B.Hylmö
- Cotoneaster heterophyllus J.Fryer
- Cotoneaster hicksii J.Fryer & B.Hylmö
- Cotoneaster himaleiensis hort. ex Zabel
- Cotoneaster himalayensis hort. ex Lavallee
- Cotoneaster hissaricus Pojark. – circular-leaved cotoneaster
- Cotoneaster hjelmqvistii Flinck & B.Hylmö – Hjelmqvist's cotoneaster
- Cotoneaster hodjingensis G.Klotz
- Cotoneaster hookeri hort. ex Zabel
- Cotoneaster hookerianus hort. ex Lavallee
- Cotoneaster horizontalis Decne. – wall cotoneaster or rock cotoneaster
- Cotoneaster hsingshangensis J.Fryer & B.Hylmö – Hsing-Shan cotoneaster
- Cotoneaster hualiensis J.Fryer & B.Hylmö
- Cotoneaster humifusus Duthie ex J.H.Veitch
- Cotoneaster humilis Donn
- Cotoneaster hummelii J.Fryer & B.Hylmö – Hummel's cotoneaster
- Cotoneaster hunanensis J.Fryer & B.Hylmö
- Cotoneaster hupehensis Rehder & E.H.Wilson – Hupeh cotoneaster
- Cotoneaster hurusawaianus G.Klotz – Hurusawa's cotoneaster
- Cotoneaster hylanderi B.Hylmö & J.Fryer
- Cotoneaster hymalaicus Carriere
- Cotoneaster hylmoei Flinck & J.Fryer – Hylmö's cotoneaster
- Cotoneaster hypocarpus J.Fryer & B.Hylmö
- Cotoneaster ichangensis G.Klotz
- Cotoneaster ignavus E.L.Wolf
- Cotoneaster ignescens J.Fryer & B.Hylmö – firebird cotoneaster
- Cotoneaster ignotus G.Klotz – black-grape cotoneaster
- Cotoneaster improvisus Klotzsch
- Cotoneaster incanus (W.W.Sm.) G.Klotz
- Cotoneaster induratus J.Fryer & B.Hylmö – hardy cotoneaster
- Cotoneaster inexspectus G.Klotz
- Cotoneaster insculptus Diels – engraved cotoneaster
- Cotoneaster insignis Pojark.
- Cotoneaster insignoides J.Fryer & B.Hylmö
- Cotoneaster insolitus G.Klotz
- Cotoneaster integerrimus Medik.
- Cotoneaster integrifolius (Roxb.) G.Klotz – entire-leaved cotoneaster
- Cotoneaster intermedius (Lecoq. & Lamotte) H.J.Coste
- Cotoneaster japonicus hort. ex Dippel
- Cotoneaster juranus Gand.
- Cotoneaster kaganensis G.Klotz
- Cotoneaster kamaoensis G.Klotz
- Cotoneaster kangtinensis G.Klotz
- Cotoneaster kansuensis G.Klotz
- Cotoneaster karatavicus Pojark.
- Cotoneaster karelicus J.Fryer & B.Hylmö
- Cotoneaster kaschkarovii Pojark.
- Cotoneaster kerstanii G.Klotz
- Cotoneaster khasiensis G.Klotz
- Cotoneaster kingdonii J.Fryer & B.Hylmö
- Cotoneaster kirgizicus Grevtsova
- Cotoneaster kitaibelii J.Fryer & B.Hylmö
- Cotoneaster klotzii J.Fryer & B.Hylmö
- Cotoneaster koizumii Hayata
- Cotoneaster kongboensis G.Klotz
- Cotoneaster konishii Hayata
- Cotoneaster kotschyi (C.K.Schneid.) G.Klotz
- Cotoneaster krasnovii Pojark.
- Cotoneaster kullensis B.Hylmö
- Cotoneaster kweitschoviensis G.Klotz
- Cotoneaster lacei Klotzsch
- Cotoneaster lacteus W.W.Sm. – milkflower cotoneaster or late cotoneaster
- Cotoneaster laetevirens (Rehder & E.H.Wilson) G.Klotz
- Cotoneaster laevis hort. ex Steud.
- Cotoneaster lambertii G.Klotz
- Cotoneaster lamprofolius J.Fryer & B.Hylmö
- Cotoneaster lanatus hort. ex Regel
- Cotoneaster lancasteri J.Fryer & B.Hylmö
- Cotoneaster langei G.Klotz
- Cotoneaster langtangensis B.Hylmö
- Cotoneaster lanshanensis J.Fryer & B.Hylmö
- Cotoneaster latifolius J.Fryer & B.Hylmö
- Cotoneaster laxiflorus Jacq. ex Lindl.
- Cotoneaster lesliei J.Fryer & B.Hylmö
- Cotoneaster leveillei J.Fryer & B.Hylmö
- Cotoneaster lidjiangensis G.Klotz – Lidjiang cotoneaster
- Cotoneaster lindleyi Steud.
- Cotoneaster linearifolius (G.Klotz) G.Klotz
- Cotoneaster logginovae Grevtsova
- Cotoneaster lomahunensis J.Fryer & B.Hylmö
- Cotoneaster lucidus Schltdl. – hedge cotoneaster or shiny cotoneaster
- Cotoneaster ludlowii G.Klotz
- Cotoneaster luristanicus G.Klotz
- Cotoneaster macrocarpus J.Fryer & B.Hylmö
- Cotoneaster magnificus J.Fryer & B.Hylmö
- Cotoneaster mairei H.Lév. – Maire's cotoneaster
- Cotoneaster majusculus (W.W.Sm.) G.Klotz
- Cotoneaster marginatus (Loudon) Schltdl. – fringed cotoneaster
- Cotoneaster marquandii G.Klotz
- Cotoneaster marroninus J.Fryer & B.Hylmö
- Cotoneaster mathonnetii Gand.
- Cotoneaster matrensis Domokos
- Cotoneaster megalocarpus Popov
- Cotoneaster meiophyllus (W.W.Sm.) G.Klotz
- Cotoneaster melanocarpus Lodd. – black-fruited cotoneaster or black cotoneaster
- Cotoneaster melanotrichus (Franch.) G.Klotz
- Cotoneaster meuselii G.Klotz
- Cotoneaster meyeri Pojark.
- Cotoneaster microcarpus (Rehder & E.H.Wilson) Flinck & B.Hylmö
- Cotoneaster microphyllus Wall. ex Lindl. – small-leaved cotoneaster or rockspray cotoneaster
- Cotoneaster milkedandai J.Fryer & B.Hylmö
- Cotoneaster mingkwongensis G.Klotz
- Cotoneaster miniatus (Rehder & E.H.Wilson) Flinck & B.Hylmö
- Cotoneaster minimus J.Fryer & B.Hylmö
- Cotoneaster minitomentellus J.Fryer & B.Hylmö
- Cotoneaster minutus G.Klotz
- Cotoneaster mirabilis G.Klotz & Krugel
- Cotoneaster misturatus J.Fryer
- Cotoneaster mongolicus Pojark.
- Cotoneaster monopyrenus (W.W.Sm.) Flinck & B.Hylmö – one-stoned cotoneaster
- Cotoneaster montanus Lange ex Dippel
- Cotoneaster morrisonensis Hayata
- Cotoneaster morulus Pojark.
- Cotoneaster moupinensis Franch. – Moupin cotoneaster
- Cotoneaster mucronatus Franch. – mucronate cotoneaster
- Cotoneaster muliensis G.Klotz
- Cotoneaster multiflorus Bunge – showy cotoneaster
- Cotoneaster nagaensis G.Klotz
- Cotoneaster nakai Hayata
- Cotoneaster naninitens J.Fryer & B.Hylmö
- Cotoneaster nanshan M.Vilm. ex Mottet – dwarf cotoneaster
- Cotoneaster nantaouensis J.Fryer & B.Hylmö
- Cotoneaster nanus (G.Klotz) G.Klotz
- Cotoneaster narynensis Tkatsch. ex J.Fryer & B.Hylmö
- Cotoneaster nebrodensis (Guss.) K.Koch
- Cotoneaster nedoluzhkoi Tzvelev.
- Cotoneaster nefedovii Galushko
- Cotoneaster neo-antoninae A.N.Vassiljeva
- Cotoneaster neopopovii Czerep.
- Cotoneaster nepalensis hort. ex K.Koch
- Cotoneaster nervosus Decne
- Cotoneaster nevadensis Boiss. ex Steud.
- Cotoneaster newryensis Lemoine
- Cotoneaster niger (Wahlenb.) Fries
- Cotoneaster nitens Rehder & E.H.Wilson – few-flowered cotoneaster or pinkblush cotoneaster
- Cotoneaster nitidifolius Marquand
- Cotoneaster nitidus Jacques – distichous cotoneaster
- Cotoneaster nivalis (G.Klotz) G.Panigrahi & A.Kumar
- Cotoneaster nohelii J.Fryer & B.Hylmö
- Cotoneaster notabilis G.Klotz
- Cotoneaster nudiflorus J.Fryer & B.Hylmö
- Cotoneaster nummularioides Pojark.
- Cotoneaster nummularius Fisch. & Mey.
- Cotoneaster obovatus Osmaston
- Cotoneaster obscurus Rehder & E.H.Wilson – bloodberry cotoneaster or obscure cotoneaster
- Cotoneaster obtusisepalus Gand.
- Cotoneaster obtusus Wall. ex Lindl.
- Cotoneaster oliganthus Pojark.
- Cotoneaster oligocarpus C.K.Schneid.
- Cotoneaster omissus J.Fryer & B.Hylmö
- Cotoneaster orbicularis Schltdl.
- Cotoneaster orientalis (Mill.) Borbas
- Cotoneaster osmastonii G.Klotz
- Cotoneaster ottoschwarzii G.Klotz
- Cotoneaster ovatus Pojark.
- Cotoneaster pangiensis G.Klotz
- Cotoneaster pannosus Franch. – silverleaf cotoneaster
- Cotoneaster paradoxus G.Klotz
- Cotoneaster parkeri G.Klotz
- Cotoneaster parkinsonii Panigrahi & Arv.Kumar
- Cotoneaster parnassicus Boiss. & Heldr.
- Cotoneaster parvifolius (Hook.f.) Panigrahi & Arv.Kumar
- Cotoneaster peduncularis Boiss.
- Cotoneaster pekinensis (Koehne) Zabel
- Cotoneaster permutatus G.Klotz
- Cotoneaster perpusillus (C.K.Schneid.) Flinck & B.Hylmö – slender cotoneaster
- Cotoneaster poluninii G.Klotz
- Cotoneaster procumbens G.Klotz
- Cotoneaster prostratus Baker – procumbent cotoneaster
- Cotoneaster przewalskii Pojark.
- Cotoneaster pseudoambiguus J.Fryer & B.Hylmö – Kangting cotoneaster
- Cotoneaster racemiflorus K.Koch – redbead cotoneaster or rockspray cotoneaster
- Cotoneaster radicans G.Klotz – rooting cotoneaster
- Cotoneaster rehderi Pojark. – bullate cotoneaster
- Cotoneaster reticulatus Rehder & E.H.Wilson
- Cotoneaster rhytidophyllus Rehder & E.H.Wilson
- Cotoneaster roseus Edgew.
- Cotoneaster rotundifolius Wall. ex Lindl. – round-leaved cotoneaster
- Cotoneaster rubens W.W.Sm.
- Cotoneaster salicifolius Franch. – willow-leaved cotoneaster
- Cotoneaster salwinensis G.Klotz
- Cotoneaster sanbaensis J.Fryer
- Cotoneaster sandakphuensis G.Klotz
- Cotoneaster sanguineus T.T.Yu
- Cotoneaster sargentii G.Klotz
- Cotoneaster saxatilis Pojark.
- Cotoneaster saxonicus B.Hylmö
- Cotoneaster scandinavicus B.Hylmö
- Cotoneaster schantungensis G.Klotz
- Cotoneaster schlechtendalii G.Klotz
- Cotoneaster schubertii G.Klotz
- Cotoneaster serotinus Hutch.
- Cotoneaster shannanensis J.Fryer & B.Hylmö – Shannan cotoneaster
- Cotoneaster shansiensis J.Fryer & B.Hylmö
- Cotoneaster sherriffii G.Klotz – Sherriff's cotoneaster
- Cotoneaster sichuanensis Klotzsch
- Cotoneaster sikangensis J.Fryer & B.Hylmö
- Cotoneaster sikkimensis Mouill.
- Cotoneaster silvestrei Pamp.
- Cotoneaster simonsii Baker – Himalayan cotoneaster or Simons' cotoneaster
- Cotoneaster smithii G.Klotz
- Cotoneaster soczavianus Pojark.
- Cotoneaster soongaricus (Regel & Herder) Popov
- Cotoneaster sordidus G.Klotz
- Cotoneaster soulieanus G.Klotz
- Cotoneaster spathulatus (Michx.) Wenz.
- Cotoneaster splendens Flinck & B.Hylmö – showy cotoneaster
- Cotoneaster spongbergii J.Fryer & B.Hylmö
- Cotoneaster staintonii G.Klotz
- Cotoneaster sternianus (Turrill) Boom – Stern's cotoneaster
- Cotoneaster stracheyi Klotzsch
- Cotoneaster strigosus G.Klotz
- Cotoneaster suavis Pojark.
- Cotoneaster subacutus Pojark.
- Cotoneaster subadpressus T.T.Yu
- Cotoneaster subalpinus G.Klotz
- Cotoneaster submultiflorus Popov
- Cotoneaster suboblongus Gand.
- Cotoneaster subuniflorus (Kitam.) G.Klotz
- Cotoneaster suecicus G.Klotz
- Cotoneaster svenhedinii J.Fryer & B.Hylmö
- Cotoneaster taitoensis Hayata
- Cotoneaster taiwanensis J.Fryer & B.Hylmö
- Cotoneaster takpoensis G.Klotz
- Cotoneaster taksangensis J.Fryer & B.Hylmö
- Cotoneaster talgaricus Popov
- Cotoneaster tanpaensis J.Fryer & B.Hylmö
- Cotoneaster taoensis G.Klotz
- Cotoneaster tardiflorus J.Fryer & B.Hylmö
- Cotoneaster tauricus Pojark.
- Cotoneaster taylorii T.T.Yu
- Cotoneaster tebbutus J.Fryer & B.Hylmö
- Cotoneaster teijiashanensis J.Fryer & B.Hylmö
- Cotoneaster tengyuehensis J.Fryer & B.Hylmö – Tengyueh cotoneaster
- Cotoneaster tenuipes Rehder & E.H.Wilson – slender cotoneaster
- Cotoneaster thimphuensis J.Fryer & B.Hylmö
- Cotoneaster thymifolius Wall. ex Lindl. – thyme-leaved cotoneaster
- Cotoneaster tibeticus G.Klotz
- Cotoneaster tjuliniae Pojark. ex Peschkova
- Cotoneaster tkatschenkoi Grovtsova
- Cotoneaster tomentellus Pojark. – short-felted cotoneaster
- Cotoneaster tomentosus Lindl. – woolly cotoneaster
- Cotoneaster transcaucasicus Pojark.
- Cotoneaster transens G.Klotz
- Cotoneaster trinervis J.Fryer & B.Hylmö
- Cotoneaster tsarongensis J.Fryer & B.Hylmö
- Cotoneaster tumeticus Pojark.
- Cotoneaster turbinatus Craib
- Cotoneaster turcomanicus Pojark.
- Cotoneaster tytthocarpus Pojark.
- Cotoneaster undulatus J.Fryer & B.Hylmö
- Cotoneaster uniflorus Bunge – Altai cotoneaster
- Cotoneaster uralensis J.Fryer & B.Hylmö
- Cotoneaster uva-ursi G.Don
- Cotoneaster uva-ursinus (Lindl.) J.Fryer & B.Hylmö
- Cotoneaster uzbezicus Grevtsova
- Cotoneaster vandelaarii J.Fryer & B.Hylmö
- Cotoneaster veitchii (Rehder & E.H.Wilson) G.Klotz – many-flowered cotoneaster
- Cotoneaster vernae C.K.Schneid.
- Cotoneaster verokotschyi J.Fryer & B.Hylmö
- Cotoneaster verruculosus Diels
- Cotoneaster vestitus (W.W.Sm.) Flinck & B.Hylmö
- Cotoneaster victorianus J.Fryer & B.Hylmö
- Cotoneaster villosulus (Rehder & E.H.Wilson) Flinck & B.Hylmö
- Cotoneaster vilmorinianus G.Klotz – Vilmorin's cotoneaster
- Cotoneaster virgatus G.Klotz
- Cotoneaster vulgaris Hook.f.
- Cotoneaster wallichianus G.Klotz
- Cotoneaster wanbooyensis J.Fryer & B.Hylmö
- Cotoneaster wardii W.W.Sm. – Ward's cotoneaster
- Cotoneaster washanensis J.Fryer & B.Hylmö
- Cotoneaster wattii G.Klotz
- Cotoneaster wilsonii Nakai
- Cotoneaster yakuticus J.Fryer & B.Hylmö
- Cotoneaster yalungensis J.Fryer & B.Hylmö
- Cotoneaster yuii J.Fryer & B.Hylmö
- Cotoneaster yulingkongensis J.Fryer & B.Hylmö
- Cotoneaster yulongensis J.Fryer & B.Hylmö
- Cotoneaster zabelii C.K.Schneid. – cherryred cotoneaster or Zabel's cotoneaster
- Cotoneaster zaprjagaevae Grevtsova
- Cotoneaster zayulensis G.Klotz
- Cotoneaster zeilingskii B.Hylmö
- Cotoneaster zeravschanicus Pojark.
- Cotoneaster zimmermannii J.Fryer & B.Hylmö

== Ecology ==
=== Herbivory ===
Cotoneaster species are used as larval food plants by some Lepidoptera species including grey dagger, mottled umber, short-cloaked moth, winter moth, and hawthorn moth. The flowers attract bees and butterflies and the fruits are eaten by birds. Although Cotoneaster species are a source of nectar. The red berries are also highly attractive to blackbirds and other thrushes. Similar to other small, red berries, all cotoneaster berries are eaten by various bird species, which disperse the seeds widely. They are not suitable for humans to eat; the Children's Hospital of Philadelphia lists Cotoneaster berries as poisonous

=== Invasiveness ===
Many species have escaped from cultivation and become invasive weeds in regions with suitable climatic conditions, such as numerous Chinese species naturalised in north-western Europe. C. glaucophyllus has become an invasive weed in Australia and California. C. simonsii is listed on the New Zealand National Pest Plant Accord preventing its sale and distribution due to its invasive nature. On Portland, Dorset, UK, it has become invasive and is regularly managed to protect the local environment along the Jurassic Coast.

== Uses ==
Cotoneasters are very popular garden shrubs, grown for their attractive habit and decorative fruit. Some cultivars are of known parentage, such as the very popular Cotoneaster × watereri Exell (Waterer's cotoneaster; C. frigidus × C. salicifolius), while others are of mixed or unknown heritage.

The following species and cultivars have gained the Royal Horticultural Society's Award of Garden Merit:-

- Cotoneaster atropurpureus 'Variegatus'
- Cotoneaster conspicuus 'Decorus'
- Cotoneaster 'Cornubia'
- Cotoneaster lacteus
- Cotoneaster procumbens 'Queen of Carpets'
- Cotoneaster 'Rothschildianus'
- Cotoneaster salicifolius 'Gnom'
- Cotoneaster salicifolius 'Pink Champagne'
- Cotoneaster sternianus
- Cotoneaster × suecicus 'Coral Beauty'
- Cotoneaster × suecicus 'Juliette'
