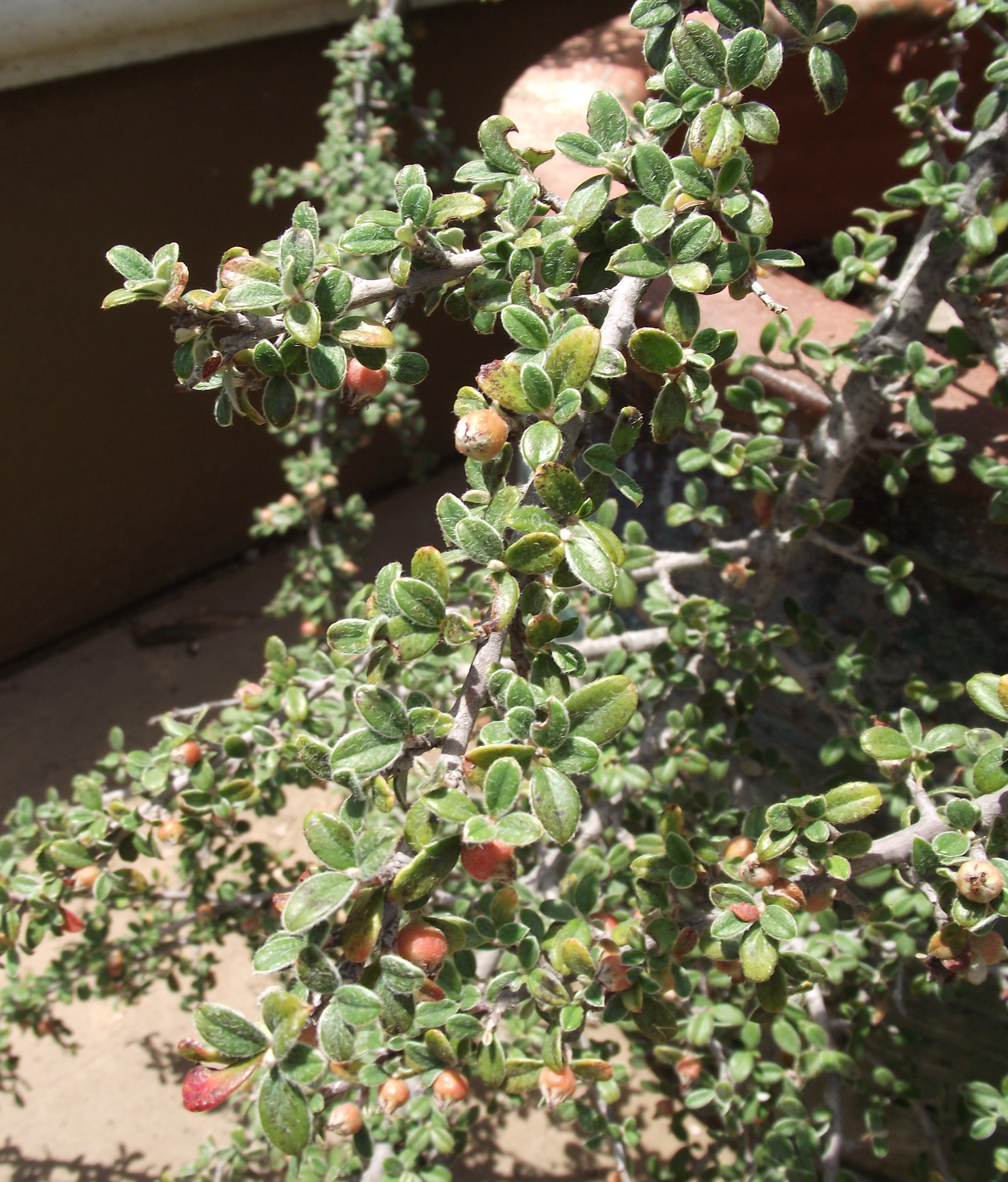

Scientific classification
- Kingdom: Plantae
- Clade: Tracheophytes
- Clade: Angiosperms
- Clade: Eudicots
- Clade: Rosids
- Order: Rosales
- Family: Rosaceae
- Genus: Cotoneaster
- Species: C. glaucophyllus

Binomial name
- Cotoneaster glaucophyllus Franch.

Varieties
- C. g. var. meiophyllus

= Cotoneaster glaucophyllus =

Species of flowering plant

Cotoneaster glaucophyllus, commonly known as glaucous cotoneaster' or bright bead cotoneaster, is a native plant of China and the Himalayas.

Cotoneaster glaucophyllus is a spreading evergreen shrub growing up to 5 metres (16 ft) tall. The oblong leaves are 1.5–4 centimetres (0.59–1.57 in) wide by 3–8 centimetres (1.2–3.1 in) long, with hairy undersides when young. Clumps of red berries are produced after flowering.

In Australia and New Zealand it is considered a weed.

== Description ==
The plant is 4 metres (13 ft) tall with arched and erect branches which are greenish to purple-black in colour. Fertile shoots are 40–70 millimetres (1.6–2.8 in) long including two to four leaves. Its pedicels are 2–6 millimetres (0.079–0.236 in) long and are strigose. The leaves are dull to somewhat shiny and mid-green in colour with light green undersides. Flower buds are white, also the flowers, with a corolla 5–6 millimetres (0.20–0.24 in) wide. Fruits are globose, orange, and 6 millimetres (0.24 in) wide.
