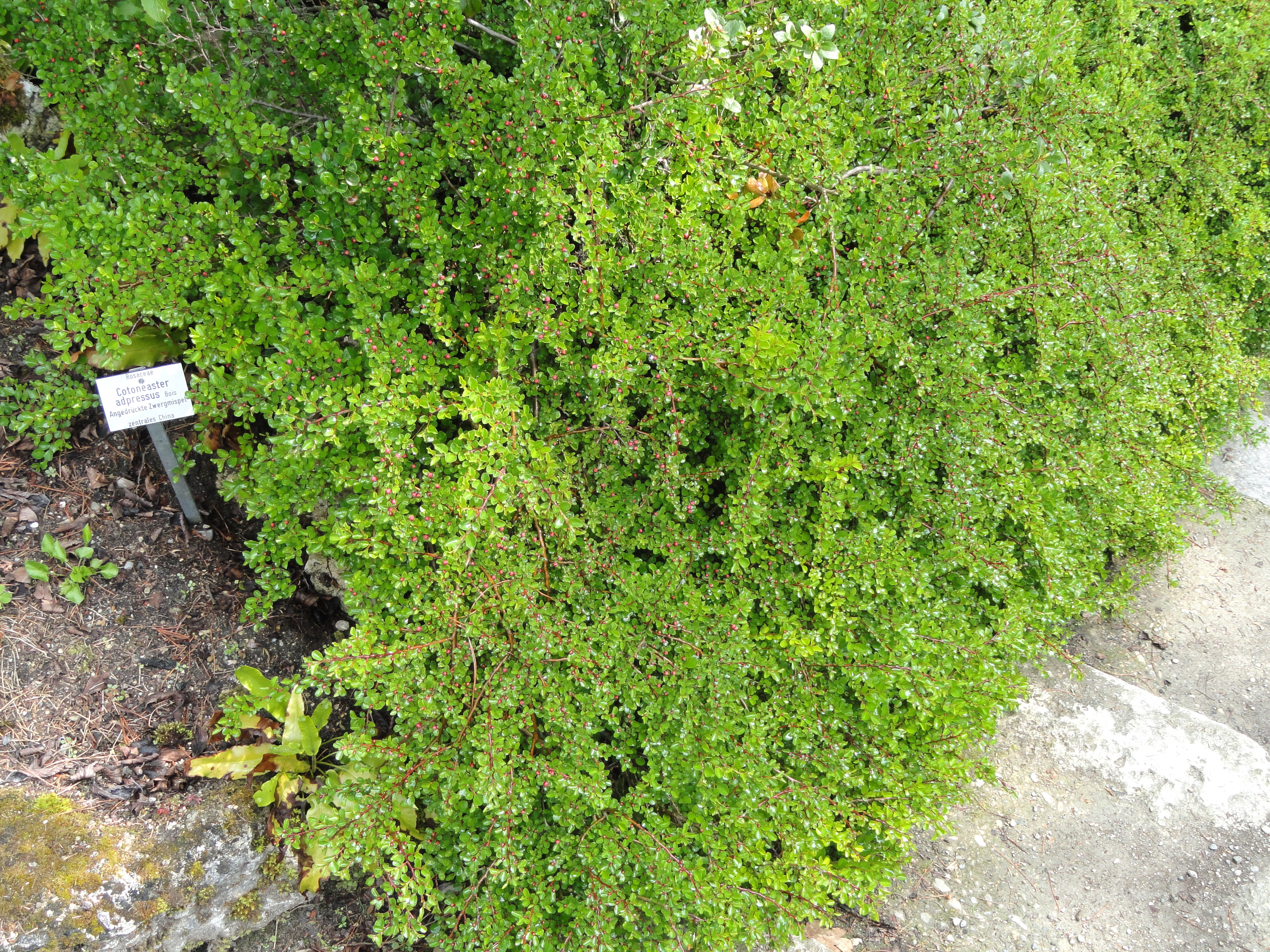
- C. adpressus, Munich Botanical Gardens

Scientific classification
- Kingdom: Plantae
- Clade: Tracheophytes
- Clade: Angiosperms
- Clade: Eudicots
- Clade: Rosids
- Order: Rosales
- Family: Rosaceae
- Genus: Cotoneaster
- Species: C. adpressus

Binomial name
- Cotoneaster adpressus Bois

= Cotoneaster adpressus =

Species of flowering plant

Cotoneaster adpressus, commonly known as creeping cotoneaster, is a species of flowering plant in the genus Cotoneaster of the family Rosaceae, native to western China. A prostrate, dense, deciduous shrub growing to 2 metres (6 ft 7 in) wide, it has masses of tiny rounded leaves, with white flowers followed by bright scarlet berries. Furthermore, it is cultivated as groundcover in gardens in temperate regions.

This plant has gained the Royal Horticultural Society's Award of Garden Merit.
