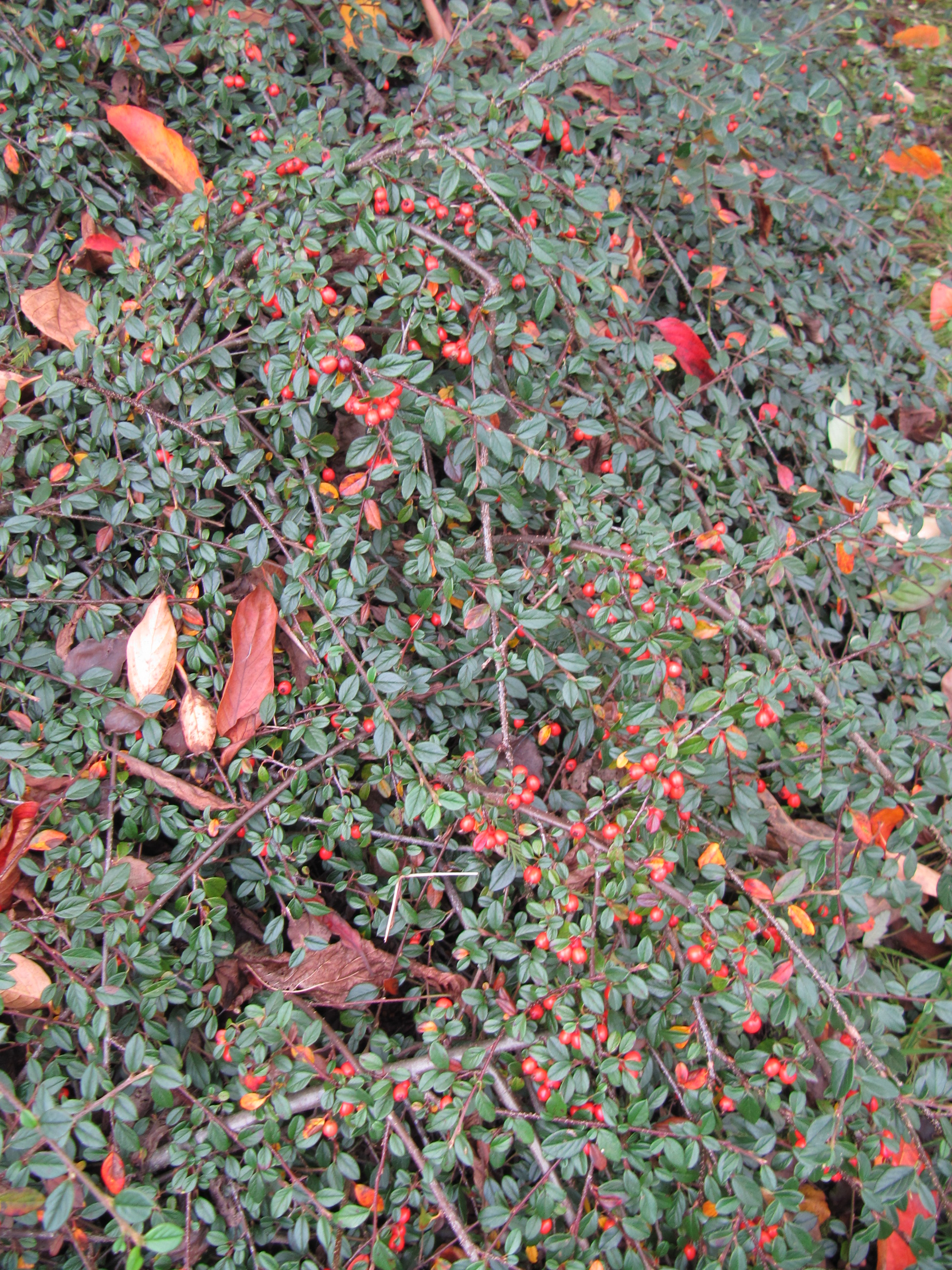

Scientific classification
- Kingdom: Plantae
- Clade: Tracheophytes
- Clade: Angiosperms
- Clade: Eudicots
- Clade: Rosids
- Order: Rosales
- Family: Rosaceae
- Genus: Cotoneaster
- Species: C. kweitschoviensis

Binomial name
- Cotoneaster kweitschoviensis G.Klotz

= Cotoneaster kweitschoviensis =

Species of flowering plant

Cotoneaster kweitschoviensis is a species of flowering plant in the family Rosaceae.

== Description ==
The species is 0.2 metres (7.9 in) tall with its branches being 1.5–2 metres (4 ft 11 in – 6 ft 7 in) in length. It has a pilose and strigose apex with acute sepals which are either acuminate or obtuse the border of which is broad and can be villous and strigose at the same time. Its fertile shoots not to mention 4 leaves are 15–40 millimetres (0.59–1.57 in) in length with pedicels being of 3–6 millimetres (0.12–0.24 in) long. Corolla is 6–9 millimetres (0.24–0.35 in) long and sometimes can have from 3 to 4 petals. The fruits are 5–7 millimetres (0.20–0.28 in) in length and are subglobose, obovoid, red and pilose. It calyx lobes are caudate, erect, and sparsely pilose, while the nutlets are 2–4 millimetres (0.079–0.157 in) with sometimes red apex. The flowers bloom from May to June, while fruits ripe from in November.
