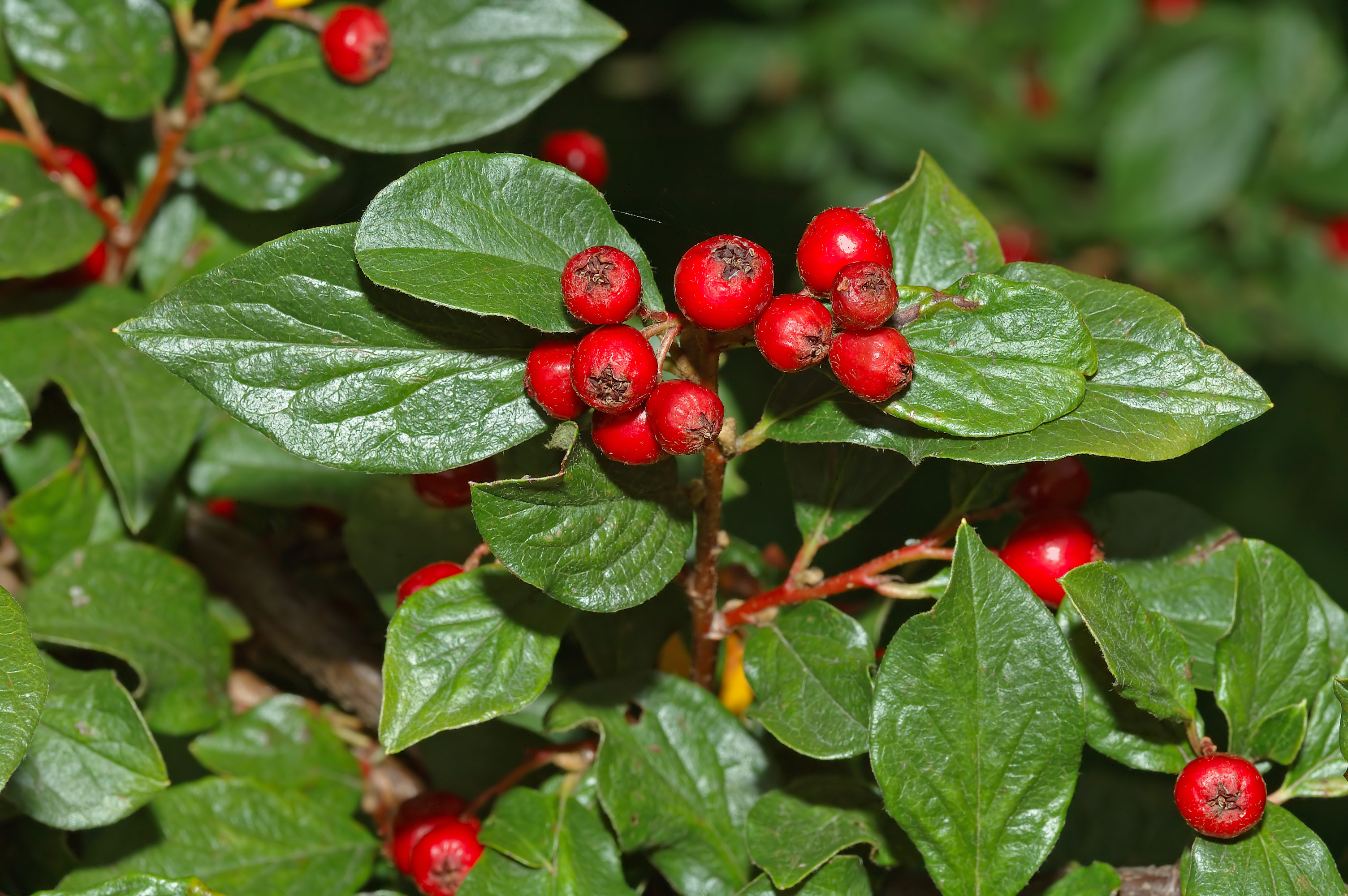
- Cotoneaster acuminatus

Scientific classification
- Kingdom: Plantae
- Clade: Tracheophytes
- Clade: Angiosperms
- Clade: Eudicots
- Clade: Rosids
- Order: Rosales
- Family: Rosaceae
- Genus: Cotoneaster
- Species: C. acuminatus

Binomial name
- Cotoneaster acuminatus Lindl.

= Cotoneaster acuminatus =

Species of flowering plant

Cotoneaster acuminatus, commonly known as acuminate cotoneaster, is a species of flowering plant in the family Rosaceae that is native to the Himalayas. In forests it can be found at elevations of 1,300–3,000 metres (4,300–9,800 ft), while on hillsides it is found at 2,500–3,500 metres (8,200–11,500 ft). The species has also been introduced to Oregon.

== Description ==
Cotoneaster acuminatus is 2 to 4 metres (6 ft 7 in to 13 ft 1 in) in height. Its petioles and lanceolates, both of which are villous, are 3 to 5 millimetres (0.12 to 0.20 in) in length.

== Distribution ==
The species is found in Bhutan, Nepal, China (Sichuan, Xizang, Yunnan), and India (Sikkim).
