= Cotoneaster integrifolius =

- Cotoneaster integrifolius leaves and fruits

Scientific classification
- Kingdom: Plantae
- Clade: Tracheophytes
- Clade: Angiosperms
- Clade: Eudicots
- Clade: Rosids
- Order: Rosales
- Family: Rosaceae
- Genus: Cotoneaster
- Species: C. integrifolius

Binomial name
- Cotoneaster integrifolius (Roxb.) G.Klotz

Species of flowering plant

Cotoneaster integrifolius, the entire-leaved cotoneaster, is a species of Cotoneaster that is a low growing shrub. It has been grown as an ornamental plant in gardens and public rock gardens. It has been introduced to Ireland, but has become naturalised. It produces a red berry-like pome fruit that are an important food source for birds that disperse the seeds in their droppings. They are sometimes grown as a hedge for home security.

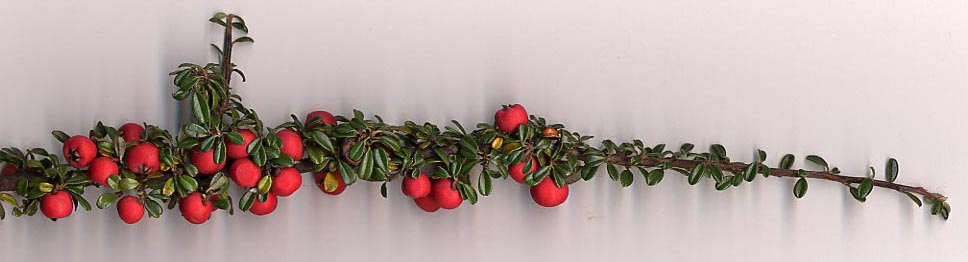
