= Cotoneaster obovatus =

Scientific classification
- Kingdom: Plantae
- Clade: Tracheophytes
- Clade: Angiosperms
- Clade: Eudicots
- Clade: Rosids
- Order: Rosales
- Family: Rosaceae
- Genus: Cotoneaster
- Species: C. obovatus

Binomial name
- Cotoneaster obovatus Wall. ex Dunn

Species of flowering plant

Cotoneaster obovatus is a species of flowering plant in the family Rosaceae that can be found in Kangra and northeastern Punjab provinces of India.

== Description ==
The species is 3 metres (9.8 ft) tall with its fertile shoots being 25–40 millimetres (0.98–1.57 in) long.
