= Cotoneaster insignis =

Scientific classification
- Kingdom: Plantae
- Clade: Tracheophytes
- Clade: Angiosperms
- Clade: Eudicots
- Clade: Rosids
- Order: Rosales
- Family: Rosaceae
- Genus: Cotoneaster
- Species: C. insignis

Binomial name
- Cotoneaster insignis Pojark

Species of flowering plant

Cotoneaster insignis is a species of flowering plant in the family Rosaceae.

== Description ==
The species is 4–5 metres (13–16 ft) while its petioles are 7–11 millimetres (0.28–0.43 in) in length. It pedicels are 2–4 millimetres (0.079–0.157 in) with 2-3 leaves including a lax. The fruit is globose and is 7–9 millimetres (0.28–0.35 in) in length while purple-black in colour. Its calyx lobes are villous with an open navel that have styles which are of 1–2 millimetres (0.039–0.079 in) long.
