= Cotoneaster humilis =

Scientific classification
- Kingdom: Plantae
- Clade: Tracheophytes
- Clade: Angiosperms
- Clade: Eudicots
- Clade: Rosids
- Order: Rosales
- Family: Rosaceae
- Genus: Cotoneaster
- Species: C. humilis

Binomial name
- Cotoneaster humilis Dunn

Synonyms
- Cotoneaster gilgitensis G. Klotz

Species of plant

Cotoneaster humilis is a species of flowering plant in the family Rosaceae. It is native to the northwestern part of the Himalayas, especially Kashmir and Sonamarg districts, where it was found on August 9, 1921.

== Description ==
The plant is 1 metre (3 ft 3 in) tall with villous petioles that are 2 to 5 millimetres (0.079 to 0.197 in) in length. Its fertile shoots are 15 to 30 millimetres (0.59 to 1.18 in) in length, including 2 to 4 leaves and clusters of 1 to 7 flowers. Fruits are 5 to 7 millimetres (0.20 to 0.28 in) in diameter and are red, obovoid and glabrous.
