= Cotoneaster granatensis =

Scientific classification
- Kingdom: Plantae
- Clade: Tracheophytes
- Clade: Angiosperms
- Clade: Eudicots
- Clade: Rosids
- Order: Rosales
- Family: Rosaceae
- Genus: Cotoneaster
- Species: C. granatensis

Binomial name
- Cotoneaster granatensis Boiss.

Synonyms
- Cotoneaster atlanticus G.Klotz; Cotoneaster fontanesii Spach; Pyrus atlantica (G.Klotz) M.F.Fay & Christenh.

Species of plant in the rose family

Cotoneaster granatensis is a species of flowering plant in the family Rosaceae that can be found in Algeria, Morocco, Spain and Tunisia. It was described in 1836.

== Description ==
The species is 3–5 metres (9.8–16.4 ft) with its fertile shoots 20–50 millimetres (0.79–1.97 in) long. Its pedicels are 3–10 millimetres (0.12–0.39 in) long.
