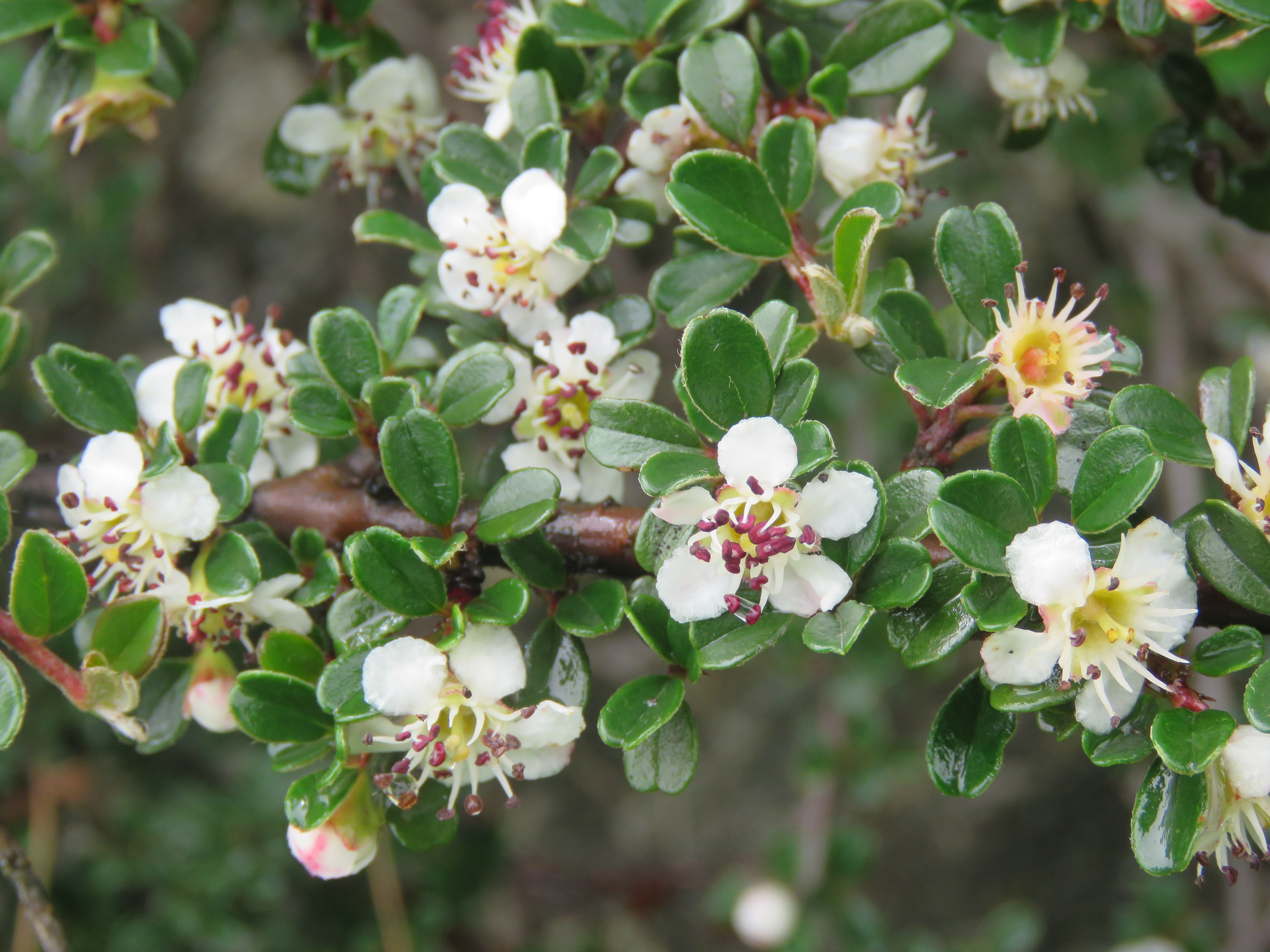
- Flowers and leaves
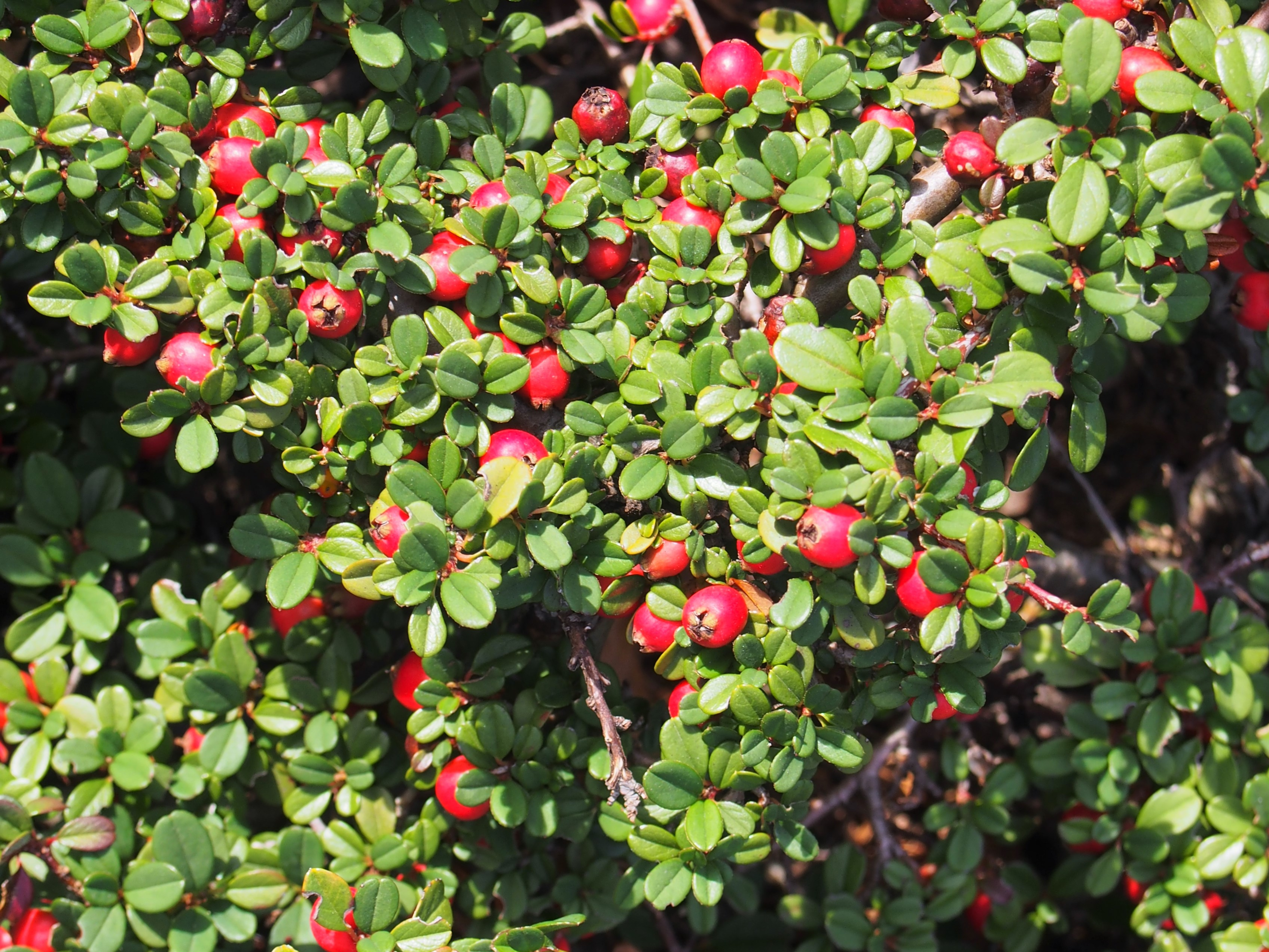
- In fruit

Scientific classification
- Kingdom: Plantae
- Clade: Embryophytes
- Clade: Tracheophytes
- Clade: Spermatophytes
- Clade: Angiosperms
- Clade: Eudicots
- Clade: Rosids
- Order: Rosales
- Family: Rosaceae
- Genus: Cotoneaster
- Species: C. microphyllus

Binomial name
- Cotoneaster microphyllus Wall. ex Lindl.

Synonyms
- List: Cotoneaster astrophoros J.Fryer & E.C.Nelson; Cotoneaster buxifolius var. melanotrichus Franch.; Cotoneaster cashmiriensis G.Klotz; Cotoneaster elatus G.Klotz; Cotoneaster glacialis (Hook.f. ex Wenz.) Panigrahi & Arv.Kumar; Cotoneaster melanotrichus (Franch.) G.Klotz; Cotoneaster microphyllus var. glacialis Hook.f. ex Wenz.; Cotoneaster nivalis (G.Klotz) Panigrahi & Arv.Kumar; Cotoneaster procumbens G.Klotz; Pyrus astrophora (J.Fryer & E.C.Nelson) M.F.Fay & Christenh.; Pyrus cashmiriensis (G.Klotz) M.F.Fay & Christenh.; Pyrus elata (G.Klotz) M.F.Fay & Christenh.; Pyrus glacialis (Hook.f. ex Wenz.) M.F.Fay & Christenh.; Pyrus melanotricha (Franch.) M.F.Fay & Christenh.; Pyrus microphylla (Wall. ex Lindl.) M.F.Fay & Christenh.; Pyrus procumbens (G.Klotz) M.F.Fay & Christenh.

= Cotoneaster microphyllus =

Species of flowering plant

Cotoneaster microphyllus, the small-leaved cotoneaster or rockspray cotoneaster, is a species of flowering plant in the family Rosaceae. It is native to the Indian Subcontinent, Tibet, Sichuan, and Yunnan in China, and Myanmar, and it has been introduced to various locales in Europe, Australia, and the United States. A rabbit-tolerant shrub reaching 1 m (3 ft) tall but spreading to 2.5 m (8 ft), and hardy in USDA zones 5 through 7, it is recommended for rockeries and hedges. Care should be taken not to plant it where it can become invasive.
