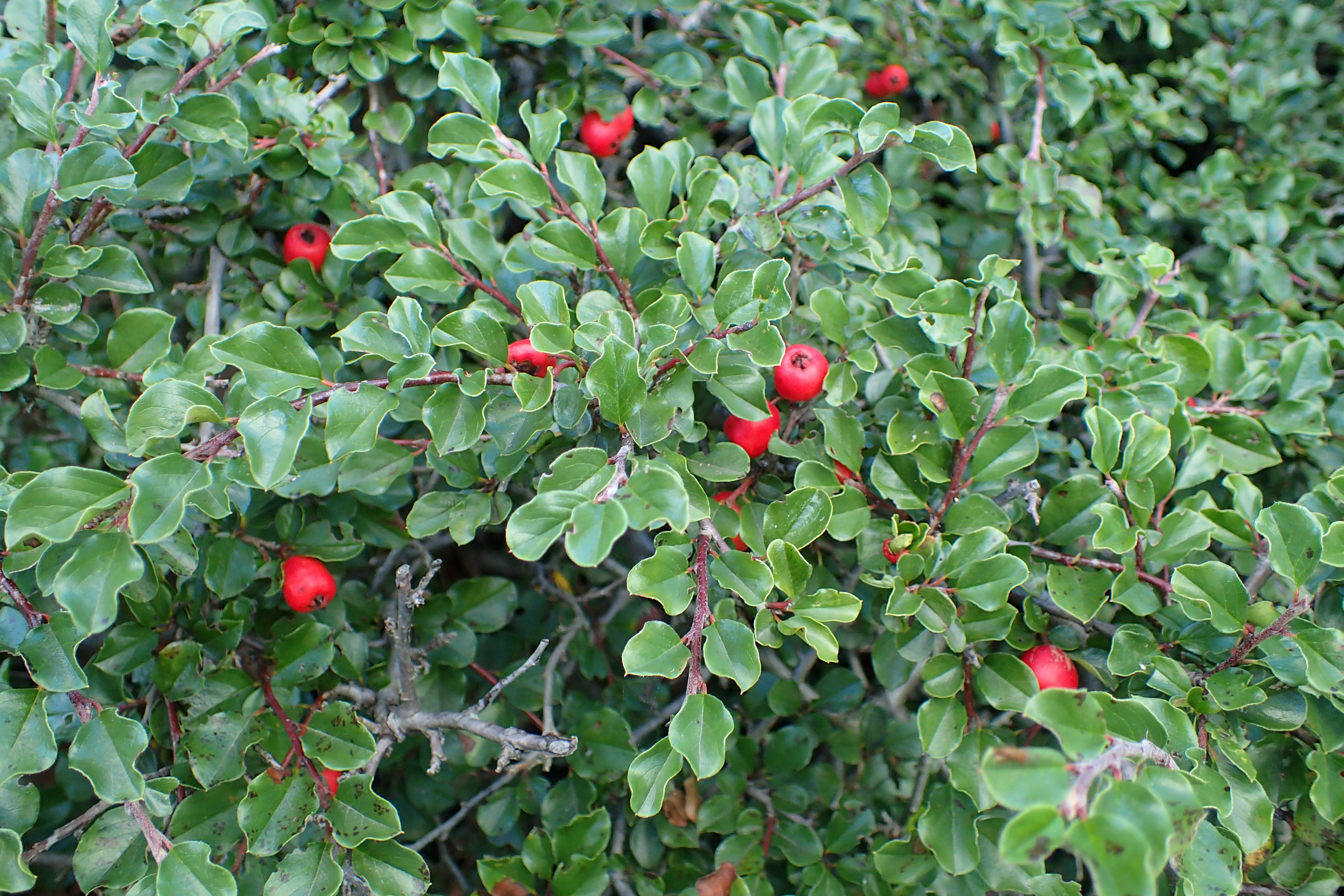
- The showy, persistent fruit remain on the plants into the winter.
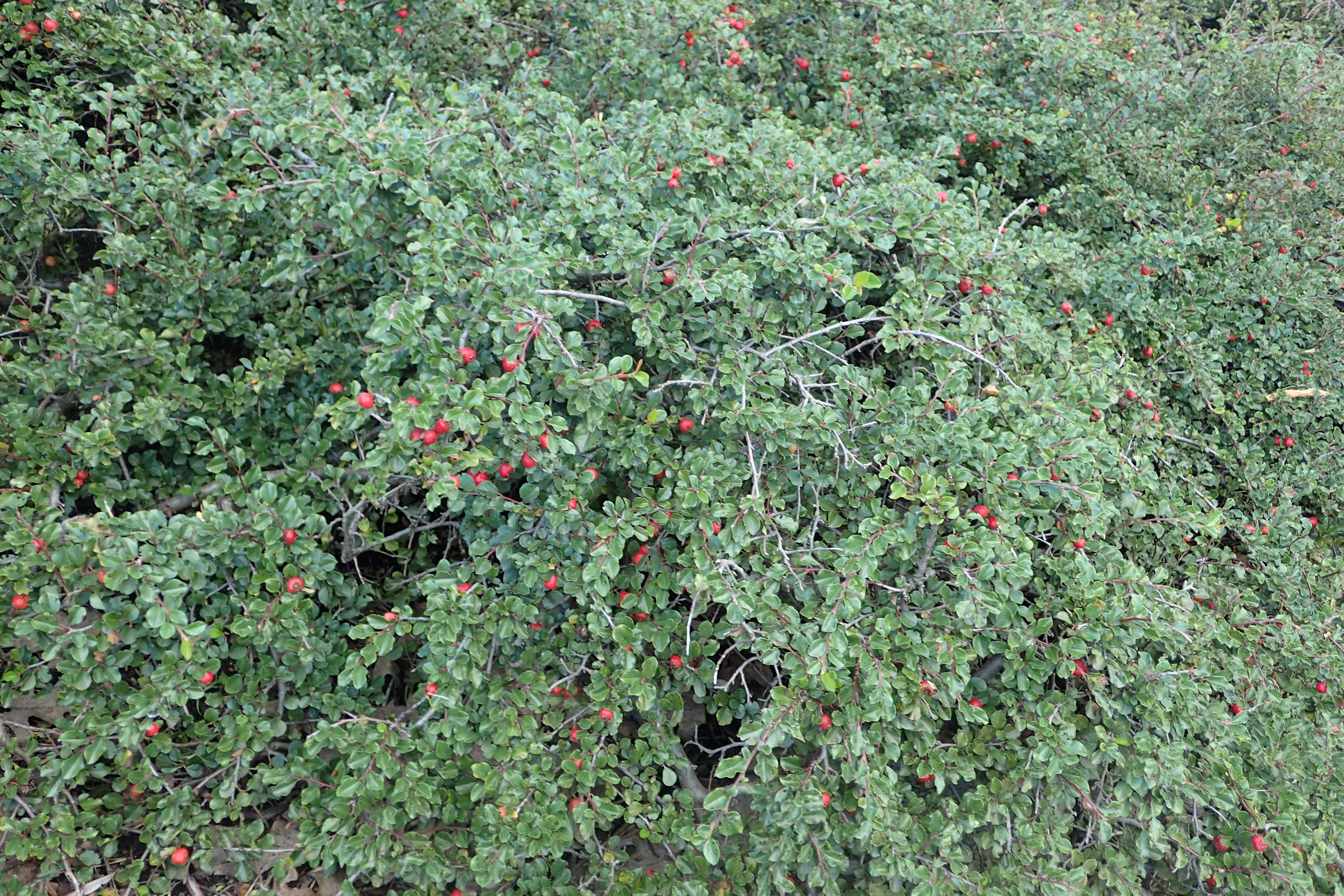
- Habit

Scientific classification
- Kingdom: Plantae
- Clade: Tracheophytes
- Clade: Angiosperms
- Clade: Eudicots
- Clade: Rosids
- Order: Rosales
- Family: Rosaceae
- Genus: Cotoneaster
- Species: C. apiculatus

Binomial name
- Cotoneaster apiculatus Rehder & E.H.Wilson

Synonyms
- Cotoneaster distichus var. tongolensis C.K.Schneid.; Cotoneaster kansuensis G.Klotz; Pyrus apiculata (Rehder & E.H.Wilson) M.F.Fay & Christenh.; Pyrus gansuana M.F.Fay & Christenh.

= Cotoneaster apiculatus =

Species of plant in the rose family

Cotoneaster apiculatus, the cranberry cotoneaster, is a species of flowering plant in the family Rosaceae. It is native to central China, and it has been introduced to various locales in Europe and the United States. A rabbit-tolerant shrub reaching 3 ft (1 m) tall but spreading to 6 ft (2 m), and hardy in USDA zones 4 through 7, it is recommended for covering large areas. It is good on streambanks and slopes where erosion control is desired, as its branches will grow roots where they touch soil.
