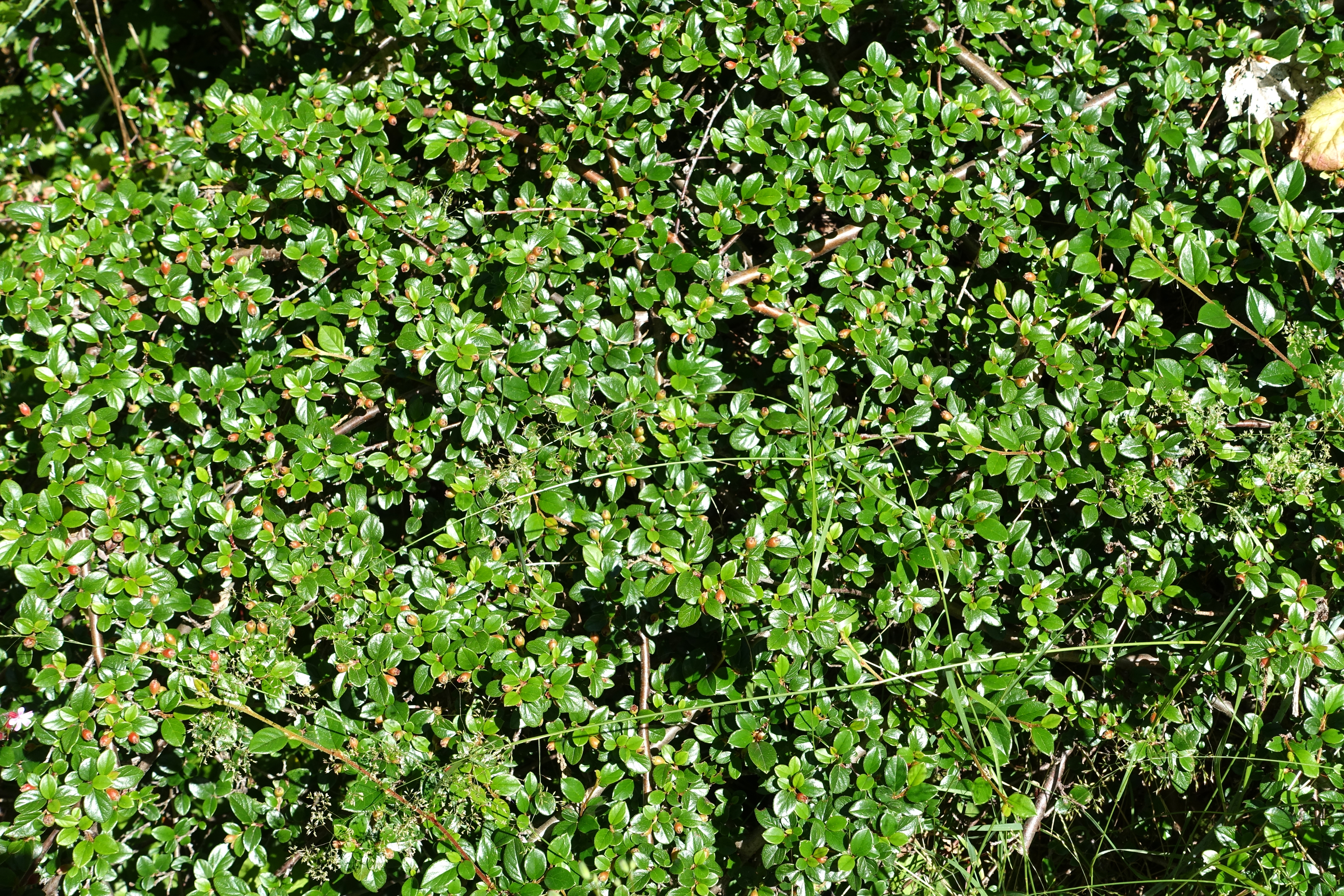
- Cotoneaster nitidus var. parvifolius

Scientific classification
- Kingdom: Plantae
- Clade: Tracheophytes
- Clade: Angiosperms
- Clade: Eudicots
- Clade: Rosids
- Order: Rosales
- Family: Rosaceae
- Genus: Cotoneaster
- Species: C. nitidus

Binomial name
- Cotoneaster nitidus Jacques

= Cotoneaster nitidus =

Species of flowering plant

Cotoneaster nitidus (两列栒子) is a species of deciduous or semi-evergreen shrub in the family Rosaceae endemic to altitudes of 1600–4000 meters in northeastern India, Bhutan, Nepal, Sikkim, and northern Myanmar, as well as the Sichuan, Xizang, and Yunnan provinces in China. It grows to 2.5 m in height, with leaves broadly ovate or broadly obovate, and typically 0.8–1.5 × 0.7–1.3 cm in size.

== Synonyms ==
- None recorded.
