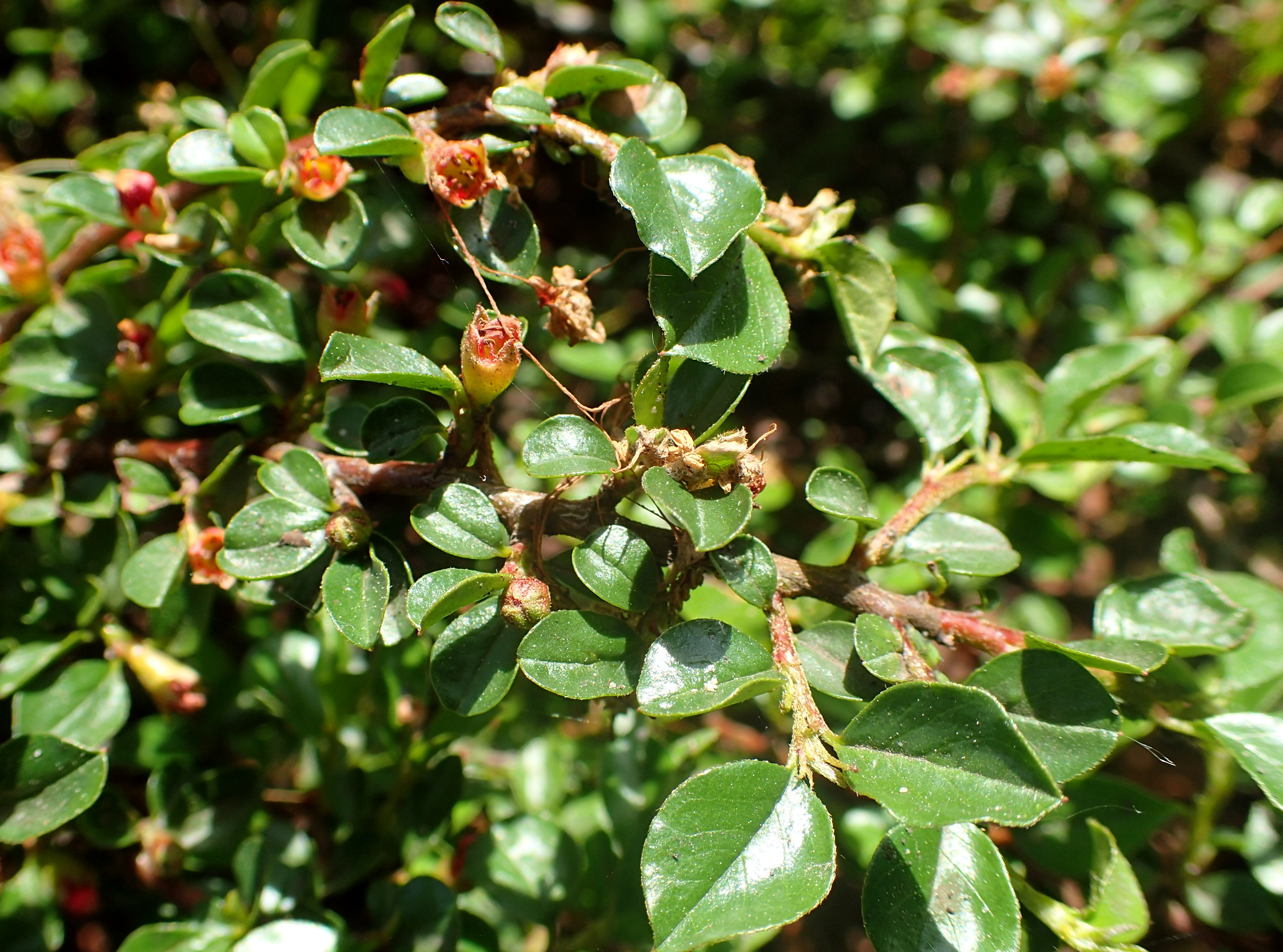
- 'Schneider' cultivar
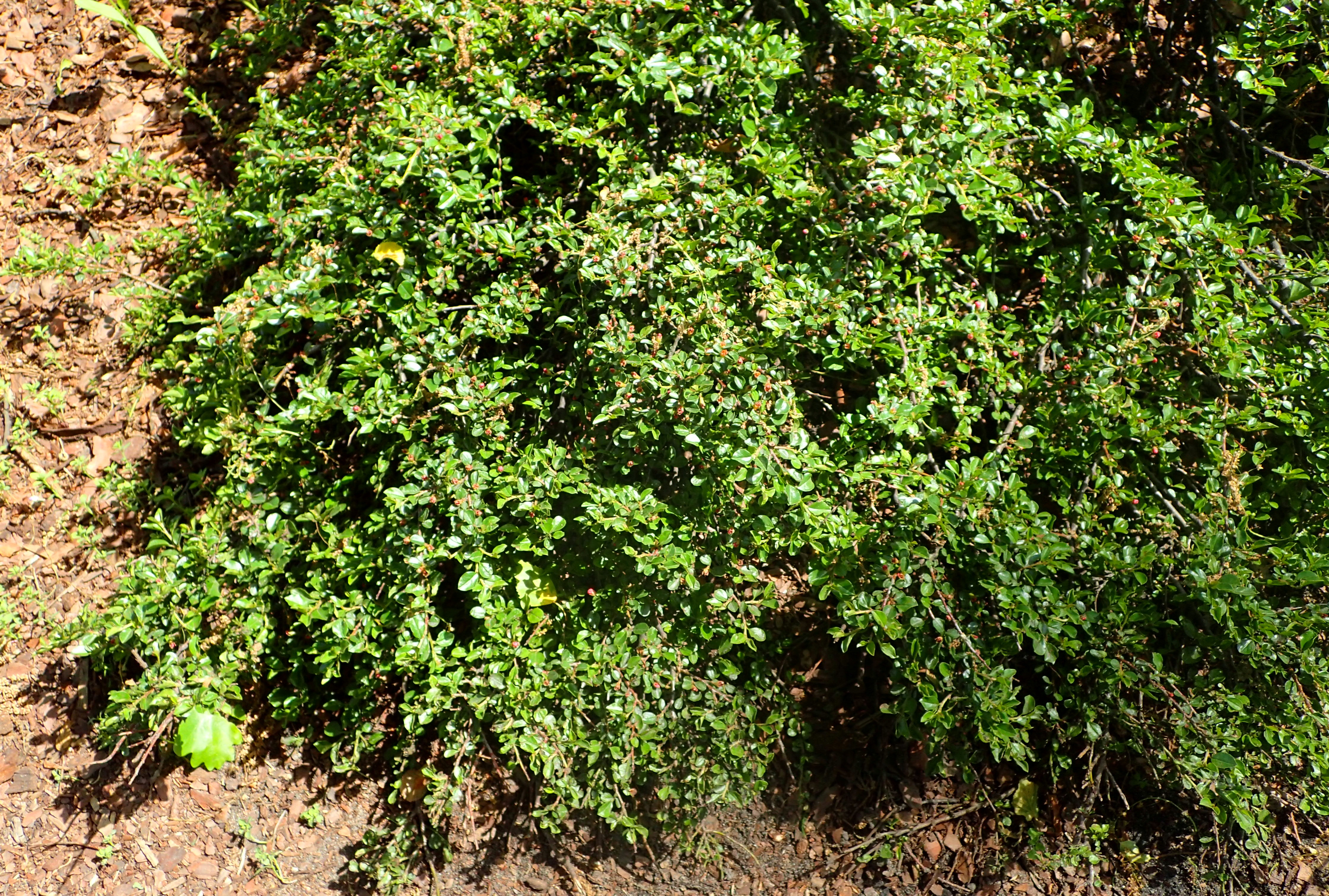
- Habit

Scientific classification
- Kingdom: Plantae
- Clade: Tracheophytes
- Clade: Angiosperms
- Clade: Eudicots
- Clade: Rosids
- Order: Rosales
- Family: Rosaceae
- Genus: Cotoneaster
- Species: C. cochleatus

Binomial name
- Cotoneaster cochleatus (Franch.) G.Klotz

Synonyms
- Cotoneaster buxifolius f. cochleatus Franch.; Pyrus cochleata (Franch.) M.F.Fay & Christenh.

= Cotoneaster cochleatus =

Species of plant in the rose family

Cotoneaster cochleatus, the Yunnan cotoneaster, is a species of flowering plant in the family Rosaceae. It is native to rocky slopes in Tibet, Sichuan, and Yunnan in China, and it has been introduced to the United Kingdom, Belgium and New York State. Its specific epithet cochleatus refers to its twisting stem.

A drought-tolerant creeping shrub reaching 1 ft (0.3 m) tall but spreading to 6 ft (2 m), and hardy in USDA zones 5 through 7, it is considered a valuable landscaping plant by the Missouri Botanical Garden. The Centre for Agriculture and Bioscience International lists it in its Invasive Species Compendium. With its small glossy leaves, tiny rose-like flowers, showy red fruit, and low growth habit, it has found use in bonsai.
