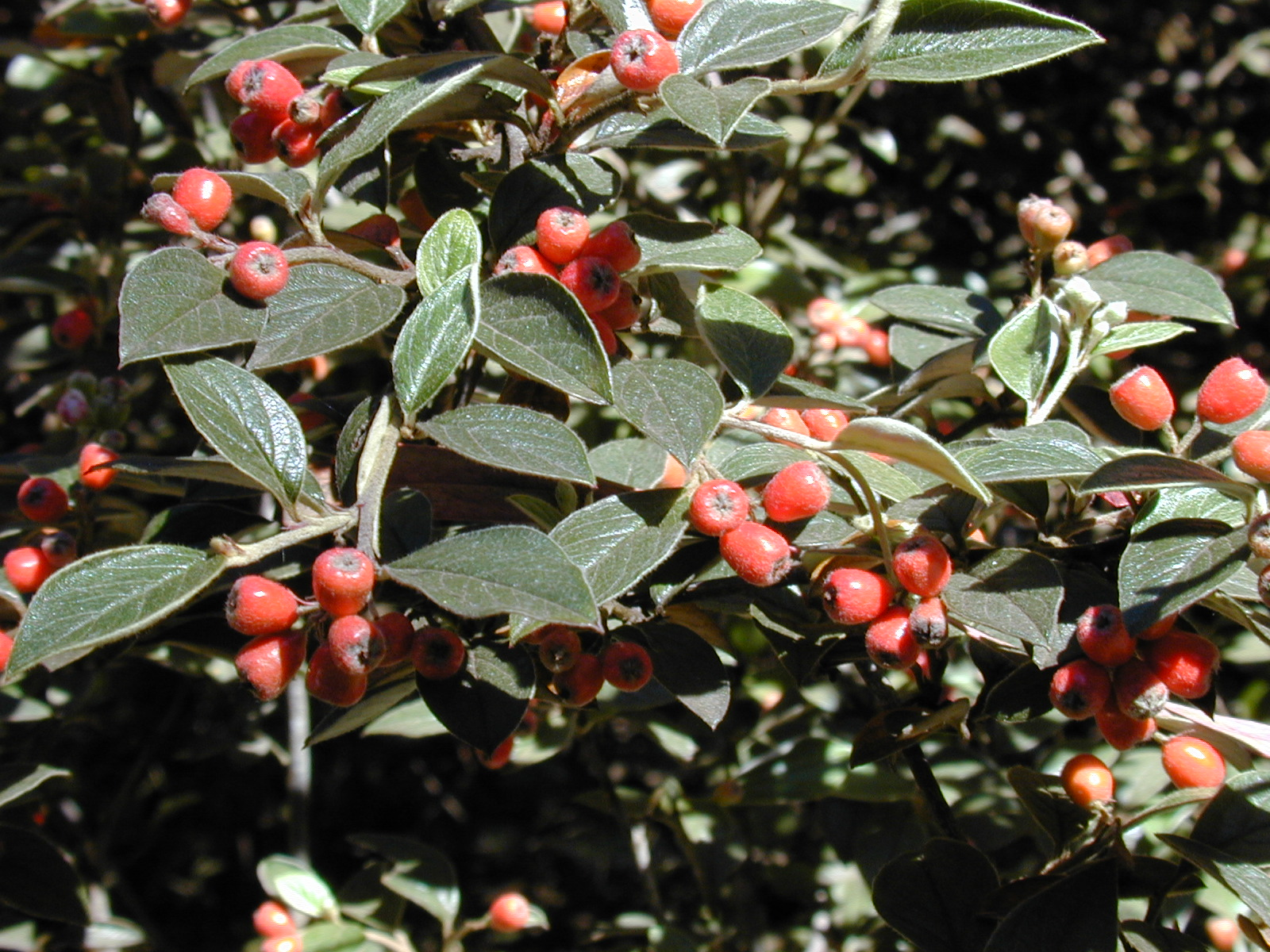

Scientific classification
- Kingdom: Plantae
- Clade: Tracheophytes
- Clade: Angiosperms
- Clade: Eudicots
- Clade: Rosids
- Order: Rosales
- Family: Rosaceae
- Genus: Cotoneaster
- Species: C. pannosus

Binomial name
- Cotoneaster pannosus Franch.

Synonyms
- Cotoneaster pannosa

= Cotoneaster pannosus =

Species of flowering plant

Cotoneaster pannosus is a species of Cotoneaster known by the common name silverleaf cotoneaster. This woody shrub is native to south central China but it has been introduced to other areas of the world, including southern Africa and Australia as an ornamental. It has become naturalized in some areas but it is a troublesome noxious weed in others, for example, in Hawaii. This is a sprawling shrub easily reaching over 3 meters in height. It is covered in dull green oval-shaped leaves with fuzzy white undersides and blooms in white flowers. The fruits are red-orange pomes containing two seeds each. These fruits are very attractive to birds, which are the main agent of seed dispersal. It grows on the elevation of 3,280 feet (1,000 m).

== Invasiveness ==
It is considered to be an invasive species in California and Oregon.
