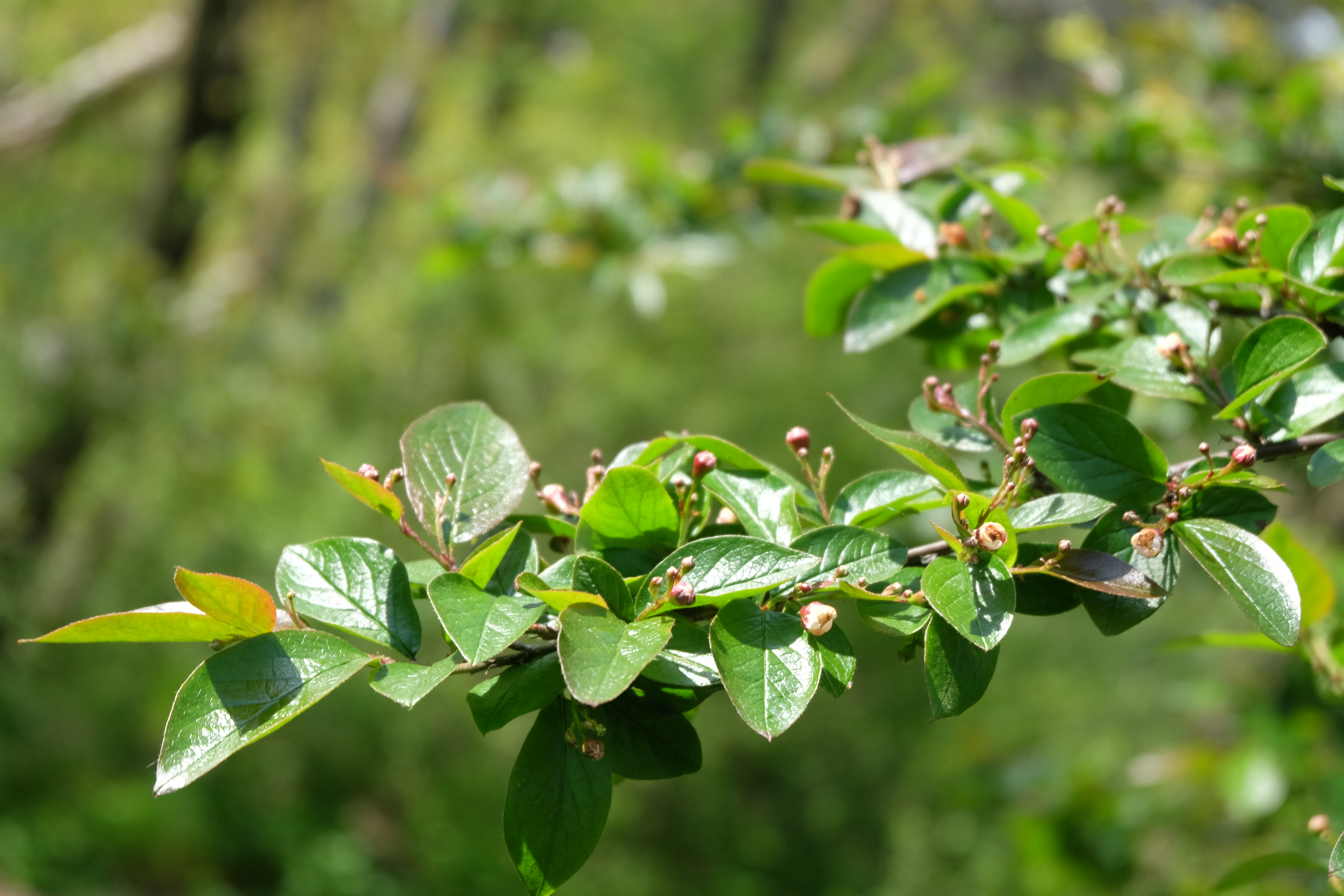
- Peking cotoneaster in flower

Scientific classification
- Kingdom: Plantae
- Clade: Tracheophytes
- Clade: Angiosperms
- Clade: Eudicots
- Clade: Rosids
- Order: Rosales
- Family: Rosaceae
- Genus: Cotoneaster
- Species: C. acutifolius

Binomial name
- Cotoneaster acutifolius Turcz.

Synonyms
- List: Cotoneaster acutifolius var. lucidus (Schltdl.) L.T.Lu; Cotoneaster acutifolius f. pekinensis Koehne; Cotoneaster hurusawaianus G.Klotz; Cotoneaster lucidus Schltdl.; Cotoneaster otto-schwarzii G.Klotz; Cotoneaster pekinensis (Koehne) Zabel; Pyrus acutifolia (Turcz.) M.F.Fay & Christenh.; Pyrus beijingensis M.F.Fay & Christenh.; Pyrus hurusawaiana (G.Klotz) M.F.Fay & Christenh.; Pyrus lucida (Schltdl.) M.F.Fay & Christenh.; Pyrus otto-schwartzii (G.Klotz) M.F.Fay & Christenh.

= Cotoneaster acutifolius =

Species of plant in the rose family

Cotoneaster acutifolius, the Peking cotoneaster, is a species of flowering plant in the family Rosaceae. It is native to southern Siberia, Mongolia, and most of China, and it has been introduced to Canada, the northern United States, and northern Europe. It is a shrub typically 2–4 m (7–13 ft) tall, found in a wide variety of habitats. Some authorities consider Cotoneaster lucidus, the shiny cotoneaster, to be a synonym of Cotoneaster acutifolius.
