= Antonina Pojarkova =

Russian botanist, expert on caucasian flora (1897–1980)

Antonina Ivanovna Pojarkova
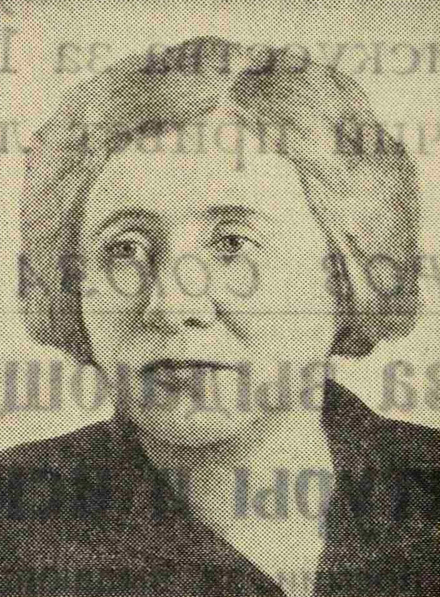
- Born: 1897
- Died: 1980 (aged 82–83)
- Scientific career
- Author abbrev. (botany): Pojark.

Antonina Ivanovna Pojarkova (1897–1980) was a Russian expert on the flora of the Caucasus, with a particular interest in ferns and seed plants. Pojarkova authored 230 land plant species names, the eighth-highest number of such names authored by any female scientist.

== Work ==
Pojarkova was a principal editor with B. N. Gorodkov and author of many components of the 5-volume series Flora of the Murmansk region (Flora Murmanskoj oblasti) which was published by the USSR Academy of Sciences, and with Vladimir Leontyevich Komarov of the 30-volume series Flora SSSR, which was translated into English as Flora of the USSR.

As well as discovering new species, her work is notable for creating infrageneric groups, such as Acer section Trilobata and Crataegus series Orientales.

Her specimen collection has been published for scientific study.

The genus Pojarkovia in the daisy family Asteraceae is named in her honour.
