= Aria croceocarpa =

- Fruiting branch of Aria croceocarpa

Conservation status
- Data Deficient (IUCN 3.1)

Scientific classification
- Kingdom: Plantae
- Clade: Tracheophytes
- Clade: Angiosperms
- Clade: Eudicots
- Clade: Rosids
- Order: Rosales
- Family: Rosaceae
- Genus: Aria
- Species: A. croceocarpa

Binomial name
- Aria croceocarpa (P.D.Sell) Mosyakin, Fedor. & McNeill
- It is naturalised in Great Britain

Synonyms
- List: Karpatiosorbus croceocarpa (P.D.Sell) Sennikov & Kurtto; Pyrus croceocarpa (P.D.Sell) M.F.Fay & Christenh.; Sorbus croceocarpa P.D.Sell; Pyrus aria var. theophrasta A.W.Hill; Sorbus aria var. theophrasta Bean; Sorbus decipiens var. paucicrenata Ridd.; Sorbus theophrasta Lombart

Species of tree in the family Rosaceae

Aria croceocarpa, the Orange whitebeam, is an apomictic species of tree in the family Rosaceae with an unknown origin presumably native to western Europe. It is a neophyte in Britain and Ireland, where it is widely planted in parks, streets, gardens, and woods.

== Description ==
Aria croceocarpa tree

=== Vegetative characteristics ===
Aria croceocarpa is a medium-sized, deciduous, up to 21 m tall tree with a compact, broad, rounded crown. Its branches are ascending or patent. The trunk of up to 1.7 m in circumference bears rough, shallowly fissured, greyish-brown bark. The twigs are thick and greyish-brown. The tomentose, reddish-brown, young shoots bear numerous lenticels. The ovoid, 5–12 mm long, and 4–7 mm wide buds have green scales with narrow, brown margins. The ovate, elliptic, or obovate, sometimes very shallowly lobed, 7.5–15 cm long, and 5.5–12 cm wide leaves with a biserrate margin have 9–11 pairs of lateral veins. The apex is acute, and the base is broadly rounded or broadly cuneate. The glabrous adaxial leaf surface is dark green, and the tomentose abaxial leaf surface is greyish-green. The foliage turns deep yellow in October. The pale green to reddish-brown, tomentose petiole is 1.5–3.5 cm long.

=== Generative characteristics ===
The inflorescence bears 8–85 faintly fragrant flowers. The tomentose pedicel is 5–27 mm long. The triangular-ovate, tomentose sepals with an acute apex are 2–3 mm long. The broadly ovate, concave petals are 6–9 mm long, and 5–6.5 mm wide. The 18–22 stamens with 7–10 mm long, whitish filaments have cream-coloured anthers. The 2 greenish styles are basally fused. The subglobose, 11–22 mm long, and 11–16 mm wide, yellowish-orange, deep orange, or red fruit bears numerous lenticels. It is highly fertile.

=== Cytology ===
The chromosome count is 2n = 4x = 68. It is tetraploid. Aneuploid Aria croceocarpa with 2n = 59 have also been recorded.

== Taxonomy ==
It was first described as Sorbus croceocarpa P.D.Sell by Peter Derek Sell in 1989. It was moved to the genus Aria (Pers.) J.Jacq. ex Host as Aria croceocarpa (P.D.Sell) Mosyakin, Fedor. & McNeill by Sergei Leonidovich Mosyakin, Mykola Mykhaylovych Fedoronchuk, and John McNeill in 2025. It is the result of hybridisation between Aria torminalis and the Aria edulis group. It has the Aria torminalis plastid DNA haplotype. It has been confused with Aria devoniensis.

=== Etymology ===
The specific epithet croceocarpa is derived from croceo meaning yellow, golden, or saffron-coloured, and carpa meaning fruit.

== Distribution and habitat ==
Aria croceocarpa is presumably native to western Europe, but it is only known as a cultivated or naturalised plant. It is widely naturalised in Great Britain, but is rarely seen in Ireland. It grows in lowland scrub and open woodland on base-rich soils. Aria croceocarpa has been cultivated in Britain since 1874, and naturalised trees were seen in the wild by 1883.

== Ecology ==
Aria croceocarpa is a host plant for the moth Phyllonorycter sorbi

It is a host plant for the moth Phyllonorycter sorbi. The fruits are eaten by birds and birds disperse the seeds.

== Conservation ==
Aria croceocarpa is a data deficient species of unknown origin. The native distribution has yet to be found. It is cultivated in numerous ex situ conservation collections in botanic gardens.

== Uses ==
In the United Kingdom, it is a widely cultivated tree.
