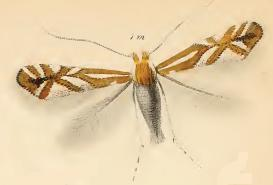

Scientific classification
- Kingdom: Animalia
- Phylum: Arthropoda
- Class: Insecta
- Order: Lepidoptera
- Family: Gracillariidae
- Genus: Phyllonorycter
- Species: P. mespilella

Binomial name
- Phyllonorycter mespilella (Hubner, 1805)

Synonyms
- Tinea mespilella Hubner, 1805; Lithocolletis pyrivorella Bankes, 1899

= Phyllonorycter mespilella =

Species of moth

Phyllonorycter mespilella is a moth of the family Gracillariidae. It is found from Germany to the Iberian Peninsula, Sardinia, Italy and the Carpathian Mountains and from Ireland to southern Russia. It also occurs over much of western North America, from California north to British Columbia, and east to Utah and New Mexico.

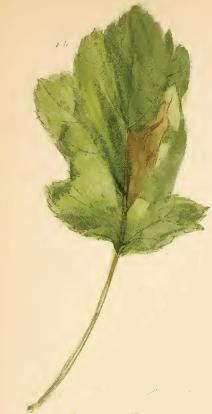
Mined leaf of Sorbus torminalis

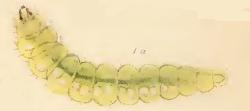
Larva

The wingspan is 6–8 mm. The forewing ground is golden or darker brown with a basal streak.There are four small costal and three dorsal marks (the first two dorsal large the third very small) that are white edged with black on the basal edges. Phyllonorycter oxyacanthae, Phyllonorycter sorbi and P. mespilella cannot be reliably separated without genitalia dissection.

Adults are on wing in May and again in August.

The larvae feed on Amelanchier ovalis, Cotoneaster integerrimus, Crataegus, Cydonia oblonga, Malus domestica, Mespilus germanica, Prunus cerasus, Pyrus communis, Sorbus aria, Sorbus aucuparia, Sorbus intermedia and Sorbus torminalis. They mine the leaves of their host plant.
