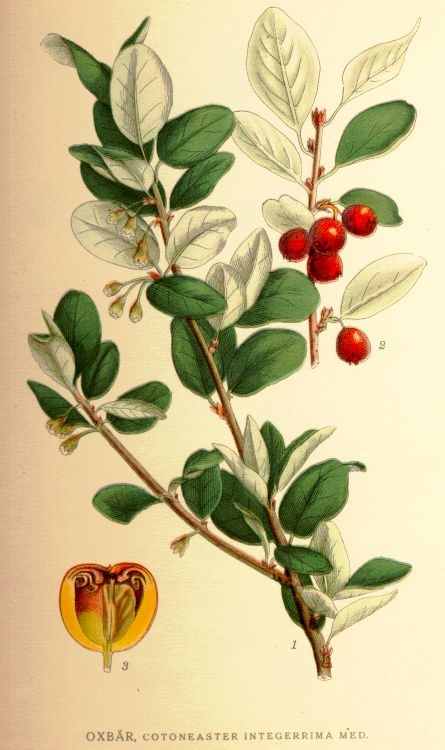
- 1917 painting from Sweden

Scientific classification
- Kingdom: Plantae
- Clade: Tracheophytes
- Clade: Angiosperms
- Clade: Eudicots
- Clade: Rosids
- Order: Rosales
- Family: Rosaceae
- Genus: Cotoneaster
- Species: C. scandinavicus

Binomial name
- Cotoneaster scandinavicus B.Hylmö

= Cotoneaster scandinavicus =

Species of flowering plant

Cotoneaster scandinavicus, commonly known as Scandinavian cotoneaster, is a species of Cotoneaster native to Scandinavia, in Norway, Sweden and Finland south of the Arctic Circle, the Danish island of Bornholm, and also the Baltic States of Estonia and Latvia.

It is a recently described species, closely related to (and formerly considered conspecific with) Cotoneaster integerrimus from central and eastern Europe and southwest Asia, and is also related to Cotoneaster cambricus from Wales. It differs from C. integerrimus in that the leaves are always glabrous above, and the 5 mm diameter fruit are light orange-red, not dark red. It grows up to 2 m (7 ft) tall (though usually much less), and occurs primarily on thin soils over chalk and limestone.
