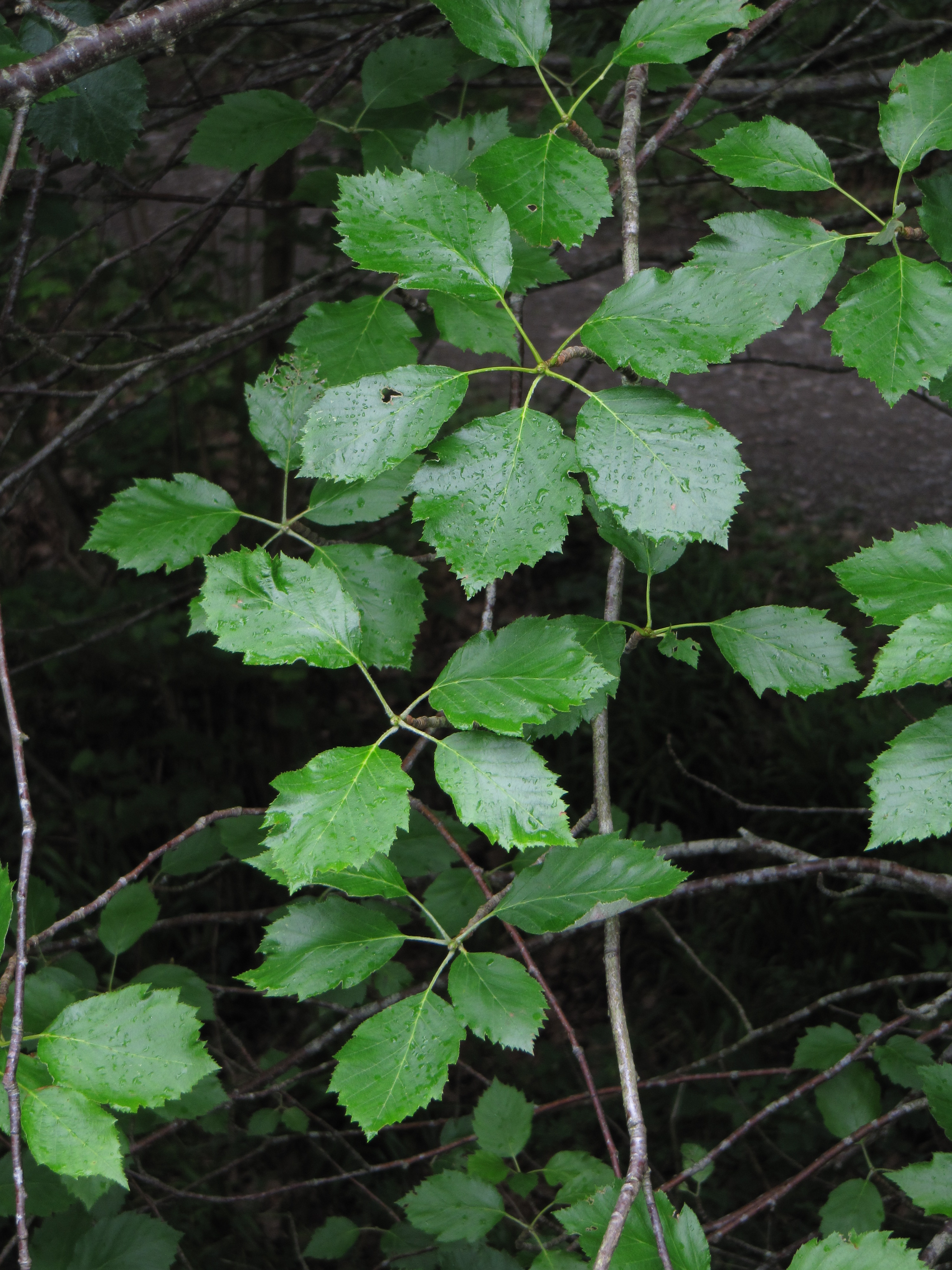
- In Watersmeet, Lynton

Conservation status
- Endangered (IUCN 3.1)

Scientific classification
- Kingdom: Plantae
- Clade: Tracheophytes
- Clade: Angiosperms
- Clade: Eudicots
- Clade: Rosids
- Order: Rosales
- Family: Rosaceae
- Genus: Aria
- Species: A. admonitor

Binomial name
- Aria admonitor (M.Proctor) Mosyakin, Fedor. & McNeill
- It is endemic to Great Britain (North Devon)

Synonyms
- Pyrus admonitor (M.Proctor) M.F.Fay & Christenh.; Sorbus admonitor M.Proctor; Karpatiosorbus admonitor (M.Proctor) Sennikov & Kurtto

= Aria admonitor =

Species of tree

Coordinates: 51°13′33″N 3°47′59″W

Aria admonitor, the Watersmeet whitebeam, is an apomictic species of tree in the family Rosaceae endemic to Devon, United Kingdom. It is known only from the Watersmeet Valley at Lynton, with two stray plants growing on the coast above Sillery Sands, Countisbury.

== Description ==
Aria admonitor growing in Watersmeet, Devon, United Kingdom

Aria admonitor is an up to 16 m tall tree with ovate to obovate, glossy, deeply lobed leaves.

=== Cytology ===
A chromosome count showed that the species is tetraploid.

== Taxonomy ==
Although first recognised as a distinct variety in the 1930s (by the botanist E. F. Warburg) because of its strongly lobed leaves, it was only accorded species status in 2009, after various biochemical analyses. It is believed at least 110 individuals of the species exist and represent a stable population. The leaves of the Watersmeet whitebeam have more accentuated lobes than the Devon whitebeam, of which it was thought before to be a variety.

The research project that named the tree as a species was led by Dr. Tim Rich, head of vascular plants at the National Museum Wales, as well as academics from Bristol University, Exeter University, Oxford University and the Royal Botanic Gardens, Kew. The announcement of the species, and of thirteen other Sorbus species, was made in two papers in the BSBI's journal Watsonia.

Dr Rich stated that the trees, along with other new whitebeam species, had "probably developed recently", and also considered them as "examples of on-going evolution of new species".

The holotype is a large tree above scree at Watersmeet in Vice-county 4, North Devon, Grid Ref SS744490; the material studied was collected on 10 October 2007. It is a member of the Aria latifolia group.

It is similar to Aria devoniensis, but differing in having leaves more deeply lobed, 10–23% of the way to the midrib at the centre of the lamina – not 6–18% as in Aria devoniensis; the leaves of Aria admonitor are also glossier than those of Aria devoniensis.

=== Etymology ===
The first tree to be found (not the type specimen) beside a lay-by near Watersmeet in North Devon, had a "no parking" sign nailed to the tree. The specific name, admonitor, is a Latin word referring to something that admonishes, a reference to the "no parking" sign.

== Distribution and habitat ==
It is endemic to the Watersmeet area, where there are at least 108 trees in the East Lyn Valley and two trees nearby above Sillery Sands, Lynmouth. Aria devoniensis does not grow in this area. The two species have not been confirmed as growing together.

== Conservation ==
As a result of its small range, which is largely confined to North Devon, it has an IUCN conservation assessment of Endangered. However, its population trend is stable, and ex-situ conservation measures are in place. In addition, the majority of Aria admonitor's range exists in protected areas.
