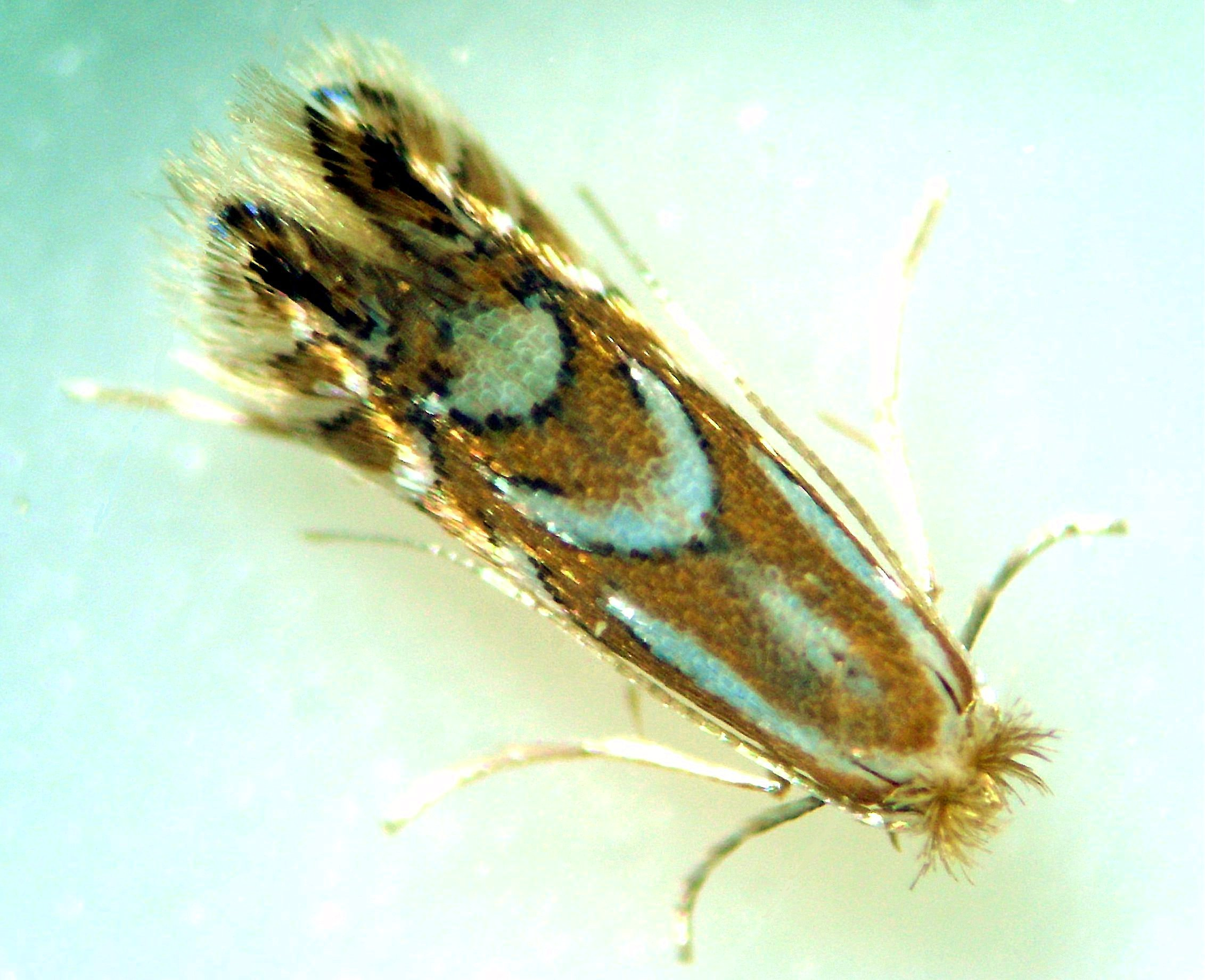

Scientific classification
- Kingdom: Animalia
- Phylum: Arthropoda
- Class: Insecta
- Order: Lepidoptera
- Family: Gracillariidae
- Genus: Phyllonorycter
- Species: P. sorbi

Binomial name
- Phyllonorycter sorbi (Frey, 1855)

Synonyms
- Lithocolletis sorbi Frey, 1855

= Phyllonorycter sorbi =

Species of moth

Phyllonorycter sorbi is a moth of the family Gracillariidae. It is known from all of Europe, except the Balkan Peninsula.

They have a wingspan of 7–9 mm and body length of 7–8.5 mm. The forewing has four costal and three dorsal white stripes, the inner part has a dark brown border. There is a narrow band at the base of the wing. The pupa is 2.5–3.5 mm long, the cremaster is trapezoidal. P. sorbi, P. oxyacanthae and P. mespilella cannot be reliably separated without genitalia dissection.

There are two generations per year with adults on wing in April and May and again in August.

The larvae feed on Cotoneaster integerrimus, Crataegus, Cydonia, Malus sylvestris, Prunus avium, Prunus padus, Pyrus communis, Sorbus aria, Sorbus aucuparia, Sorbus chamaemespilus, Sorbus domestica, Sorbus intermedia and Sorbus torminalis. They mine the leaves of their host plant.
