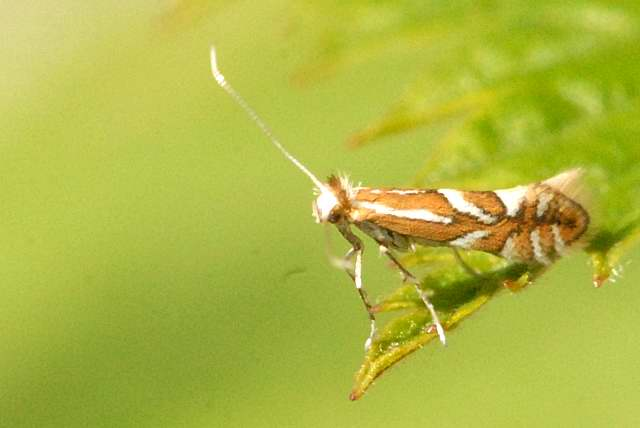

Scientific classification
- Kingdom: Animalia
- Phylum: Arthropoda
- Class: Insecta
- Order: Lepidoptera
- Family: Gracillariidae
- Genus: Phyllonorycter
- Species: P. oxyacanthae

Binomial name
- Phyllonorycter oxyacanthae (Frey, 1856)

Synonyms
- Lithocolletis oxyacanthae Frey, 1856; Phyllonorycter pomonella (Zeller, 1846)

= Phyllonorycter oxyacanthae =

Species of moth

Phyllonorycter oxyacanthae is a moth of the family Gracillariidae found in all of Europe except the Balkan Peninsula. It was described by the German-born Swiss entomologist, Heinrich Frey in 1856. The larvae are known as leaf miners, living inside the leaves of their food plants.

== Description ==
The wingspan is 6–8 mm. The posterior tarsi with dark fuscous spots. Forewings are golden-brown to dark brown; a white median streak from base to near middle, dark margined above; dorsum narrowly white towards base; four costal and three dorsal white wedge-shaped spots, anteriorly blackish-margined, first costal small, first dorsal long, sometimes interrupted; a blackish apical spot. Hindwings are dark grey.

Similar species

Phyllonorycter sorbi and Phyllonorycter mespilella are close relatives and require genitalia examination to tell apart, alternatively collect the pupa from the food plants.

Ovum

Eggs are laid on the underside of a leaf.

Larvae

Larvae can be found in two generations; July and September to October and are greenish-yellow with a pale brown head. The mine is on the underside of a leaf, usually near an edge or lobe. There are many creases in the epidermis, which strongly contracts, causing the leaf-edge or lobe to fold over. The epidermis remains green, unlike the mines of Parornix anglicella which is smaller and the epidermis is brown. Larvae have been found feeding on Crataegomespilus arnieresi, fireberry hawthorn (Crataegus chrysocarpa), hawthorn (Crataegus monogyna), small-flowered black hawthorn (Crataegus pentagyna), Crataegus rhipidophylla river hawthorn (Crataegus rivularis), quince (Cydonia oblonga), medlar (Mespilus germanica), scarlet firethorn (Pyracantha coccinea), common pear (Pyrus communis), rowan (Sorbus aucuparia) and Sorbus torminalis.

Pupa

Pupae are found in July and from October to May. The winter generation is in a flimsy golden-brown cocoon, while the summer generation is almost without a cocoon and the frass is behind a silken pad at the end of the lobe.

The moth is bivoltine, i.e. two generations in May and August.

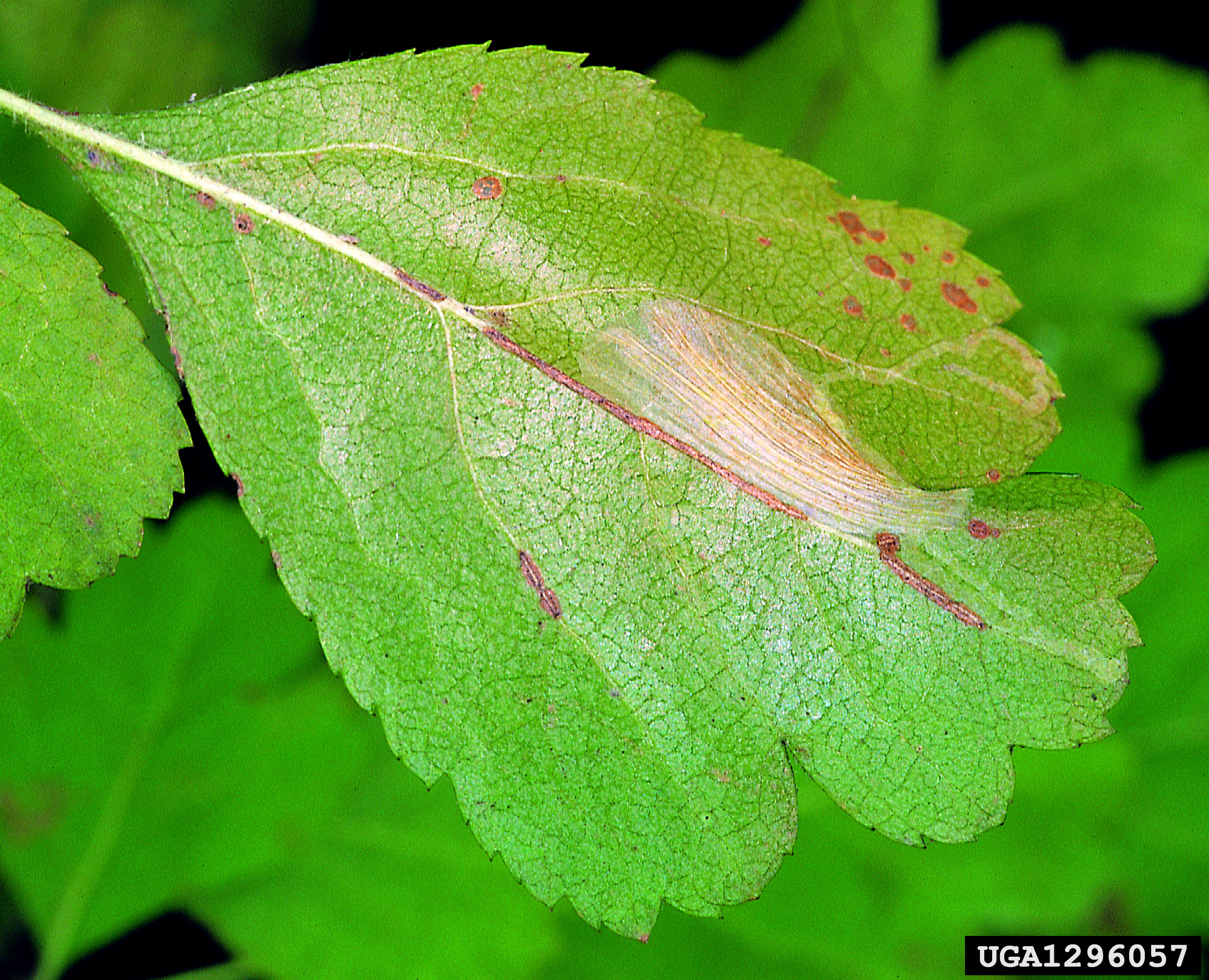
Leaf mine

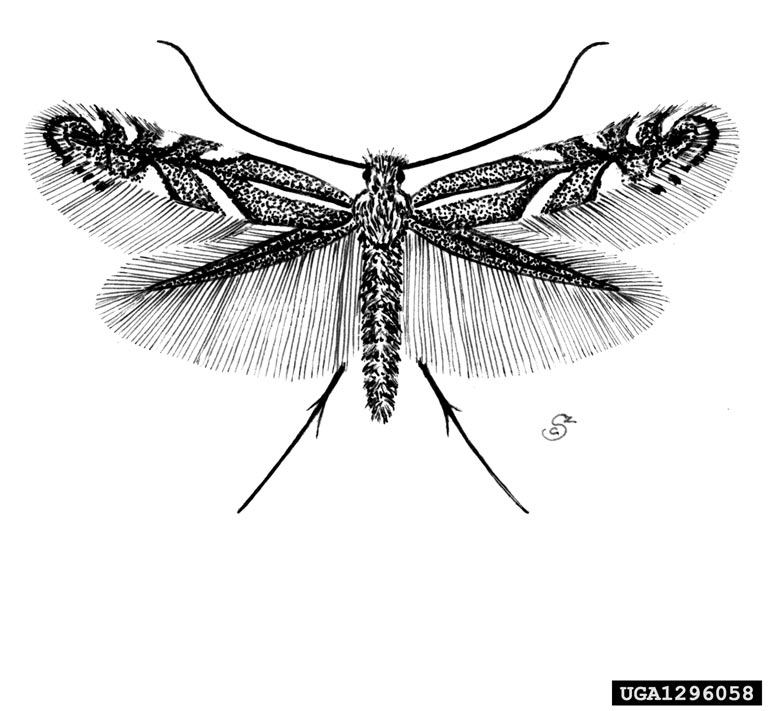

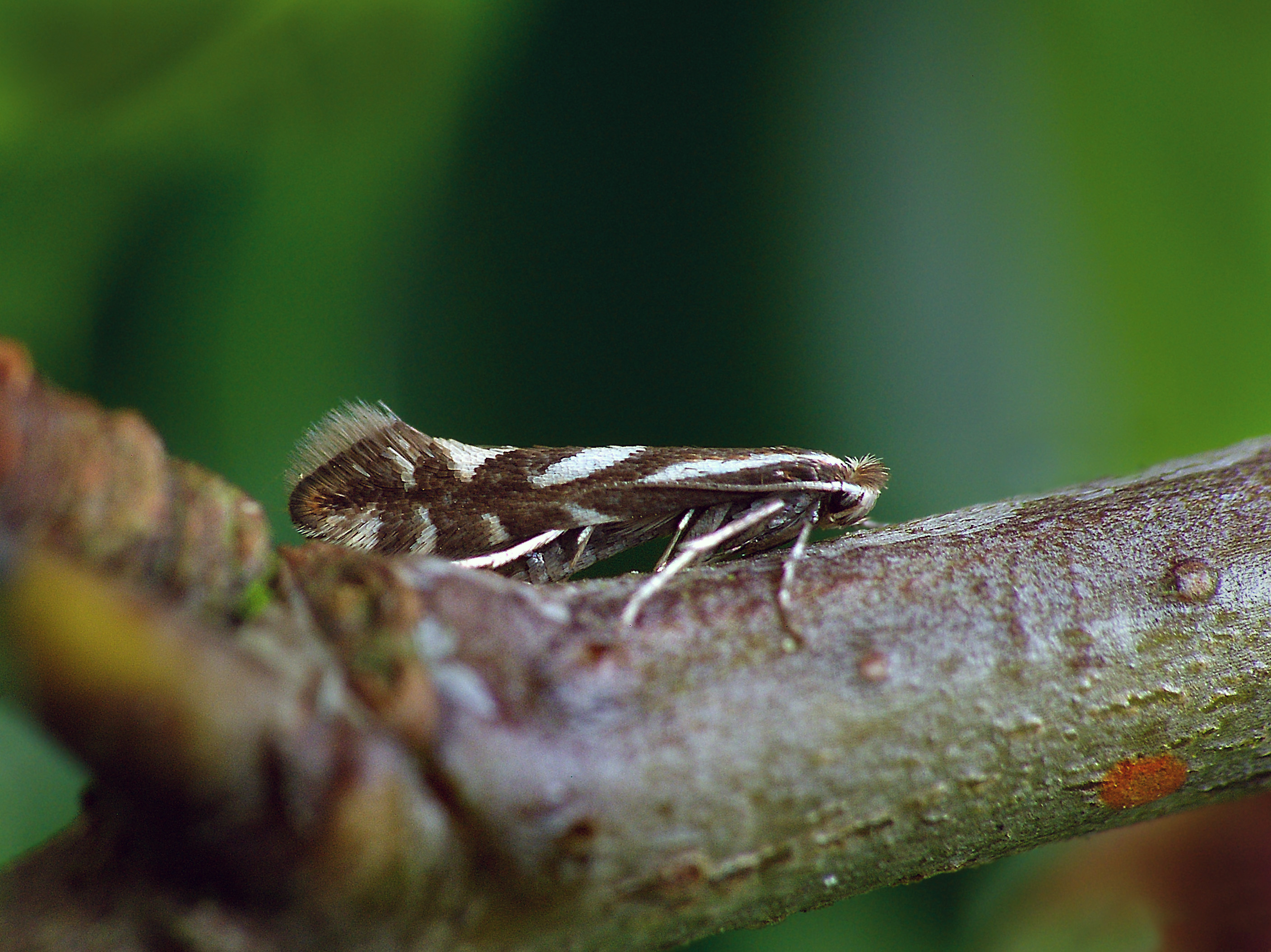

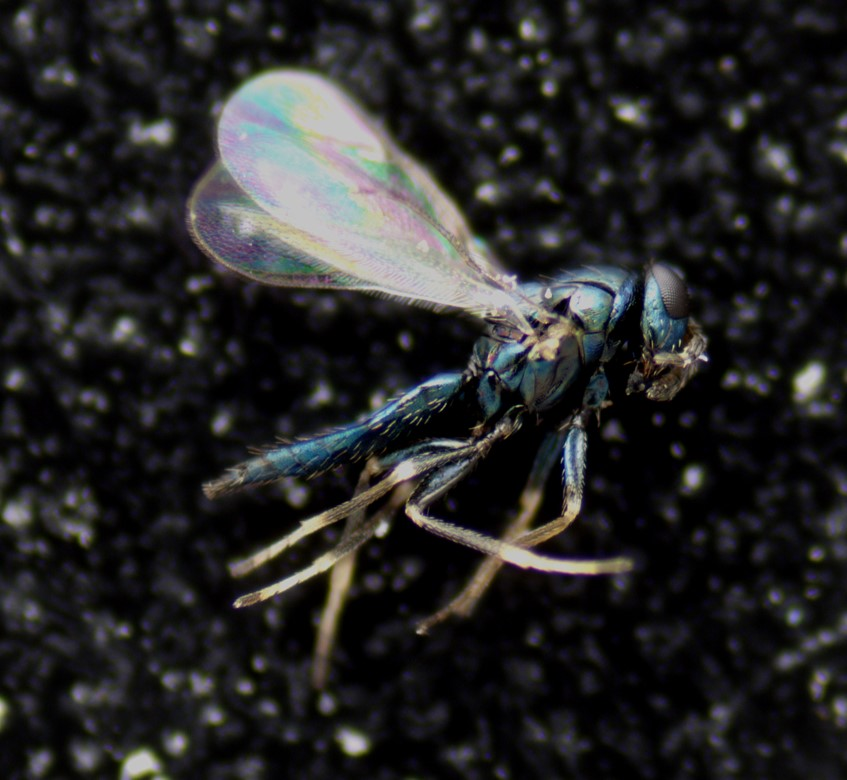
Sympiesis sericeicornis – a parasitoid

== Parasitoids ==
Three parasitoids are known,

- Achrysocharoides atys
- Sympiesis gordius
- Sympiesis sericeicornis.

== Taxonomy ==
Frey originally called the moth Lithocolletis oxyacantha, from a specimen found in Zurich, Switzerland in 1856. The genus Lithocolletis was raised by Jacob Hübner in 1825 and refers to mosaic work, that is, ″the attractive variegated pattern of the forewings″. The moth was later moved to the genus Phyllonorycter which is Greek for leaf and a digger, referring to a leaf-mine or leaf-miner. The specific name is named after one of the food-plants midland hawthorn (Crataegus oxyacantha) now known as Crataegus laevigata.
