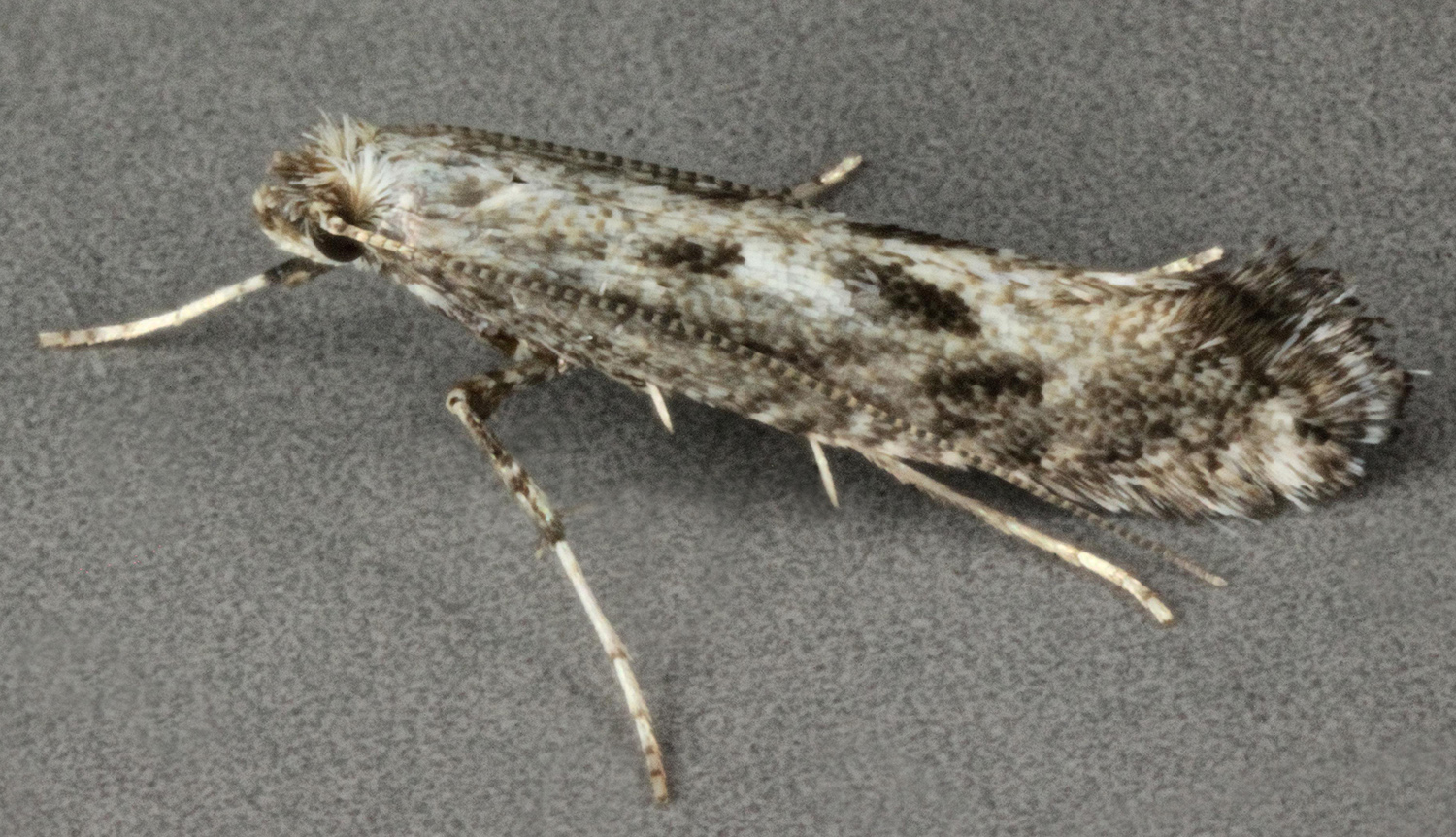

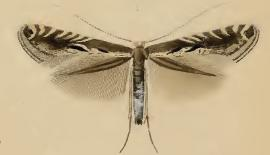

Scientific classification
- Kingdom: Animalia
- Phylum: Arthropoda
- Clade: Pancrustacea
- Class: Insecta
- Order: Lepidoptera
- Family: Gracillariidae
- Genus: Parornix
- Species: P. anglicella

Binomial name
- Parornix anglicella (Stainton, 1850)

Synonyms
- Parornix fragariae (Stainton, 1874); Parornix nebulea (Haworth, 1828); Parornix rubiella Caradja, 1920

= Parornix anglicella =

Species of moth

Parornix anglicella is a moth of the family Gracillariidae found in Asia and Europe. It was described in 1850, by the English entomologist Henry Tibbats Stainton, from a specimen from Lewisham, Kent.

== Description ==
The wingspan is 9–11 mm. The head is ochreous-whitish mixed with fuscous. Palpi white, apex of second joint and median band of terminal dark fuscous. Forewings are dark fuscous, irrorated with whitish; numerous costal strigulae, a spot in middle of disc and another posteriorly, and suffused dorsal strigidae interrupted by two blackish spots white; a black apical dot; cilia with three entire dark fuscous lines. Hindwings are grey. The larva is pale greenish-grey; dorsal line darker; spots pale; head pale greenish-brown; segment 2 with four black spots.

== Biology ==
Adults are on the wing in two generations in April and May and again in August.

Ovum

Eggs are laid on the underside of the leaves of hawthorns (Crataegus species), but have also been recorded on medlar (Mespilus germanica), rowan (Sorbus aucuparia), wild service tree (Sorbus torminalis) and strawberries (Fragaria species).

Larvae

Feeding starts in a gallery in the epidermis, which leads to a leaf margin and develops into a blotch in the second instar. In the next phase the larva eats through to the upper epidermis, puckers the leaf and the epidermis turns brown and the frass is at one end of the mine. It is distinguished from a Phyllonorycter oxyacanthae mine, by the smaller size and the lower epidermis stays green. After leaving the mine two or more cones are made by folding the leaves downwards in the manner of a Caloptilia rather than other Parornix. Occupied mines can be found from July to September.

Pupa

The pupa is pale-yellow-brown in a whitish cocoon, sometimes spun under a narrowly folded edge of a leaf, or in leaf-litter or an old bird's nest. Pupation takes place in July–August and September to late-April.

== Gallery ==
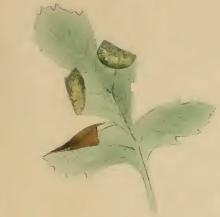
A hawthorn leaf with a mine of a young larva and two cones formed by adult larvae

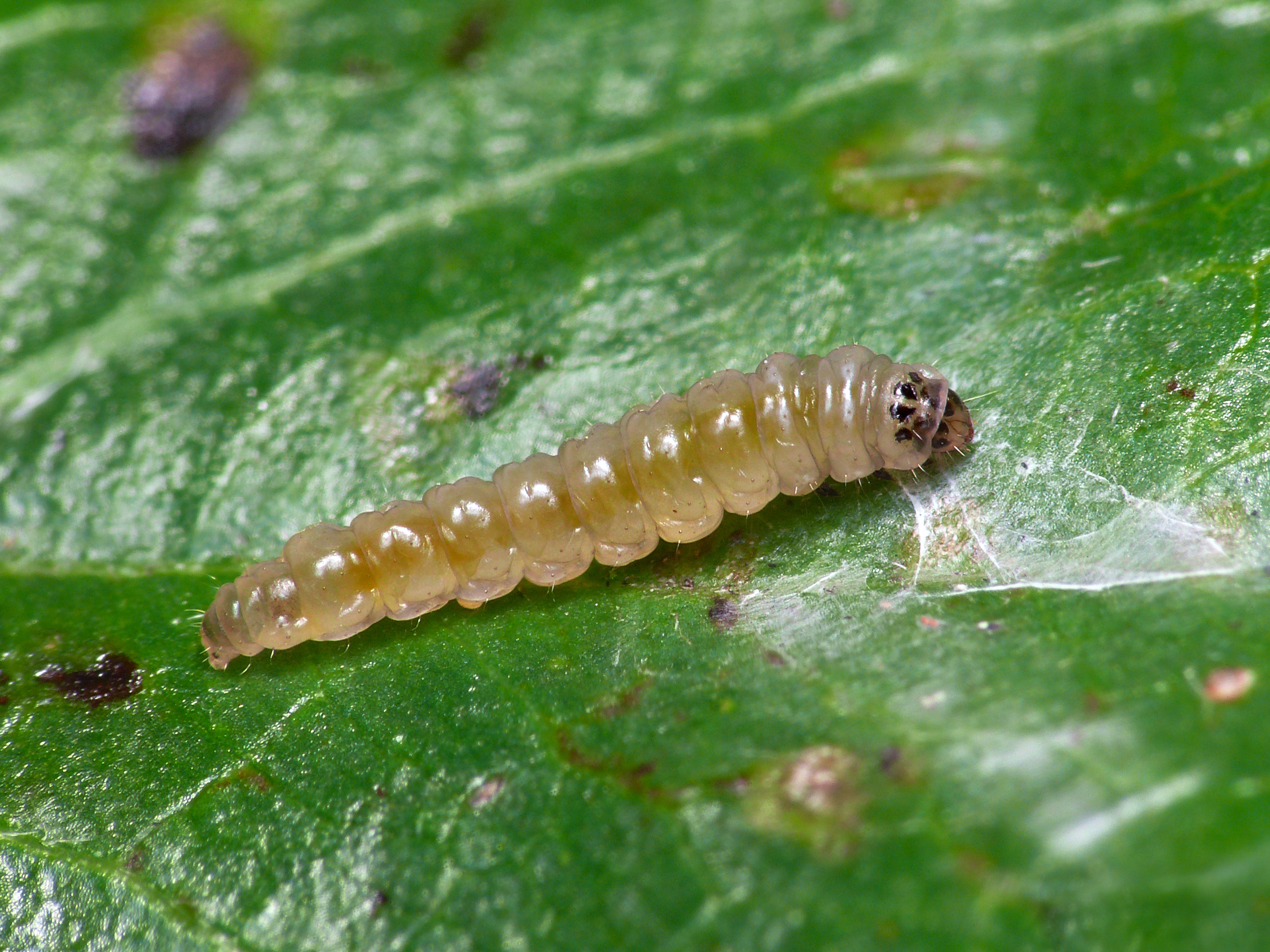

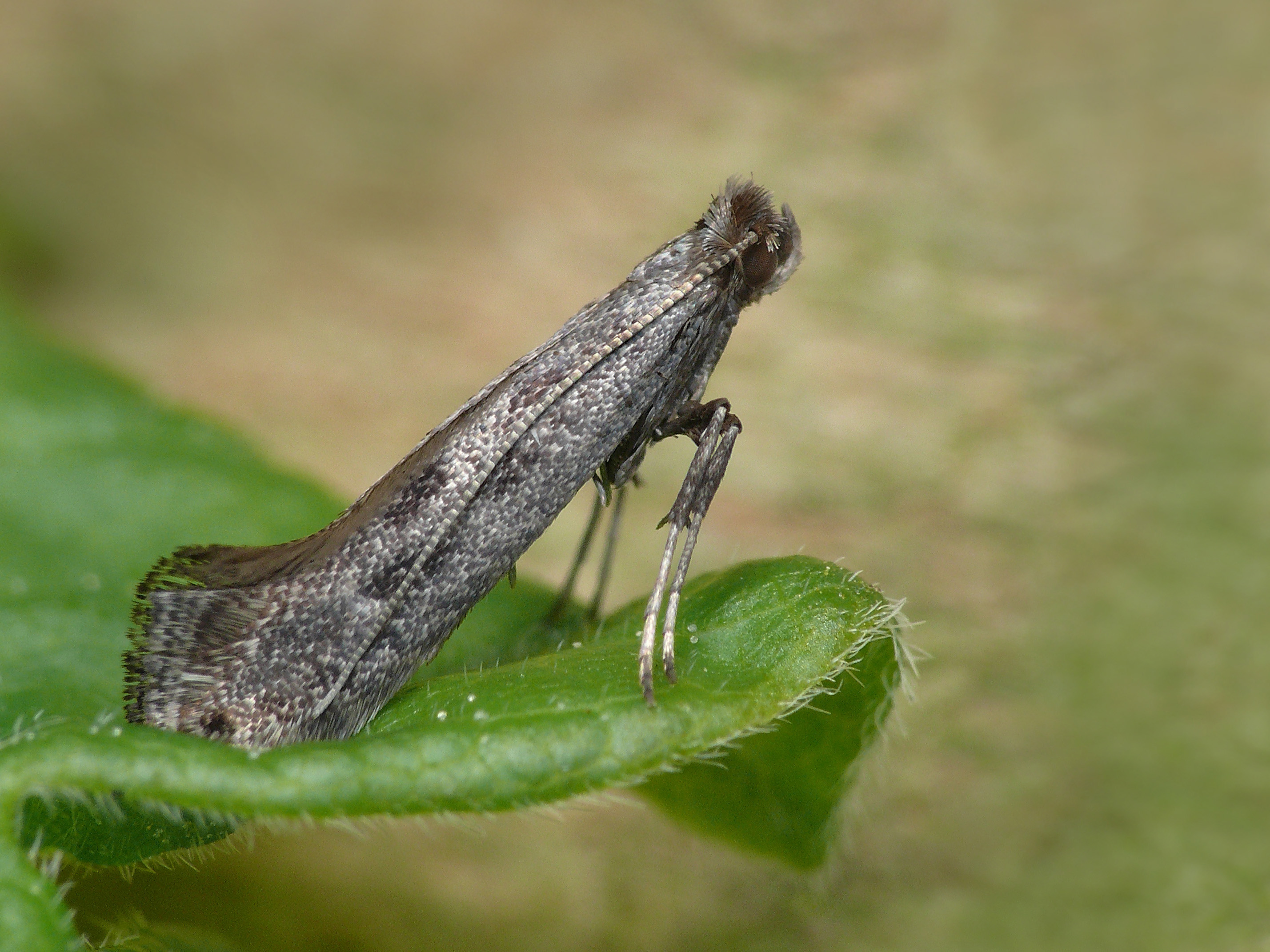

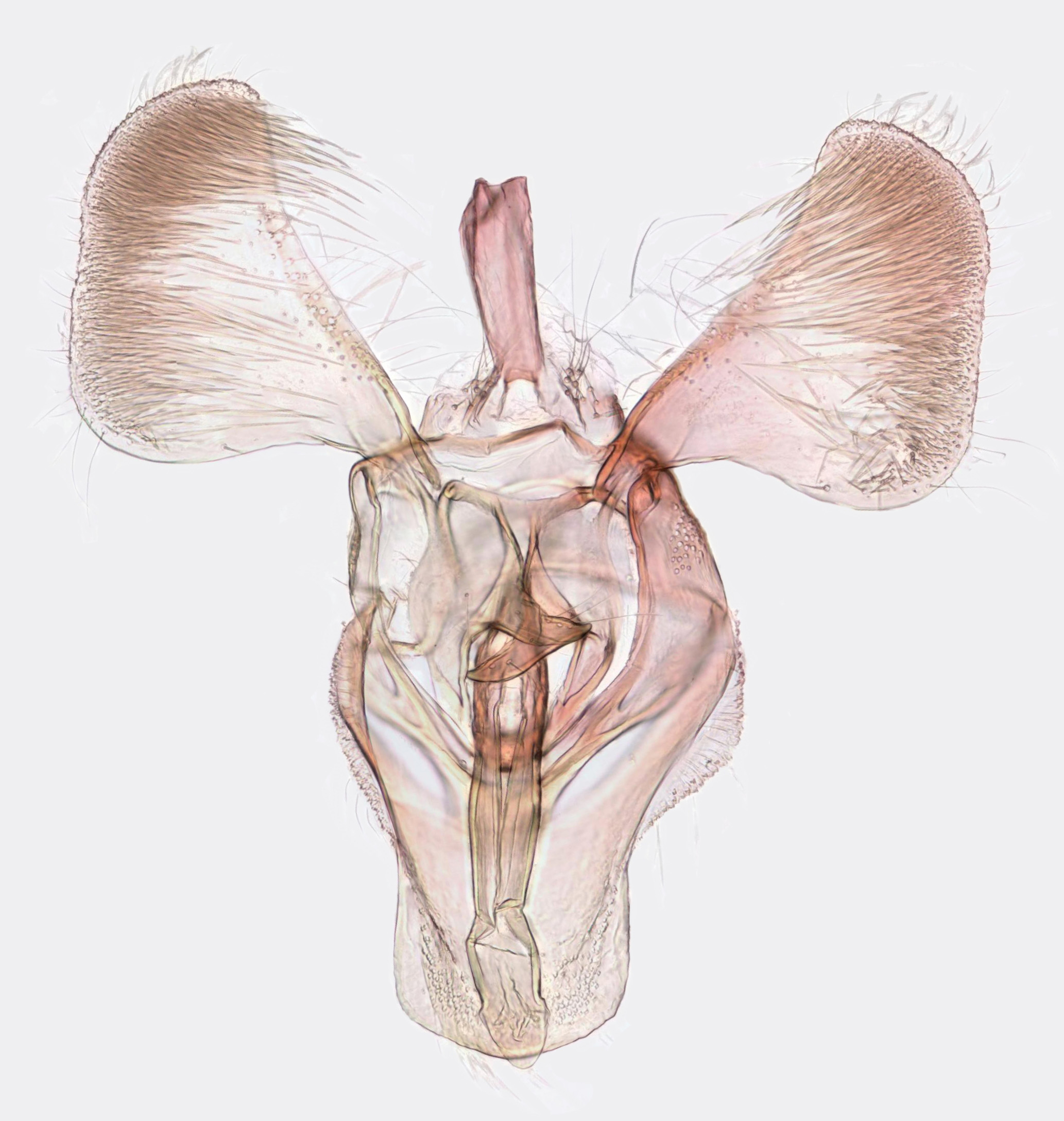

== Distribution ==
It is widespread in: Europe including Albania, Austria, Belarus, Belgium, Bosnia and Herzegovina, Britain, Bulgaria, Croatia, Corsica, Czech Republic, Danish mainland, Estonia, Finland, French mainland, Germany, Hungary, Ireland, Italian mainland, Latvia, Lithuania, Luxembourg, Montenegro, North Macedonia, Norwegian mainland, Poland, Portuguese mainland, Romania, central and northern Russia, Sardinia, Serbia, Sicily, Slovakia, Slovenia, Sweden, Switzerland, Netherlands, Ukraine. Outside Europe it is recorded from the Near East and Nearctic realm.

== Taxonomy ==
The genus Paronix comes from para, meaning alongside and ornix named after the genus Ornix Treitschke, 1833, which refers to ornis, a bird. The genus Ornix originally included a wide range of feathery-winged microlepidoptera in the Coleophoridae and the Gracillariidae. Ornix was an early synonym of the genus Coleophora as a number of moths were named after birds. The feathery-winged moths were later restricted to Paronix. The specific name anglicella refers to Anglicus i.e. English; the type locality is from England.
