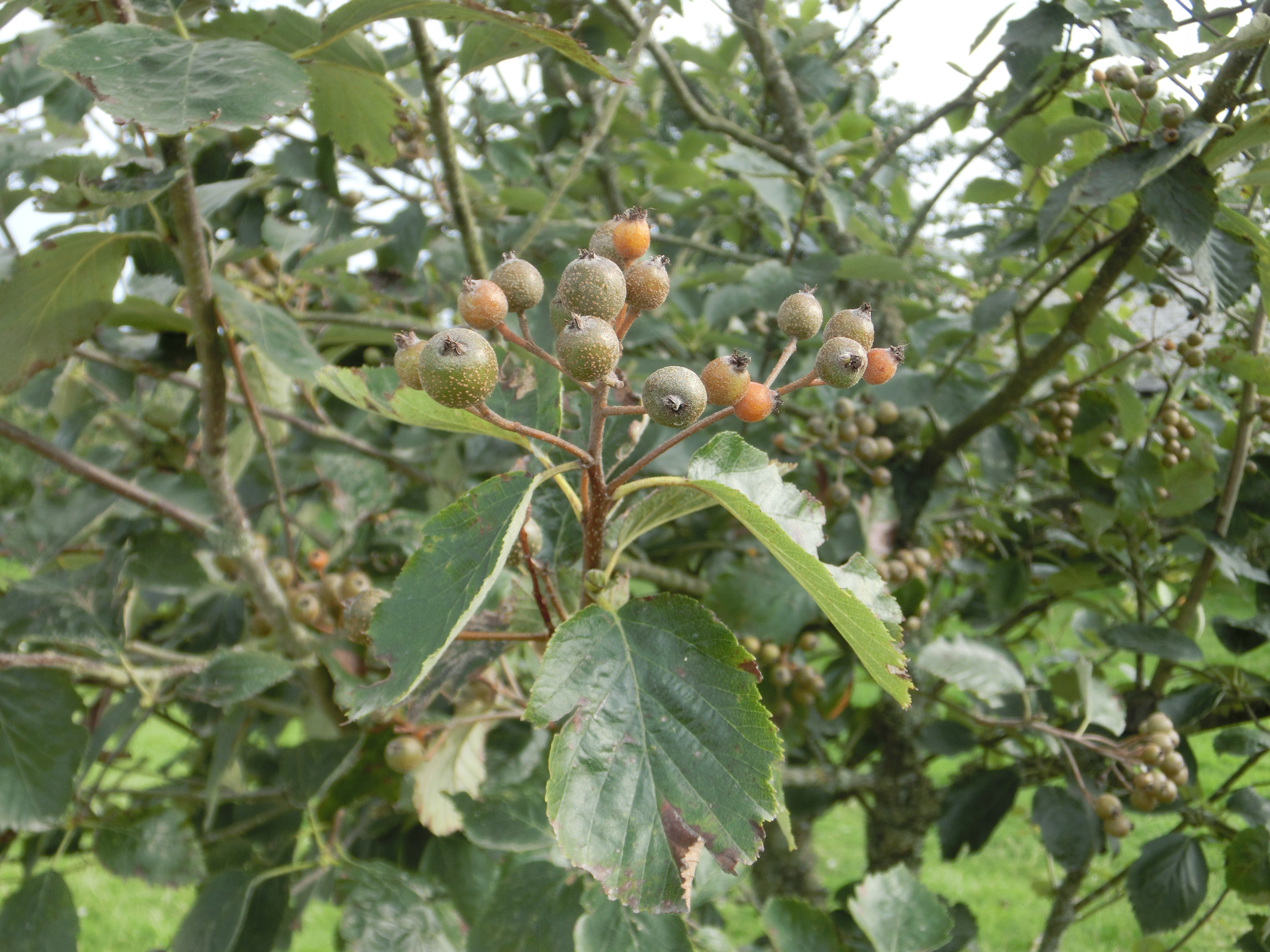
- Devon whitebeam, leaves and young fruit

Conservation status
- Near Threatened (IUCN 3.1)

Scientific classification
- Kingdom: Plantae
- Clade: Tracheophytes
- Clade: Angiosperms
- Clade: Eudicots
- Clade: Rosids
- Order: Rosales
- Family: Rosaceae
- Genus: Aria
- Species: A. devoniensis

Binomial name
- Aria devoniensis (E.F.Warb.) Mosyakin, Fedor. & McNeill

Synonyms
- Pyrus rotundifolia E.S.Marshall; Sorbus latifolia Syme, p. 69; Sorbus devoniensis E.F.Warb.

= Aria devoniensis =

Species of tree

Aria devoniensis, the Devon whitebeam, is a species of tree in the family Rosaceae native to southeastern Ireland and southwestern Great Britain.

== Description ==
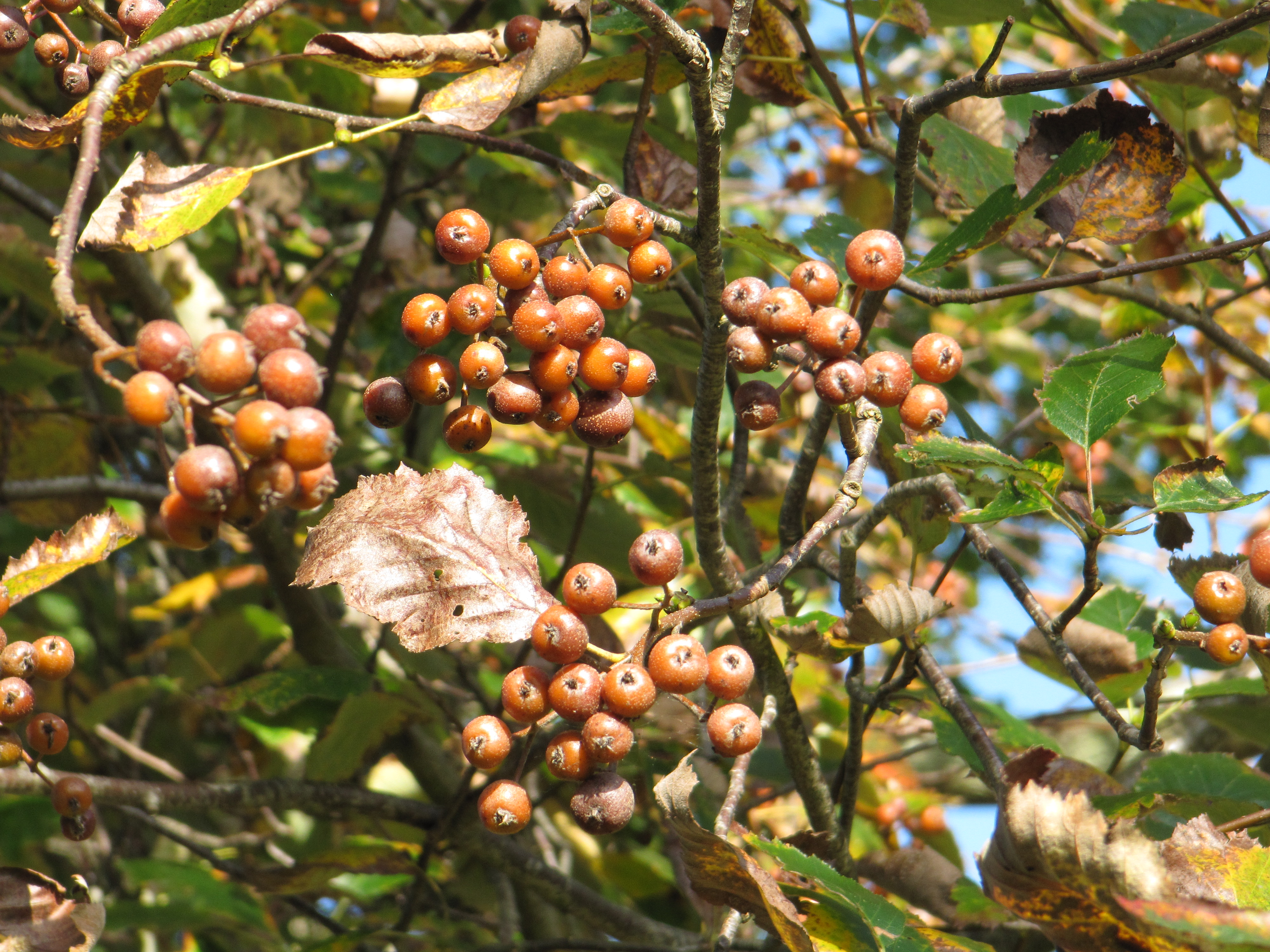
Sorbus devoniensis fruit

It will form a deciduous tree to about 12 metres height.

The leaves are entire, lobed, dark green above, the underside has a dense layer of grey hairs.

It flowers at the end of May, they are white with 5 petals.

The fruit ripen at the end of October. They are orange-brown to brown, and edible.

== Taxonomy ==
It probably did not exist before the last ice age, arising from a hybrid between Sorbus torminalis, the wild service tree, and another species of whitebeam. It is a close relative of the Watersmeet whitebeam, Aria admonitor, and two other British natives and around 40 species in Europe.

== Distribution and habitat ==
Aria devoniensis is native to southeastern Ireland and southwestern Great Britain, where it occurs in hedgerows, woods, rocky woodland, and scrubland.
