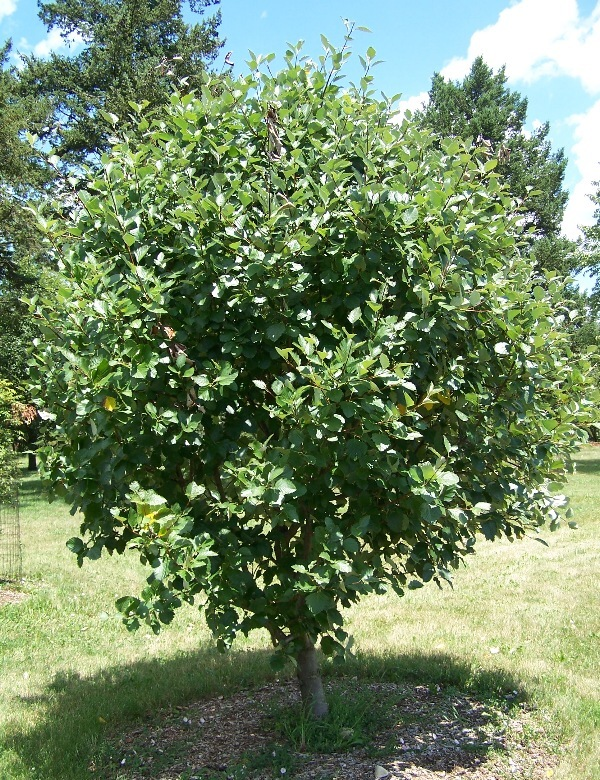
- Aria latifolia growing in the Morton Arboretum

Conservation status
- Vulnerable (IUCN 3.1)

Scientific classification
- Kingdom: Plantae
- Clade: Embryophytes
- Clade: Tracheophytes
- Clade: Angiosperms
- Clade: Eudicots
- Clade: Rosids
- Order: Rosales
- Family: Rosaceae
- Genus: Aria
- Species: A. latifolia

Binomial name
- Aria latifolia (Lam.) M.Roem.
- It is endemic to the area around Paris, France

Synonyms
- List: Crataegus latifolia Lam.; Karpatiosorbus latifolia (Lam.) Sennikov & Kurtto; Pyrus arguta Tausch; Pyrus aria subsp. latifolia (Lam.) Hook.f.; Pyrus intermedia var. latifolia (Lam.) DC.; Pyrus latifolia (Lam.) R.Thomps.; Sorbus aria subsp. latifolia (Lam.) Rouy & E.G.Camus; Sorbus aria proles latifolia (Lam.) Samp.; Sorbus latifolia (Lam.) Pers.; × Tormaria latifolia (Lam.) Mezhenskyj; Torminaria latifolia (Lam.) Dippel; Aria arguta M.Roem.; Aria latifolia var. rotundifolia Lavallée; Crataegus dentata Thuill.; Pyrus atrovirens K.Koch; Pyrus intermedia Soy.-Will. ex Nyman; Pyrus latifolia var. dentata Irmisch; Sorbus atrovirens K.Koch; Sorbus latifolia var. ambigens Chabert; Sorbus latifolia var. typica C.K.Schneid.

= Aria latifolia =

Species of tree

Aria latifolia, the broad-leaved whitebeam, service tree of Fontainebleau, or alisier de Fontainebleau in French, is a species of whitebeam that is endemic to the area around Fontainebleau, south of Paris in France, where it has been known since the early eighteenth century.

== Description ==
Aria latifolia is a deciduous, up to 20 m tall tree with a trunk up to 60 cm in diameter. The bark is smooth and grey, and becomes fissured at the base in old trees. The leaves are 5–10 cm long and broad (rarely, up to 20 cm long and 12 cm broad), but, most typically, the leaves are approximately as broad as they are long. They are green above, downy with greyish-white hairs beneath, with six to ten small triangular teeth along each margin. The flowers are 1–1.5 cm wide, with five creamy-white petals and yellowish stamens; they are produced in corymbs about eight centimetres in diameter in mid-spring. The fruit is a globular, dull brownish-red, pome of 10–12 mm diameter, dotted with large pale lenticels, ripening in late autumn. The fruit bears 1–2 seeds.

=== Cytology ===
The chromosome count is 2n = 34.

== Taxonomy ==
It was first described as Crataegus latifolia Lam. by Jean-Baptiste Lamarck in 1779. It was moved to the genus Aria (Pers.) J.Jacq. ex Host as Aria latifolia (Lam.) M.Roem. by Max Joseph Roemer in 1847. The tree is of hybrid origin, between Aria torminalis (wild service tree) and a member of the Aria edulis (whitebeam) group, but it exhibits apomixis, breeds true from seed, and shows little to no variation. The Aria latifolia species complex includes numerous other species occurring outside of France which are difficult to differentiate and other species may frequently be misidentified as Aria latifolia. The true Aria latifolia s. str. is endemic to France.

It was at one time thought to be a variety of Hedlundia intermedia (Swedish whitebeam), and it was treated as such by some authors, such as A. P. de Candolle and J. C. Loudon, during the nineteenth century. Reflecting the considerable difference in opinion over the past two centuries as to its origins and identity, many synonyms have been used for the tree, including Crataegus latifolia Lam.; Pyrus latifolia (Lam.) Lindl.; P. intermedia var. latifolia (Lam.) D.C., and P. edulis Willd.

=== Etymology ===
The specific epithet latifolia, from the Latin latus meaning broad, and folium meaning leaf, means broad-leaved.

== Distribution and habitat ==
Aria latifolia sensu stricto with a restricted distribution around Paris is endemic to France. All of the populations are found within 100 km from the Fountainebleau forest, where it was first discovered. The introduced population in Britain and Ireland differs from the French population from Fontainebleau.

== Conservation ==
Aria latifolia is a vulnerable species with about 1000–8000 individuals growing at 6 locations. It is cultivated in numerous botanic gardens, but it is unclear if the plants in these collections represent Aria latifolia sensu stricto from Fontainebleau, France. The ancient woodlands where it occurs are under the protection of France's Office National des Forêts.

== Uses ==
Aria latifolia is sometimes planted as an ornamental tree in parks, arboreta, botanical gardens, and forests. Although it is rare, the edible fruit was sold in markets in Fontainebleau. Its homogeneous and long-lasting wood has proved to be valuable for certain uses.
