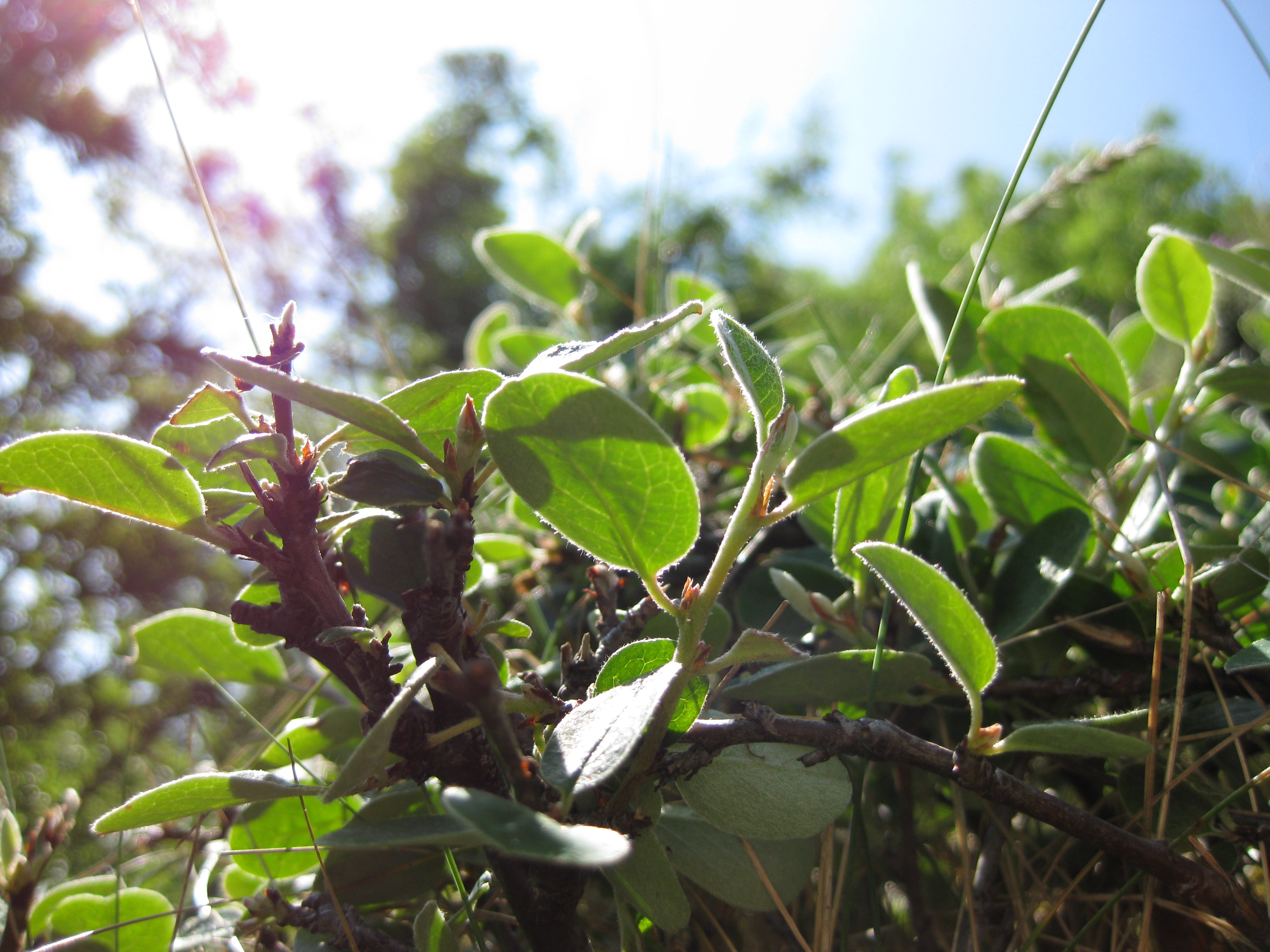

Conservation status
- Critically Endangered (IUCN 3.1)

Scientific classification
- Kingdom: Plantae
- Clade: Tracheophytes
- Clade: Angiosperms
- Clade: Eudicots
- Clade: Rosids
- Order: Rosales
- Family: Rosaceae
- Genus: Cotoneaster
- Species: C. cambricus

Binomial name
- Cotoneaster cambricus J.Fryer & B.Hylmö

= Cotoneaster cambricus =

Species of flowering plant

Cotoneaster cambricus (wild cotoneaster; Welsh: Creigafal y Gogarth "rock apple of Gogarth") is a species of Cotoneaster endemic to the Great Orme peninsula in north Wales. It is the only species of Cotoneaster native to the British Isles. It has never been found naturally at any other location. In the past, it was included within the widespread eastern European Cotoneaster integerrimus, but differs from that in genetic profile.

It is a deciduous shrub growing to 1.5 metres (4 ft 11 in) tall and 2 metres (6 ft 7 in) broad. The leaves are oval-pointed, 1–4 centimetres (0.39–1.57 in) long, green and thinly pubescent above, densely so below and on the leaf margin, with white hairs. The flowers appear in corymbs of one to four (occasionally up to seven) together in early to mid-spring (earlier than on C. integerrimus), each flower 3 millimetres (0.12 in) in diameter, with five white to pale pink petals. The fruit is a red pome 7–11 millimetres (0.28–0.43 in) diameter, containing two or three seeds. The seed has a very low germination rate.

== Status ==
Cotoneaster cambricus is critically endangered, with only six known plants in the wild, which do not regenerate naturally. This number has been supplemented in recent years by a further 11 cultivated plants, grown from cuttings and seeds. The reintroduction has had limited success, with the 11 additional plants being the only survivors of 33 plants grown and planted. The Biodiversity Action Plan for the species calls for this to be increased to 100 plants by 2030. Specimens are also grown in a number of botanical gardens.

Historically, the species was much more common on the Great Orme when it was discovered in 1783. The population was reduced in the 19th century by collectors deliberately digging up plants for their gardens. More recently overgrazing pressure by sheep, feral goats, and rabbits has reduced the size of the existing plants, reduced flowering and prevented the establishment of new seedlings. They also face competition from invasion seedlings of other species of Cotoneaster taken from cultivated plants in gardens in nearby towns. It has full legal protection under Schedule 8 of the Wildlife and Countryside Act 1981.
