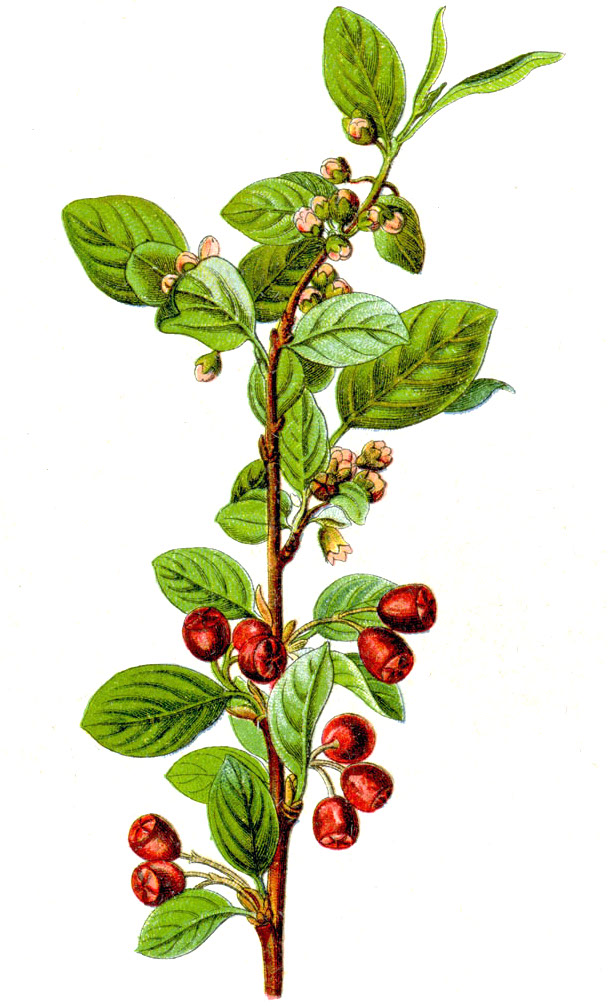
- 1796 painting from Germany

Scientific classification
- Kingdom: Plantae
- Clade: Tracheophytes
- Clade: Angiosperms
- Clade: Eudicots
- Clade: Rosids
- Order: Rosales
- Family: Rosaceae
- Genus: Cotoneaster
- Species: C. integerrimus

Binomial name
- Cotoneaster integerrimus Medik.

Synonyms
- Cotoneaster cotoneaster Degen nom. inval. Cotoneaster cotoneaster H.Karst. nom. inval.

= Cotoneaster integerrimus =

Species of flowering plant

Cotoneaster integerrimus, the common cotoneaster, is a species of Cotoneaster native to central and eastern Europe and southwest Asia, from southern Belgium and eastern France south to Italy, and east through Germany to the Balkans, northern Turkey, the Crimea, the Caucasus and northern Iran; plants in Spain may also belong in this species. In the past, it was treated in a wider sense, including plants from Wales now split off as Cotoneaster cambricus and plants from Scandinavia now treated as Cotoneaster scandinavicus, but differs from these in genetic profile and detail of foliage and fruit.

It is a deciduous shrub growing to 2 metres (6 ft 7 in) tall. The leaves are oval to oval-acute, 1–4 centimetres (0.39–1.57 in) long, green and thinly pubescent above at first, later glabrous, and densely pubescent below and on the leaf margin, with pale grey hairs. The flowers are produced in corymbs of one to four (occasionally up to seven) together in mid spring, each flower 3 millimetres (0.12 in) diameter, with five white to pale pink petals. The fruit is a dark red pome 6–8 millimetres (0.24–0.31 in) diameter, containing two or three seeds, averaging 2.8. Fruits average 85.3% water. It occurs on limestone soils, at altitudes of up to 2,800 metres (9,200 ft) altitude.

== Nomenclature ==
The genus name Cotoneaster comes from Latin cotone, quince, and the suffix -aster, meaning resembling. Cotone is a masculine noun, though in some older works it was wrongly treated as feminine, resulting in different name endings for many of the species, such as Cotoneaster integerrima instead of Cotoneaster integerrimus. The International Code of Botanical Nomenclature (articles 23.5 and 32.7 in the 2007 Vienna code) specifies that such names are not invalid, but are to be corrected without altering the author or date of publication.

== Bibliography ==
- Ehrlén, Johan; Eriksson, Ove (1991). "Phenological variation in fruit characteristics in vertebrate-dispersed plants". Oecologia. 86 (4): 463–470. doi:10.1007/BF00318311. ISSN 0029-8549.
