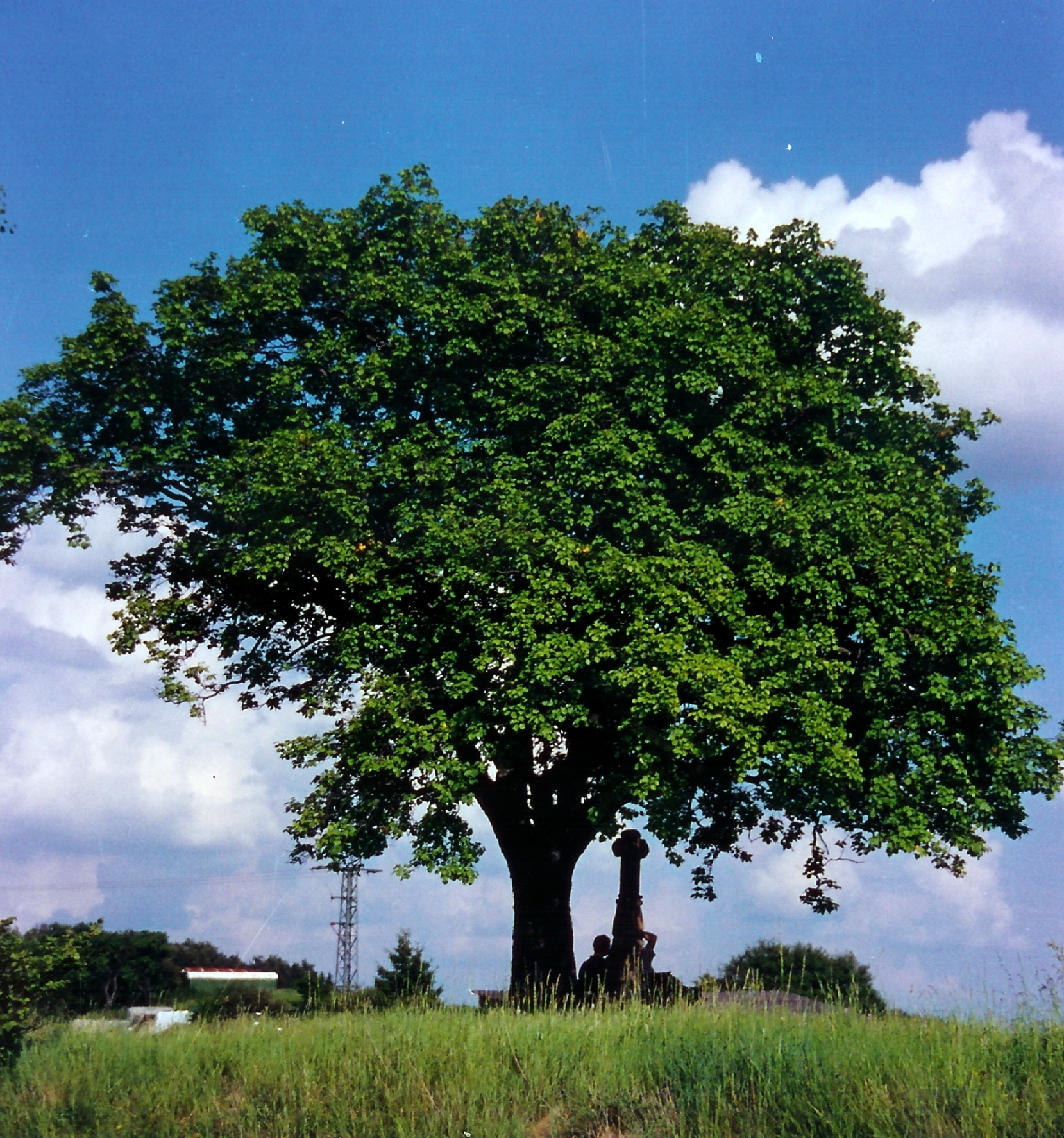

Conservation status
- Least Concern (IUCN 3.1)

Scientific classification
- Kingdom: Plantae
- Clade: Tracheophytes
- Clade: Angiosperms
- Clade: Eudicots
- Clade: Rosids
- Order: Rosales
- Family: Rosaceae
- Genus: Aria
- Species: A. torminalis

Binomial name
- Aria torminalis (L.) Beck
- Distribution map

Synonyms
- List: Aria torminalis f. mollis (Beck) Beck; Azarolus torminalis (L.) Borkh.; Crataegus torminalis L.; Hahnia torminalis (L.) Medik.; Lazarolus torminalis (L.) Borkh.; Malus torminalis (L.) Risso; Mespilus torminalis (L.) Weber ex F.H.Wigg.; Pyrenia torminalis (L.) Clairv.; Pyrus septiloba Stokes; Pyrus latifolia var. semitorminalis (Borbás) M.F.Fay; Pyrus torminalis (L.) Ehrh. in Beitr.; Pyrus torminalis var. glaberrima (Gand.) Asch. & Graebn.; Pyrus torminalis var. mollis (Beck) Asch. & Graebn.; Pyrus torminalis f. mollis Beck; Pyrus torminalis var. perincisa (Borbás & Fekete) Asch. & Graebn.; Pyrus torminalis var. pinnatifida (Boiss.) Asch. & Graebn.; Sorbus glaberrima Gand.; Sorbus guadarramica Pau; Sorbus latifolia var. semitorminalis Borbás; Sorbus orientalis Schönb.-Tem.; Sorbus perincisa Borbás & Fekete; Sorbus semitorminalis (Borbás) Hedl.; Sorbus torminalis (L.) Crantz; Sorbus torminalis f. angustifolia Priszter & Kárpáti; Sorbus torminalis f. araliifolia Kárpáti; Sorbus torminalis subsp. brachyloba O.Schwarz; Sorbus torminalis f. brachyloba Kárpáti; Sorbus torminalis f. brevifolia Priszter & Kárpáti; Sorbus torminalis f. breviloba Kárpáti; Sorbus torminalis f. budensis Kárpáti; Sorbus torminalis var. caucasica Diap.; Sorbus torminalis f. cuneata Kárpáti; Sorbus torminalis f. dolichocarpa Kárpáti; Sorbus torminalis f. dolichocarpa Kossetz; Sorbus torminalis f. domokosiana Kerényi & Kárpáti; Sorbus torminalis f. genuina Kossetz; Sorbus torminalis f. glaberrima (Gand.) Hegi; Sorbus torminalis f. grosseserrata Kárpáti; Sorbus torminalis f. inaequalis Kárpáti; Sorbus torminalis f. intermedia Kossetz; Sorbus torminalis var. kabylica Chabert; Sorbus torminalis f. kerenyiana Kárpáti; Sorbus torminalis f. kissii (Jáv.) Kárpáti; Sorbus torminalis subsp. kissii Jáv.; Sorbus torminalis var. kissii (Jáv.) Soó; Sorbus torminalis f. longifolia Priszter & Kárpáti; Sorbus torminalis f. longiloba Kárpáti; Sorbus torminalis f. macrocarpa Priszter & Kárpáti; Sorbus torminalis f. macrophylla Kárpáti; Sorbus torminalis f. microcarpa Priszter & Kárpáti; Sorbus torminalis f. microphylla Kárpáti; Sorbus torminalis var. mollis (Beck) Diap.; Sorbus torminalis f. mollis (Beck) C.K.Schneid.; Sorbus torminalis f. obtecta Priszter & Kárpáti; Sorbus torminalis var. obtusa Nyár.; Sorbus torminalis f. obtusa (Nyár.) Kárpáti; Sorbus torminalis var. orientalis (Schönb.-Tem.) Gabrieljan; Sorbus torminalis f. orientalis (Schönb.-Tem.) Browicz; Sorbus torminalis f. pendula Priszter & Kárpáti; Sorbus torminalis f. penzesiana Kárpáti; Sorbus torminalis f. perincisa (Borbás & Fekete) Beck; Sorbus torminalis subsp. perincisa (Borbás & Fekete) Jáv.; Sorbus torminalis var. perincisa (Borbás & Fekete) C.K.Schneid.; Sorbus torminalis f. pinnatifida (Boiss.) Kárpáti; Sorbus torminalis var. pinnatifida Boiss.; Sorbus torminalis f. pisifera Priszter & Kárpáti; Sorbus torminalis f. platyloba Kárpáti; Sorbus torminalis f. platyphylla Kárpáti; Sorbus torminalis f. pomoidea Kárpáti; Sorbus torminalis f. priszteri Kárpáti; Sorbus torminalis f. rotundata Priszter & Kárpáti; Sorbus torminalis var. semitorminalis (Borbás) Düll; Sorbus torminalis f. semitorminalis (Borbás) Jáv.; Sorbus torminalis f. sphaerocarpa Priszter & Kárpáti; Sorbus torminalis f. stenoloba Kárpáti; Torminalis clusii K.R.Robertson & J.B.Phipps; Torminalis glaberrima (Gand.) Sennikov & Kurtto; Torminalis orientalis (Schönb.-Tem.) K.R.Robertson & J.B.Phipps; Torminaria clusii M.Roem.; Torminaria clusii var. pubescens Lavallée; Torminaria torminalis (L.) Dippel; Torminaria vulgaris Schur

= Aria torminalis =

Genus of trees in the rose family

Aria torminalis is a species of flowering plant in the rose family, Rosaceae. It is a tree commonly known as wild service tree, chequers, and checker tree, which is native to Europe, northwestern Africa, and western Asia.

The species was formerly included within the genus Sorbus as the section Torminaria, but the simple-leafed species traditionally classified in Sorbus are now considered to form a separate monophyletic group.

== Description ==
Aria torminalis is a medium-sized deciduous tree growing to about 30 m (100 ft) tall, with a trunk up to 1.3 m in diameter. The bark is smooth and grey when young, becoming scaly and flaking away in squarish plates to reveal darker brown layers when about 30 years old. Young twigs are lightly hairy, quickly becoming glabrous, and brownish in colour. Winter identification is made easier by the buds, which are green and pea-sized with obvious brown-edged scales.

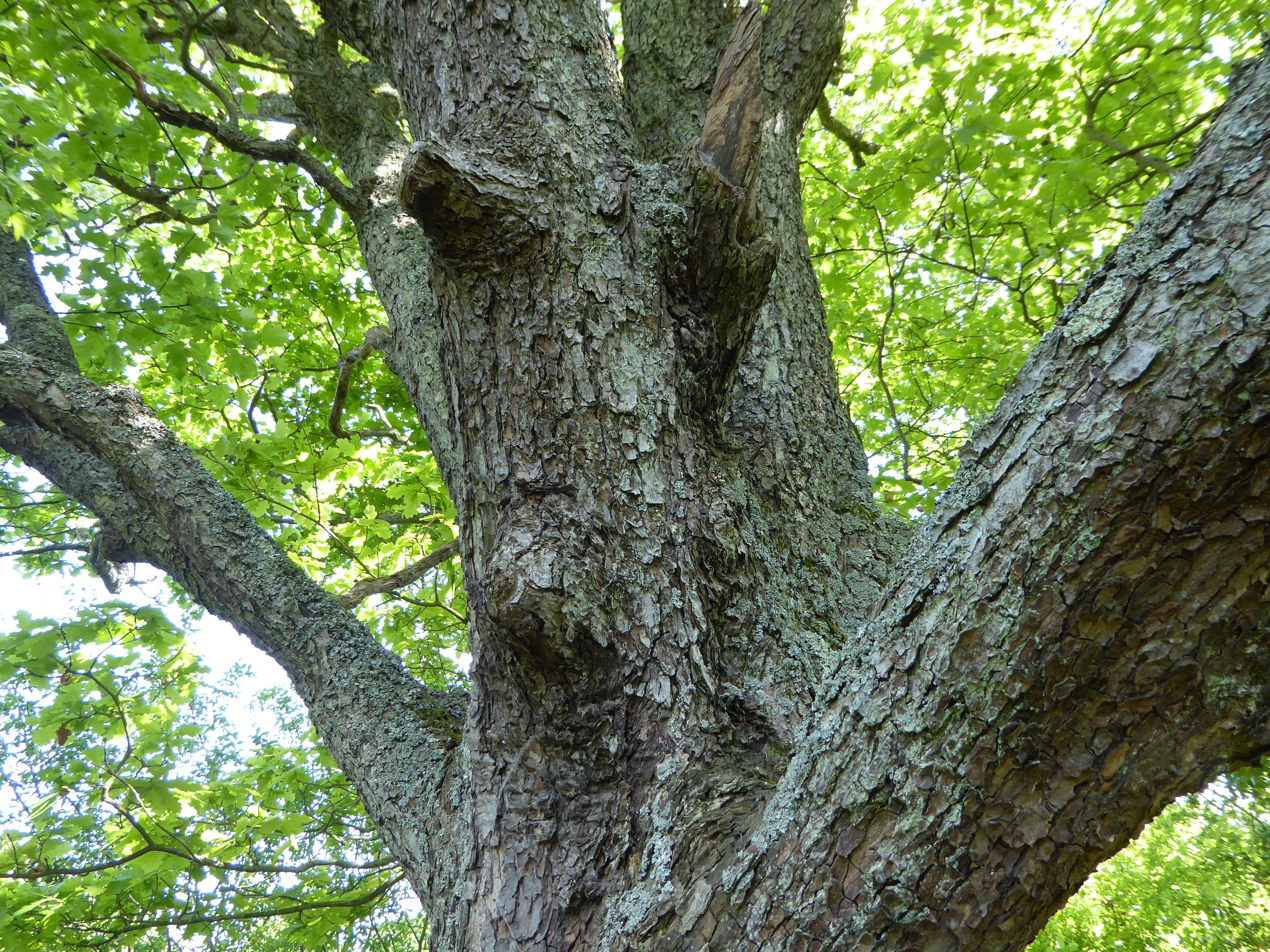
Wild service tree has characteristically square flaky patches of bark.

The leaves are 6–14 centimetres (2–6 inches) long and broad with a 2.5–5 cm (1–2 in) petiole, dark green on both sides, with five to nine acute lobes; the basal pair of lobes are spreading, the rest more forward-pointing and decreasing in size to the leaf apex, and with finely toothed margins; the undersides have small hairs when young, but both sides are smooth and shiny when older; the autumn colour is yellow to red-brown. The flowers are 10–15 millimetres (3/8–5/8 in) in diameter, with five white petals and 20 creamy-white stamens; they are produced in corymbs 5–12 cm (2–4 1/2 in) diameter in late spring to early summer, and are hermaphroditic and insect pollinated. The fruit is a globose to ovoid pome 10–15 mm in diameter, greenish to russet or brown, patterned with small pale lenticel spots when mature in mid to late autumn.

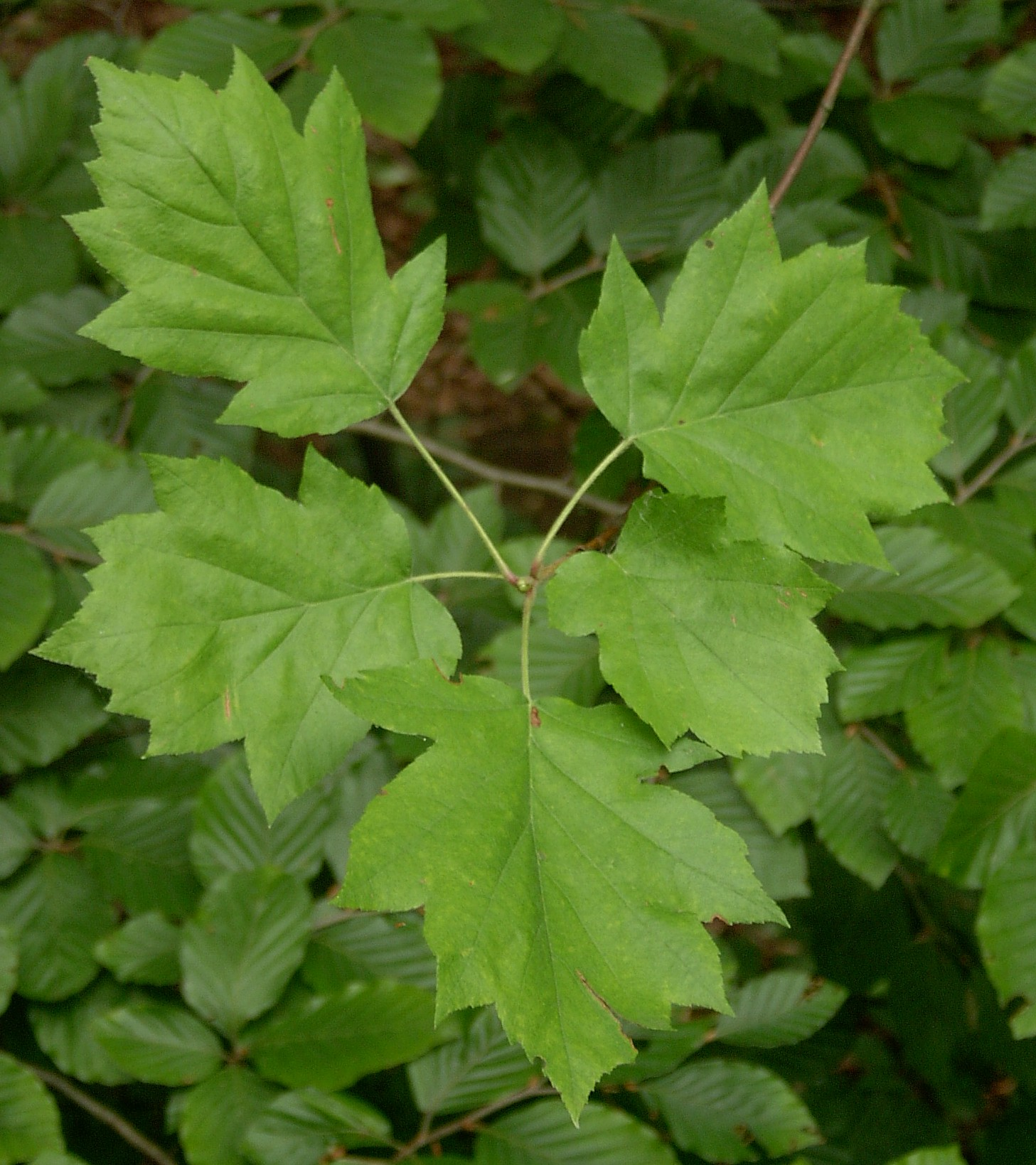
The leaves are broadly 7-lobed, with the lower pair of lobes divergent.

== Taxonomy ==
Wild Service-tree was first named by Linnaeus as Crataegus torminalis in Species Plantarum in 1753, but of course it was known long before that. Pre-Linnean polynomials include Crataegus foliis cordatis acutis: lacinulis acutis serratis, "the hawthorn with sharp cordate leaves [and] sharp serrated lobes", from Hortus Cliffortianus, 1737, and Mespilus, apii folio, sylvestris non spinosa "the spineless mespil of the woods, with celery leaves", from Bauhin's Pinax Theatri Botanici, 1623.

Which genus the wild service-tree should be placed in has been a matter of debate for centuries. Apart from Linnaeus's original Crataegus, it has been placed in Pyrus, Malus, Mespilus, Torminaria and various other genera over the years. Until recently it was commonly known as Sorbus torminalis but since about 2010 it has become increasingly apparent from genetic studies that it is not very closely related to the pinnate-leaved plants in that genus. The name Torminalis glaberrima, in the monotypic genus Torminalis, was published in 2017 and is endorsed by more recent studies. However, there remained some uncertainty about whether it should be in a genus on its own or combined with some other closely related plants. In 2025 Mosyakin, Fedoronchuk, and McNeill published a simplified set of generic delimitations in tribe Maleae. Based on morphological and genetic analysis they consolidated the genera Chamaemespilus, Karpatiosorbus, Majovskya, and Torminalis into Aria, and the genera Normeyera and Scandosorbus into Hedlundia. This new classification is accepted by Plants of the World Online.

Rushforth identified two varieties:

- Torminalis glaberrima var. torminalis. Europe, northwest Africa.
- Torminalis glaberrima var. caucasica. Caucasus and Alborz Mountains. Leaves less deeply lobed than in var. torminalis.

Aria torminalis is a sexually reproducing diploid species that forms diploid and polyploid hybrids with other members of the genus Aria (whitebeams). A number of often very localised stable apomictic polyploid species of ultimately hybrid origin between A. torminalis and various species in the genus Aria occur in Europe, including Aria latifolia (service tree of Fontainebleau), and A. bristoliensis (Bristol whitebeam).

=== Etymology ===
The tree's Latin name, torminalis, means "good for colic".

The name "service-tree" is thought to be derived from the Latin word for beer, cervesa. This in turn is an adaptation of the (hypothetical) Proto-Celtic term *kurmi, and was introduced into the Roman language by Pliny the Elder in his Natural History of 77 AD. Thus, the words "sorb", "Sorbus", and "serve/service" all come ultimately from the Celtic word for beer, and are applied to this plant because the fruits of the closely related true service tree were used to flavour that beverage in ancient Gaul.

In Anglo-Saxon, *kurmi became syrfe, either by re-importation from Vulgar Latin or directly from the Celtic, and has since morphed into a variety of forms, including "Surrey". Another English common name is "chequers (or checkers) tree", for which a variety of origins have been proposed. Some authors have suggested that the pattern of dots on the fruits, or the appearance of the bark, is similar to that of a checkers board or a pub sign; but it could simply be that "chequers" and "chokers" are more evolutions of the original cervesa.

== Distribution and habitat ==
It is native to Great Britain (England and Wales) western, central and eastern Europe to Denmark, Poland, and Ukraine, southern Europe, Algeria and Morocco in northwest Africa, Asia Minor and Syria, the Caucasus, and Alborz mountains of Iran.

The wild service tree favours deep fertile soils, but can tolerate a wide range of soil conditions, from chalky, superficial, dry soils to temporarily waterlogged soils, often found alongside the true service tree. It can adapt to a variety of climatic conditions, but occurs most often in lowlands. Wild service tree is a light-demanding species, often out-competed by other hardwood species.

It is relatively rare and in Britain is now usually confined to pockets of ancient woodland, although it can also be found growing in hedgerows. It can often be found associated with oak and ash woods. In Britain, summer temperatures are often too low for the seeds to ripen, so its principal method of propagation is by suckers. Its Ellenberg values in Britain are L=4, F=5, R=6, N=5 and S=0, which means it grows in shady, moist woodland on neutral soils and with moderate fertility, and no tolerance for salt.

== Ecology ==
The fruits are eaten by many birds and a few mammals, making the tree ecologically important.

There are many insects associated with the wild service tree. The goat moth, a moth with the second largest larvae in the UK, deposits its eggs on the bark of the wild service tree. After hatching, the larvae burrow into the tree, feeding on the inner wood, creating large, visible tunnels, causing substantial harm and weakening the tree. Over time, the tunnels can damage the tree's structure, making it prone to diseases, decay, other infestations such as fungal infections or attacks from bark beetles like Scolytus mali. In cases of severe damage, the tree may eventually die. Wood infested by the goat moth has a strong vinegar scent, with a substance described as "fermenting juice" present at the base of the trunk.

The phloeophagous (phloem feeding) black beetle, Scolytus mali, causes damage by chewing through bark to access the phloem. It has a symbiotic relationship with a fungus (from the genus Ophiostoma) in which the beetles carry the spores beneath the bark, and as the fungus grows within the tree infected, it helps to break down the tree's tissues which makes it easier for the beetle to feed on the phloem. This fungus is associated with tree diseases such as Dutch elm disease. Signs that a tree is under attack are lots of tiny entrance holes on the outside of the tree bark, and gnarled tunnels on the underneath of the bark. However, these insects are minute, and the holes can be inconspicuous, meaning it isn't always obvious a tree is infested.

The wild service tree also supports a mite, Eriophyes torminalis Nalepa (1926), which feeds solely on the leaves of this species, making it monophagous. When the mite feeds on the leaf it injects saliva into the surface of the leaf, causing the plant to respond by growing abnormal tissue around the feeding area. This forms hollow galls, which look like brown blisters on both sides of the leaf, encysting the microscopic mites.

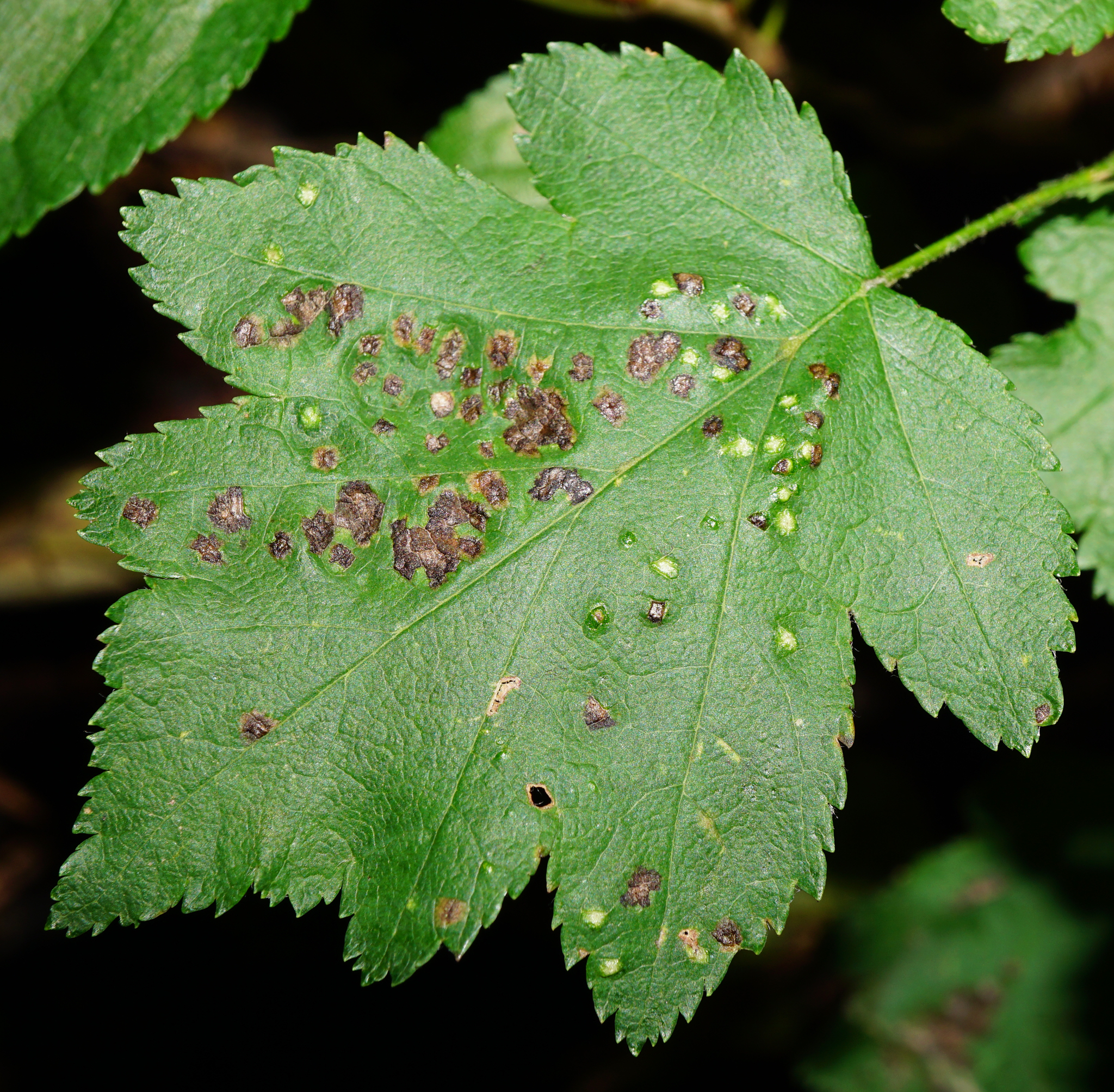
Leaf galls caused by Eriophyes torminalis mites

== Uses ==
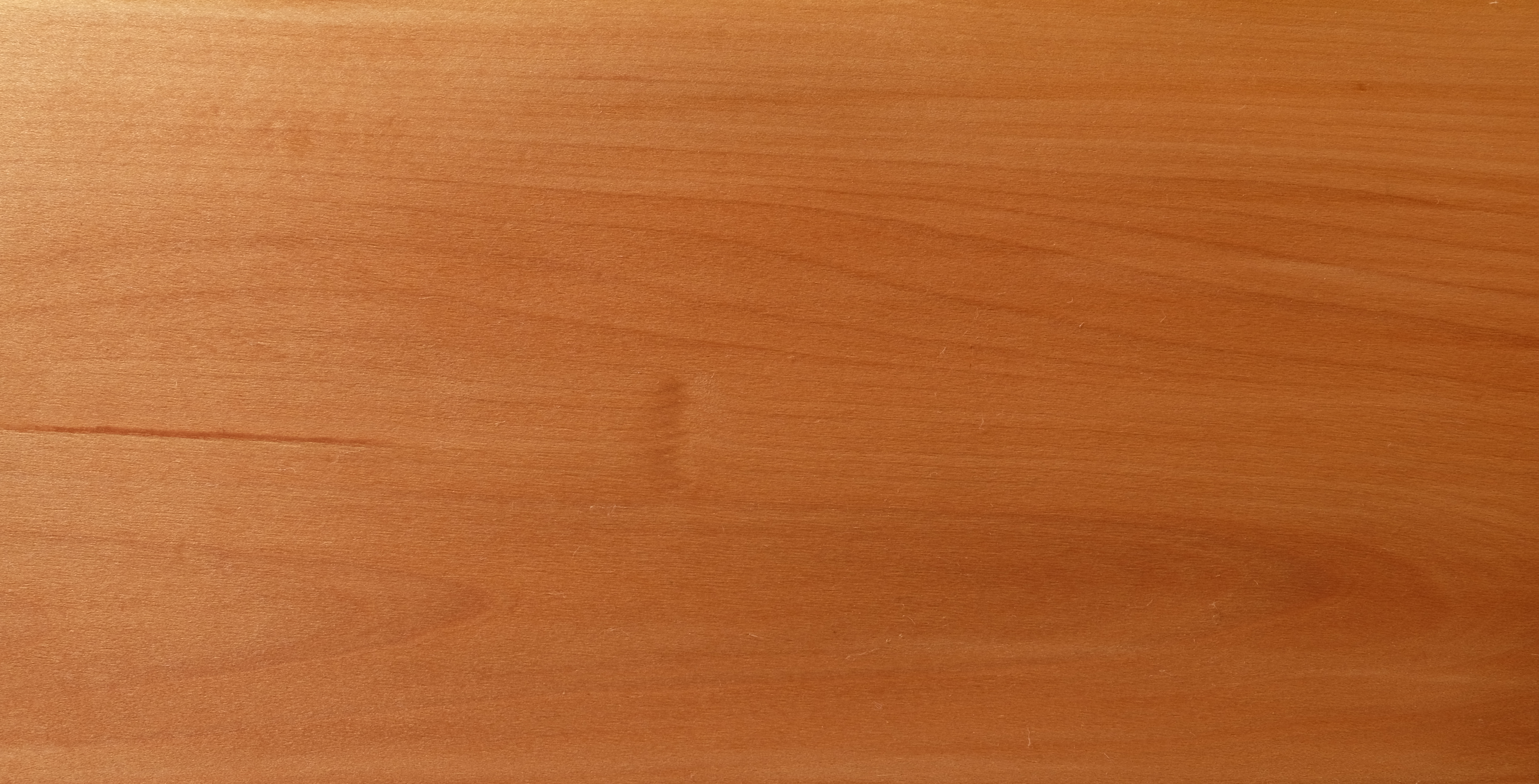
Wood of Aria torminalis

The wild service tree is one of the most valuable hardwoods in Europe. The wood is fine-grained, very dense and has good bending strength. It was used in the past to make screws for winepresses, billiard cue sticks, musical instruments and turnery. Today, it is usually only used for decorative veneers.

The fruit, sometimes called "chequers", are edible and taste similar to dates, although they are now rarely collected for food. They are usually too astringent to eat until they are over-ripe and bletted. They were traditionally known as a herbal remedy for colic. Before the introduction of hops, the fruit were used to flavour beer.

== Gallery ==
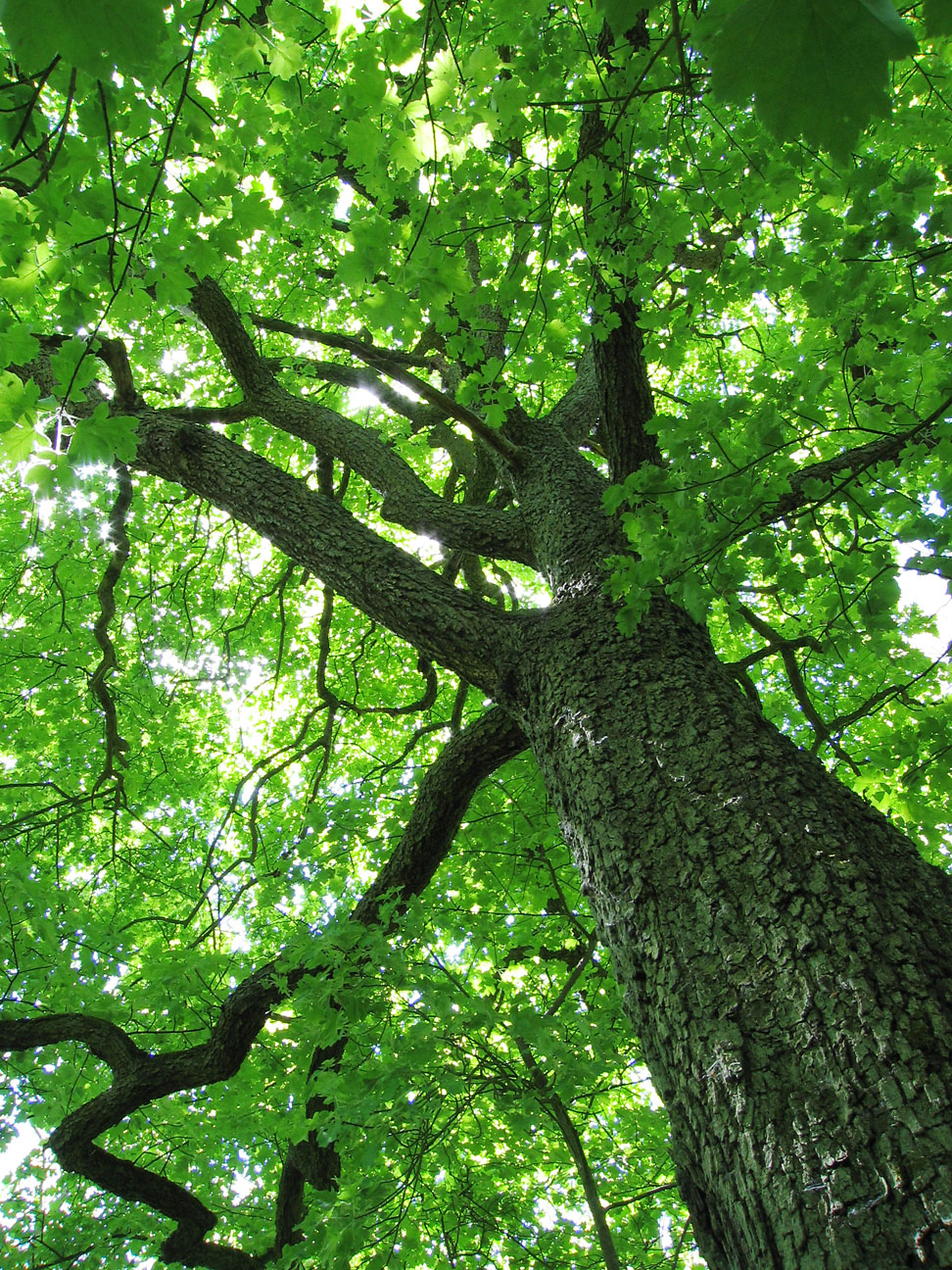
Trunk and leaf canopy

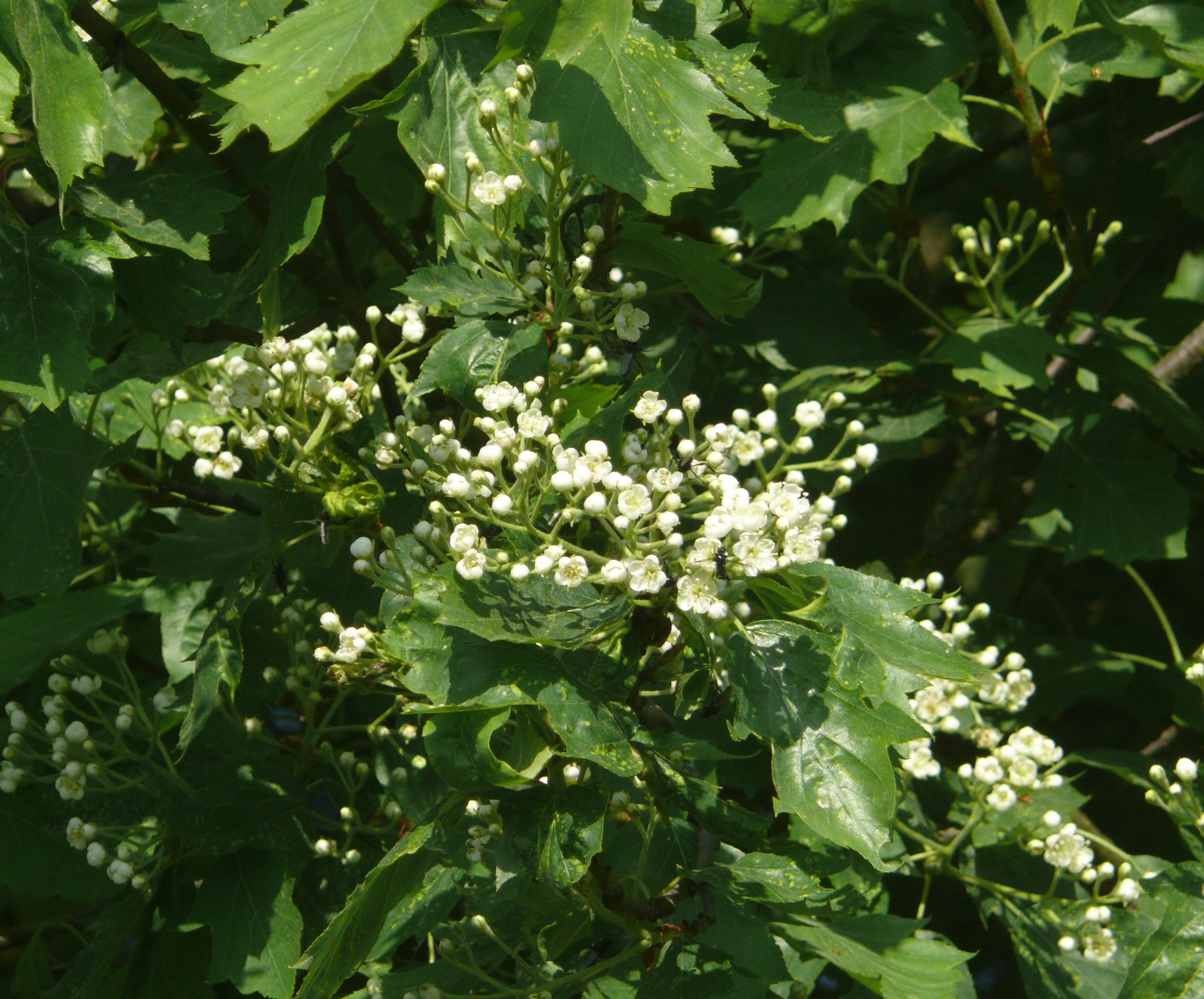
Flowers

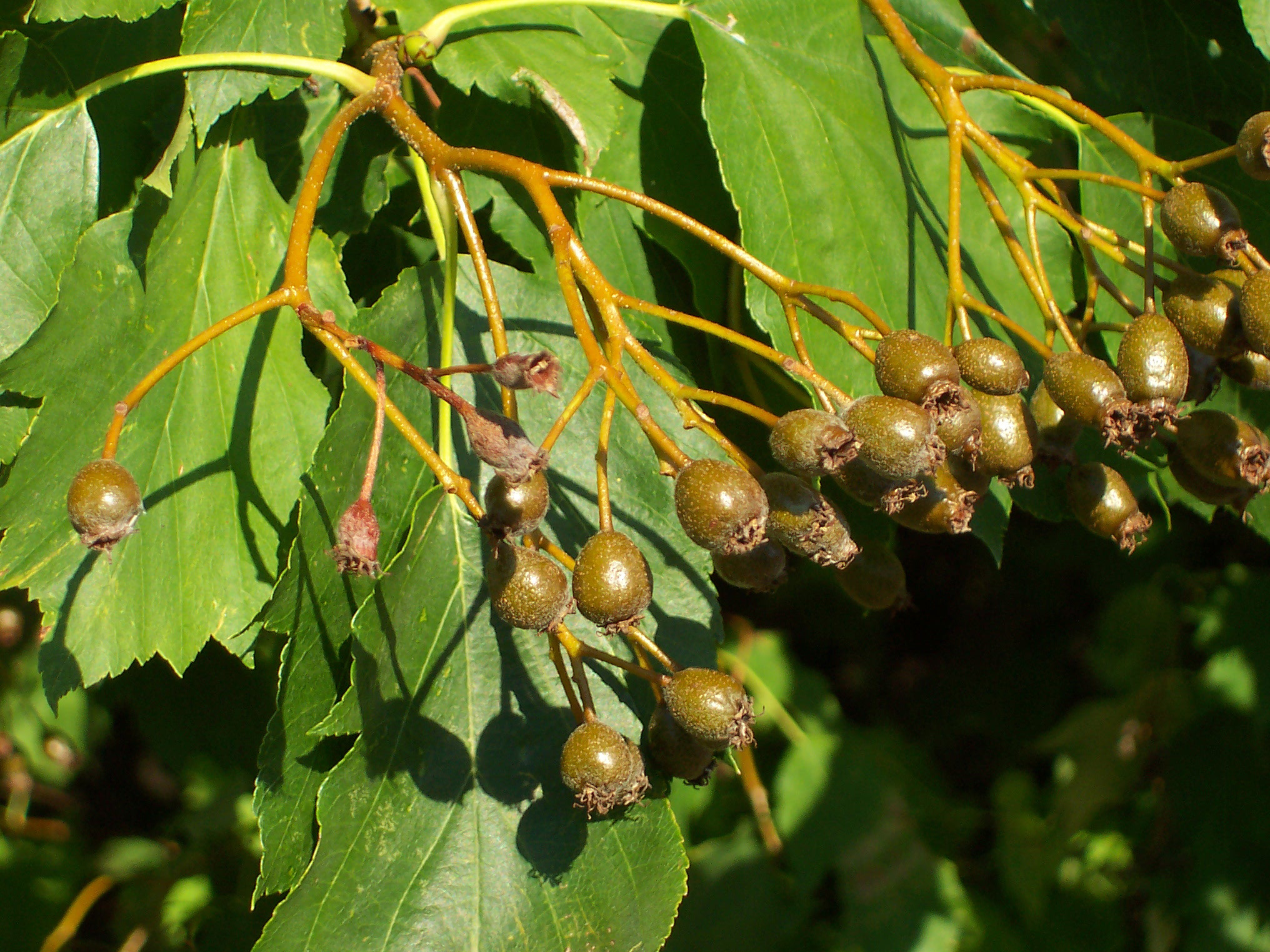
Foliage and fruit

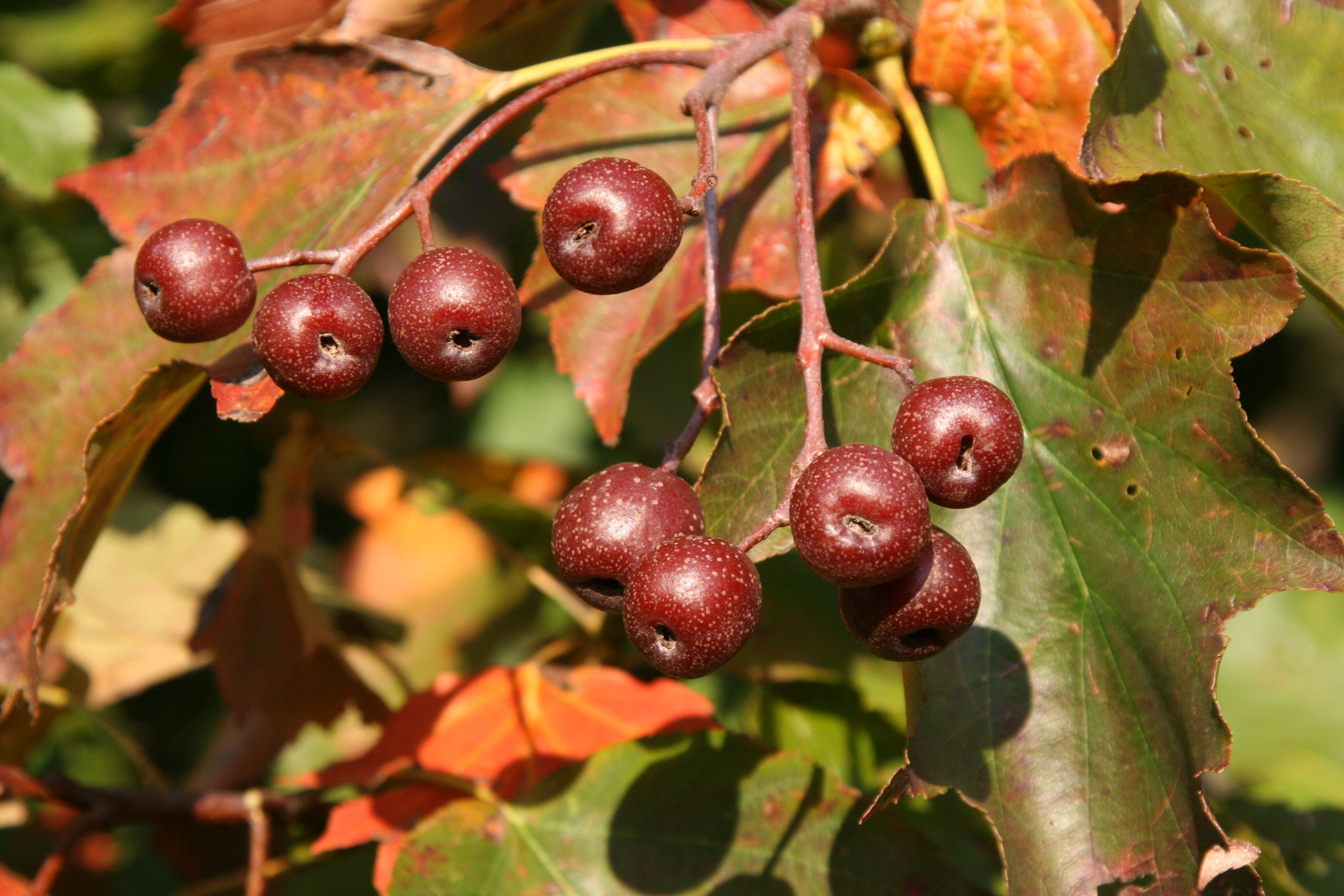
Ripe fruit

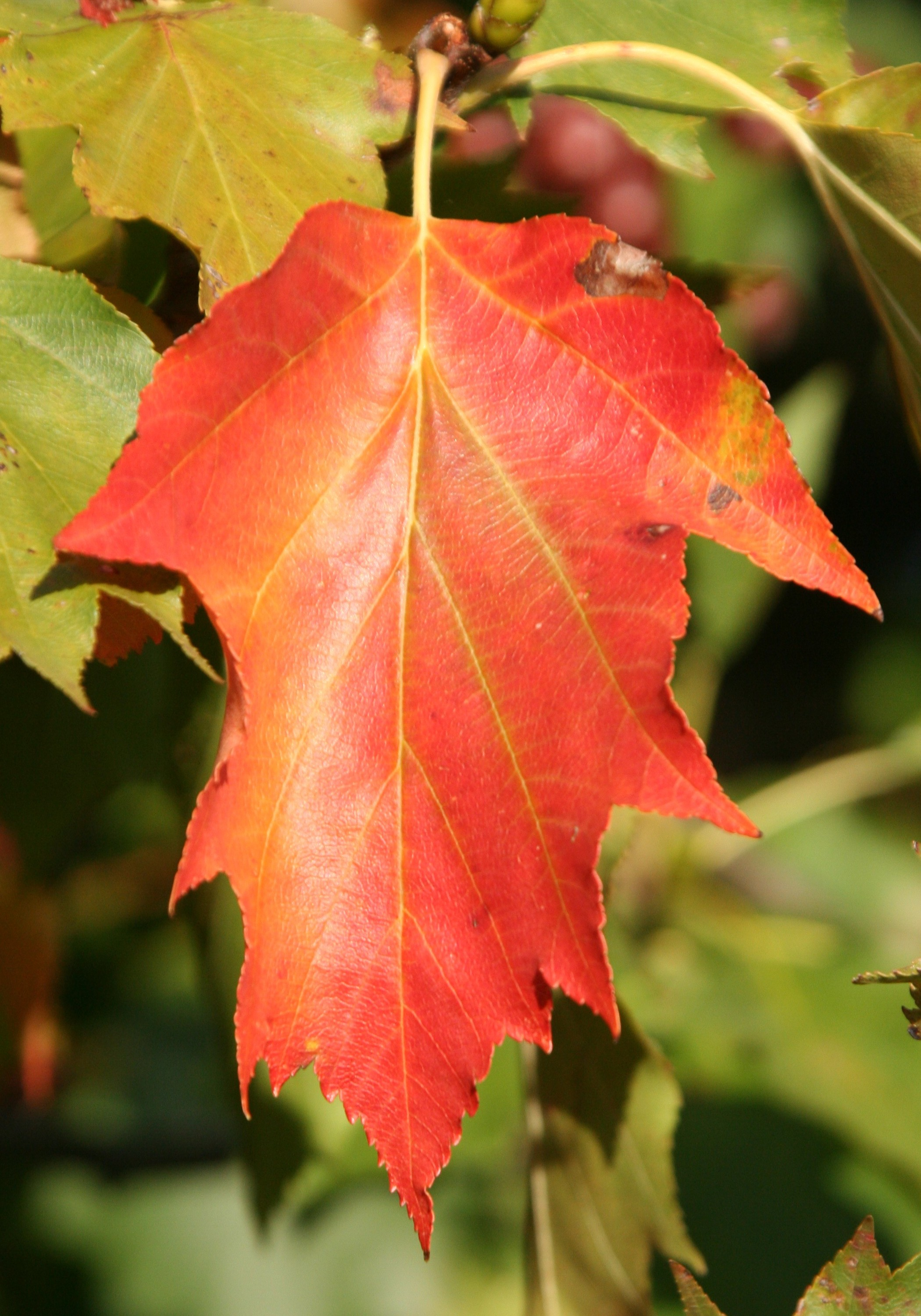
Autumn leaf colour

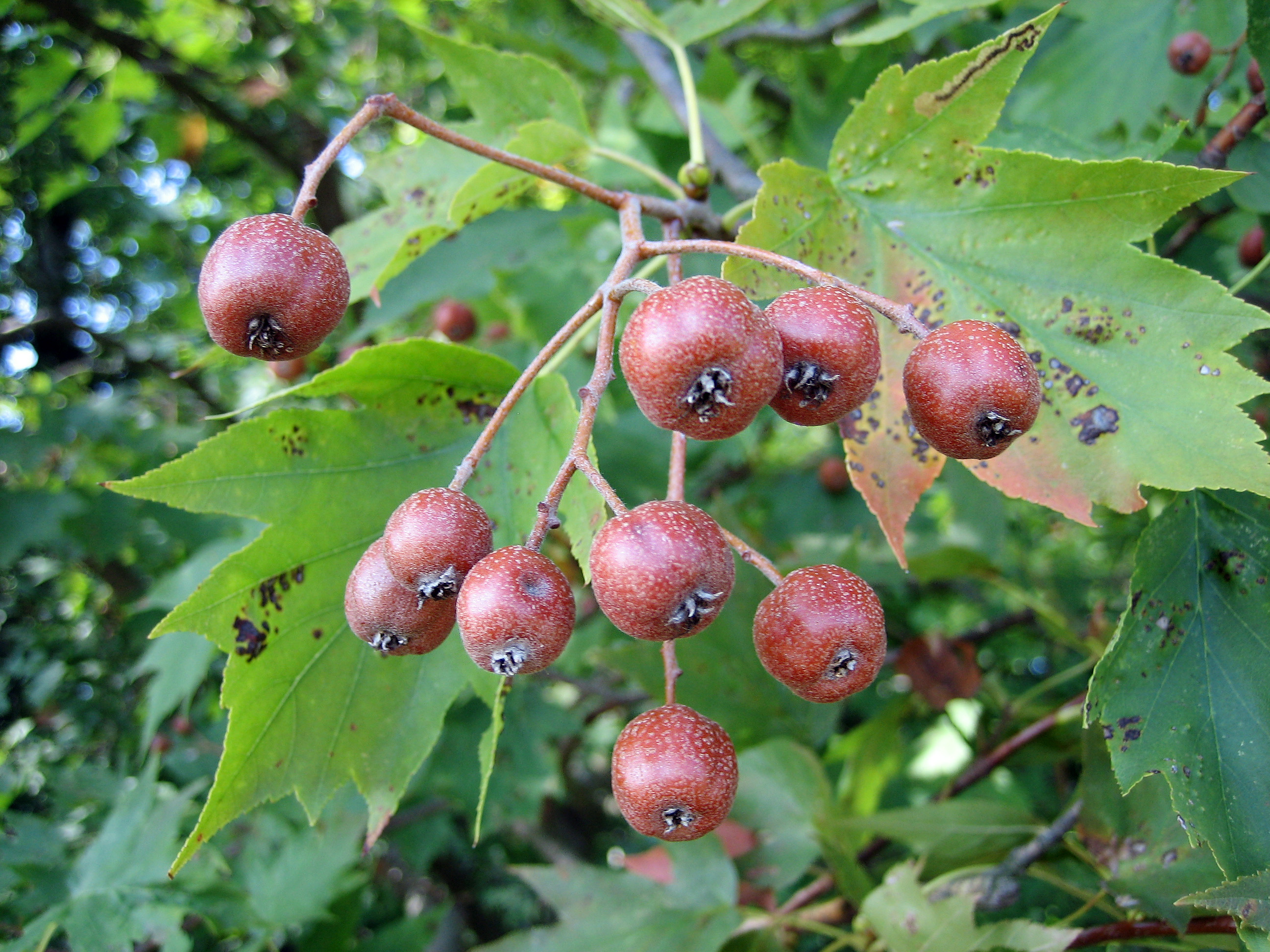
Fruits
