= List of chairs of the National Museum of Natural History (France) =

The following is a list persons who have held the chairs of the Muséum national d'Histoire naturelle. The number of chaired positions, and their subject areas, have evolved since the creation of the original twelve chairs, some being subdivided into two positions and others removed. (Titles translated)

- Animal Anatomy
  - 1793 to 1802: Jean-Claude Mertrud
  - 1802 to 1832: Georges Cuvier. This chair was renamed Comparative Anatomy.
    - Comparative Anatomy
      - 1832 to 1850: Henri Marie Ducrotay de Blainville
      - 1850 to 1855: Georges Louis Duvernoy
      - 1855 to 1868: Etienne Serres
      - 1868 to 1879: Paul Gervais
      - 1879 to 1894: Georges Pouchet
      - 1894 to 1902: Henri Filhol
      - 1903 to 1921: Edmond Perrier
      - 1922 to 1941: Raoul Anthony
      - 1942: Empty
      - 1943 to 1960: Jacques Millot
      - 1961: Empty
      - 1962 to 1984: Jean Anthony
      - 1984 to 2001: Empty
- Human Anatomy
  - 1793 to 1832: Antoine Portal
  - 1832 to 1838: Pierre Flourens. This chair was renamed Anatomy and Natural History of Man.
    - Anatomy and Natural History of Man
      - 1839 to 1855: Etienne Serres. This chair was renamed Anthropology.
        - Anthropology
          - 1855 to 1892: Jean Louis Armand de Quatrefages de Bréau
          - 1892 to 1908: Ernest Hamy
          - 1909 to 1927: René Verneau
          - 1928 to 1936: Paul Rivet. This chair was renamed Ethnology of Modern Man and Fossilized Man when the Musée de l'Homme was created.
            - Ethnology of Modern Man and Fossilized Man
              - 1937 to 1940: Paul Rivet
              - 1941 to 1944: Henri Vallois
              - 1945 to 1949: Paul Rivet
              - 1950 to 1959: Henri Vallois
              - 1960 to 1967: Henri Vallois. This chair was renamed Anthropology and Ethnology.
                - Anthropology and ethnology
                  - 1968 to 1970: Robert Gessain. This chair was renamed Anthropology.
                    - Anthropology
                      - 1970 to 1979: Robert Gessain
                      - 1980 to 1983: Yves Coppens
                      - 1983 to 1985: unknown
- Comparative Physiology
  - 1837-1838: Frédéric Cuvier
  - 1838-1867: Pierre Flourens. This chair was exchanged with the chair of General Physiology by the faculty of Sciences in Paris.
    - 1868-1879: Claude Bernard
- Chemistry
  - 1779 to 1793: Antoine-Louis Brongniart
  - 1804 to 1830: Louis-Nicolas Vauquelin
  - 1830 to 1850: Michel Eugène Chevreul. This chair was renamed Chemistry as Applied to Organic Compounds (Organic Chemistry).
    - Chemistry as Applied to Organic Compounds
    - 1850 to 1889: Michel Eugène Chevreul
      - 1890 to 1915: Léon-Albert Arnaud
      - 1915 to 1919: unknown
      - 1919 to 1925: Louis-Jacques Simon
      - 1926 to 1927: unknown
      - 1928 to 1936: Richard Fosse. This chair joined with the chair of botany to become the chair of Organic and Physical Chemistry of Plants.
        - Organic and Physical Chemistry of Plants
          - 1936 to 1940: Richard Fosse
          - 1941: unknown. This chair was renamed Chemistry as Applied to Organic Compounds.
            - Chemistry as Applied to Organic Compounds
              - 1941 to 1957: Charles Sannié
              - 1958 to 1967: Charles Mentzer
              - 1968: unknown
              - 1969 to 1989: Darius Molho
              - 1989 to 2001: not assigned
- General Chemistry
  - 1793 to 1809: Antoine-François Fourcroy
  - 1809 to 1811: unknown
  - 1811 to 1832: André Laugier
  - 1832 to 1850: Joseph-Louis Gay-Lussac. This chair was renamed Chemistry as Applied to Inorganic Compounds.
    - Chemistry as Applied to Inorganic Compounds
      - 1850 to 1892: Edmond Frémy. This chair was removed.
- Plants in the Countryside (literal translation)
  - 1793 to 1826: Antoine-Laurent de Jussieu
  - 1826 to 1853: Adrien-Henri de Jussieu. This chair was removed and replaced by the chair of paleontology.
- Botany in the Museum
  - 1793 to 1833: René Desfontaines
  - 1833 to 1857: Adolphe Brongniart. This chair was renamed Botany and Plant Physiology.
    - Botany and Plant Physiology
      - 1857 to 1874: Adolphe Brongniart. This chair was renamed Botany, Organology and Plant Physiology.
        - Botany, Organology and Plant Physiology
          - 1874 to 1876: Adolphe Brongniart
          - 1876 to 1879: unknown
          - 1879 to 1914: Philippe Van Tieghem
          - 1914 to 1918: unknown
          - 1919 to 1932: Julien Noël Costantin
          - 1933: unknown. This chair was renamed Comparative Anatomy of Current Plants and Fossils and was removed in 1934. It was restored in 1937.
            - Comparative Anatomy of Current Plants and Fossils
              - 1938 to 1944: Paul Bertrand
              - 1945 to 1958: Auguste Loubière. This chair was changed to Plant Physics.
    - Plant Physics
      - 1857 to 1897: Georges Ville
      - 1898 to 1925: Léon Maquenne
      - 1926 to 1931: Marc Bridel
      - 1931 to 1934: unknown. This chair was removed in 1935. It was restored in 1959.
      - 1959 to 1960: Pierre Donzelot
      - 1961 to 1962: Charles Sadron. This chair was renamed Biophysics.
        - Biophysics
          - 1962 to 1975: Charles Sadron
          - 1976 to 2001: Claude Hélène
- Botany (Classification and Natural Families)
  - 1874 to 1905: Édouard Bureau. After the creation of the chair of Botany (Classification and Natural Families of Cryptogams), this chair was reduced to the Phanerogams (Spermatophytes).
    - Botany (Classification and Natural Families of Phanerogams
      - 1906 to 1931: Henri Lecomte
      - 1931 to 1933: Jean-Henri Humbert. This chair was renamed Phanerogamy.
        - Phanerogamy
          - 1933 to 1957: Jean-Henri Humbert
          - 1958 to 1968: André Aubréville
          - 1969 to 1985: Jean-François Leroy.
          - 1986 to 2001: Philippe Morat
    - Botany (Classification and Natural Families of Cryptogams
      - 1905 to 1931: Louis Mangin
      - 1932 to 1932: Pierre Allorge. This chair was renamed Cryptogamy.
        - Cryptogamy
          - 1933 to 1944: Pierre Allorge
          - 1945 to 1973: Roger Heim
          - 1974: unknown
          - 1975 to 1982: Suzanne Jovet-Ast
          - 1983 to 2001: not assigned
- Horticulture (Agriculture and Culture of Gardens, Vineyards and Orchards)
  - 1793 to 1824: André Thouin
  - 1825 to 1828: Louis-Augustin Bosc d’Antic
  - 1828 to 1850: Charles-François Brisseau de Mirbel
  - 1850 to 1882: Joseph Decaisne
  - 1883: unknown
  - 1884 to 1901: Maxime Cornu
  - 1901 to 1919: Julien Costantin
  - 1920 to 1932: Désiré Bois
  - 1932 to 1956: André Guillaumin
  - 1956 to 1956: unknown. This chair was renamed Applied Plant Biology.
    - Applied Plant Biology
      - 1961 to 1985: Jean-Louis Hamel
- Ecology and the Protection of Nature
  - 1955 to 1958: Georges Kuhnholtz-Lordat. This chair was renamed General Ecology.
    - General Ecology.
      - 1960 to 1962: Paul Rémy
      - 1963 to 1983: Claude Delamare-Deboutteville. In 1983 this chair was transformed into the Service for the Conservation of Nature whose first person in charge was François Terrasson.
- Zoology (Quadrupeds, Cetacea, Birds, Reptiles, Fish)
  - 1793 to 1794: Étienne Geoffroy Saint-Hilaire. This chair was subdivided into two chairs:
    - Zoology (Mammals and Birds)
      - 1794 to 1841: Étienne Geoffroy Saint-Hilaire
      - 1841 to 1861: Isidore Geoffroy Saint-Hilaire
      - 1862 to 1876: Henri Milne Edwards
      - 1876 to 1900: Alphonse Milne-Edwards
      - 1900 to 1906: Émile Oustalet
      - 1906 to 1926: Édouard Trouessart
      - 1926 to 1947: Édouard Bourdelle
      - 1948: unknown
      - 1949 to 1962: Jacques Berlioz
      - 1963: not assigned
      - 1964 to 1985: Jean Dorst
      - 1985 to 2001: not assigned
    - Zoology (Reptiles and Fish)
      - 1795 to 1825: Bernard Germain Étienne de Laville-sur-Illon, comte de Lacépède. (N.b. 1825 is the year of Lacépède's death, but actually Duméril replaced him in the chair of zoology as early as 1803 because Lacépède, who was occupied with his political appointments, relinquished his professorship.
      - 1825 to 1857: André Marie Constant Duméril
      - 1857 to 1870: Auguste Duméril
      - 1870 to 1875: Émile Blanchard (who held the chair during a period of transition)
      - 1875 to 1909: Léon Vaillant
      - 1910 to 1937: Louis Roule
      - 1937 to 1943: Jacques Pellegrin
      - 1944 to 1956: Léon Bertin
      - 1957 to 1975: Jean Guibé. This chair was subdivided: The fish were transferred to the chair of Dynamics of Aquatic Populations and became the chair of General and Applied Ichthyology. This chair was then renamed Zoology (Reptiles and Amphibians).
        - Zoology (Reptiles and Amphibians)
          - 1977 to 1998: Édouard-Raoul Brygoo
          - 1998 to 2001: not assigned
        - Dynamics of Aquatic Populations
          - 1975: Jacques Daget. This chair was renamed General and Applied Ichthyology.
            - General and Applied Ichthyology
              - 1976 to 1984: Jacques Daget
              - 1985 to 2001: Marie-Louise Bauchot (de facto in office although not officially recognised)

Zoology (Insects, Worms and Microscopic Animals)

  - 1793 to 1829: Jean-Baptist de Lamarck. With his death, this chair was subdivided into two chairs:
    - Natural History of Shellfish, Arachnids and the Insects or Articulated Animals
      - 1830 to 1833: Pierre André Latreille
      - 1833 to 1841: Victor Audouin
      - 1841 to 1862: Henri Milne Edwards
      - 1864 to 1894: Émile Blanchard
      - 1895 to 1917: Eugène Louis Bouvier. This chair is then restricted to only insects and is renamed Entomology.
        - Entomology
          - 1917 to 1931: Eugène Louis Bouvier
          - 1931 to 1950: René Jeannel
          - 1951 to 1955: Lucien Chopard
          - 1956 to 1960: Eugène Séguy
          - 1961: unknown
          - 1962 to 1963: Alfred Balachowsky. This chair is renamed General and Applied Entomology.
            - General and Applied Entomology
              - 1963 to 1974: Alfred Balachowsky
              - 1975 to 1987: Jacques Carayon
              - 1987 to 2000: Claude Caussanel
              - 2000 to 2001: Loïc Matile
    - Natural History of Mollusks, Worms and Zoophytes
      - 1830 to 1832: Henri Marie Ducrotay de Blainville
      - 1832 to 1865: Achille Valenciennes
      - 1865 to 1869: Henri de Lacaze-Duthiers
      - 1869 to 1875: Gérard Paul Deshayes
      - 1876 to 1903: Edmond Perrier
      - 1903 to 1917: Louis Joubin. This chair is then restricted to mollusks and zoophytes is renamed Malacology.
        - Malacology
          - 1917 to 1935: Louis Joubin
          - 1935 to 1942: Louis Germain
          - 1943 to 1970: Édouard Fischer-Piette. This chair is then attached to that of Biology of Marine Invertebrates.
            - Biology of Marine Invertebrates
              - 1966 to 2001: Claude Lévi
    - Zoology (Worms and Crustaceans)
      - 1917 to 1937: Charles Gravier
      - 1938 to 1954: Louis Fage
      - 1955 to 1955: Max Vachon. The worms were separated from the arthropods. The chair of Zoology (Arthropods) was then created.
        - Zoology (Worms)
          - 1960 to 1990: Alain Chabaud
        - Zoology (Arthropods)
          - 1960 to 1978: Max Vachon
          - 1979 to 2001: Yves Coineau
- Entomology of Colonial Agriculture
  - 1942 to 1958 Paul Vayssière. This chair was then renamed Entomology of Tropical Agriculture.
    - Entomology of Tropical Agriculture
      - 1958 to 1960 Paul Vayssière. This chair was then removed.
- Mineralogy
  - 1793 to 1800: Louis Jean-Marie Daubenton
  - 1800 to 1802: Déodat Gratet de Dolomieu
  - 1802 to 1822: René Just Haüy
  - 1822 to 1847: Alexandre Brongniart
  - 1847 to 1857: Armand Dufrénoy
  - 1857 to 1876: Gabriel Delafosse
  - 1876 to 1892: Alfred Des Cloizeaux
  - 1893 to 1936: Alfred Lacroix
  - 1937 to 1967: Jean Orcel
  - 1968 to 1980: Jacques Fabriès
  - 1980 to 2001: not assigned
- Geology
  - 1793 to 1819: Barthélemy Faujas de Saint-Fond
  - 1819 to 1861: Louis Cordier
  - 1861 to 1891: Auguste Daubrée
  - 1892 to 1919: Stanislas-Étienne Meunier
  - 1920: unknown
  - 1921 to 1940: Paul Lemoine
  - 1941 to 1962: René Abrard
  - 1963 to 1980: Robert Laffitte
  - 1980 to 2001: Lucien Leclaire
- Physics as Applied to the Natural Sciences
  - 1838 to 1877: Antoine-César Becquerel
  - 1878 to 1891: Edmond Becquerel
  - 1892 to 1908: Henri Becquerel
  - 1909 to 1948: Jean Becquerel
  - 1949 to 1977: Yves Le Grand. This chair was then combined with the chair of Physical-Chemistry of Biological Adaptation.
- Natural Iconography or the Art of Drawing and Painting all the Things of Nature
  - 1793 to 1822 Gérard van Spaendonck. This chair is then removed.
