= Seguyola vicina =

Scientific classification
- Domain: Eukaryota
- Kingdom: Animalia
- Phylum: Arthropoda
- Class: Insecta
- Order: Diptera
- Family: Keroplatidae
- Genus: Seguyola
- Species: S. vicina

Binomial name
- Seguyola vicina (Loïc Matile, 1990)

Species of fly

Seguyola vicina is a species of fungus gnat, first described by Loïc Matile in 1990, of the family Lygistorrhinidae. Its type locality is in Cameroon. There are no subspecies.
