= Yseult Le Danois =

French zoologist

Yseult Le Danois was a marine biologist focusing on ichthyology and comparative anatomy including work in osteology and myology. Her work led her to classifying the phylogenies of species and suborders. She clarified the phylogony of frogfish and the suborder Scombers. She discovered many other species including Chirolophius monodi, the family Protobraidae and the genus Proaracana.

== Biography ==
Yseult Le Danois was born on September 8, 1920 and died on September 3, 1985. She was the daughter of Édouard Le Danois. Édouard was the director of the Scientific and Technical Office of Maritime Fisheries and a collaborator at the Oceanographic Institute. Le Danois followed her father's footsteps by obtaining her master's degree in natural science at the University of Paris. Le Danois then thirteen years later in 1958 defended her doctoral thesis at the Scientific and Technical Office of Maritime Fisheries. Her proposal included listing a new suborder of the Orbiculates which is within the order of Plectognates. Her original method of reconsidering phylogenesis came from anatomical adaptation primarily the synapomorphic evolution of skeleton and musculature structures that provide support for the fish. A contestment to her methods was that within the order of Plectognates, Cuvier should be the only suborder of the Tetraodontiformes. Le Danois's methods were then accepted by fellow ichthyologists in 1974.

Once Le Danois obtained her doctorate, she joined the National Center for Scientific Research and was assigned as a research fellow in the Labroratory of General and Applied Ichthyology of the Museum of Natural History. In 1962 she was awarded the Jules Richard scholarship from the Oceanographic Institute of Paris. She collaborated with Théodore Monod. She followed her father's ideaologies to not conform to the previously established classifications. Le Danois took her non-conformist vision to question classifications like the Fowlerichthys ocellatus.

She worked with the municipal museum of Saint-German-en-Laye. While there she was asked by her professor Pierre-Paul Grassé to contribute to the encyclopedia of Traité de zoologie.

In 1972, Le Danois was promoted to a research director at the Laboratory of General and Applied Ichthyology. In 1976 she was involved in the founding of the French Ichthyological Society which grew from the 1889 founded Central Aquaculture Society of France. She served as the treasurer of the society. She worked with colleague and friend Béatrice Appia to revive a project that Le Danois's father had started. Her great-grandfather on her mother's side Alexis Muston a Vaudois theologian, had begain a transcript for publication. The transcript was picked up by Le Danois's father and eventually Le Danois and Béatrice.

Le Danois was diagnosed with cancer in 1981. While she was battling the disease she was focused on completing the transcript for publication. She died six years after her primary diagnosis and was not able to publish the work.

== Publications & Artwork ==
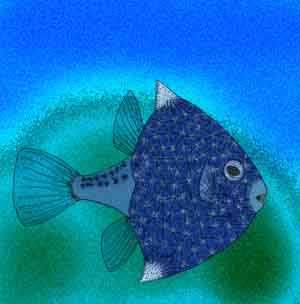
Drawing of a Proaracana dubia, a fossil species from at Monte Bolca found and painted by Yseult Le Danois in 1969.

Le Danois, Yseult. Étude anatomique et systématique des Antennaires, de l'ordre des Pédiculates. Muséum, 1964.

- A study of three different Antennariidae in the Red Sea in the Dahlak Islands and the Gulf of Aqaba. The article discusses Antermarius chlorostygma which Le Danois found for the second time since 1837, Antennarius immaculatus which was a newly discovered species, and Uniantennatus caudimaculatus to share how rich the fauna is in the Red Sea.

Le Danois, Yseult. Étude ostéo-myologique et révision systématique de la famille des Lophiidae (pédiculates haploptérygiens). Vol. 91. Éditions du Muséum, 1974.

- A systematic review and study of the family Lophiidae through a study of the musculoskeletal system of the formally known Haplopterygian or Pediculates fish groups.

Le Danois, Yseult. Étude ostéologique, myologique et systématique des poissons du sous-ordre des orbiculates. Masson, 1959.

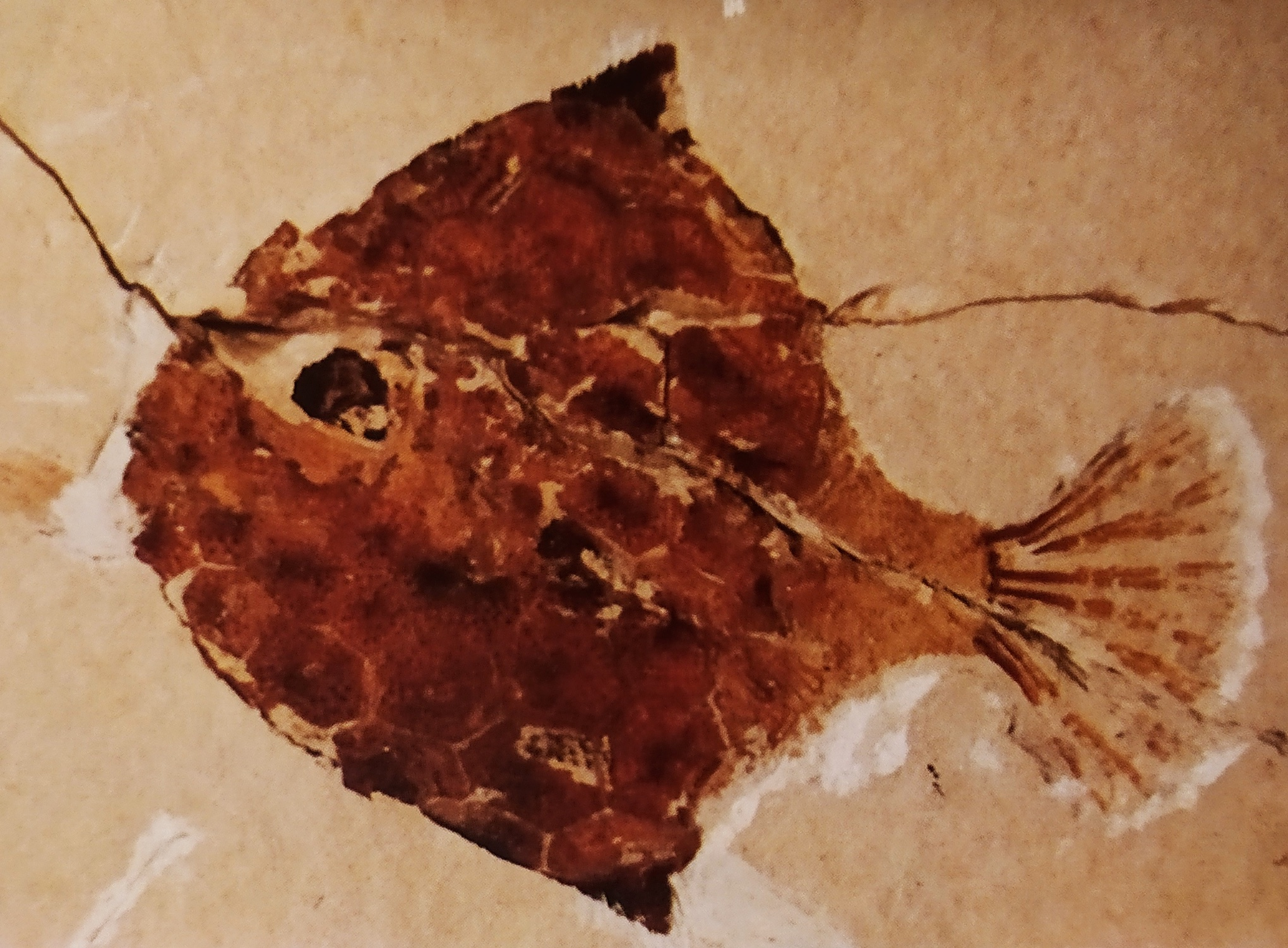
Photograph of the Proaracana dubia fossil found and described by Yseult Le Danois.

- A comprehensive study of the fish's anatomical and systematic structures to create the suborder Orbiculates. The study was performed by using osteological and myological structures. Gives structural characteristics of the species within the Plectognathi/Tetraodontiformes families.

Le Danois, Yseult. "Etude myologique du Saint-Pierre ou poule de mer (Zeus laber LINNE)." Revue des Travaux de l'Institut des Pêches Maritimes 24.2 (1960): 304-323.

- A study confirming the taxonomic position of the John Dory (Zeus laber). Classification changes were made based on muscular structure.

Le Danois, Yseult. "Étude sur des poissons pediculates de la famille des Antennariidae recoltés dans la mer Rouge et description d'une espèce nouvelle." Israel Journal of Zoology 19.2 (1970): 83-94.

- An explanation Antennariidae species in the Dahlak Islands and the Gulf of Aqaba. Includes the discovery of Antennarius immaculatus along with descriptions of seven other Antennariidae species.

Le Danois, Yseult. "La famille des Lophiidae(Poissons Pediculates Haplopterygiens) et sa repartition geographique." Bull. Mus. Natl. Hist. Nat. Ser 3 (1973): 261-270.

- A review of the Lophiidae family including pédiculates haploptérygiens which is a phylogenetic grouping created by Le Danois. The articles includes a geographical distribution of Lophiidae globally.

Le Danois, Yseult. "Poissons Pédiculates Haploptérygiens: Lophiidae et Chaunacidae." (1981).

- An explanation of Pediculala, Lophiidae, and Chaunacidae species collected during the Musorstom expedition. It includes the discovery of the genus Chaunax.

Le Danois, Yseult. Remarques sur les poissons Orbiculates du sous-ordre des Ostracioniformes. Éditions du Muséum, 1961.

- Work further explaining Orbiculates within the suborder Ostracioniformes. Includes descriptions of anatomical characteristics, muscular and skeletal anatomy to confirm their placement within the Ostracioniformes suborder.

Le Danois, Yseult. "Résultats des campagnes MUSORSTOM: 1: Philippines (18-28 mars 1976)." (1981).

- A description of Lophiidae and Chaunacidae species collected during the MUSORSTOM campaign. Includes descriptions of six species including a new one in the genus Chaunacidae.

Le Danois, Yseult. "Remarques sur l’ostéologie et la myologie d’un poisson de l’ordre des Jugulaires Batrachus didactylus (Bl. Schn.)(poisson-crapaud ou toad-fish)." Bulletin de l'Institut Français d'Afrique Noire 23 (1961): 806-854.

- A detailed description of the osteology and myology of the Batrachus didactylus species. This study is a part of her broader research on the anatomy of various fish species.

Monod, Théodore, and Yseult Le Danois. "Anatomie Fonctionnelle de la Région Préorbitaire, du Poisson Cobitide Botia macracanthus BLEEKER." Japanese Journal of Ichthyology 13.4-6 (1966): 127-144.

- A description of a new species Botia macracanthus and one other species in Cobitidae family. Includes an explanation of phylogony placement and species within the family. Includes contributions from other scientists studying fish with or without erectile spines as a genetic marker.
