= Henri Stehlé =

French agronomist, botanist and ecologist (1909–1983)

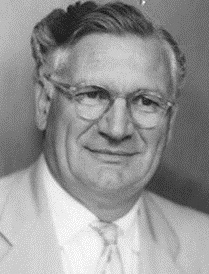
- Stehlé in 1952
- Born: 30 November 1909; Fécamp (France)
- Died: 19 February 1983 (aged 73); Palma de Majorca (Spain)
- Known for: Founder and Director of the Research Center of INRA Antilles-Guyane; Specialist of orchid flora in the Caribbean
- Scientific career
- Fields: Agronomy, Botany
- Author abbrev. (botany): Stehlé

Henri Stehlé (November 30, 1909 – February 19, 1983) was a French agronomist, botanist and ecologist specialized in tropical agriculture. In 1949 he founded the Agronomic Research Center of INRA Antilles-Guyane in Guadeloupe (French Antilles), of which he was Director until 1964. As botanist he worked mainly in Guadeloupe and Martinique in collaboration with his wife, Madeleine Stehlé, and Reverend Father Louis Quentin. Stehlé focused his work on two plant families: Orchidaceae and Piperaceae. The abbreviation Stehlé is used to indicate Henry Stehlé as the authority for many plant names.

== Education ==
Stehlé completed his agronomic engineering training at the École Nationale Supérieure d'Agronomie de Grignon in 1931, and then specialized in tropical agriculture at the École Nationale Supérieure d’Agriculture Coloniale. In 1947 Stehlé completed his PhD thesis on the phytogeography of the forest types in the Caribbean, at the Université de Montpellier, which earned him the prize of the Institut de France.

== Career ==
Stehlé served as Director of the Experimental Gardens of Guadeloupe (1934-1938) and Martinique (1938-1946), and established the Schools of Agriculture in these French departments. During this period he collaborated with the New York Botanical Garden and the National Museum of Natural History of United States.

At the beginning of the 1940's, Stehlé published two articles in Tropiques, the literary review founded and edited by the Martinican poet Aimé Césaire: "La végétation des Antilles françaises" (1941), and "Les dénominations génériques des végétaux aux Antilles françaises: histoires et légendes qui s'y attachent" (1944). Césaire pointed out that his aim for including these botanic contributions in a literary review was to familiarize Martinicans with their natural environment.

Following the foundation of the INRA Antilles-Guyane in 1949, he worked on the control of soil erosion, the characterization and conservation of local plant resources, and the improvement of farming practices in several cropping systems (vanilla, coffee, cassava, forage legumes). Stehlé realized numerous studies in the Caribbean, Central and South America, and represented the INRA in several FAO sessions as specialist in tropical agriculture.

After his return to France in 1964 Stehlé worked as Senior Researcher at the INRA Antibes, where he continued his botanical studies in particular on the characterization of exotic plants of the Thiuret Botanical Garden. He was also Director of the National Parks of Port-Cros and Mercantour in Southern France, and founded the Association SOS Life-Nature-Environment, for the protection of fauna, flora and the environment.

At the time of his death in 1983, Stehlé was working to complete his last work Histoire botanique, écologique et agricole des Antilles françaises, des Caraïbes à nos jours.

== Pioneer of the ecological approach in the Caribbean ==
During his agronomic training Stehlé was greatly influenced by Georges Kuhnholtz-Lordat, who was one of the founder of the Phytogeography in France and developed a robust ecological approach to the study of forest lands. Stehlé applied extensively these approaches in the Caribbean, and this since the beginning of his career. Thus, his first study in French Antilles published in 1935, on the ecology and botanical geography of Guadeloupe flora, was prefaced by Kuhnholtz-Lordat, who underlined the relevance of the applied approach. Lucien Degras, Stehlé's successor in 1964 at the INRA Plant Improvement Station, pointed out that this publication highlights a key issue in Sthele's studies: the link between botany, ecology and phytosociology. Degras also stressed that Stehlé was a pioneer in the use of biological methods for crop protection, publishing his first article on the subject in 1935.

In his agronomic works of the 1940s and 1950s, Stehlé continued to apply an ecological approach to analyze the relationships between the functioning of species of food interest, their pedoclimatic environment, and the farming practices aimed to prevent soil degradation.

Stehlé was one of the initiators of the project to establish a nature reserve in Guadeloupe, which will lead after his death to the creation of the Guadeloupe National Park.

== Prizes and distinctions ==
- 1931: Prize of Chimie of the École Nationale d'Agriculture.
- 1936: Prize of the Institut de France (Académie de Sciences).
- 1938: Prize Jules Crevaux of the Société de Géographie Commerciale de Paris.
- 1939: Prize Gandoger of the Société Botanique de France.
- 1946: Ordre des Palmas Académiques.
- 1947: Chevalier de l’Ordre de l'Étoile Noire of Bénin.
- 1949: Order of Agricultural Merit.
- 1949: Prize Coincy of the Société Botanique de France, with Madeleine Stehlé and Louis Quentin.

== Selected publications ==
- 1936: Flore de la Guadeloupe et Dépendances. Essai d'Écologie et de géographie botanique. Tome 1. 286 p. Ed. Basse-Terre.
- 1939: Flore descriptive des Antilles françaises: les Orchidiales. 144 p. Imprimerie officielle de la Martinique.
- 1941: The flora of Martinique. J. New York Bot. Gard. 42, 235–244.
- 1947: La végétation sylvatique de l'archipel caraïbe. PhD thesis. Université de Montpellier (Faculté des sciences). 548 p.
- 1946: Notes taxonomiques et écologiques sur les Légumineuses Papillionacées des Antilles françaises. Bull. Museum XVIII (1), 98–117.
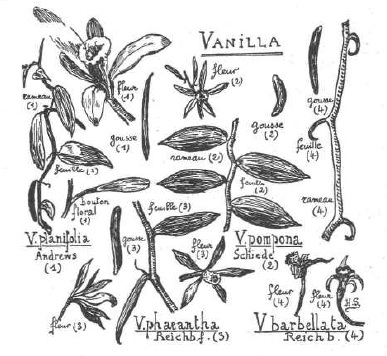
- Vanilla by Henri Stehlé (1952)
  1952: Le Vanillier et sa culture: I. Histoire, botanique, géographie et écologie du Vanillier. Rev. Fruits & Fruits d'Outre-Mer 7 (2), 50–56.
- 1954: Quelques notes sur la Botanique et l'Écologie végétale de l'Archipel des Caraïbes. J. Agricult. Trop. Bot. Appl. 1 (1–4), 71–110.
- 1956: Survey of forage crops in the Caribbean. 389 p. Ed. Trinidad.
- 1958: Une Excursion à La Soufrière (La Guadeloupe) (with Madeleine Stehlé). 86 p. Ed. Artra.
- 1962: Flore médicinale an tan lontan (with Madeleine Sthelé). Ed. Desormeaux.
- 1966: Quelques mises au point historiques relatives à l’introduction de végétaux économiques aux Antilles françaises. Bull. Société d'Histoire de la Guadeloupe (5–6), 27–37.
- 1978: Essai d'écologie et de géographie botanique. 282 p. Ed. Calivran.
