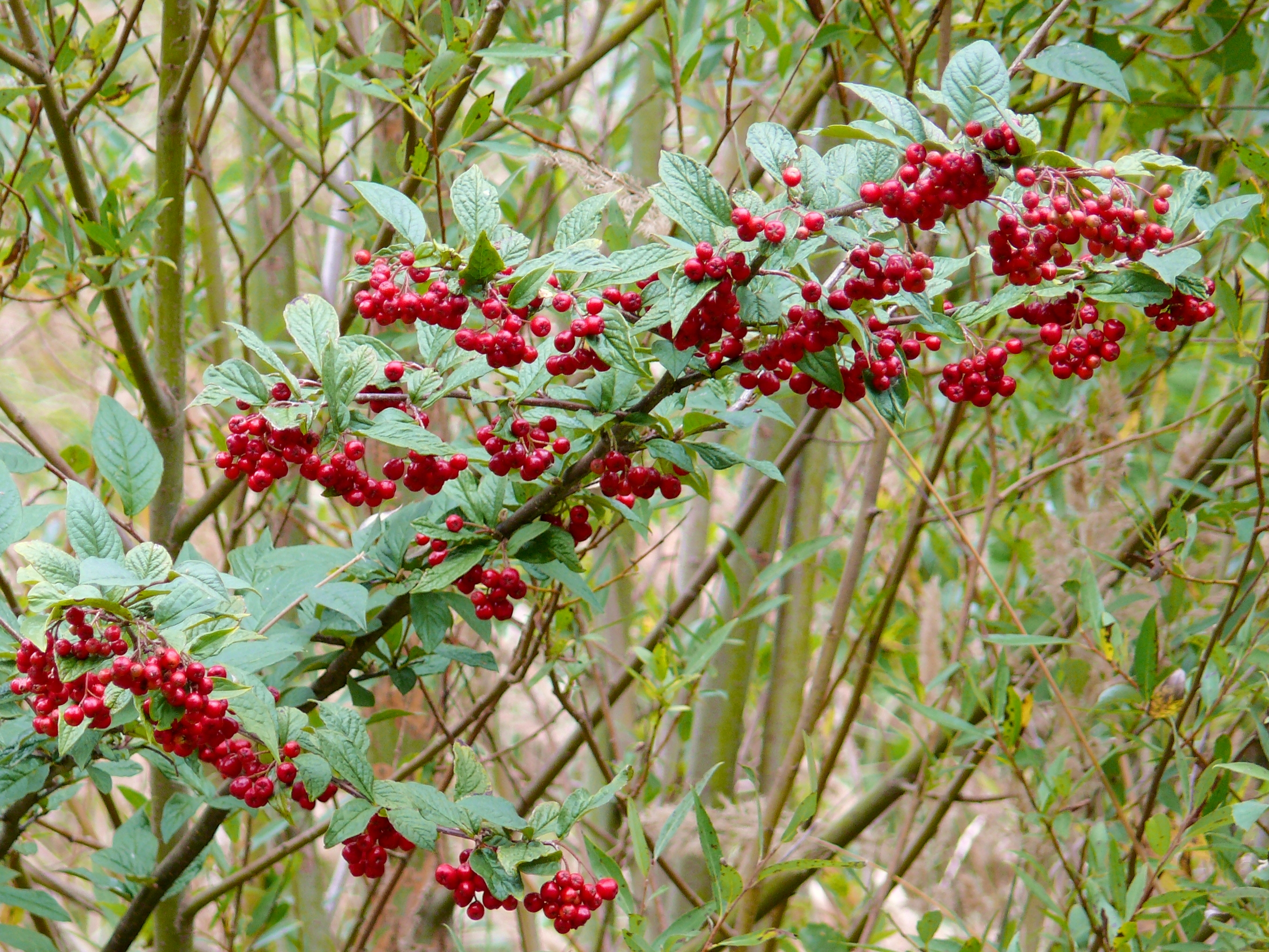
- Hollyberry cotoneaster - Cotoneaster bullatus foliage and fruit

Scientific classification
- Kingdom: Plantae
- Clade: Tracheophytes
- Clade: Angiosperms
- Clade: Eudicots
- Clade: Rosids
- Order: Rosales
- Family: Rosaceae
- Genus: Cotoneaster
- Species: C. bullatus

Binomial name
- Cotoneaster bullatus Bois

= Cotoneaster bullatus =

Species of flowering plant

Cotoneaster bullatus, the hollyberry cotoneaster, is a species of shrub in the genus Cotoneaster within the rose family. Its natural range is in Western China (provinces of Hubei, Sichuan, Xizang, and Yunnan), where it is found in a range of woodland and shrub biotopes from 900 to 3200 m above sea level.

The plant was introduced into cultivation 1898, and is widely naturalised in Europe, New Zealand and possibly British Columbia in North America (although this is now considered to be the closely related C. rehderi, which was formerly treated as a variety of this species, C. bullatus var macrophylla).

== Description ==
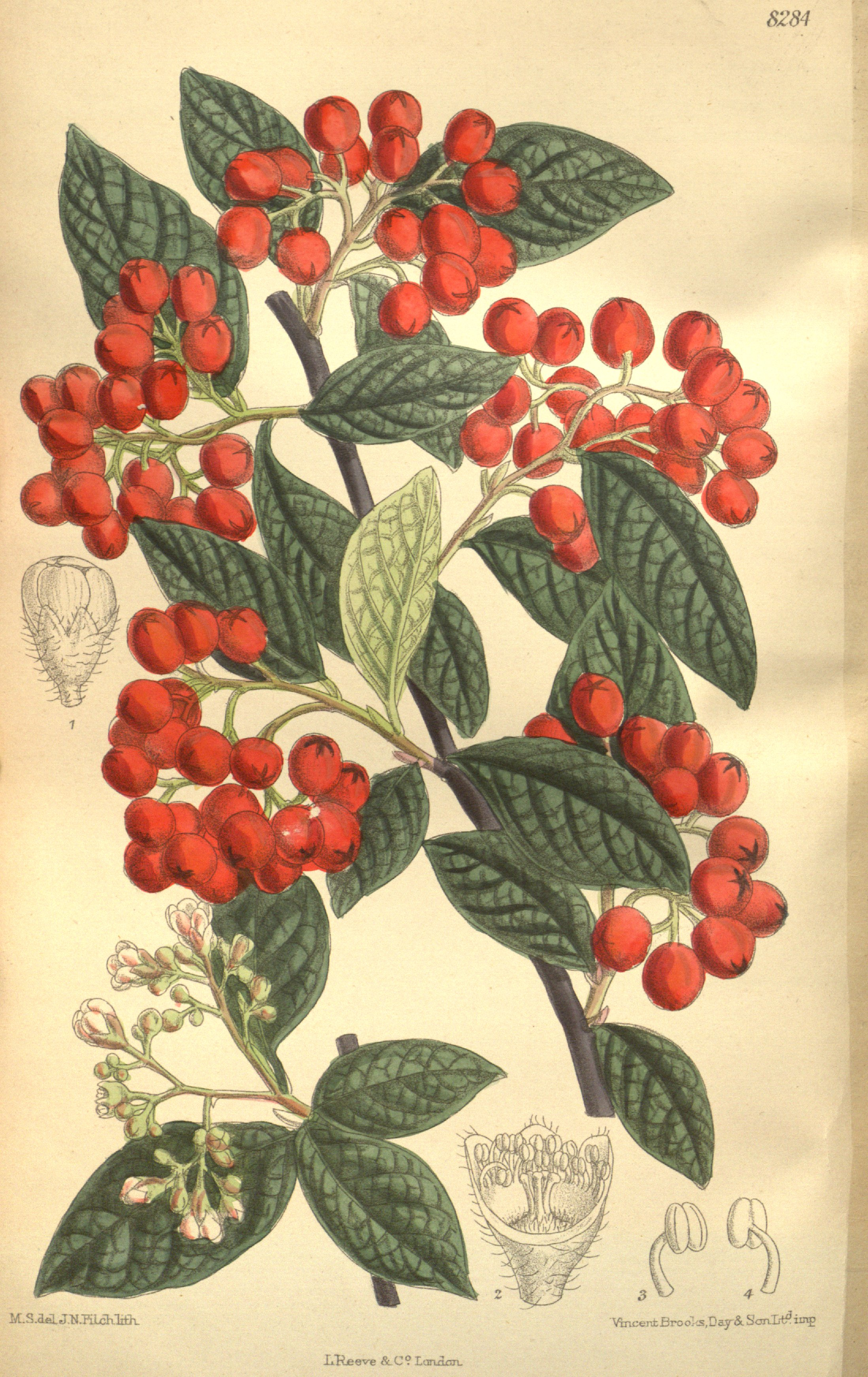
Illustration of Cotoneaster bullatus var. floribundus

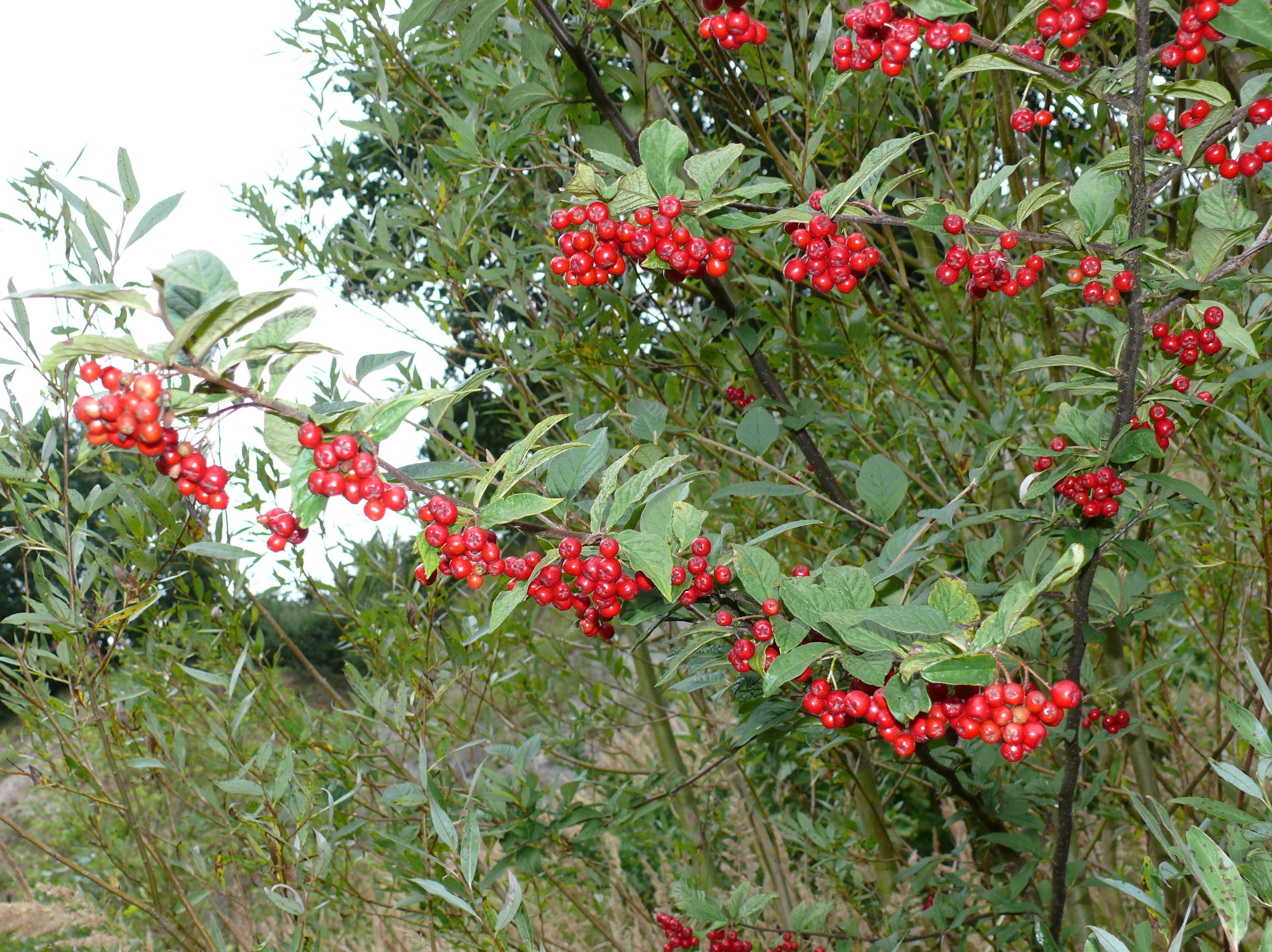
Twig with leaves and ripe fruit

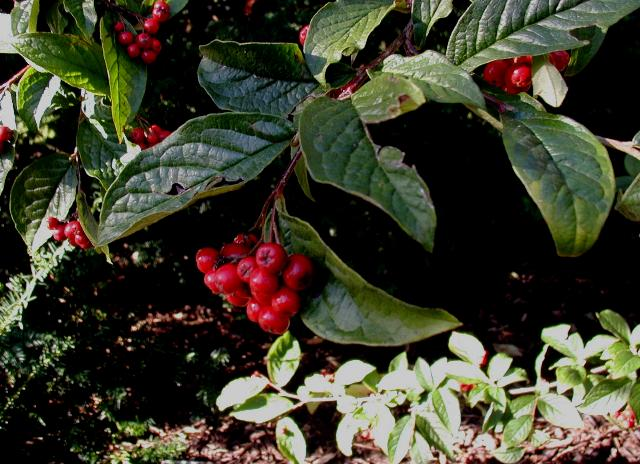
Leaves and fruit

=== Vegetative features ===
Hollyberry cotoneaster is an arching deciduous shrub, which grows to heights of 3–4 metres. Branches are terete with grey bark, and alternate leaves. Twigs are initially hairy, but lose the hairs to become glabrous at maturity.

The simple leaves have a short petiole (4–6 mm), which is usually hairless, and an oblong-ovate blade, usually 35–70 mm long and 20–40 mm wide. The upper leaf surface is dark green, wrinkled and blistered (bullate, glabrous or finely hairy; the underside is grey-green, finely hairy, especially along the secondary veins. Leaves have lanceolate stipules, 3–5 mm long, which fall soon after the leaves open.

=== Flowers and fruit ===
Flowers are grouped in corymbose inflorescence about 30–50 mm across, containing from 12 to 30 white flowers. The flowers themselves have five petals and five sepals, and are 7–8 mm in diameter. They have from 20 to 22 stamens and four or five free styles. Flowering time in the Northern Hemisphere is from May–July.

The globose fruits mature in August. They are 6–8 mm in diameter, red and contain four or five pyrenes.

== Bibliography ==
- Gines López González (2006). Los árboles y arbustos de la Península Ibérica e Islas Baleares: especies silvestres y las principales cultivadas. Mundi-Prensa Libros. p. 784. ISBN 978-84-8476-272-0.
- "Cotoneaster bullatus (Hollyberry Cotoneaster)".
- Zhi-Yun Zhang; Hongda Zhang; Peter K. Endress. Flora of China. Vol. 9. p. 99. ISBN 1930723148.
- Andreas Roloff; Andreas Bärtels (2008). Flora der Gehölze. Stuttgart (Hohenheim): Ulmer. p. 228. ISBN 978-3-8001-5614-6.
- "Cotoneaster bullatus". Royal Horticultural Society.
- Jeanette Fryer; Bertil Hylmö (2009). Cotoneasters: A Comprehensive Guide to Shrubs for Flowers, Fruit, and Foliage. Timber Press. ISBN 978-0-88192-927-0.
- "Cotoneaster bullatus Bois". GBIF.
