= Phronia riparia =

Scientific classification
- Kingdom: Animalia
- Phylum: Arthropoda
- Class: Insecta
- Order: Diptera
- Family: Mycetophilidae
- Genus: Phronia
- Species: P. riparia

Binomial name
- Phronia riparia Matile, 1979

Species of fly

Phronia riparia is a species of fly. It was first described by Loïc Matile in 1979. Phronia riparia belongs to the genus Phronia and the family Mycetophilidae.

This species is native to the Comoro Islands.
