= Lygistorrhina sanctaecatharinae =

Scientific classification
- Domain: Eukaryota
- Kingdom: Animalia
- Phylum: Arthropoda
- Class: Insecta
- Order: Diptera
- Family: Keroplatidae
- Genus: Lygistorrhina
- Species: L. sanctaecatharinae

Binomial name
- Lygistorrhina sanctaecatharinae Thompson, 1975

Species of fly

Lygistorrhina sanctaecatharinae is a species of long-beaked fungus gnat in the family Lygistorrhinidae. It is found in North America.
