= Seguyola =

Scientific classification
- Domain: Eukaryota
- Kingdom: Animalia
- Phylum: Arthropoda
- Class: Insecta
- Order: Diptera
- Family: Keroplatidae
- Subfamily: Lygistorrhininae
- Genus: Seguyola; Matile, 1990

Type species
- Seguyola variegata Matile, 1990

Genus of flies

Seguyola is a genus of long-beaked fungus gnats in the family Lygistorrhinidae.

== Species ==
- S. variegata Matile, 1990
- S. vicina Matile, 1990
