= Blagorrhina =

Scientific classification
- Domain: Eukaryota
- Kingdom: Animalia
- Phylum: Arthropoda
- Class: Insecta
- Order: Diptera
- Family: Keroplatidae
- Subfamily: Lygistorrhininae
- Genus: Blagorrhina; Hippa, Mattsson & Vilkamaa, 2005

Type species
- Blagorrhina blagoderovi Hippa, Mattsson & Vilkamaa, 2005

Genus of flies

Blagorrhina is a genus of long-beaked fungus gnats in the family Lygistorrhinidae.

== Species ==
- B. blagoderovi Hippa, Mattsson & Vilkamaa, 2005
- B. brevicornis Hippa, Mattsson & Vilkamaa, 2005
