= Probolaeus =

Scientific classification
- Domain: Eukaryota
- Kingdom: Animalia
- Phylum: Arthropoda
- Class: Insecta
- Order: Diptera
- Family: Keroplatidae
- Subfamily: Lygistorrhininae
- Genus: Probolaeus; Williston, 1896

Type species
- Probolaeus singularis Williston, 1896

Genus of flies

Probolaeus is a genus of long-beaked fungus gnats in the family Lygistorrhinidae.

== Species ==
- P. alexi (Huerta & Ibañez-Bernal, 2008)
- P. barrettoi (Lane, 1946)
- P. borkenti (Huerta & Ibañez-Bernal, 2008)
- P. brasiliensis (Edwards, 1932)
- P. cerquerai (Lane, 1958)
- P. edwardsi (Lane, 1946)
- P. singularis Williston, 1896
- P. urichi (Edwards, 1912)
