= Matileola =

Scientific classification
- Domain: Eukaryota
- Kingdom: Animalia
- Phylum: Arthropoda
- Class: Insecta
- Order: Diptera
- Family: Keroplatidae
- Subfamily: Lygistorrhininae
- Genus: Matileola; Papp, 2002

Type species
- Matileola yangi Papp, 2002

Genus of flies

Matileola is a genus of long-beaked fungus gnats in the family Lygistorrhinidae.

== Species ==
- M. similis Papp, 2005
- M. thaii Papp, 2005
- M. yangi Papp, 2002
