= Neoplatyura =

Scientific classification
- Domain: Eukaryota
- Kingdom: Animalia
- Phylum: Arthropoda
- Class: Insecta
- Order: Diptera
- Family: Keroplatidae
- Tribe: Orfeliini
- Genus: Neoplatyura; Malloch, 1928

Genus of flies

Neoplatyura is a genus of flies belonging to the family Keroplatidae.

The species of this genus are found in Europe, Australia and Northern America.

== Species ==
- Neoplatyura anjouana Matile, 1979
- Neoplatyura annieae Matile, 1988
