= Georges Lemoine =

French chemist (1841–1922)

- Born: 16 January 1841; Tonnerre, France
- Died: 13 November 1922 (aged 81); Paris, France
- Citizenship: France
- Scientific career
- Fields: Chemistry, hydrology
- Thesis: Recherches sur l'action du phosphore rouge sur le soufre (1865)

Clément Georges Lemoine (16 January 1841 in Tonnerre – 13 November 1922 in Paris) was a French chemist and hydrologist. He was the father of geologist Paul Lemoine (1878–1940).

He studied at the École Polytechnique and the École des ponts et chaussées, obtaining a doctorate in physical sciences in 1865. For many years he was associated with the École Polytechnique in Paris, where he ultimately served as a professor of chemistry from 1898 to 1911.

In 1866 he began work as an engineer in charge of hydrometric services in the Seine Basin. In 1881 he was appointed chief engineer of bridges and roads, and in 1901, was named inspector general of bridges and roads. He is credited with organizing a flood warning service throughout France.

As a chemist he discovered phosphorus sesquisulfide, a compound that will later be used in the manufacture of matches. He continued research on the allotropic transformation of phosphorus, and was also the author of works on chemical equilibria.

In 1899 he became a member of the Académie des sciences (chemistry section), of which in 1921, he was named its president.

== Published works (selection) ==
- Recherches sur l'action du phosphore rouge sur le soufre, 1875 – Research on the action of red phosphorus on sulfur.
- Équilibres chimiques entre l'hydrogène et la vapeur d'iode, in Annales de chimie et de physique, 1877 – Chemical equilibria between hydrogen and iodine vapor.
- Étude sur les équilibres chimiques, in Encyclopédie chimique by Edmond Frémy, 1881 – Study on chemical equilibria.
- Dissociation du bromhydrate d'amylène sous de faibles pressions, in Comptes rendus de l'Académie des sciences (CRAS), 1891 – Dissociation in amylene hydrobromide under low pressure.
- L'action chimique de la lumière comparée à celle de la chaleur, in Revue scientifique, 1895 – Chemical action of light compared to that of heat.
- Décomposition de l'eau oxygénée sous l'influence de la chaleur, in Journal de chimie physique, 1914 – Decomposition of hydrogen peroxide under the influence of heat.
