= Léon Maquenne =

French chemist and plant physiologist

Léon-Gervais-Marie Maquenne (2 December 1853 – 10 January 1925) was a French chemist and plant physiologist born in Paris.

From 1871 he worked in the laboratory of agricultural chemistry at the Ecole d'agriculture in Grignon. Here, he was a student of Pierre Paul Dehérain (1830-1902). In 1883 he became préparateur at the Muséum national d'histoire naturelle, where from 1885 to 1898 he served as an assistant to the chair of Physiologie végétale. In 1898 he succeeded Georges Ville (1824-1897) as chair of Physique végétale, a position he held on to until 1925. In 1904 he became a member of the Académie des sciences.

Among Maquenne's contributions was research involving the chemical make-up of sugar alcohols. He was able to resolve the chemical constitution of inositol and demonstrated it to be a hexahydroxycyclohexane.

He is credited with invention of the so-called "Maquenne block", an apparatus used for determining the melting point of chemical compounds.

== Written works ==
- Les Sucres et principaux dérivés (1900, 1032 pages) – The sugars and their major derivatives.
- Précis de Physiologie végétale (1921) – Handbook of Plant Physiology.
