= Loyugesa =

Scientific classification
- Domain: Eukaryota
- Kingdom: Animalia
- Phylum: Arthropoda
- Class: Insecta
- Order: Diptera
- Family: Keroplatidae
- Subfamily: Lygistorrhininae
- Genus: Loyugesa; Grimaldi & Blagoderov, 2001

Type species
- Loyugesa khuati Grimaldi & Blagoderov, 2001

Genus of flies

Loyugesa is a genus of long-beaked fungus gnats in the family Lygistorrhinidae.

== Species ==
- Loyugesa khuati Matile, 1990
