= Lucie Thésée =

Surrealist poet

Lucie Thésée was a surrealist poet from the Antilles, who settled in Martinique and participated in the group around the Martinican cultural review Tropiques.

== Life ==
Little is known of Thésée's life. She appears to have originally come from the Antilles, and worked in Martinique as a schoolteacher. Her first poem for Tropiques, 'Beautiful As...', took Lautréamont's famous line "beautiful as the chance meeting on a dissecting-table of a sewing-machine and an umbrella" as its point of departure: "beautiful as a high frothing wave spurting into a crystal globe".

After the Vichy official Lieutenant Bayle refused to provide paper to Tropiques, accusing the review of being "revolutionary, racial and sectarian", Thésée was amongst the six signatories to the magazine's reply.

== Legacy ==
Léon Damas praised the "abundance and excellence of images" in Thésée's poetry in his 1947 Poètes d'expression française. Her poems have been repeatedly anthologised, and translated into English by Myrna Bell Rochester and Robert Archambeau. Christiane Taubira's 2018 book on literature, Baroque sarabande, recommended her work, and the reference to 'sarabande' in the title of Taubira's book may refer to the subject of a poem by Thésée.

== Works ==
- 'Beau comme...' [Beautiful As], Tropiques 5 (April 1942), pp.31-32. Translated by Robert Archambeau as Poem.
- 'Où va tomber la terre?' [Where Will the Earth Fall?], Tropiques 6-7 (February 1943), pp.34-36
- 'Poème' [Poem], Tropiques 8-9 (October 1943), pp.45-46.
- 'Preference' [Preference], Tropiques 10 (February 1944), pp. 37–38.
- 'Poème' [Poem], Tropiques 12 (January 1945), pp. 209-10
- ' Profonde allégresse' [Deep Joy], Tropiques 12 (January 1045), pp.211-213
