= Labellorrhina =

Scientific classification
- Kingdom: Animalia
- Phylum: Arthropoda
- Class: Insecta
- Order: Diptera
- Family: Keroplatidae
- Subfamily: Lygistorrhininae
- Genus: Labellorrhina; Hippa, Mattsson & Vilkamaa, 2005

Type species
- Labellorrhina quantula Hippa, Mattsson & Vilkamaa, 2005

Genus of flies

Labellorrhina is a genus of long-beaked fungus gnats in the family Lygistorrhinidae.

== Species ==
- L. grimaldii Hippa, Mattsson & Vilkamaa, 2005
- L. quantula Hippa, Mattsson & Vilkamaa, 2005
