= Paul Lemoine =

French geologist

Paul Lemoine (French pronunciation: [pɔl ləmwan]; March 28, 1878 – March 14, 1940) was a French geologist born in Paris. He was the son of chemist Georges Lemoine (1841-1922) and husband of phycologist Marie Lemoine (1887–1984).

== Career ==
In 1902-03 he conducted geological studies of northern Madagascar that included Diego Suarez. In 1904 he performed geological/exploratory investigations in Morocco. From 1908 to 1919 he was head of the Géologie au Laboratoire Colonial in Paris. During this time period he also taught classes in geology at the Ecole spéciale d'Architecture (1909-1920).

Following the retirement of Stanislas-Étienne Meunier (1843-1925), he was appointed chair of geology at the Muséum national d'histoire naturelle (1920). From 1932 to 1936 he was director of the museum.

In 1916 in collaboration with other scientists, he created the Société de Documentation Paléontologique, which later became known as the Syndicat de Documentation Géologique et Paléontologique. Lemoine was a member of the Académie des sciences, the Société de biogéographie, the Société française de minéralogie et de cristallographie and the Société géologique de France (its president in 1923 and 1936).

== Evolution ==
Lemoine has been cited in creationist literature as being anti-evolution. A quote often attributed to him from the Encyclopédie française (Volume 5, 1937) is:

"It results from this explanation that the theory of evolution is not exact ... Evolution is a kind of dogma which its own priests no longer believe, but which they uphold for the people. It is necessary to have the courage to state this if only so that men of a future generation may orient their research into a different direction."

It is suspected that the quote is taken out of context by creationists, as Lemoine was addressing how evolution occurred, not the fact of evolution itself.

== Written works ==
- Conférences sur Madagascar, 1904 (Lectures on Madagascar)
- Mission dans le Maroc occidental (automne 1904), 1905 (Mission in western Morocco; autumn 1904)
- Études géologiques dans le nord de Madagascar: Contributions à l'histoire géologique de l'océan indien, 1906 (Geological srudies of northern Madagascar, Contributions to the geological history of the Indian Ocean).
- Contributions à la géologie des colonies françaises, 1908–09.
- Géologie du bassin de Paris, 1911 (Geology of the Paris Basin)
- Excursion de la Société géologique de France à Vigny et à Meulan (Seine-et-Oise), le 17 mars 1912, sous la conduite de MM. G.-F. Dollfus et Paul Lemoine. Étude de la position stratigraphique du calcaire pisolithique, 1912.
- Afrique occidentale, 1913 (Western Africa).
- Volcans et tremblements de terre, 1928 (Volcanoes and earthquakes).
- Mon oeuvre au Muséum national d'histoire naturelle pendant cinq ans de direction. 1932-1936, 1936.
- Bibliographie des sciences géologiques, (Bibliography of geological sciences); published by the Geological Society of France with assistance from the French Society of Mineralogy ... Second set. Volume VIII (1937). Foreword by Paul Lemoine and R. Laffitte. [- Volume IX (1938). Foreword by R. Laffitte.
- Note:: He is not to be confused with Paul Lemoine, French pediatrician (1917-2006).
