= Lygistorrhina =

Scientific classification
- Domain: Eukaryota
- Kingdom: Animalia
- Phylum: Arthropoda
- Class: Insecta
- Order: Diptera
- Family: Keroplatidae
- Subfamily: Lygistorrhininae
- Genus: Lygistorrhina; Skuse, 1890

Type species
- Lygistorrhina insignis Skuse, 1890

Genus of flies

Lygistorrhina is a genus of long-beaked fungus gnats in the family Lygistorrhinidae. There are at least 20 described species in Lygistorrhina.

== Species ==
These 13 species belong to the genus Lygistorrhina:

- Lygistorrhina carayoni Matile, 1986^{c g}
- Lygistorrhina chaoi Papp, 2002^{c g}
- Lygistorrhina cinciticornis Edwards, 1926^{c g}
- Lygistorrhina edwardsina Grimaldi & Blagoderov, 2001^{c g}
- Lygistorrhina fijiensis Evenhuis, 2008^{c g}
- Lygistorrhina hamoni Matile, 1996^{c g}
- Lygistorrhina insignis Skuse, 1890^{c g}
- Lygistorrhina legrandi Matile, 1990^{c g}
- Lygistorrhina magna Matile, 1990^{c g}
- Lygistorrhina nassreddineri Matile, 1979^{c g}
- Lygistorrhina pentafida Papp, 2005^{c g}
- Lygistorrhina pictipennis Okada, 1937^{c g}
- Lygistorrhina sanctaecatharinae Thompson, 1975^{i c g b}

Data sources: i = ITIS, c = Catalogue of Life, g = GBIF, b = Bugguide.net
