= Pyratula =

Scientific classification
- Domain: Eukaryota
- Kingdom: Animalia
- Phylum: Arthropoda
- Class: Insecta
- Order: Diptera
- Family: Keroplatidae
- Genus: Pyratula; Edwards, 1929

Genus of flies

Pyratula is a genus of flies belonging to the family Keroplatidae.

The species of this genus are found in Europe.

Species:

- Pyratula alpicola Chandler & Blasco-Zumeta, 2001
- Pyratula canariae Chandler & Ribeiro, 1995
