= Étienne Serres =

French physician and biologist (1786–1868)

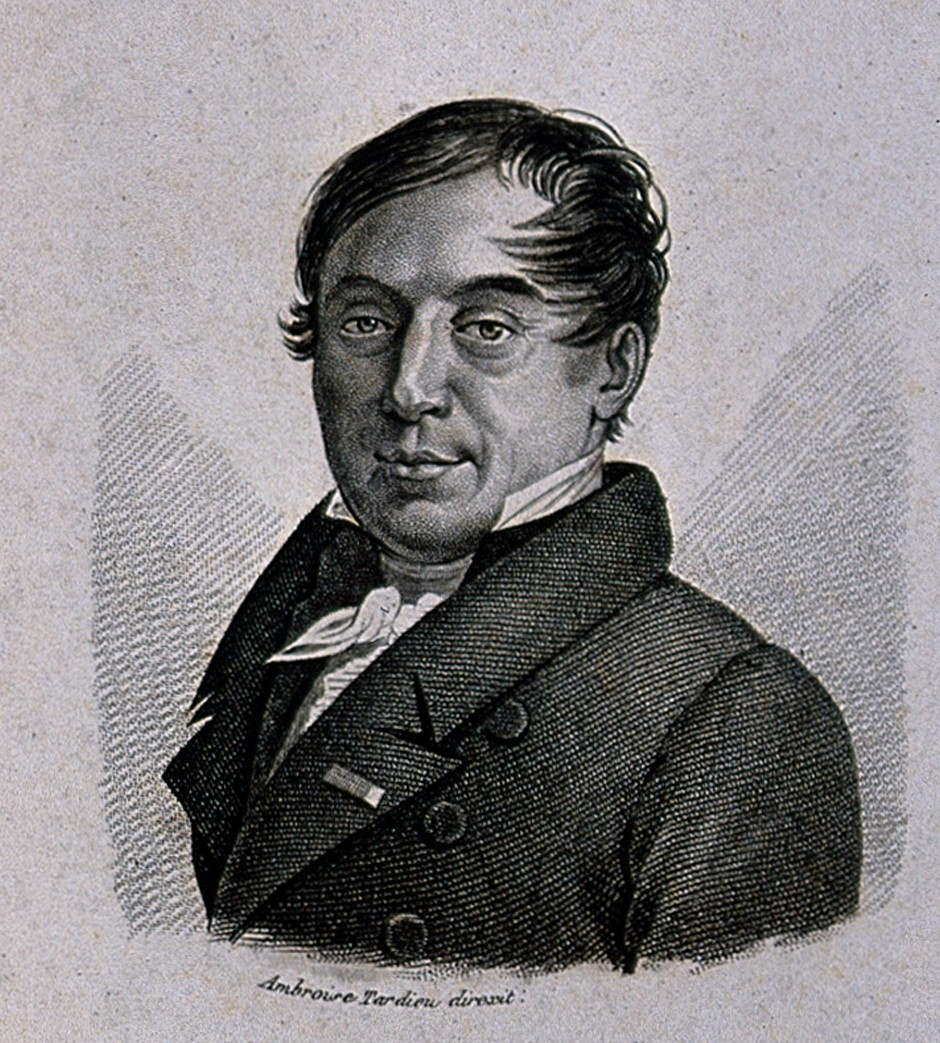
Antoine Étienne Renaud Augustin Serres

Antoine Étienne Renaud Augustin Serres (12 September 1786, Clairac – 22 January 1868, Paris) was a French medical doctor and embryologist. He has been considered a pioneer of neurology. He was among the first to formulate the recapitulation theory.

== Life and work ==
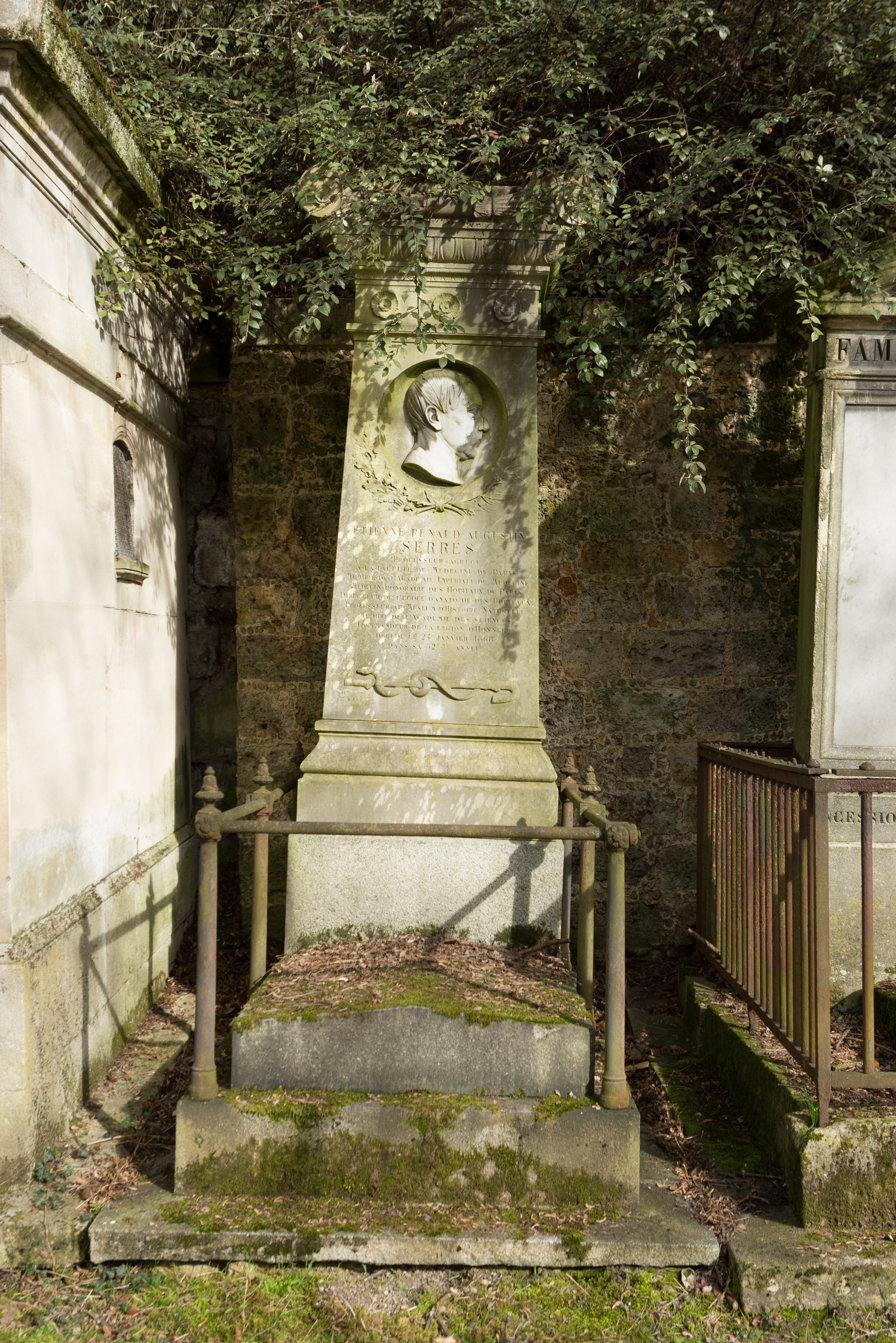
Père-Lachaise Cemetery.

Étienne Serres was the son of physician Jean Jacques Serres, "maître chirurgien" at Clairac and Marie Roussel. He followed a brother who died young in Paris to study medicine in 1803 and received his medical doctorate in 1808, second of eight students who completed their residentship. He defended a thesis titled Essai sur la certitude et l’incertitude en medecine (essay on certainty and uncertainty in medicine) in 1810 which was based on the ideas of Pierre Jean Georges Cabanis (1757–1808). During the Battle of Paris he was shot while treating patients. The bullet was not removed and he suffered from osteitis. He afterwards worked at the Hôtel-Dieu de Paris and the Hôpital de la Pitié where he became a chief physician in 1822. He was made chair of anatomy, successor to Pierre Flourens (1794–1864), in 1839 at the Muséum national d'histoire naturelle. In 1841, he was chosen president of the French Academy of Sciences. In 1865 he also became a professor of anthropology at the Muséum national d'histoire naturelle. Serres' scientific work was influenced by the theories of Lorenz Oken (1779–1851), Georges Cuvier (1769–1832), and especially Étienne Geoffroy Saint-Hilaire (1772–1844). He suffered from a pulmonary infection and died despite being treated by Auguste Nonat (1804–1887) and Pierre-Joseph Manec (1799–1884).

In 1817 he published an essay on human dentition (Essai sur l’anatomie et la physiologie des dents, nouvelle theorie de la dentition. In 1822 he examined intracerebellar haemorrhages. He became interested in neurological disorders and conducted vivisection experiments in pigeons, dogs, cows, and horses to induce paralysis and apoplexy. In 1857 he collaborated with Guillaume Duchenne de Boulogne (1806–1875) to examine the role of facial muscles through electrostimulation.

With German anatomist, Johann Friedrich Meckel (1781–1833), the supposed "Meckel-Serres Law" is obtained. This was a theory that attempted to provide a link between comparative embryology and a "pattern of unification" in the organic world. It was based on a belief that within the entire animal kingdom there was a single unified body-type, and that during development, the organs of higher animals matched the forms of comparable organs in lower animals. This theory applied to both vertebrates and invertebrates, and also stated that higher animals go through embryological stages analogous to the adult stages of lower life-forms in the course of their development, a version of the recapitulation theory later ossified in the statement "Ontogeny recapitulates phylogeny" of Ernst Haeckel.

In the field of teratology, Serres explained the presence of malformations as cases of arrested development or over-development. He had disagreements with Charles Darwin regarding the latter's evolutionary theories. Serres believed that humans were creatures set apart and a supreme goal of all creation.

== Associated eponyms ==
- Serres' angle: Also known as the metafacial angle, an angle between the base of the skull and the pterygoid process.
- Serres' glands: Epithelial cell rests found in the subepithelial connective tissue in the palate of the newborn.

== Selected writings ==
- Essai sur l'anatomie et la physiologie des dents, ou Nouvelle théorie de la dentition, 1817 - Essay on the anatomy and physiology of the teeth, or a new theory about dentition.
- Anatomie comparée du cerveau, dans les quatre classes des animaux vertébrés, appliquée à la physiologie et à la pathologie du système nerveux, 1824-1827 - Comparative anatomy of the brain, in the four classes of vertebrates, as it applies to the physiology and pathology of the nervous system.
- Principes d'embryogénie, de zoogénie et de tératogénie, 1859 - Principles of embryology, zoology and teratology.

== See also ==
- List of Chairs of the Muséum national d'histoire naturelle

== Other sources ==
- Form and Function a Contribution to the History of Animal Morphology By E. S. Russell. Russell was an “unabashed vitalist” who both rejected and misrepresented the Darwinian formulation of recapitulation defended by Ernst Haeckel (S. Gliboff. 2008. H. G. Bronn, Ernst Haeckel, and the Origins of German Darwinism. MIT Press—see page 22)
- Rare Volumes, Serres' Comparative Anatomy and Principles of Embryology
- This article incorporates text from an equivalent article at the Spanish Wikipedia.
