= Rocetelion =

Scientific classification
- Kingdom: Animalia
- Phylum: Arthropoda
- Class: Insecta
- Order: Diptera
- Family: Keroplatidae
- Genus: Rocetelion; Matile, 1988

Genus of flies

Rocetelion is a genus of flies belonging to the family Keroplatidae.

The species of this genus are found in Europe and Northern America.

== Species ==
- Rocetelion fasciolum (Coquillett, 1894)
- Rocetelion fenestralis (Fisher, 1938)
- Rocetelion humerale (Zetterstedt, 1850)
