= André Franc =

French biologist and malacologist

André Franc (11 January 1911 – 18 October 2000) was a French biologist and malacologist. He was once curator of molluscs at the Muséum national d'histoire naturelle in Paris. Franc died in October 2000 at the age of 89.

== Publications ==
- Mollusques terrestres et fluviatiles de l' archipel Néo-Calédonien (1956)
- Traité de zoologie 2 - Spongiaires, cténaires, cnidaires with Pierre-Paul Grassé)
- André Franc's profile at the Bibliothèque nationale de France (in French)
