= Traité de Zoologie =

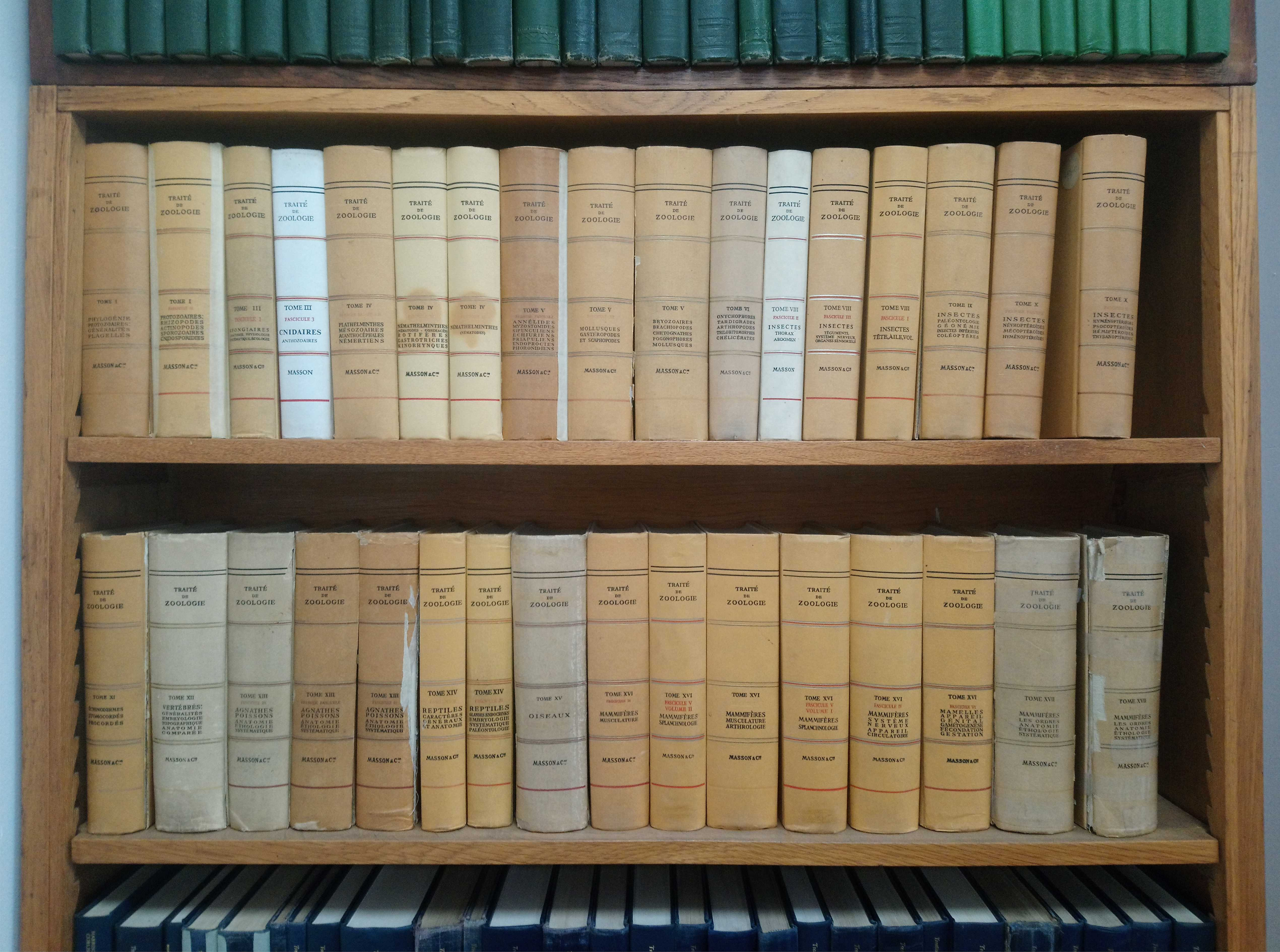

The Traité de zoologie des éditions Masson, complete title Traité de zoologie, anatomie, systématique, biologie popularly known as le Grassé is a 52 volume synthesis of Zoology published between 1948 and 1979 originally under the direction of Pierre-Paul Grassé. A new edition commenced in 1980. The books were not published in order, and some promised parts are yet to appear. The books are written in the French language.

== Tomes ==
- Tome I, Fascicule 1 (1952) : Phylogénie. Protozoaires : généralités. Flagellés.
- Tome I, Fascicule 2 (1953) : Rhizopodes, Actinopodes, Sporozoaires, Cnidosporidies.
- Tome II, Fascicule 1 (1984) : Infusoires ciliés. Tome co-dirigé avec Pierre de Puytorac.
- Tome II, Fascicule 2 (1994) : Infusoires ciliés.
- Tome III, Fascicule 1 (1994) : Spongiaires, anatomie, physiologie systématique.
- Tome III, Fascicule 2 (1997) : Cnidaires (Hydrozoaires, Scyphozoaires et Cubozoaires), Cténaires. Tome co-dirigé avec André Franc.
- Tome III, Fascicule 3 (1953, 1997) : Cnidaires anthozoaires. Tome co-dirigé avec Dominique Doumenc.
- Tome IV, Fascicule 1 (1961, 1997) : Plathelminthes, Mésozoaires, Acanthocéphales, Némertiens.
- Tome IV, Fascicule 2 (1965) : Némathelminthes (Nématodes).
- Tome IV, Fascicule 3 (1965) : Némathelminthes (Nématodes, Gordiacés), Rotifères, Gastrotriches, Kinorhynques.
- Tome V, Fascicule 1 (1959, 2007) : Annélides, Myzostomides, Sipunculiens, Echiuriens, Priapuliens, Endoproctes, Phoronidiens.
- Tome V, Fascicule 2 (1959, 2007) : Bryozoaires, Brachiopodes, Chétognathes, Pogonophores, Mollusques (généralités, Aplacophores, Polyplacophores, Monoplacophores, Bivalves).
- Tome V, Fascicule 3 (1959, 1997) : Mollusques, Gastéropodes et Scaphopodes.
- Tome V, Fascicule 4 (1997) : Céphalopodes. Tome co-dirigé avec Katarina Mangold.
- Tome VI (1949) : Onychophores, Tardigrades, Arthropodes, Trilobitomorphes, Chélicérates.
- Tome VII, Fascicule 2 (1996) : Crustacés.
- Tome VIII, Fascicule 1 (1973) : Insectes. Tête, Aile.
- Tome VIII, Fascicule 2 (1979) : Insectes. Thorax, Abdomen.
- Tome VIII, Fascicule 3 (1975) : Insectes. Téguments, système nerveux, organes sensoriels.
- Tome VIII, Fascicule 4 (1976) : Insectes. Splanchnologie, vie aquatique, rapports avec les Plantes.
- Tome VIII, Fascicule 5-A (1977) : Insectes. Gamétogenèses, fécondation, métamorphoses.
- Tome VIII, Fascicule 5-B (1977) : Insectes. Embryologie, Cécidogenèse, Insectes venimeux.
- Tome IX (1949) : Insectes : paléontologie, géonémie, Aptérygotes, Ephéméroptères, Odonatoptères, Blattoptéroïdes, Orthoptéroïdes, Dermaptéroïdes, Coléoptères.
- Tome X, Fascicule 1 (1951) : Nevropteroides, Mecopteroides, Hymenopteroides (Symphytes, Apocrites Terebranta).
- Tome X, Fascicule 2 (1951) : Hymenopteroides (Apocrites Aculeata), Psocopteroides, Hemipteroides, Thysanopteroides.
- Tome XI (1948, 2007) : Echinodermes, Stomocordés, Procordés.
- Tome XII (1954) : Vertébrés : embryologie, grands problèmes d'anatomie comparée, caractéristiques biochimiques.
- Tome XIII, Fascicule 1 (1958) : Agnathes et poissons. Anatomie, éthologie, systématique.
- Tome XIII, Fascicule 2 (1958, 1997) : Agnathes et poissons. Anatomie, éthologie, systématique.
- Tome XIII, Fascicule 3 (1958) : Agnathes et poissons. Anatomie, éthologie, systématique.
- Tome XIV, Fascicule 1a (1997) : Amphibiens. Tome co-dirigé avec Michel Delsol.
- Tome XIV, Fascicule 1b (1997) : Amphibiens et reptiles.
- Tome XIV, Fascicule 2 (1970) : Reptiles. Caractères généraux et anatomie.
- Tome XIV, Fascicule 3 (1970) : Reptiles. Glandes endocrines, embryologie, systématique, paléontologie.
- Tome XV (1950) : Oiseaux.
- Tome XVI, Fascicule 1 (1967, 1997) : Mammifères. Téguments et squelettes.
- Tome XVI, Fascicule 2 (1968, 2007) : Mammifères. Musculature.
- Tome XVI, Fascicule 3 (1971, 1997) : Mammifères. Musculature des membres, musculature peaucière, musculature des monotrèmes. Arthrologie.
- Tome XVI, Fascicule 4 (1972) : Mammifères. Systèm nerveaux, Organes des sens, Apareil circulatore, Sang et Lymphe.
- Tome XVI, Fascicule 5 (1973, 1997) : Mammifères. Splanchnologie. (in 2 books)
- Tome XVI, Fascicule 6 (1969, 2007) : Mammifères. Mamelles, appareil génital, gamétogenèse, fécondation, gestation.
- Tome XVI, Fascicule 7 (1982, 1997) : Mammifères. Embryologie, anatomie systématique et biologie.
- Tome XVII, Fascicule 1 (1955, 1997) : Mammifères. Les ordres : anatomie, éthologie, systématique.
- Tome XVII, Fascicule 2 (1955) : Mammifères. Les ordres : anatomie, éthologie, systémat
