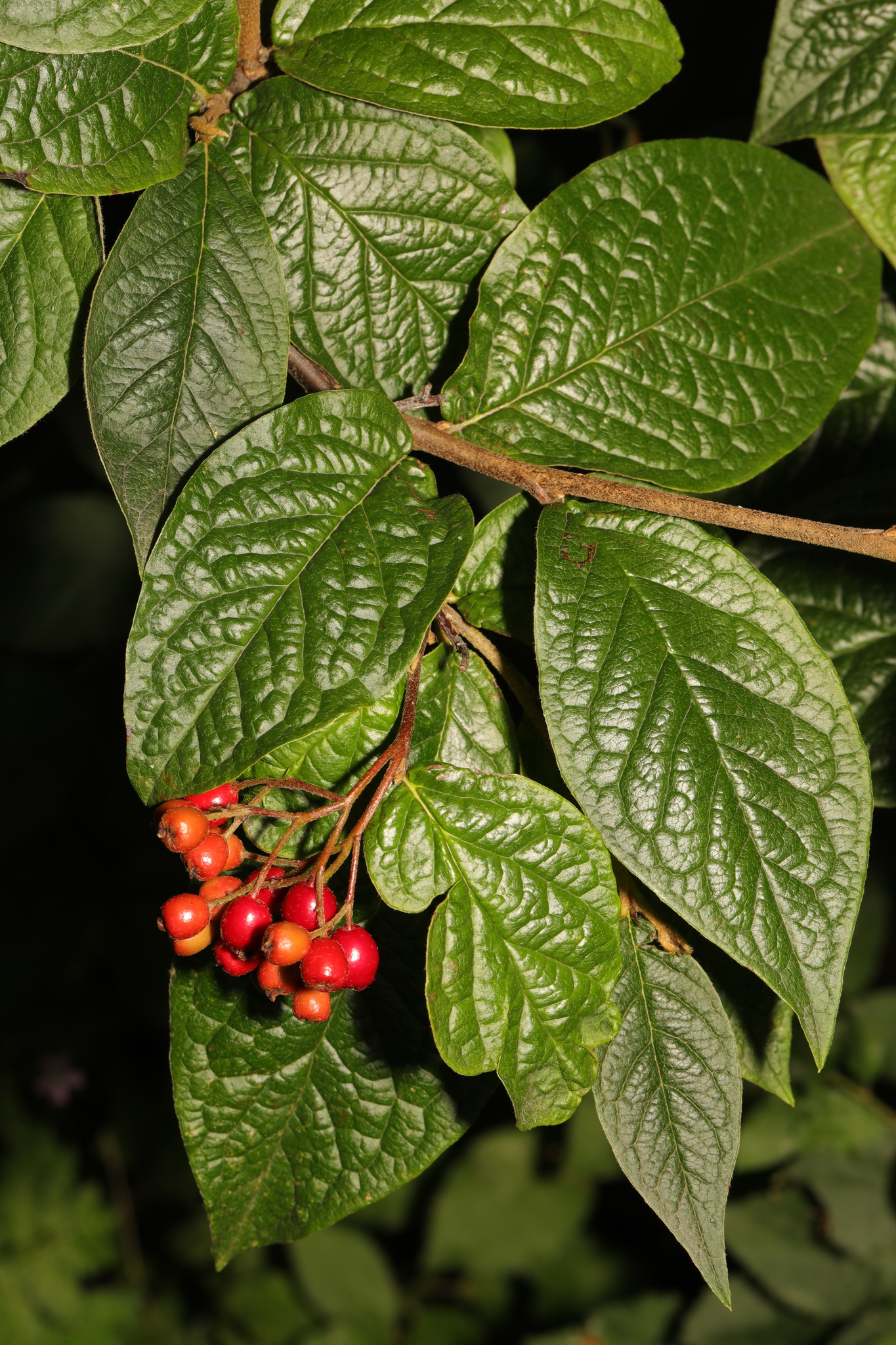
- Leaves and fruit
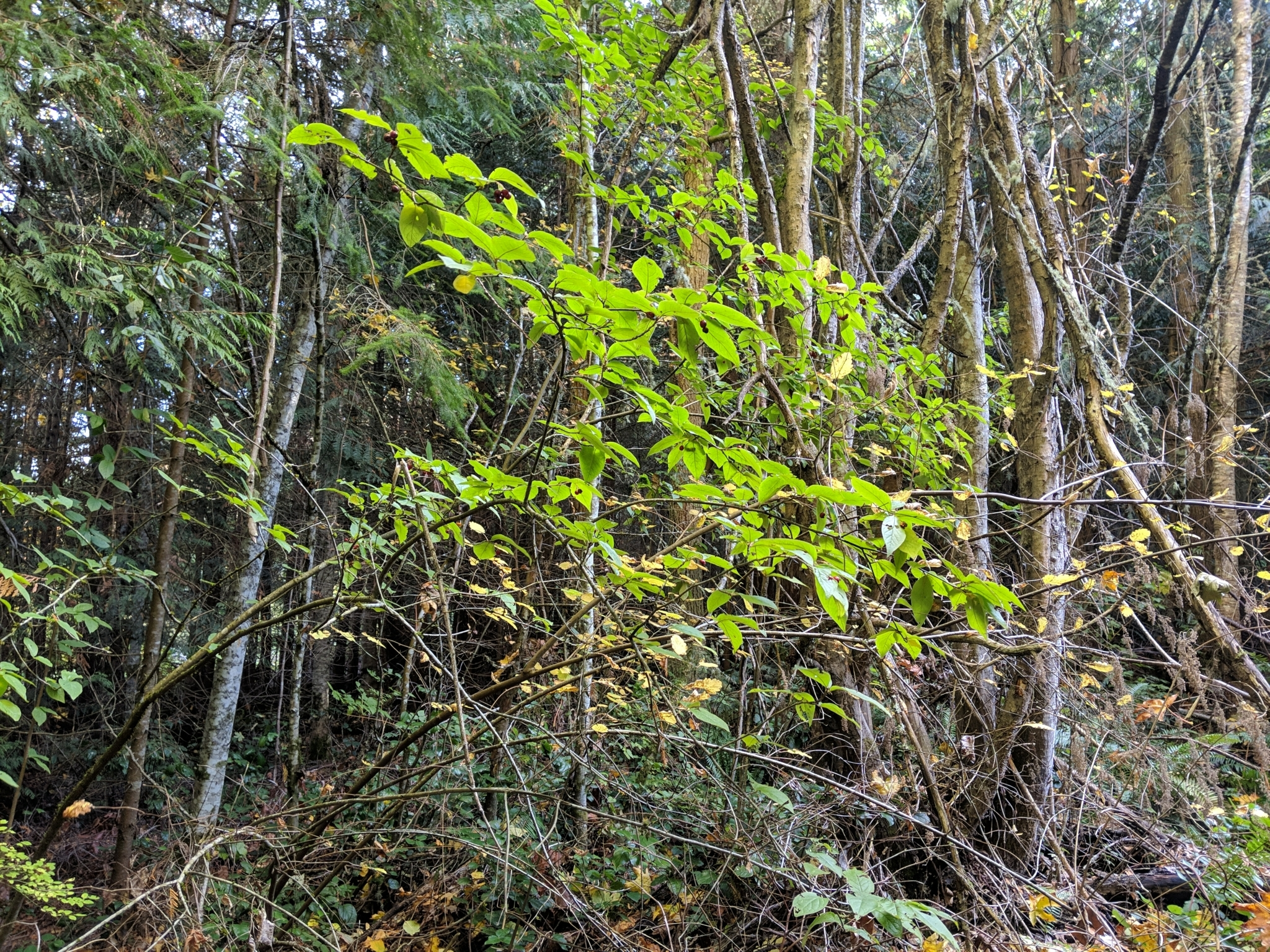
- Habit

Scientific classification
- Kingdom: Plantae
- Clade: Tracheophytes
- Clade: Angiosperms
- Clade: Eudicots
- Clade: Rosids
- Order: Rosales
- Family: Rosaceae
- Genus: Cotoneaster
- Species: C. rehderi

Binomial name
- Cotoneaster rehderi Pojark.

Synonyms
- Cotoneaster bullatus var. macrophyllus Rehder & E.H.Wilson; Pyrus rehderi (Pojark.) M.F.Fay & Christenh.

= Cotoneaster rehderi =

Species of plant

Cotoneaster rehderi, the bullate cotoneaster, is a species of flowering plant in the family Rosaceae. It is native to western Sichuan in China, and has been introduced as a garden escapee to Alaska, British Columbia, Washington state, the British Isles, France, Belgium, and Germany. Found growing in a wide variety of habitats, including sand dunes, it is very similar to hollyberry cotoneaster (Cotoneaster bullatus) but has larger, darker leaves.

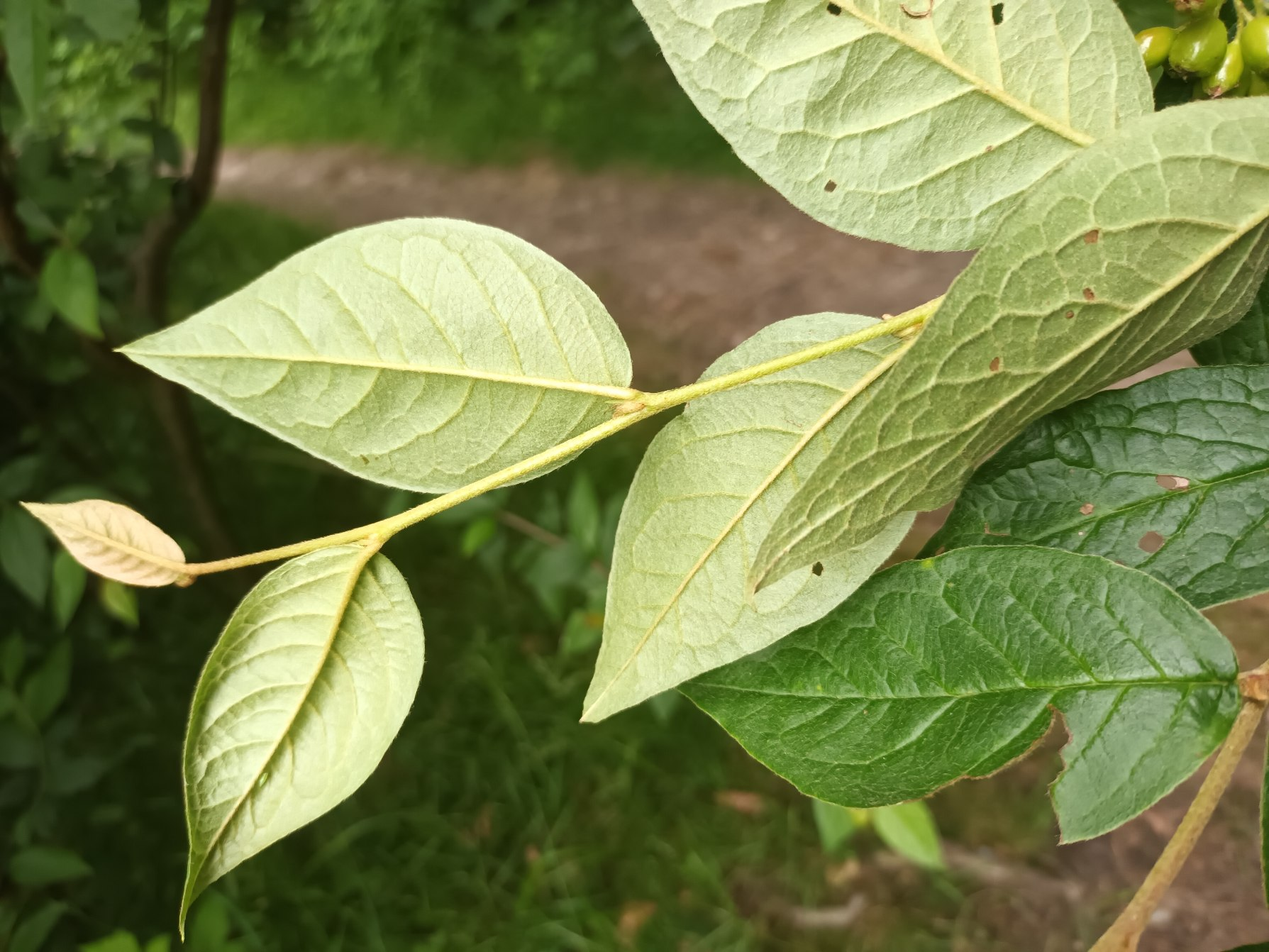
Undersides of leaves

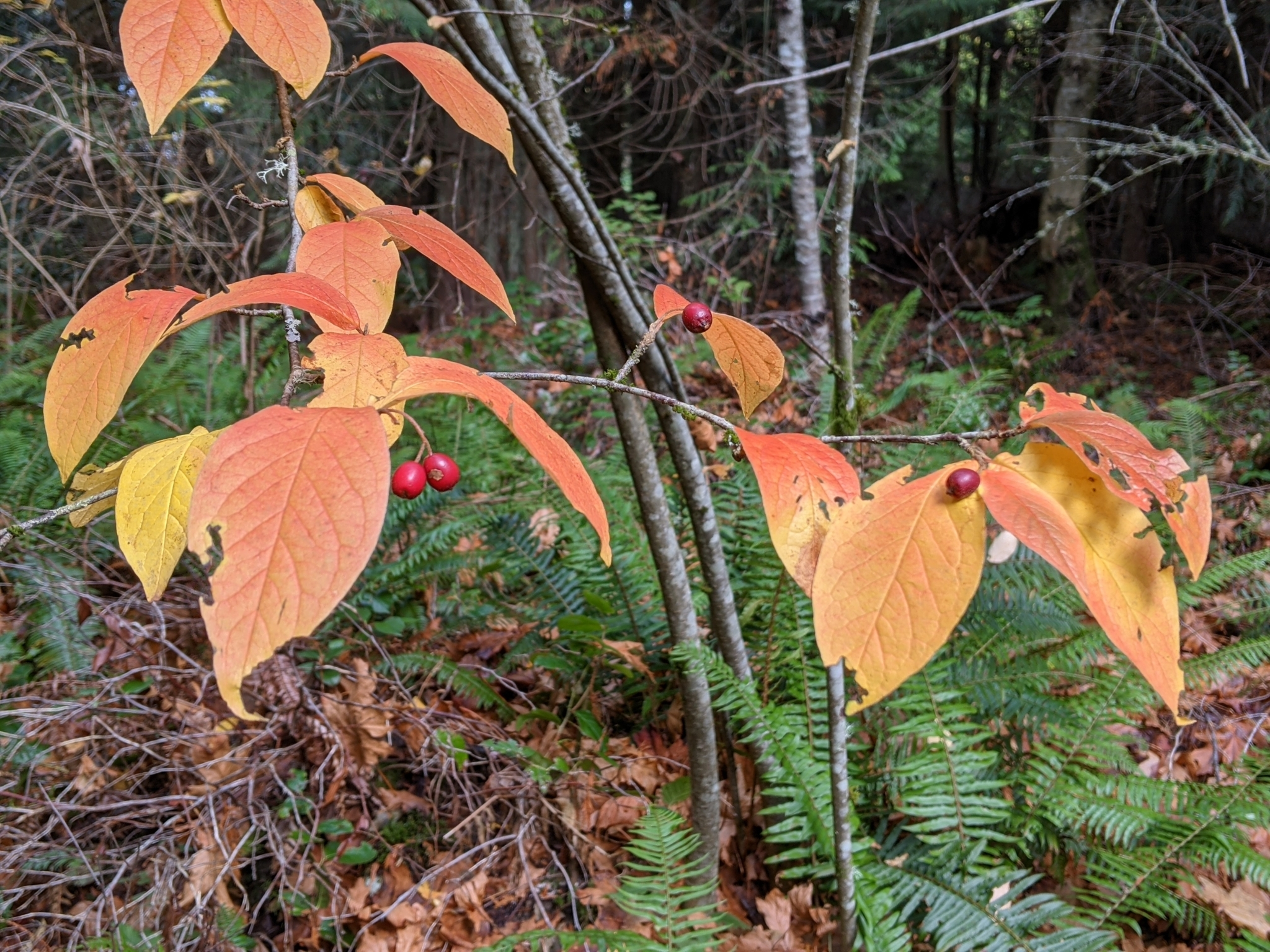
Autumn colors
