= Pierre-Paul Grassé =

French zoologist (1895–1985)

- Born: 27 November 1895; Périgueux, Dordogne, France
- Died: 9 July 1985 (aged 89); Carlux, Dordogne, France
- Education: University of Bordeaux
- Known for: Support of Neo-Lamarckism
- Awards: Prix Gadeau de Kerville of the Société entomologique de France, commander of the Légion d'honneur, doctor honoris causa of several universities
- Scientific career
- Fields: Entomologist
- Institutions: École Nationale Supérieure Agronomique de Montpellier, University of Clermont-Ferrand, Université de Paris
- Thesis: Contribution à l'étude des flagellés parasites

Pierre-Paul Grassé (November 27, 1895 in Périgueux (Dordogne) – July 9, 1985) was a French zoologist, writer of over 300 publications including the influential 52-volume Traité de Zoologie. He was an expert on termites who rejected Neo-Darwinism and was a proponent of Neo-Lamarckism.

== Biography ==
=== Education ===
Grassé began his studies in Périgueux where his parents owned a small business. He went on to study medicine at the University of Bordeaux and studied biology in parallel, including the lectures of the entomologist Jean de Feytaud (1881–1973). Mobilized during World War I, he was forced to interrupt his studies during four years. By the end of the war he was a military surgeon.

Grassé continued his studies in Paris, focusing exclusively on science. He obtained his Licence in Biology and frequented the laboratory of biologist Étienne Rabaud (1868–1956). He abandoned his preparations for the agrégation to accept a position as professor in the École Nationale Supérieure Agronomique de Montpellier (1921), where the department of zoology was led by François Picard (1879–1939). There he frequented several phytogeographers like Charles Flahault (1852–1935), Josias Braun-Blanquet (1884–1980), Georges Kuhnholtz-Lordat (1888–1965) and Marie Louis Emberger (1897–1969). He became the assistant of Octave Duboscq (1868–1943) who oriented the young Grassé toward the study of protozoan parasites. After the departure of Duboscq to Paris, Grassé worked for Eugène Bataillon (1864–1953) and there discovered techniques for experimental embryology.

In 1926, Grassé became vice-director of the École supérieure de sériciculture. He submitted his theses, Contribution à l'étude des flagellés parasites, in 1926, and it was published in the Archives de zoologie expérimentale et générale.

=== Teaching and research ===
In 1929, Grassé became professor of zoology at the Université de Clermont-Ferrand. He supervised the theses of several students on insects. He conducted his first field research trip in Africa in 1933–1934, and returned there several times (1938–1939, 1945, 1948). During these trips he studied termites, and became one of the great specialists on these insects.

In 1935, he became an assistant professor at the Université de Paris, where he worked alongside Germaine Cousin (1896–1992), and received the Prix Gadeau de Kerville de la Société entomologique de France for his work on Orthoptera and termites. In 1939 he chaired the Société zoologique de France and in 1941 the Société entomologique de France.

After having been briefly mobilized in Tours, in 1944 he succeeded Maurice Caullery as chair in zoology and the evolution of beings. Grassé was elected a member of the Académie des sciences on November 29, 1948, in the anatomy and zoology sector and presided over the institution in 1967. In 1976 he changed sectors, into the newly created animal and vegetal biology sector.

Grassé received numerous honours and titles during his career: commander of the Légion d'honneur, doctor honoris causa of the universities of Brussels, Basel, Bonn, Ghent, Madrid, Barcelona and São Paulo. He was one of the founders of the Société Française de Parasitologie in 1962. He was also a member of several academic societies, including the New York Academy of Sciences and The Royal Academies for Science and the Arts of Belgium.

=== Publications ===
Grassé began publishing a very big project in 1946 entitled Traité de zoologie. The 38 volumes required almost forty years of work, uniting some of the greatest names in zoology. They are still essential references in the field for the groups that are treated in their pages. Ten volumes are dedicated to mammals, nine to insects. Apart from this treatise, he led two collections published by Masson: the first, entitled Grands problèmes de la biologie, has thirteen volumes and the second is entitled Précis de sciences biologiques. Alongside Andrée Tétry, he composed the two volumes dedicated to zoology in the collection Bibliothèque de la Pléiade, published by Gallimard. He also supervised the edition of the Abrégé de zoologie (two volumes, Masson).

He also composed the Termitologia (1982, 1983, 1984), a work in three volumes totalling over 2400 pages. In it Grassé compiles all available knowledge concerning termites. It was by studying symbiotic flagellates in termites that he eventually began studying their hosts. In this publication, Grassé introduced the concept of Stigmergy :

"Stigmergy manifests itself in the termite mound by the fact that the individual labour of each construction worker stimulates and guides the work of its neighbour.".

He also created three scientific reviews: Arvernia biologica (1932), Insectes sociaux (1953) et Biologia gabonica (1964). He participated in several reviews like the Annales des sciences naturelles and the Bulletin biologique de la France et de la Belgique. Apart from his numerous scientific publications, he published several works popularising science such as La Vie des animaux (Larousse, 1968). He also signed the articles "Évolution" and "Stigmergie" of the Encyclopædia Universalis.

Grassé also authored many works where he talks of his views on evolution and metaphysics such as Toi, ce petit Dieu (Albin Michel, 1971), L’Évolution du vivant, matériaux pour une nouvelle théorie transformiste (Albin Michel, 1973), La Défaite de l’amour ou le triomphe de Freud (Albin Michel, 1976), Biologie moléculaire, mutagenèse et évolution (Masson, 1978), L’Homme en accusation: de la biologie à la politique (Albin Michel, 1980)...

== Neo-Lamarckism ==
Grassé was a supporter of the French tradition of Lamarckism. He occupied the chair of evolutionary biology of the Faculty of Paris, of which the two previous occupiers, Alfred Giard (1846–1908) and Maurice Caullery (1868–1958), were both also supporters of Lamarckism. Only after Grassé's retirement did the chair become occupied by a partisan of Darwinism, Charles Bocquet (1918–1977).

In support of Lamarck's theories he organised an international congress in Paris in 1947 under the auspices of the CNRS with the theme "paleontology and transformism". The records were published in 1950 by Albin Michel. He united many of the greatest French authorities on the question including Lucien Cuénot (1866–1951), Pierre Teilhard de Chardin (1881–1955), and Maurice Caullery. They were all opponents to certain tenets of neo-Darwinism. Other brilliant biologists present were John Burdon Sanderson Haldane (1892–1964) and George Gaylord Simpson (1902–1984). Grassé stated his support for Lamarck in other ways too, like an article in the Encyclopædia Universalis, and by affirming that Lamarck had been unjustifiably slandered and ought to be rehabilitated.

Some authors, like Marcel Blanc explain the strong support of Lamarck by French biologists by giving simple patriotic reasons and the historical and social context: Catholic culture favoring support of Lamarckism whilst Protestant culture favored support of Darwinism.

=== Evolution of Living Organisms ===
Grassé presents his arguments against neo-Darwinism in his work L'évolution du vivant (1973), translated into English as Evolution of Living Organisms in 1977. Against the idea which states that the evolution of living things is the product of their adapting to changes in their environments, he opposes living fossils, meaning species which stopped evolving at some point in time and have remained relatively identical to this day regardless of great climatic or geological changes (he cites numerous examples in Les formes panchroniques et les arrêts de l'évolution, p. 133). Therefore, evolution is in his opinion a process which is not necessary, it does not occur in living beings under the constraints of external physical forces (cf. Necessity-utility is not the primus movens of biological evolution, p. 302). To explain evolution he instead thinks that one must look at the internal dynamics of living things.

Biologist Theodosius Dobzhansky wrote in a review that Grassé's belief that evolution is directed by some unknown mechanism does not explain anything. He concluded that "to reject what is known, and to appeal to some wonderful future discovery which may explain it all, is contrary to sound scientific method. The sentence with which Grassé ends his book is: "It is possible that in this domain biology, impotent, yields the floor to metaphysics."

Colin Patterson reviewed Evolution of Living Organisms for the New Scientist stating that the book was a criticism of neo-Darwinism, with the opinion that paleontology is "the only true science of evolution". Patterson, a paleontologist, disputed this statement. He also noted that Grassé's own theory of neo-Lamarckism was "hard to disentangle, and there were other places where Grassé's reasoning was difficult to follow." According to Patterson the book did not mention gene duplication, but this has been well-established in evolution.

Geologist David B. Kitts negatively reviewed the book commenting that all of "Grassé's arguments have been marshaled against Darwinian theory before and, in the opinion of most Darwinians, have been adequately countered." Grassé stated that evolution was driven by an internal factor. Regarding the identification of this factor, Kitts quotes Grassé as saying "perhaps in this area of biology can go no further: the rest is metaphysics". Kitts found this statement unacceptable commenting that "the fundamental issues raised by Grassé's theory of evolution do not even belong to biology, but to some other discipline."

== Selected publications ==
- 1935: Parasites et parasitisme, Armand Collin (Paris) : 224 p..
- 1935: with Max Aron (1892–1974), Précis de biologie animale, Masson (Paris) : viii + 1016 p. – second revised edition in 1939, third edition in 1947, fourth edition in 1948, fifth edition in 1957, sixth edition in 1962, eighth edition in 1966.
- 1963: with A. Tétry, Zoologie, two volumes, Gallimard (Paris), collection encyclopédie de la Pléiade: xx + 1244 p. et xvi + 1040 p.
- 1971: Toi, ce petit dieu ! essai sur l'histoire naturelle de l'homme, Albin Michel (Paris) : 288 p.
- 1973: L'évolution du vivant, matériaux pour une nouvelle théorie transformiste, Albin Michel (Paris) : 477 p. - (a criticism of neo-Darwinism). Republished and translated into English in 1977 under the title Evolution of Living Organisms by Academic Press.
- 1978: Biologie moléculaire, mutagenèse et évolution, Masson (Paris) : 117 p. ISBN 2-225-49203-4
- 1980: L'Homme en accusation : de la biologie à la politique, Albin Michel (Paris) : 354 p. ISBN 2-226-01054-8
- 1982-1986: Termitologia. Vol. I: Anatomie Physilogie Reproduction, 676 pp.; Vol. II: Fondation des Sociétés Construction, 613 pp.; Vol. III: Comportement Socialité Écologie Évolution Systématique, 715 pp. Paris: Masson.
