= Asiorrhina =

Scientific classification
- Domain: Eukaryota
- Kingdom: Animalia
- Phylum: Arthropoda
- Class: Insecta
- Order: Diptera
- Family: Keroplatidae
- Subfamily: Lygistorrhininae
- Genus: Asiorrhina; Blagoderov, Hippa & Sevcik, 2009

Type species
- Lygistorrhina asiatica Senior-White, 1922

Genus of flies

Asiorrhina is a genus of long-beaked fungus gnats in the family Lygistorrhinidae.

== Species ==
- Asiorrhina asiatica (Senior-White, 1922)
- Asiorrhina parasiatica (Blagoderov, 2009)
