= Marie Lemoine =

French botanist (1887–1984)

Marie Dujardin Beaumetz Lemoine (French pronunciation: [maʁi dyʒaʁdɛ̃ bome ləmwan]; 1887–1984) was a French botanist and phycologist noted for her study of the algae Corallinales and her work at the National Museum of Natural History (France). She married French geologist Paul Lemoine. The standard author abbreviation Me.Lemoine is used to indicate this person as the author when citing a botanical name.
