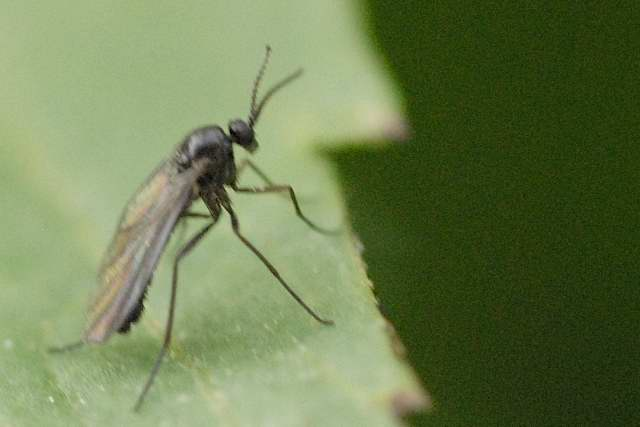
- Monocentrota lundstroemi

Scientific classification
- Domain: Eukaryota
- Kingdom: Animalia
- Phylum: Arthropoda
- Class: Insecta
- Order: Diptera
- Family: Keroplatidae
- Genus: Monocentrota; Edwards, 1925

= Monocentrota =

Genus of flies

Monocentrota is a genus of flies belonging to the family Keroplatidae. The species of this genus are found in Europe.

Species:

- Monocentrota aethiopica Matile, 1974
- Monocentrota comoreana Matile, 1979
