= Désiré Georges Jean Marie Bois =

French botanist, horticulturist and agronomist

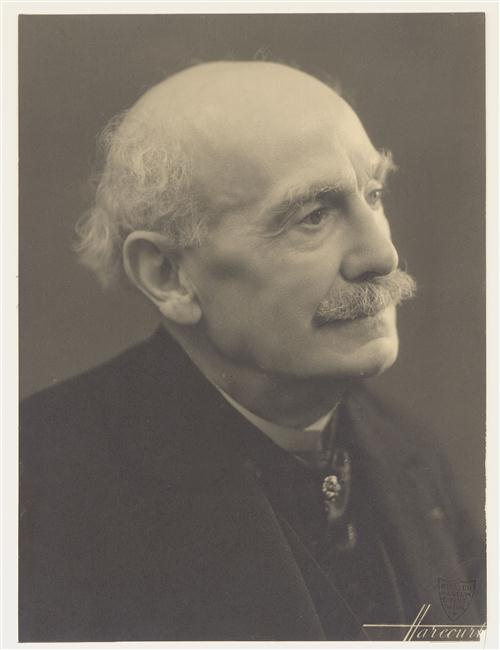
- Portrait by Studio Harcourt, unknown date
- Born: 9 October 1856; Granville
- Died: 2 February 1946 (aged 89); Saint-Mandé
- Occupations: botanist, horticulturist and agronomist

Désiré Georges Jean Marie Bois (9 October 1856, in Granville – 2 February 1946, in Saint-Mandé) was a French botanist, horticulturist and agronomist.

From 1920 to 1932 he was chair of horticulture at the Muséum national d'histoire naturelle. He was in charge of several scientific excursions, including trips to Haute-Savoie (1922) and to Belgium and the Netherlands (1932). He also taught classes at the École Nationale de la France d'Outre-Mer.

He was a member of numerous scientific societies, including the Académie des sciences coloniales (from 1925). In 1920 he was named president of the Société botanique de France, being re-chosen for a second term in 1931.

== Selected works ==
- Dictionnaire d'horticulture, 1893–1899 – Dictionary of horticulture.
- L'approvisionnement des halles centrales de Paris en 1899, les fruits et les légumes, 1900 (with Georges Gibault 1856–1941) – The supply of the central market of Paris in 1899: fruits and vegetables.
- Titres et travaux scientifiques de M. D. Bois, 1906 – Titles of scientific works by Bois.
- Le petit jardin. Manuel pratique d'horticulture, 1919 – The small garden, manual of practical horticulture.
- Les plantes alimentaires chez tous les peuples et à travers les âges : histoire, utilisation, culture, 1927 – Food plants among all nations and throughout the ages, etc.

== See also ==
- List of Chairs of the Muséum national d'histoire naturelle
