= Georges Ville =

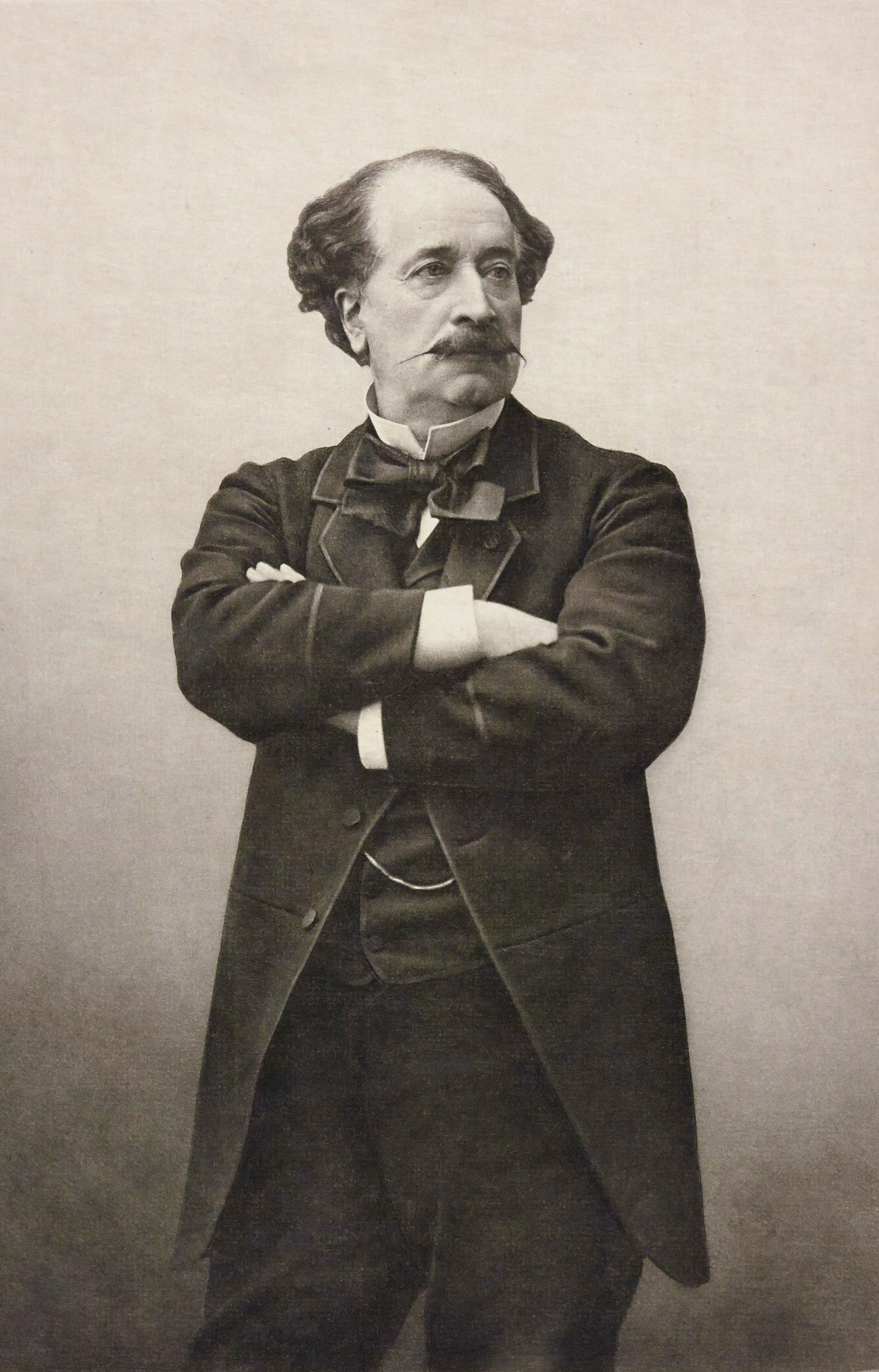
- Born: 23 March 1824; Pont-Saint-Esprit, France
- Died: February 22, 1897 (aged 72); France
- Citizenship: French
- Known for: Research on nitrogen absorption by plants, studies on chemical fertilizers
- Scientific career
- Fields: Agronomy, Plant physiology
- Workplaces: Muséum national d'histoire naturelle

Georges Ville (23 March 1824 – 22 February 1897) was a French agronomist and plant physiologist born in Pont-Saint-Esprit.

In 1843 he started his career as an interne in pharmacy. From 1857 to 1897 he held the chair of Physique végétale at the Muséum national d'histoire naturelle in Paris.

He is known for his research involving the absorption of nitrogen by plants. In 1849-1852 he carried out experiments on nitrogen absorption from the air by plants that reasserted 18th century theories espoused by Joseph Priestley and Jan Ingenhousz, stating that plants were capable of absorbing free nitrogen, a claim that was later opposed by Nicolas-Théodore de Saussure in 1804 and backed up by the experiments of Jean Senebier (1742-1809). The subject garnered enough interest in the scientific community that the French Academy of Sciences formed a committee to investigate Ville's work, resulting in a confirmation of his experiments on the matter.

He performed extensive pioneer studies on chemical fertilizers, largely carried out on his "experimental farm" (Ferme Georges-Ville) that was founded in 1860 at Vincennes.

== Selected writings ==
- Se servir de la végétation pour pénétrer et définir l’état moléculaire des corps. Analyser la terre végétale par des essais raisonnés de culture — É. Giraud (1863).
- La Production végétale, conférences agricoles faites au champ d’expériences de Vincennes dans la saison de 1864, Librairie agricole de la Maison rustique. (Crop production, agricultural lectures made in field experiments at Vincennes in the season of 1864).
- Assimilation par les végétaux de leurs éléments constitutifs. Champ d’expériences de Vincennes — Entretiens agricoles. La revue des cours scientifiques de la France et de l’étranger 18 janvier 1868.
- Premier aperçu sur les résultats de la campagne de 1868 au moyen des engrais chimiques — Librairie de la Maison rustique (1869) – First glimpse of the results of the 1868 campaign with chemical fertilizers.
- L’école des engrais chimiques, premières notions de l’emploi des agents de fertilité, Impr. impériale (1869) – The school of chemical fertilizers, first notions concerning the use of fertilization agents.
- L’Analyse de la terre par les plantes — Impr. nationale (1894).
- Recherches expérimentales sur la végétation, par Georges Ville. Dosage de l’ammoniaque de l’air, absorption de l’azote de l’air par les plantes, Third edition. Préface de Stanislas Meunier— Gauthier-Villars et fils (1897) – Determination of ammonia in the air, nitrogen absorption from the air by plants.
  - Works by Ville that have been translated into English:
- "Chemical manures. Agricultural lectures delivered at the experimental farm at Vincennes, in the year 1867". By George Ville. Translated by E.L. Howard.
- "The school of chemical manures; or, Elementary principles in the use of fertilizing agents". From the French of M. Georges Ville, by A. A. Fesquet.
