= Charles Bocquet =

French biologist (1918–1977)

Charles Bocquet (13 December 1918 – 19 June 1977) was a French biologist, Professor of the University of Paris and an expert on crustaceans.
