= Stanislas-Étienne Meunier =

French geologist

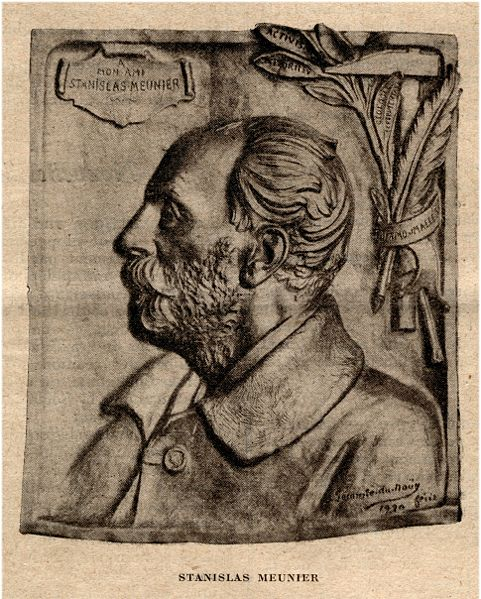
Stanislas-Étienne Meunier (1843-1925)

Stanislas-Étienne Meunier (18 July 1843 – 29 April 1925) was a French geologist born in Paris.

In 1864 he began work as an "assistant naturalist" to geologist Gabriel Auguste Daubrée (1814–1896), who was an important and lasting influence to Meunier's career. In 1867 he became affiliated with the Muséum national d'histoire naturelle, where from 1892 to 1920 he served as chair of geology.

Meunier is remembered for his work in comparative and experimental geology, and is credited for introducing experimental geology into the classroom as a specific branch of physical science.

In his studies of meteorites, he identified thirty chemical elements that could also be found in Earth-based rocks. Referring to research of Gustav Kirchhoff (1824–1887) and Robert Wilhelm Bunsen (1811–1899) involving spectral analysis of the Sun, he stated that a unity of chemical composition existed in the Solar System. Meunier also performed important geological studies (general and experimental) of the Paris Basin.

Meunier was a prolific author, publishing more than 570 works that included around thirty books. Many of his articles were printed in La Nature and Revue Scientifique.

== Written works ==
- Les Méthodes de synthèse en minéralogie (Baudry, Paris 1871) – Synthesis methods in mineralogy.
- Le Ciel géologique, prodrome de géologie comparée (Didot – 1871).
- Lithologie pratique ou étude générale et particulière des roches (Dunod – 1872).
- Le Monde végétal (Hachette – 1881).
- La Planète que nous habitons : notions familières d’astronomie physique (Hachette – 1881) – The planet we inhabit: familiar notions of physical astronomy.
- Excursions géologiques à travers la France (G. Masson editor - 1882) – Field trips throughout France.
- Les Sources (Hachette, Coll. Bibliothèque des Merveilles – 1886).
- Géologie régionale de la France, (Dunod, 1889) – Regional geology of France.
- La Géologie comparée (1895) – Comparative geology.
- Guide dans la collection des météorites avec le catalogue des chutes représentées au muséum, (Imprimerie Nationale, Paris, 1898, Muséum d’histoire naturelle) – Guide to the collection of meteorites.
- Nos terrains (Armand Colin – 1898).
- La géologie expérimentale (Alcan – 1899) – Experimental geology.
- Les Convulsions de l’écorce terrestre (Flammarion, 1909) – Convulsions of the earth's crust.
- La géologie générale (F. Alcan, Paris, 1910) – General geology.
- L’évolution des théories géologiques (second edition, 1912).
- La Géologie des environs de Paris (1912).
- La Géologie biologique (1914) – Botanical geology.
- Histoire géologique de la mer (Flammarion - 1917) – Historical geology of the sea.
- Les Glaciers et les montagnes (Flammarion - 1920) – Glaciers and mountains.
- Géologie. ouvrage destiné aux élèves des écoles d’agriculture et de l’institut d’agriculture..., aux ingénieurs, aux coloniaux... (Vuibert, 1922).
