= Lygistorrhininae =

Lygistorrhininae Temporal range: Late Cretaceous - Recent
- Lygistorrhinidae wing veins

Scientific classification
- Domain: Eukaryota
- Kingdom: Animalia
- Phylum: Arthropoda
- Class: Insecta
- Order: Diptera
- Family: Keroplatidae
- Subfamily: Lygistorrhininae; Edwards, 1925

Genera
- see text.

Family of gnats

Lygistorrhininae, commonly called long-beaked fungus gnats is a subfamily of flies in the Diptera family Keroplatidae. The groups was long treated as a separate family, but molecular phylogenetic analysis has shown it to belong to Keroplatidae. There are about 7 genera and at least 30 described species in Lygistorrhininae.

== Genera ==
- †Archaeognoriste Blagoderov & Grimaldi, 2004
- Asiorrhina Blagoderov, Hippa & Sevcik, 2009
- Blagorrhina Hippa, Mattsson & Vilkamaa, 2005
- Gracilorrhina Hippa, Mattsson & Vilkamaa, 2005
- Labellorrhina Hippa, Mattsson & Vilkamaa, 2005
- Loyugesa Grimaldi & Blagoderov, 2001
- Lygistorrhina Skuse, 1890
- Matileola Papp 2002
- †Palaeognoriste Meunier, 1904
- †Plesiognoriste Blagoderov & Grimaldi, 2004
- Probolaeus Williston, 1896
- Seguyola Matile, 1990
