= Georges Kuhnholtz-Lordat =

French agronomist and phytogeographer

Georges Kuhnholtz-Lordat (8 January 1888 in Montpellier – 5 March 1965 in Montpellier) was a French agronomist and phytogeographer.

From 1913 he served as chef de travaux at the École nationale agronomique in Montpelier. He later received his doctorate in sciences and in 1924 was named professor of botany at the École nationale d'agriculture de Montpellier. From 1954 to 1958 he was a professor at the Muséum National d'Histoire Naturelle in Paris.

He was a member of the Académie des sciences et lettres de Montpellier (1928–55) and a corresponding member of the Académie des sciences (1959–65). He was a founder of the Station internationale de géobotanique méditerranéenne et alpine de Montpellier (International station of Mediterranean and Alpine geobotany of Montpellier).

== Selected works ==
- Les dunes du Golfe du Lion : essai de géographie botanique, 1923 – The Gulf of Lion, an essay on phytogeography.
- Flore des environs immédiats de Montpellier (2 volumes, 1947–48) – Flora of the immediate environs of Montpellier.
- La cartographie parcellaire de la végétation : ses principes et ses applications agronomiques, 1949 – Parcel cartography of vegetation; its principles and agronomic applications.
- Précis de phytogénétique, 1952 – Phytogenetic specifics.
- L'écran vert, 1958 (preface by Roger Heim).
