= Loïc Matile =

French entomologist (1938–2000)

Loïc Henri Marcel Matile (26 June 1938 – 10 June 2000, in Paris) was a French entomologist who specialised in Diptera (Bolitophilidae, Diadocidiidae, Keroplatidae, Lygistorrhinidae, Mycetophilidae).

Matile worked at the Muséum national d'histoire naturelle where he held the Chair of Entomology for a brief period before his death.

== Works ==
(Selected)

- with W.A. Steffan & R.J. Gagné Families Mycetophilidae, Sciaridae and Cecidomyiidae. In Evenhuis, N.L. (ed.), Catalog of the Diptera of Australasia and Oceania. Bishop Museum Special Publication 86.(1989).
- Recherches sur la Systematique et l'Evolution des Keroplatidae (Diptera, Mycetophiloide). Memoires Du Museum National D'Histoire Naturelle 148 (1990)
- Diptères d'Europe Occidentale Tomes 1 and 2 Atlas d'Entomologie.Editions N. Boubée.Paris (2000).
