= Inflorescence =

Botanical term for a cluster of flowers

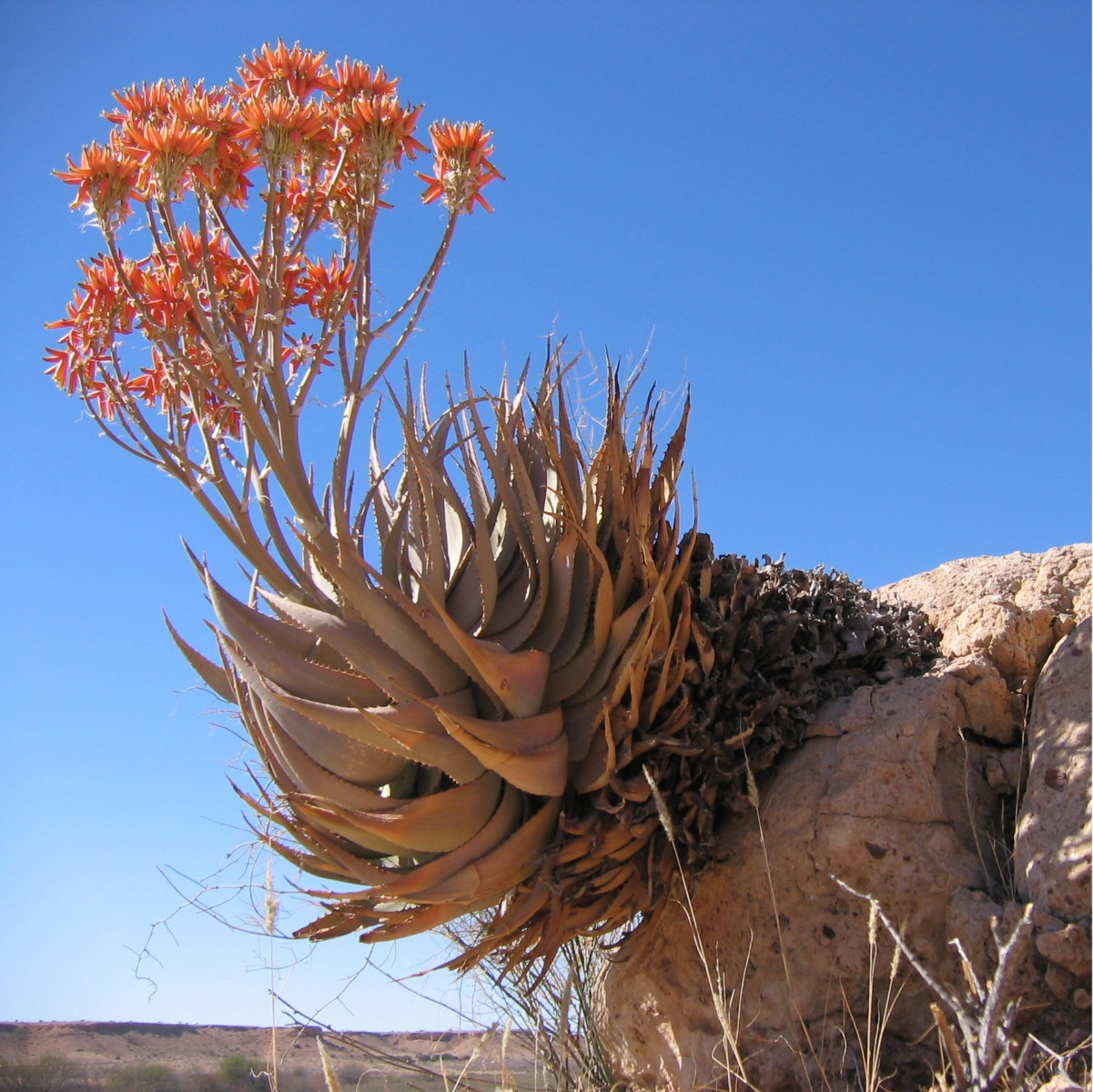
Aloe hereroensis, showing inflorescence with branched peduncle

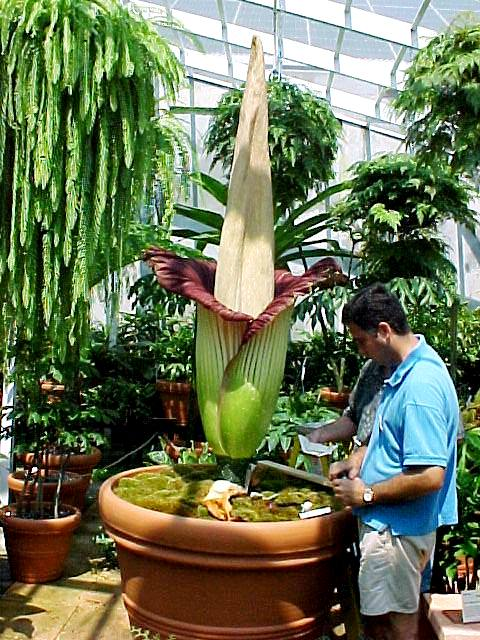
Amorphophallus titanum has the world's largest unbranched inflorescence. Photo of the plant in bloom in 2000 at Fairchild Tropical Botanic Garden in Miami, Florida, US

In botany, an inflorescence is a group or cluster of flowers arranged on a plant's stem that is composed of a main branch or a system of branches. An inflorescence is categorized on the basis of the arrangement of flowers on a main axis (peduncle) and by the timing of its flowering (determinate and indeterminate).

Morphologically, an inflorescence is the modified part of the shoot of seed plants where flowers are formed on the axis of a plant. The modifications can involve the length and the nature of the internodes and the phyllotaxis, as well as variations in the proportions, compressions, swellings, adnations, connations and reduction of main and secondary axes.

One can also define an inflorescence as the reproductive portion of a plant that bears a cluster of flowers in a specific pattern.

== General characteristics ==
Inflorescences are described by many different characteristics including how the flowers are arranged on the peduncle, the blooming order of the flowers, and how different clusters of flowers are grouped within it. These terms are general representations as plants in nature can have a combination of types. Because flowers facilitate plant reproduction, inflorescence characteristics are largely a result of natural selection.

The stem holding the whole inflorescence is called a peduncle. The main axis (also referred to as the major stem) above the peduncle bearing the flowers or secondary branches is called the rachis. The stalk of each flower in the inflorescence is called a pedicel. A flower that is not part of an inflorescence is called a solitary flower and its stalk is also referred to as a peduncle. Any flower in an inflorescence may be referred to as a floret, especially when the individual flowers are particularly small and borne in a tight cluster, such as in a pseudanthium. The fruiting stage of an inflorescence is known as an infructescence. Inflorescences may be simple (single) or complex (panicle). The rachis may be one of several types, including single, composite, umbel, spike or raceme.

In some species the flowers develop directly from the main stem or woody trunk, rather than from the plant's main shoot. This is called cauliflory and is found across a number of plant families. An extreme version of this is flagelliflory where long, whip-like branches grow from the main trunk to the ground and even below it. Inflorescences form directly on these branches.

=== Terminal flower ===
Plant organs can grow according to two different schemes, namely monopodial or racemose and sympodial or cymose. In inflorescences these two different growth patterns are called indeterminate and determinate respectively, and indicate whether a terminal flower is formed and where flowering starts within the inflorescence.

- Indeterminate inflorescence: Monopodial (racemose) growth. The terminal bud keeps growing and forming lateral flowers. A terminal flower is never formed.
- Determinate inflorescence: Sympodial (cymose) growth. The terminal bud forms a terminal flower and then dies out. Other flowers then grow from lateral buds.

Indeterminate and determinate inflorescences are sometimes referred to as open and closed inflorescences respectively. The indeterminate patterning of flowers is derived from determinate flowers. It is suggested that indeterminate flowers have a common mechanism that prevents terminal flower growth. Based on phylogenetic analyses, this mechanism arose independently multiple times in different species.

In an indeterminate inflorescence, there is no true terminal flower and the stem usually has a rudimentary end. In many cases the last true flower formed by the terminal bud (subterminal flower) straightens up, appearing to be a terminal flower. Often a vestige of the terminal bud may be noticed higher on the stem.

Indeterminate inflorescence with a perfect acropetal maturation

Indeterminate inflorescence with an acropetal maturation and lateral flower buds

Indeterminate inflorescence with the subterminal flower to simulate the terminal one (vestige present)

In determinate inflorescences, the terminal flower is usually the first to mature (precursive development), while the others tend to mature starting from the base of the stem. This pattern is called acropetal maturation. When flowers start to mature from the top of the stem, maturation is basipetal, whereas when the central mature first, maturation is divergent.

Determinate inflorescence with acropetal maturation

Determinate inflorescence with basipetal maturation

Determinate inflorescence with divergent maturation

=== Phyllotaxis ===
As with leaves, flowers can be arranged on the stem according to many different patterns. See 'Phyllotaxis' for in-depth descriptions.

Alternate flowers

Opposite flowers

Similarly, the arrangement of leaves in buds is called ptyxis.

When a single or a cluster of flower(s) is located at the axil of a peduncle, the location of the bract in relation to the stem holding the flowers is indicated by the use of different terms and may be a useful diagnostic indicator.

Typical placement of bracts include:

- Some plants have bracts that subtend the inflorescence, where the flowers are on branched stalks; the bracts are not connected to the stalks holding the flowers, but are adnate or attached to the main stem (Adnate describes the fusing together of different unrelated parts. When the parts fused together are the same, they are connately joined.)
- Other plants have the bracts subtend the pedicel or peduncle of single flowers.

Metatopic placement of bracts include:

- When the bract is attached to the stem holding the flower (the pedicel or peduncle), it is said to be recaulescent; sometimes these bracts or bracteoles are highly modified and appear to be appendages of the flower calyx. Recaulescence is the fusion of the subtending leaf with the stem holding the bud or the bud itself, thus the leaf or bract is adnate to the stem of flower.
- When the formation of the bud is shifted up the stem distinctly above the subtending leaf, it is described as concaulescent.
Flower and subtending bract

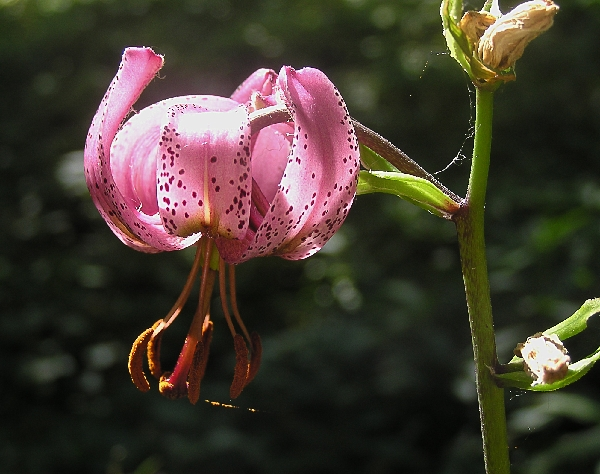
Lilium martagon (flower and subtending bract)

Concaulescence

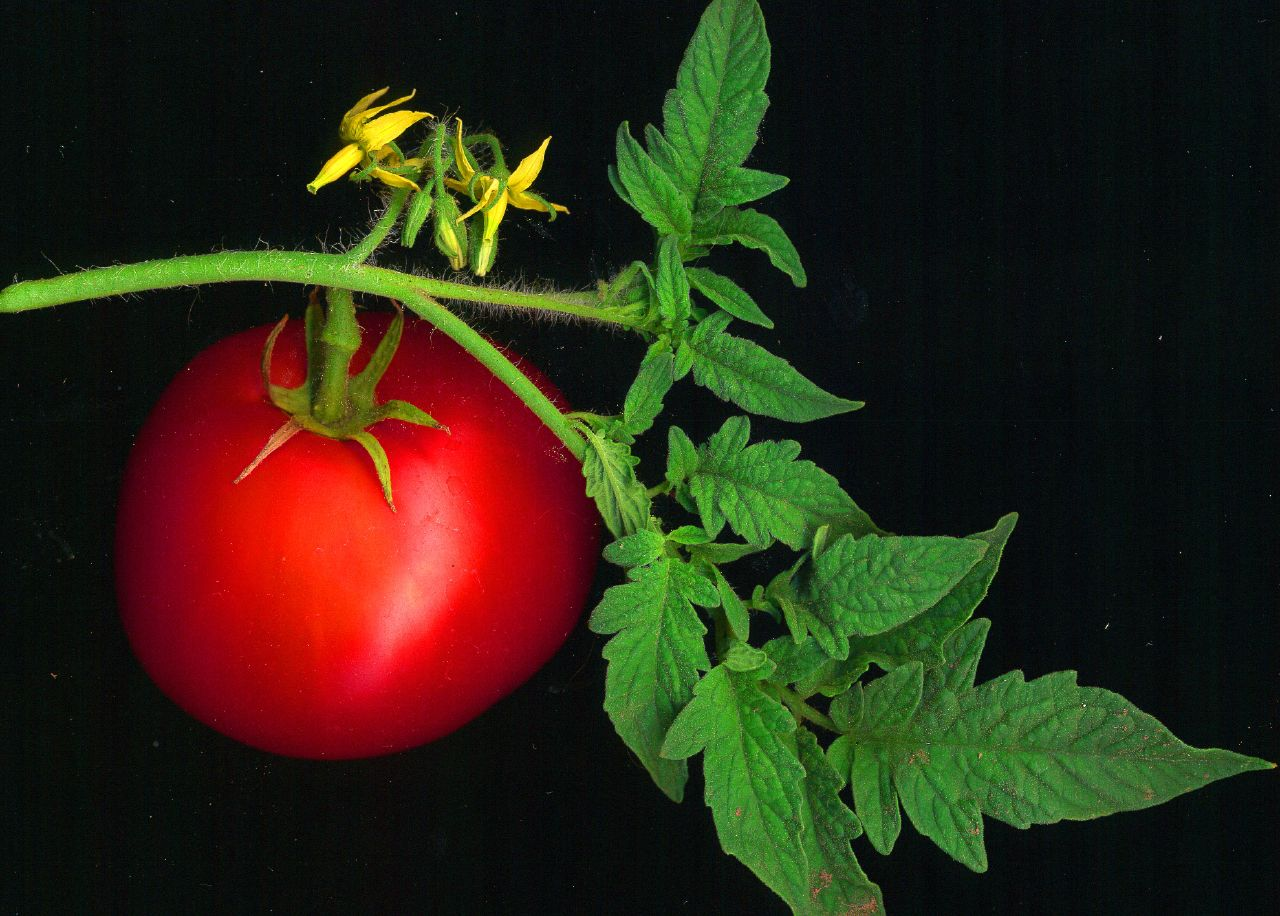
Solanum lycopersicum (concaulescence)

Recaulescence

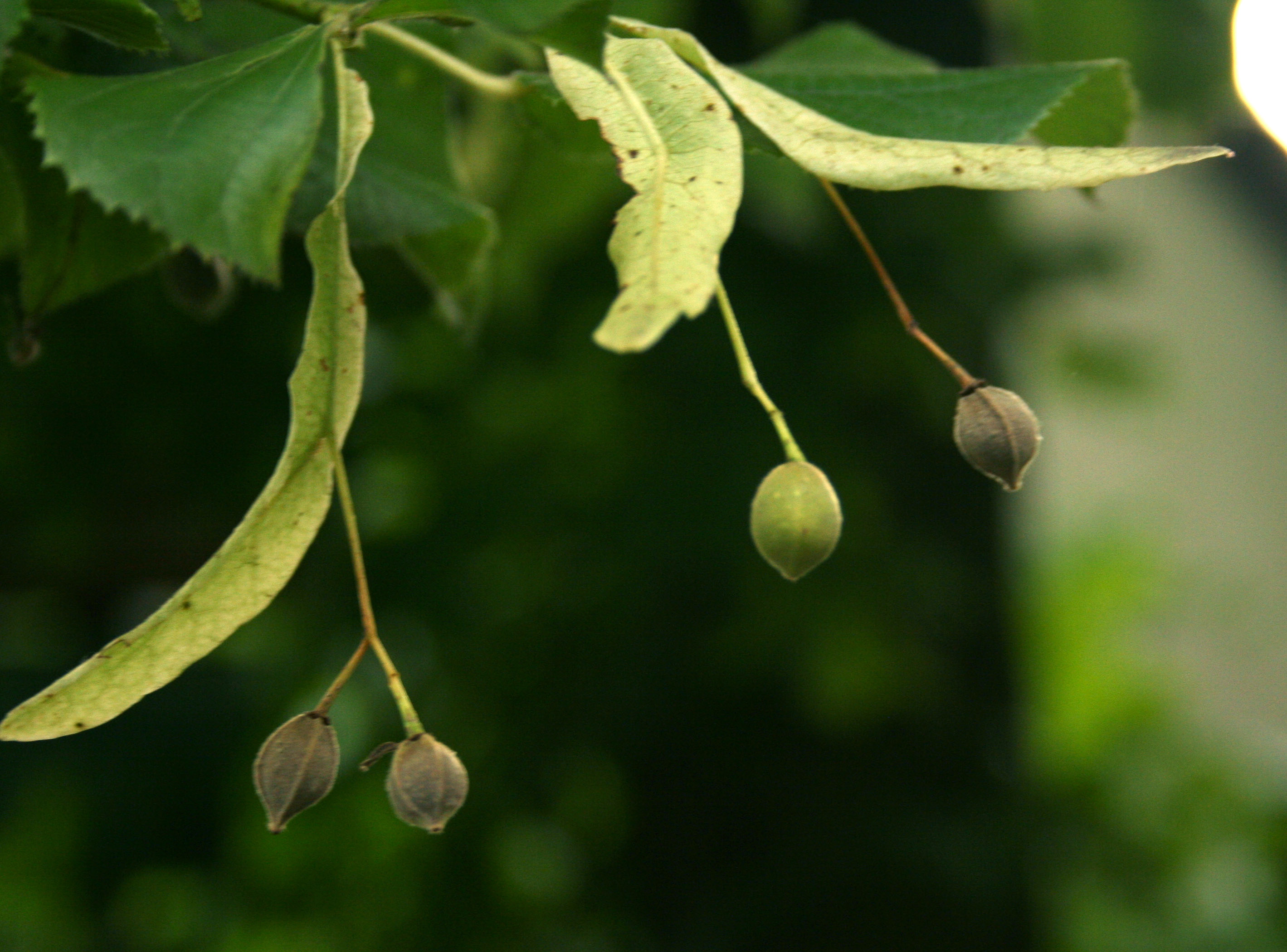
Tilia cordata (recaulescence)

== Organization ==
There is no general consensus in defining the different inflorescences. The following is based on Focko Weberling's Morphologie der Blüten und der Blütenstände (Stuttgart, 1981). The main groups of inflorescences are distinguished by branching. Within these groups, the most important characteristics are the intersection of the axes and different variations of the model. They may contain many flowers (pluriflor) or a few (pauciflor). Inflorescences can be simple or compound.

=== Simple inflorescences ===
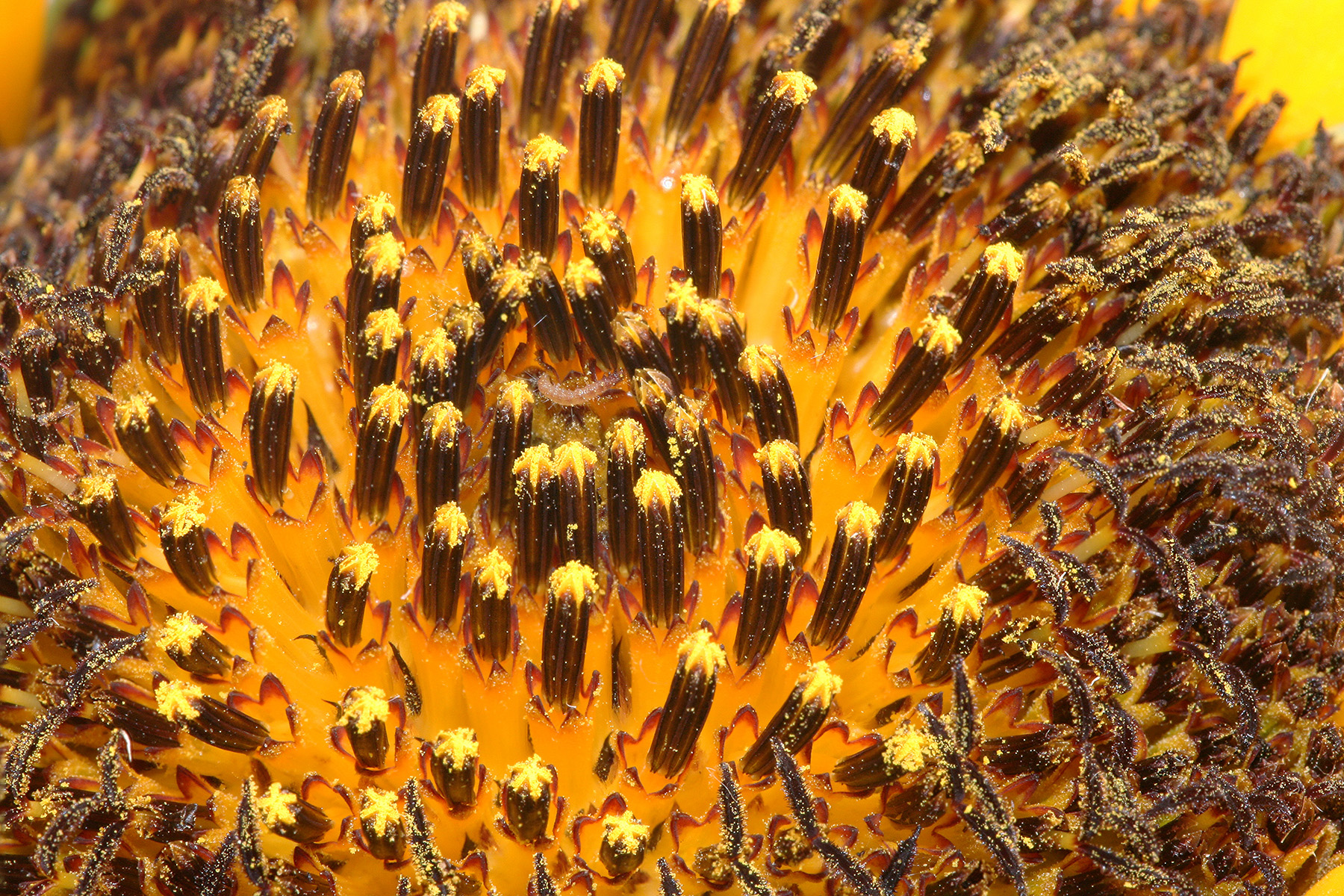
Inflorescence of sessile disc florets forming the capitulum

==== Indeterminate or racemose ====
Indeterminate simple inflorescences are generally called racemose /ˈræsɪmoʊs/. The main kind of racemose inflorescence is the raceme (/ˈræsiːm/, from classical Latin racemus, cluster of grapes). The other kind of racemose inflorescences can all be derived from this one by dilation, compression, swelling or reduction of the different axes. Some passage forms between the obvious ones are commonly admitted.

- A raceme is an unbranched, indeterminate inflorescence with pedicellate (having short floral stalks) flowers along the axis.
- A spike is a type of raceme with flowers that do not have a pedicel.
- A racemose corymb is an unbranched, indeterminate inflorescence that is flat-topped or convex due to their outer pedicels which are progressively longer than inner ones.
- An umbel is a type of raceme with a short axis and multiple floral pedicels of equal length that appear to arise from a common point. It is characteristic of Umbelliferae.
- A spadix is a spike of flowers densely arranged around it, enclosed or accompanied by a highly specialised bract called a spathe. It is characteristic of the family Araceae.
- A flower head or capitulum is a very contracted raceme in which the single sessile flowers share are borne on an enlarged stem. It is characteristic of Dipsacaceae.
- A catkin or ament is a scaly, generally drooping spike or raceme. Cymose or other complex inflorescences that are superficially similar are also generally called thus.
Raceme

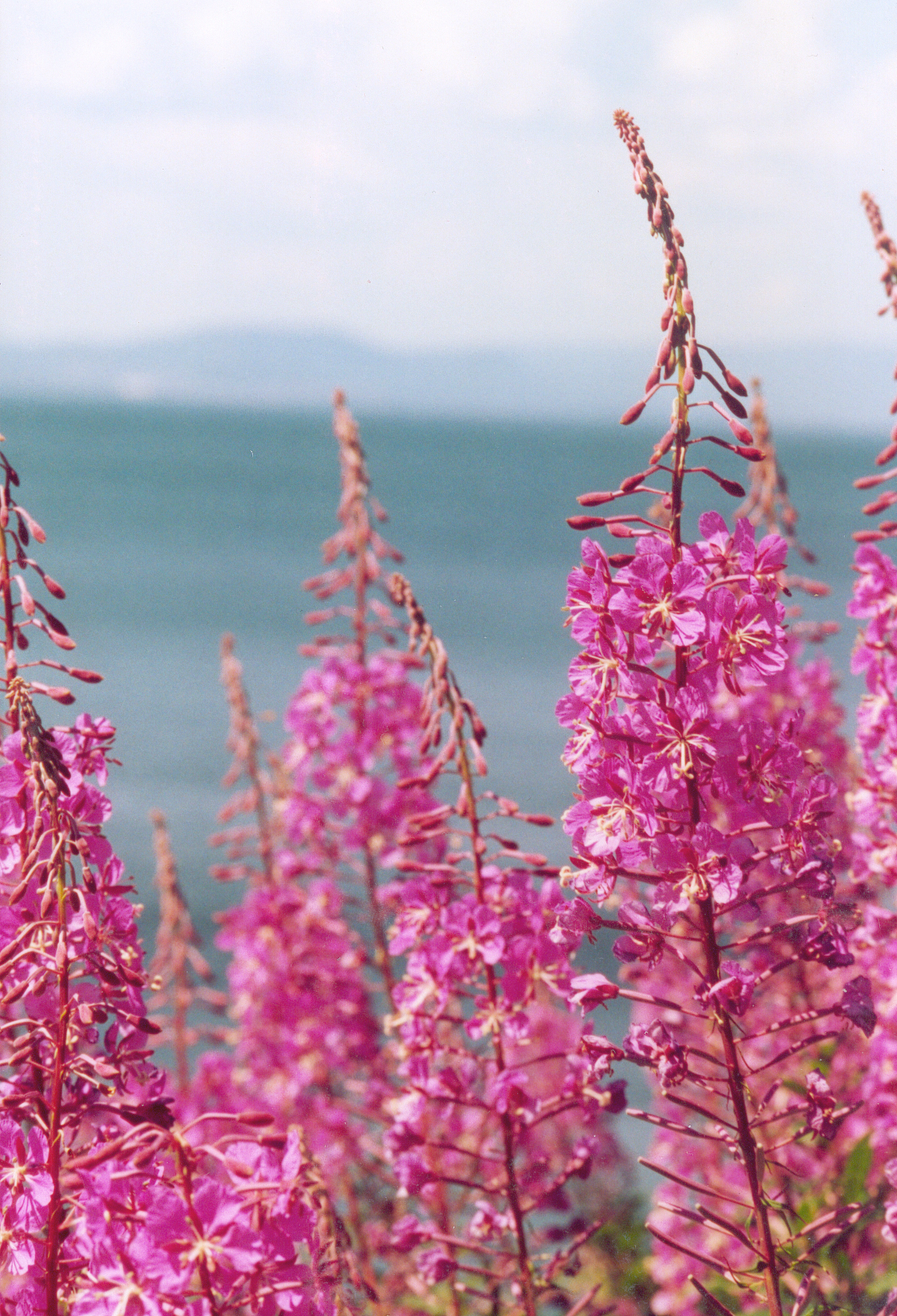
Epilobium angustifolium

Spike

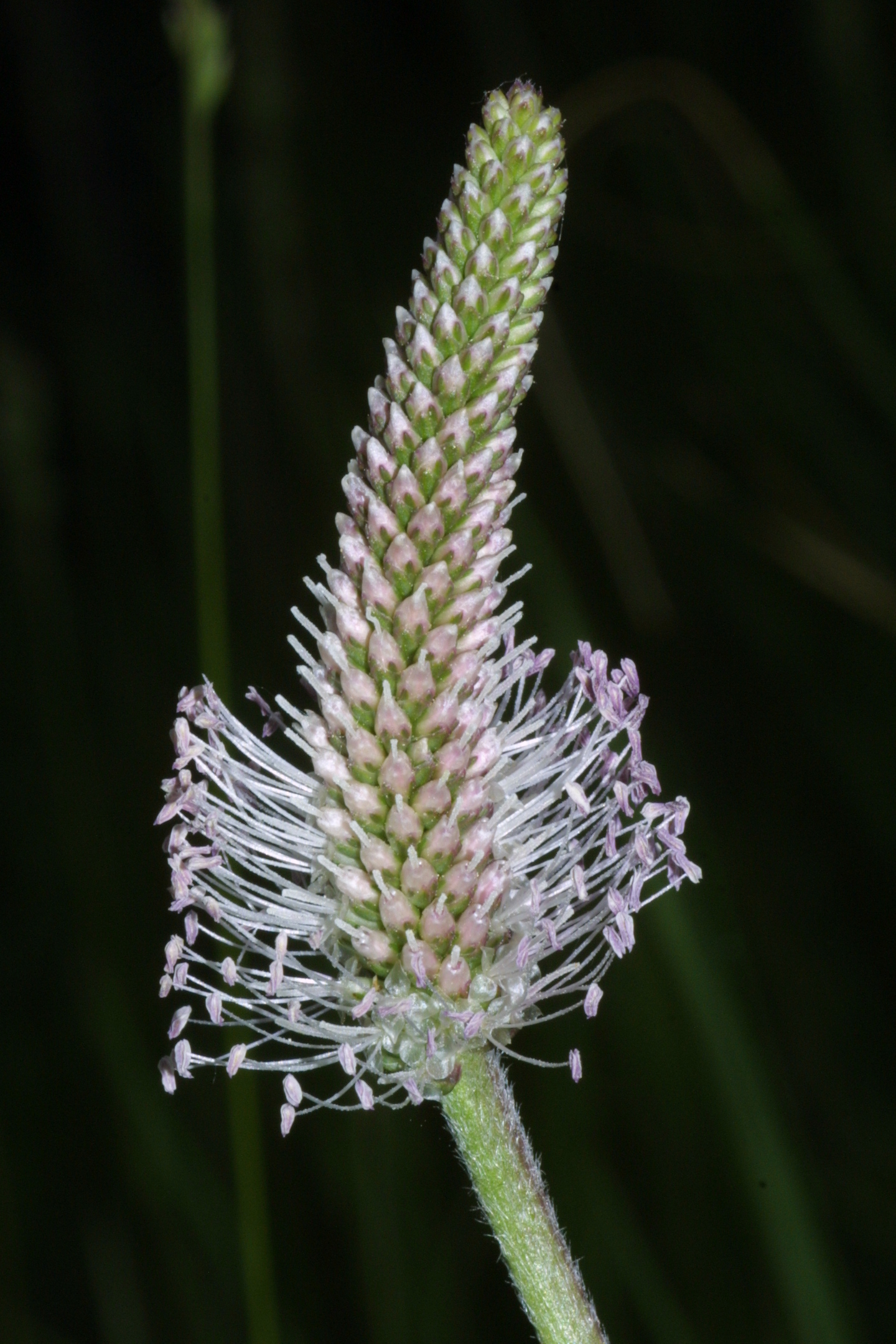
Plantago media (spike)

Racemose corymb

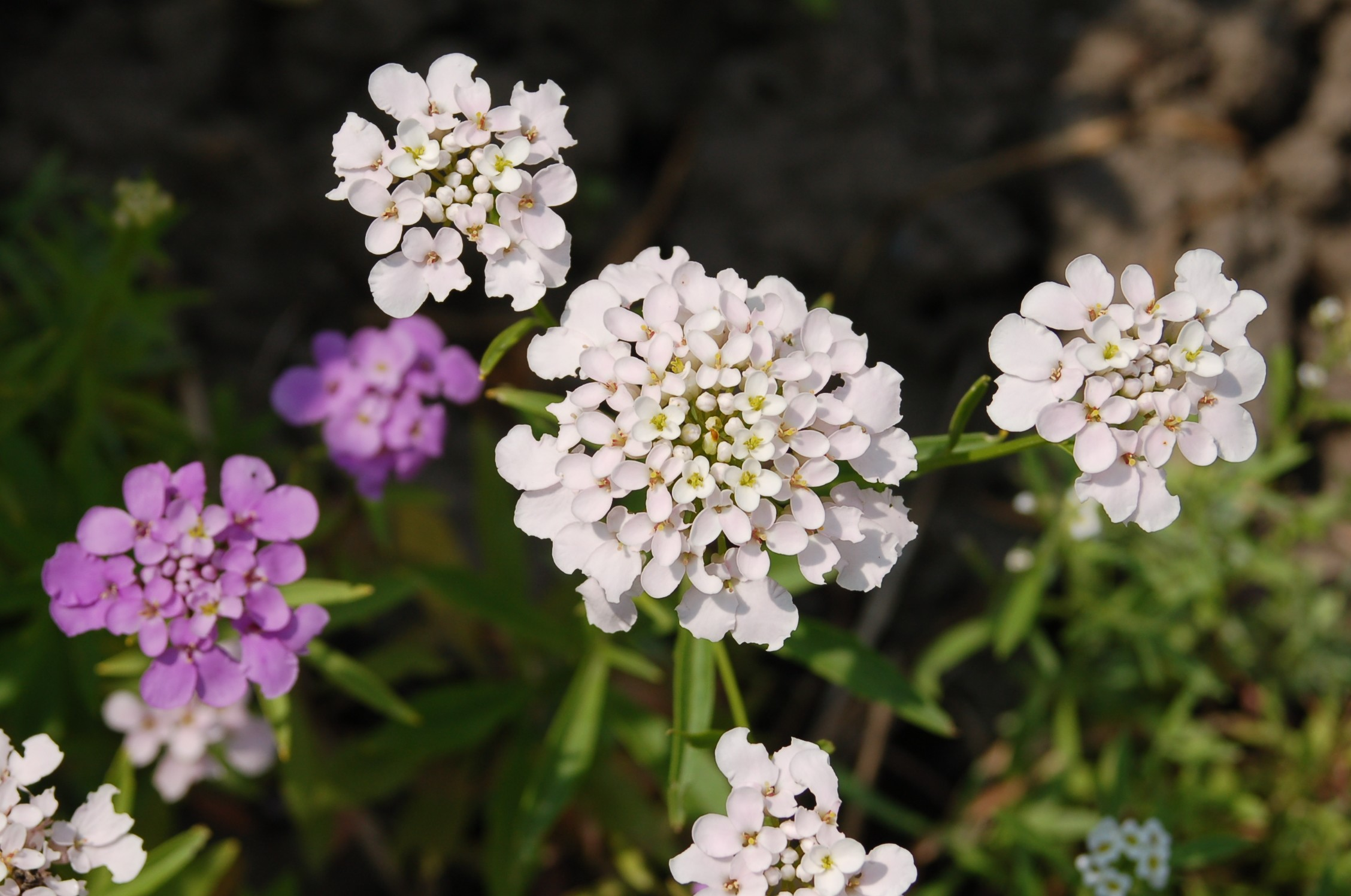
Iberis umbellata (racemose corymb)

Umbel

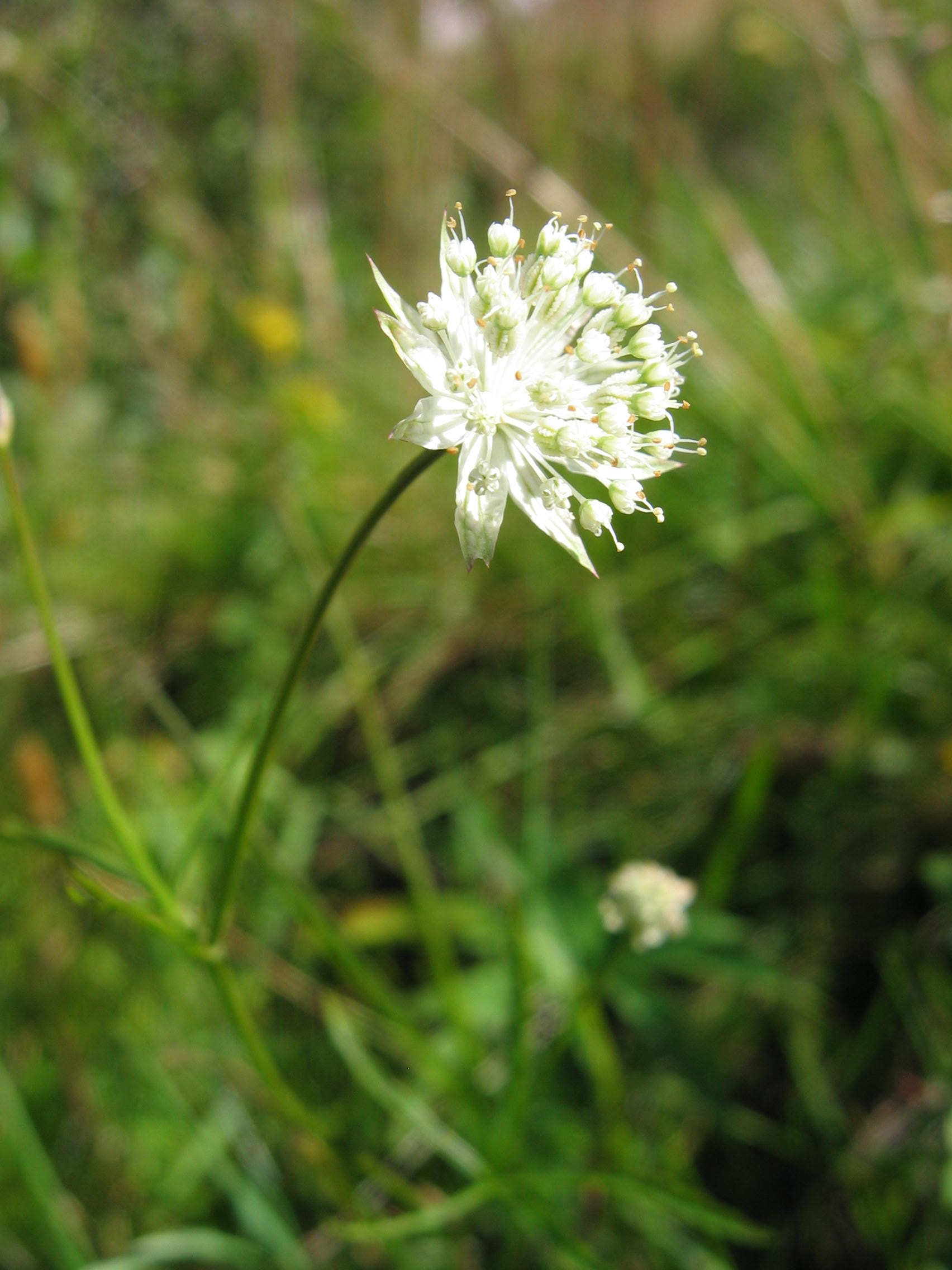
Astrantia minor (umbel)

Spadix

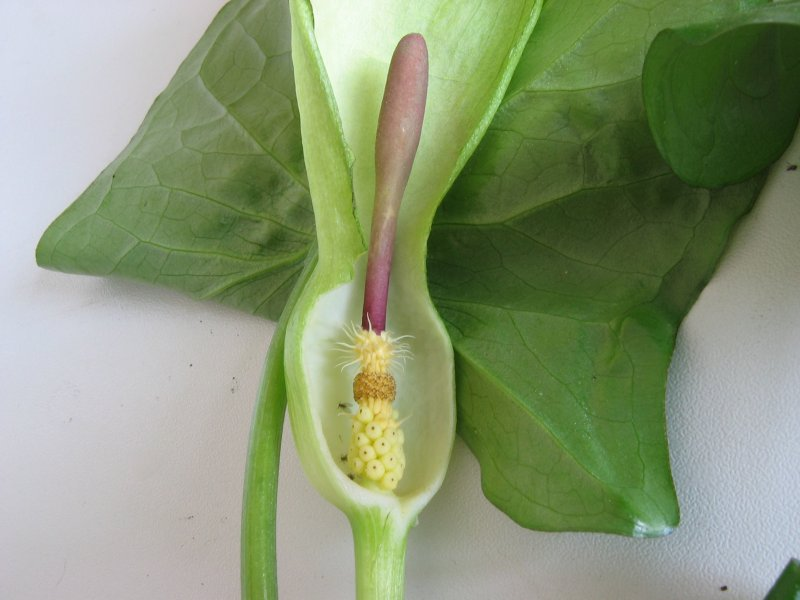
Arum maculatum (spadix)

Head (round)

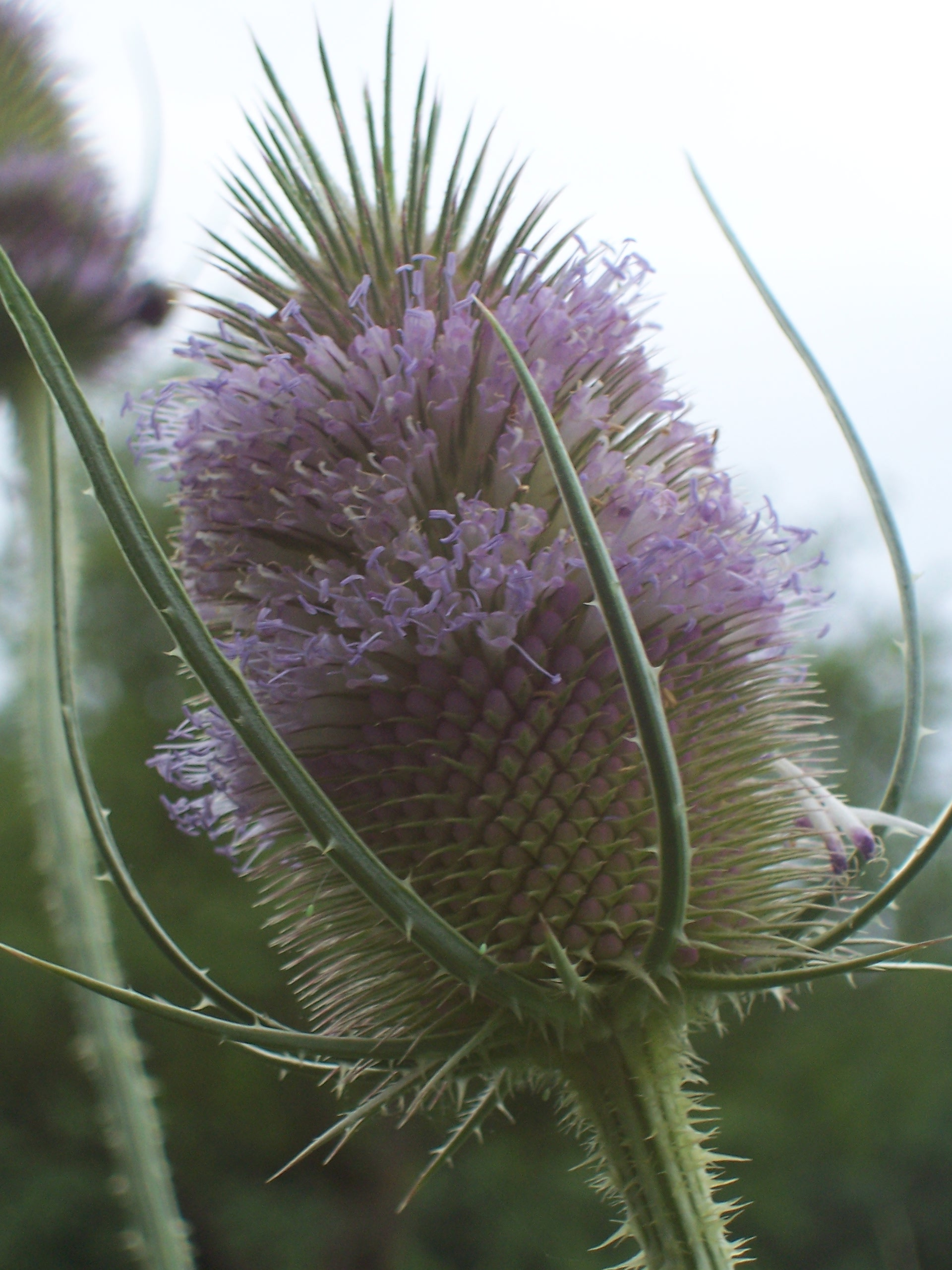
Dipsacus fullonum (head)

Catkin (racemose or spicate)

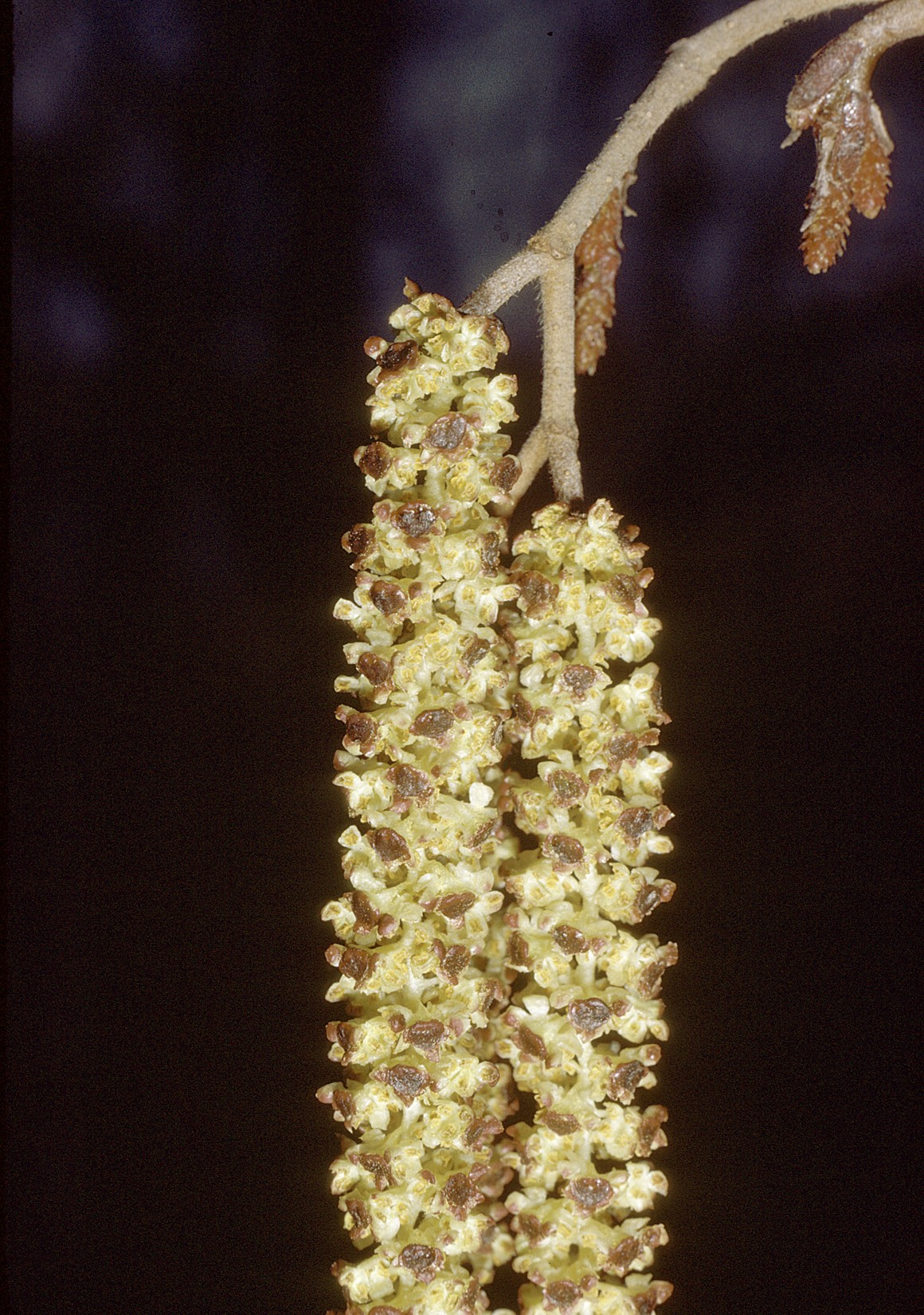
Alnus incana (ament)

==== Determinate or cymose ====
Determinate simple inflorescences are generally called cymose. The main kind of cymose inflorescence is the cyme (pronounced /saɪm/), from the Latin cyma in the sense 'cabbage sprout', from Greek kuma 'anything swollen'). Cymes are further divided according to this scheme:

- Only one secondary axis: monochasium
  - Secondary buds always develop on the same side of the stem: helicoid cyme or bostryx
    - The successive pedicels are aligned on the same plane: drepanium
  - Secondary buds develop alternately on the stem : scorpioid cyme
    - The successive pedicels are arranged in a sort of spiral: cincinnus (characteristic of the Boraginaceae and Commelinaceae)
    - The successive pedicels follow a zig-zag path on the same plane: rhipidium (many Iridaceae)
- Two secondary axes: dichasial cyme
  - Secondary axis still dichasial: dichasium (characteristic of Caryophyllaceae)
  - Secondary axis monochasia: double scorpioid cyme or double helicoid cyme
- More than two secondary axes: pleiochasium
Simple dichasium

Double cyme

Double cyme

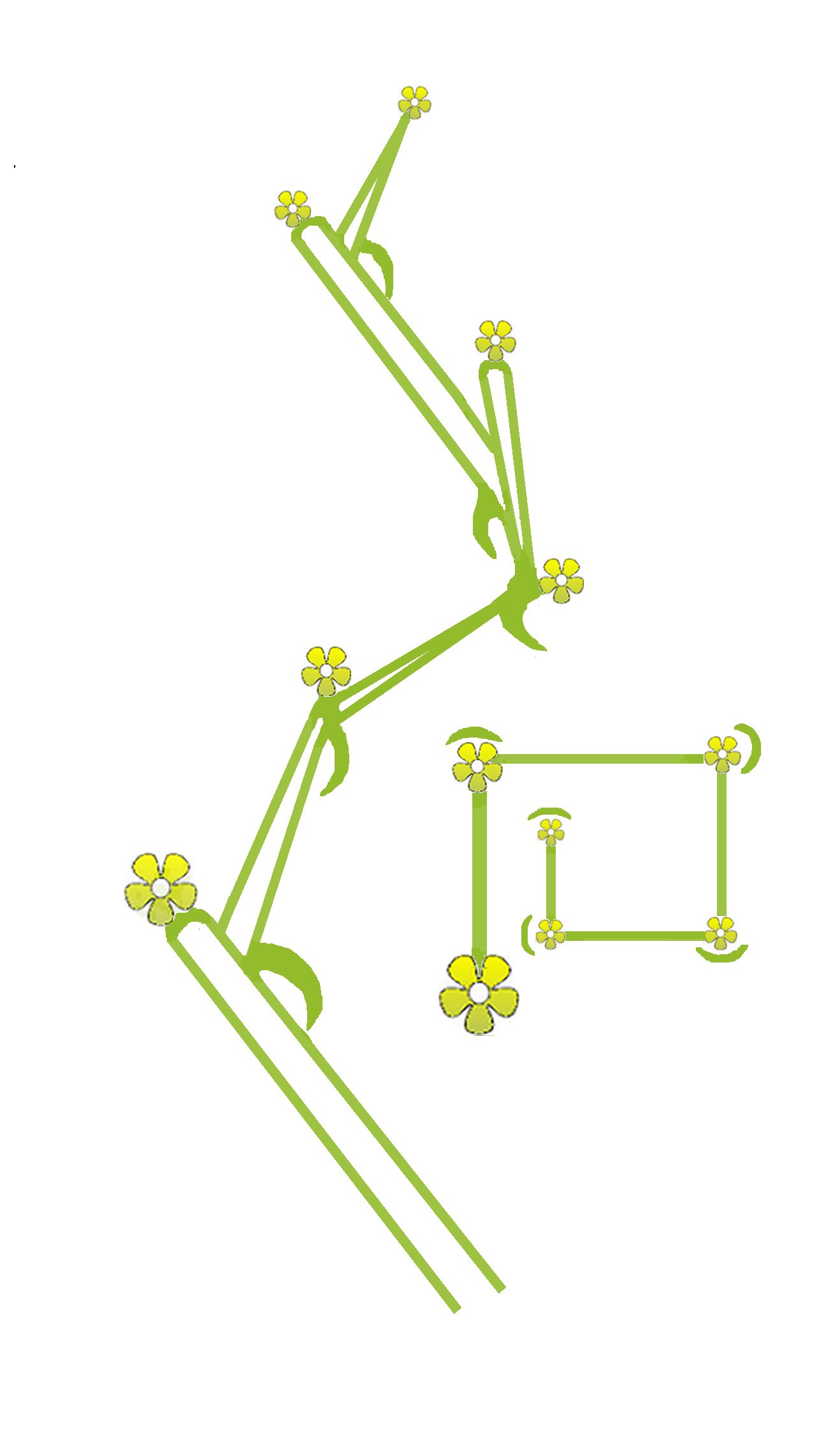
Bostryx (lateral and top view)

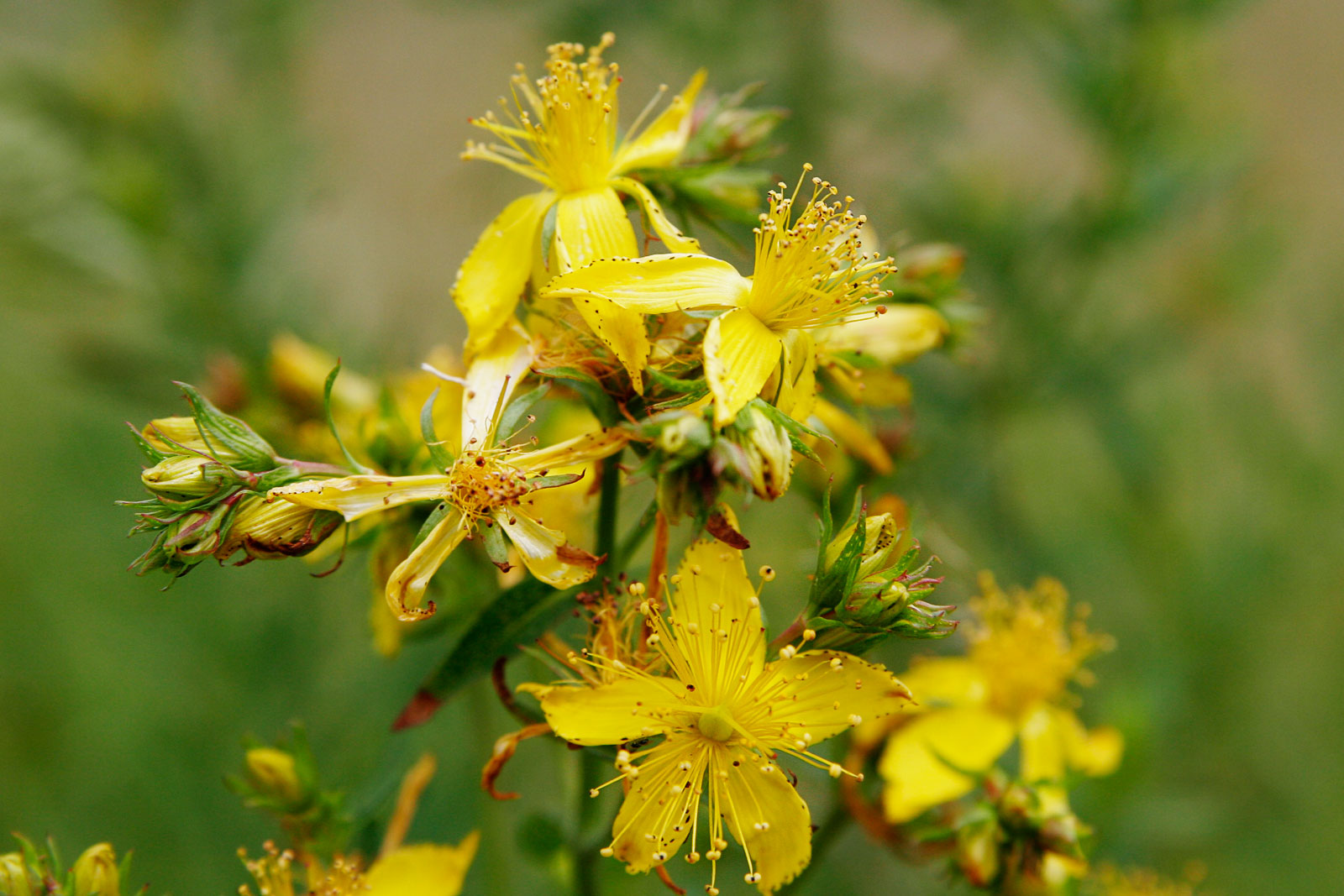
Hypericum perforatum (bostryx)

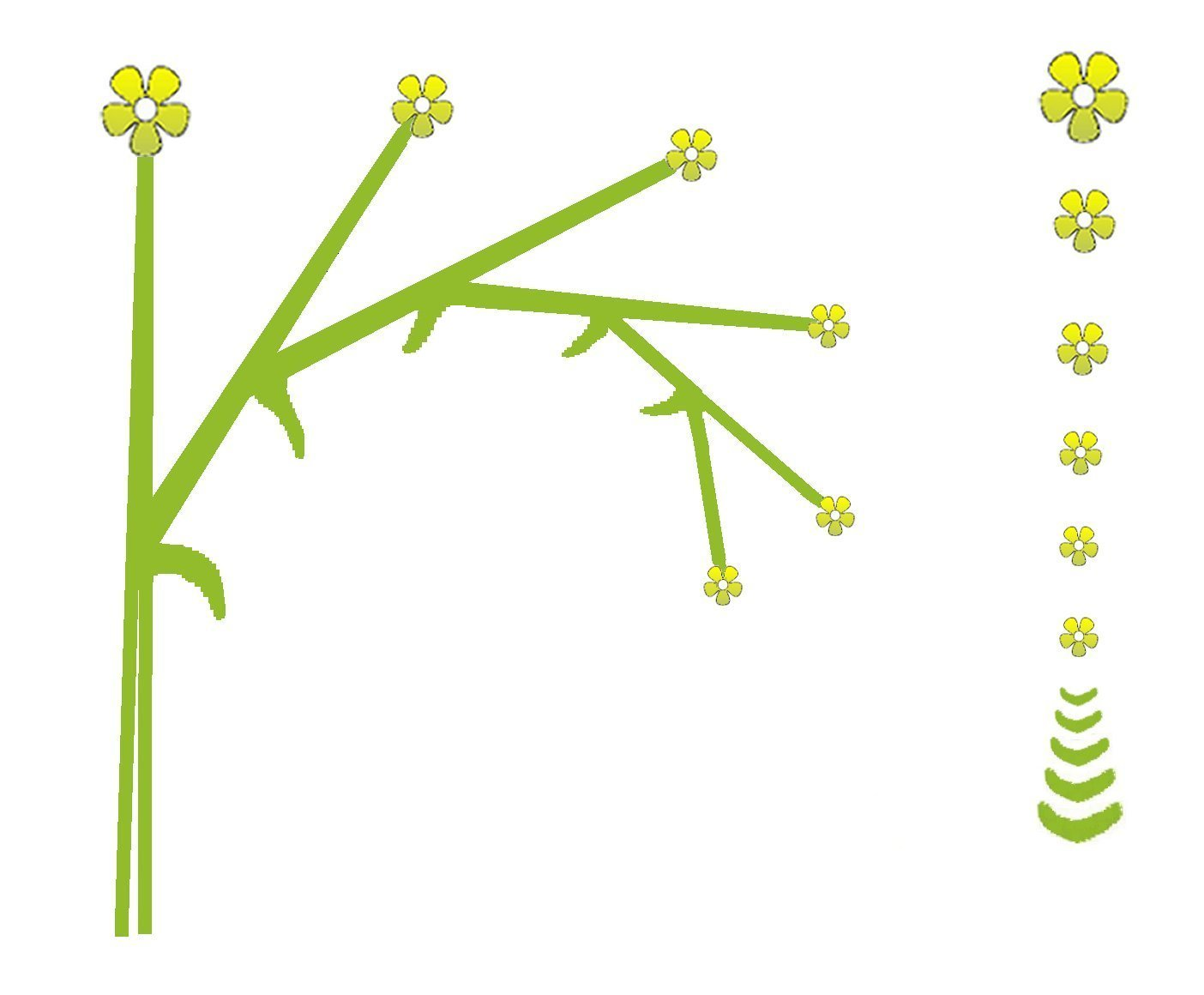
Drepanium (lateral and top view)

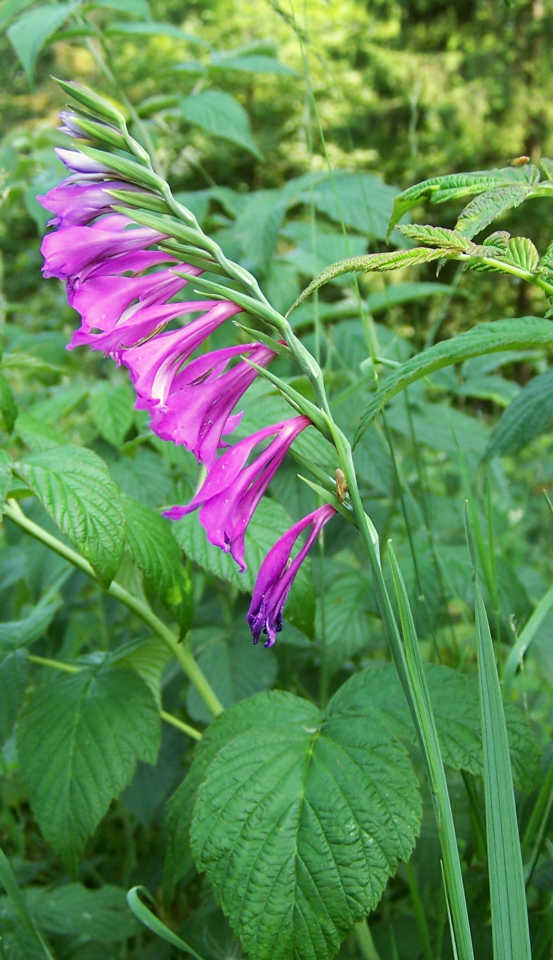
Gladiolus imbricatus (drepanium)

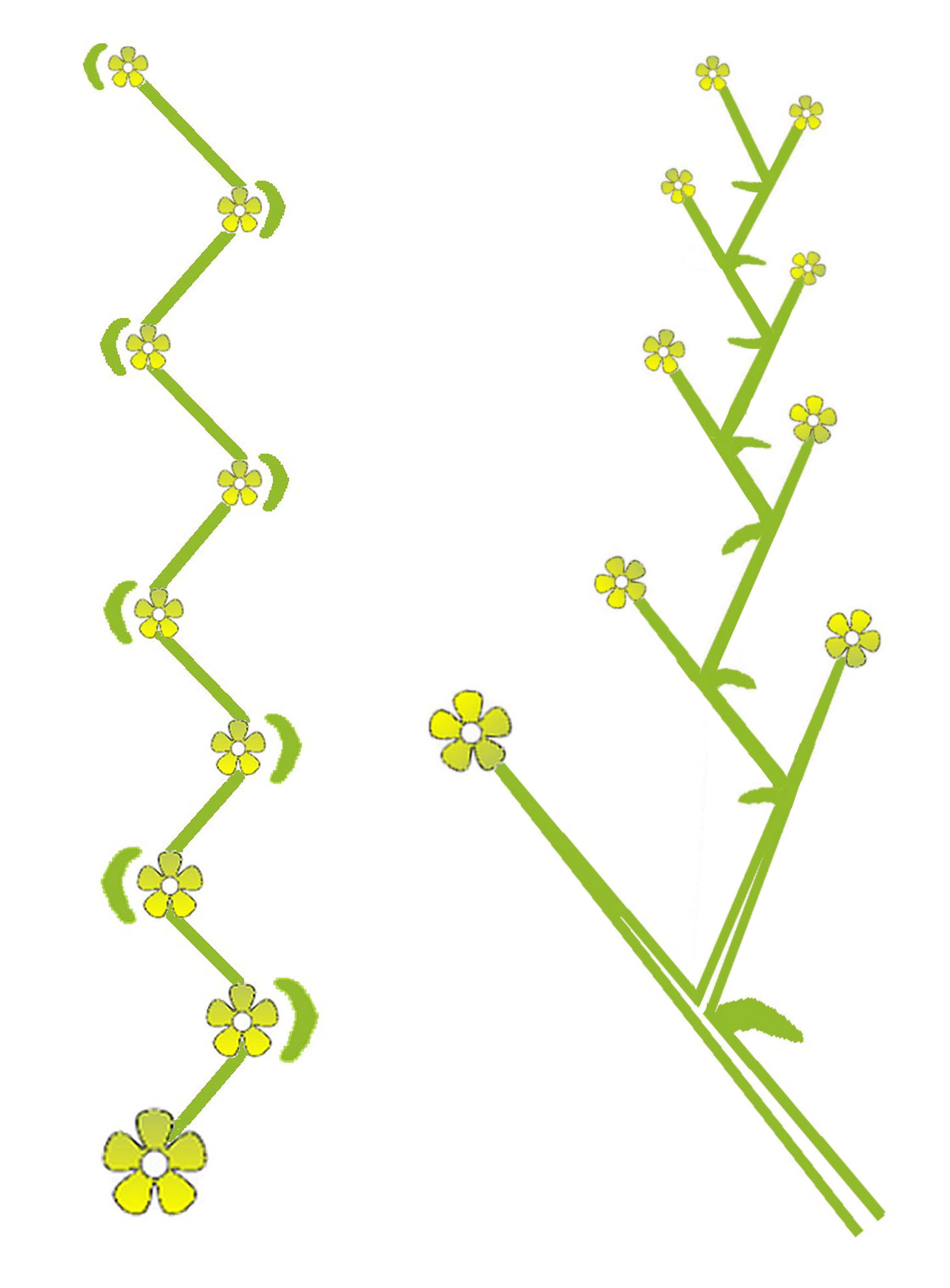
Cincinnus (lateral and top view)

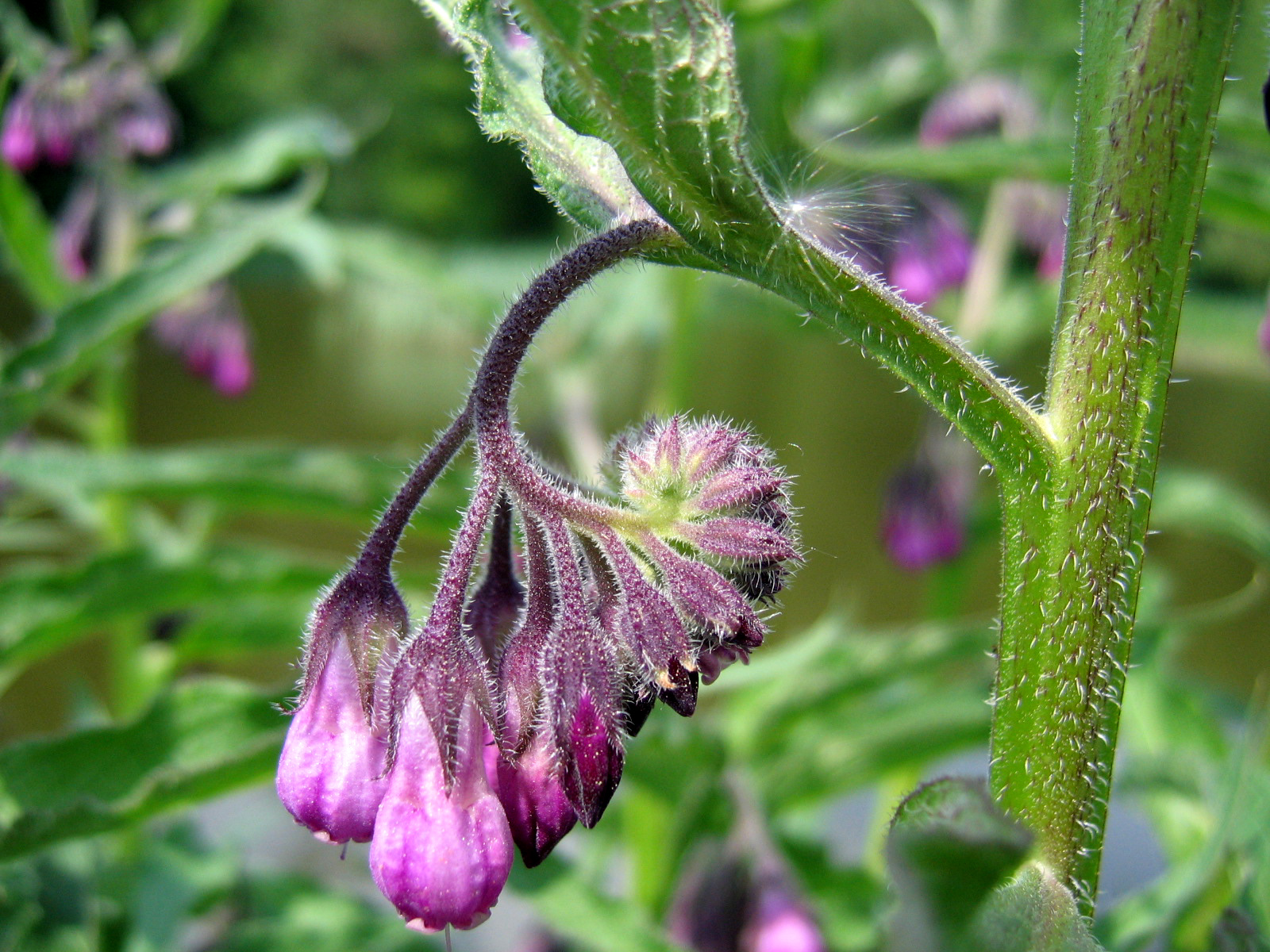
Symphytum officinale (cincinnus)

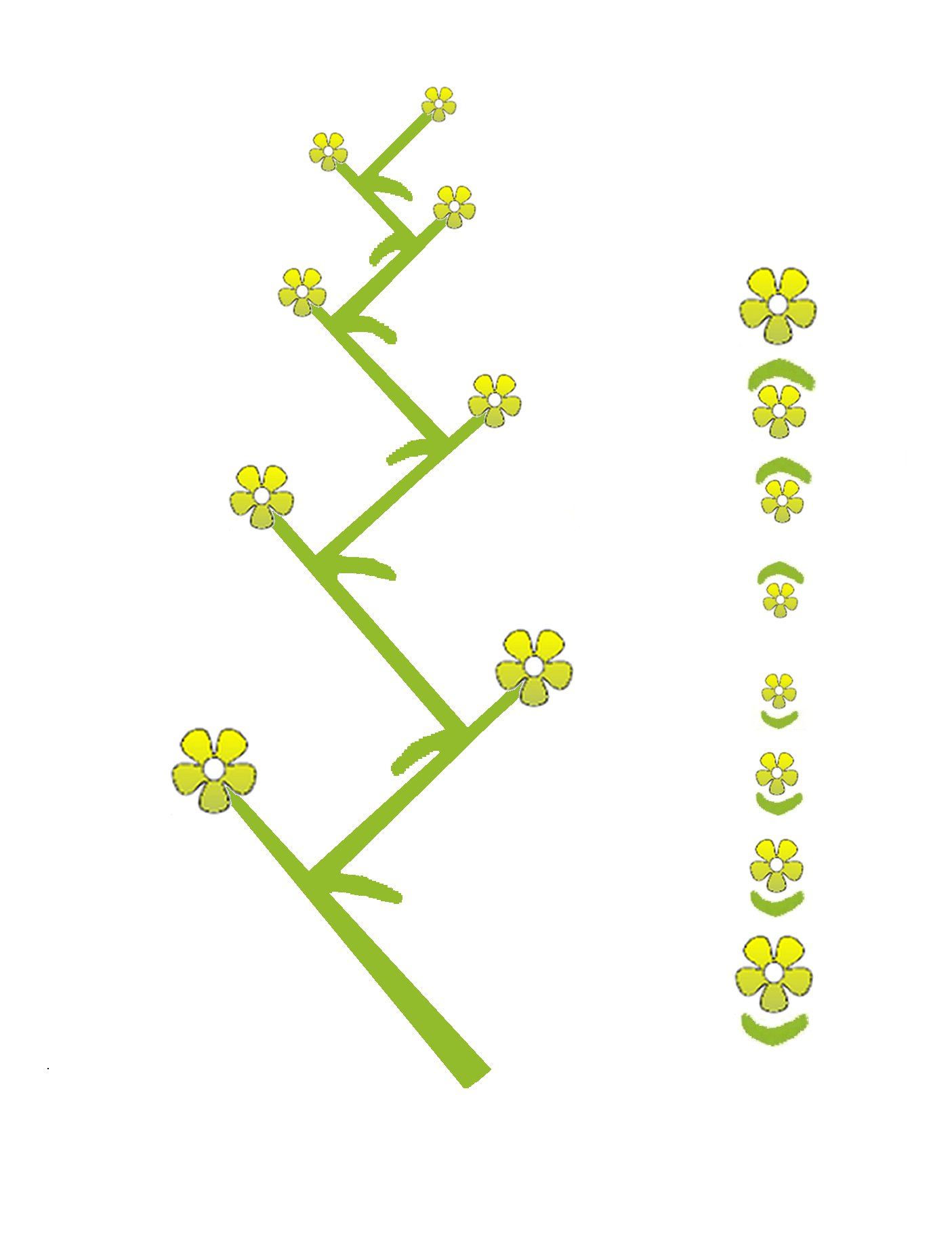
Rhipidium (lateral and top view)

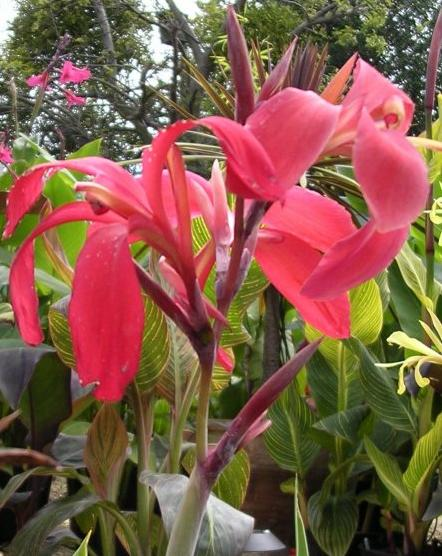
Canna sp. (rhipidium)

Dichasium

Dichasium, top view

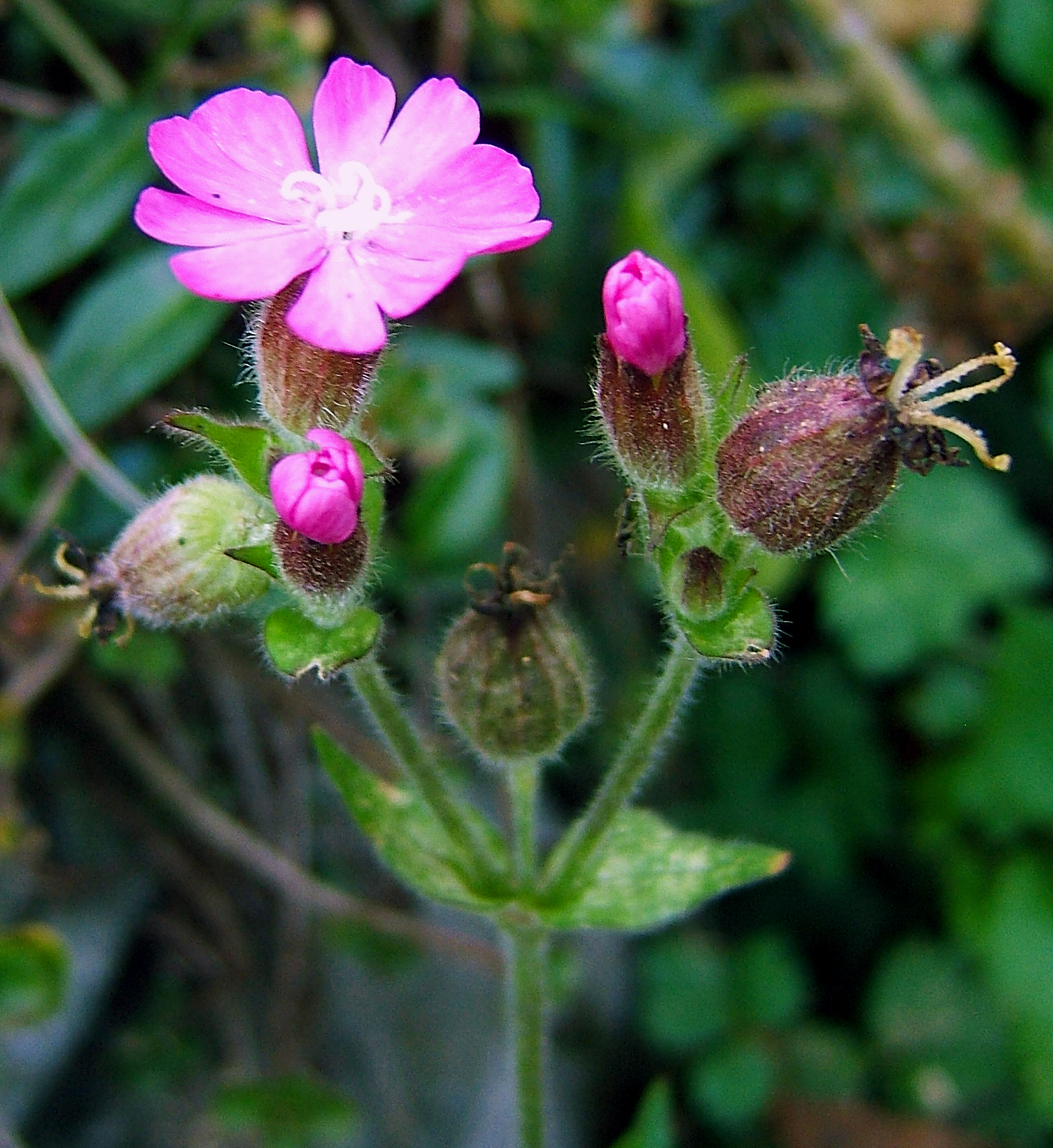
Silene dioica (dichasium)

A cyme can also be so compressed that it looks like an umbel. Strictly speaking this kind of inflorescence could be called umbelliform cyme, although it is normally called simply 'umbel'.

Another kind of definite simple inflorescence is the raceme-like cyme or botryoid; that is as a raceme with a terminal flower and is usually improperly called 'raceme'.

Umbelliform cyme

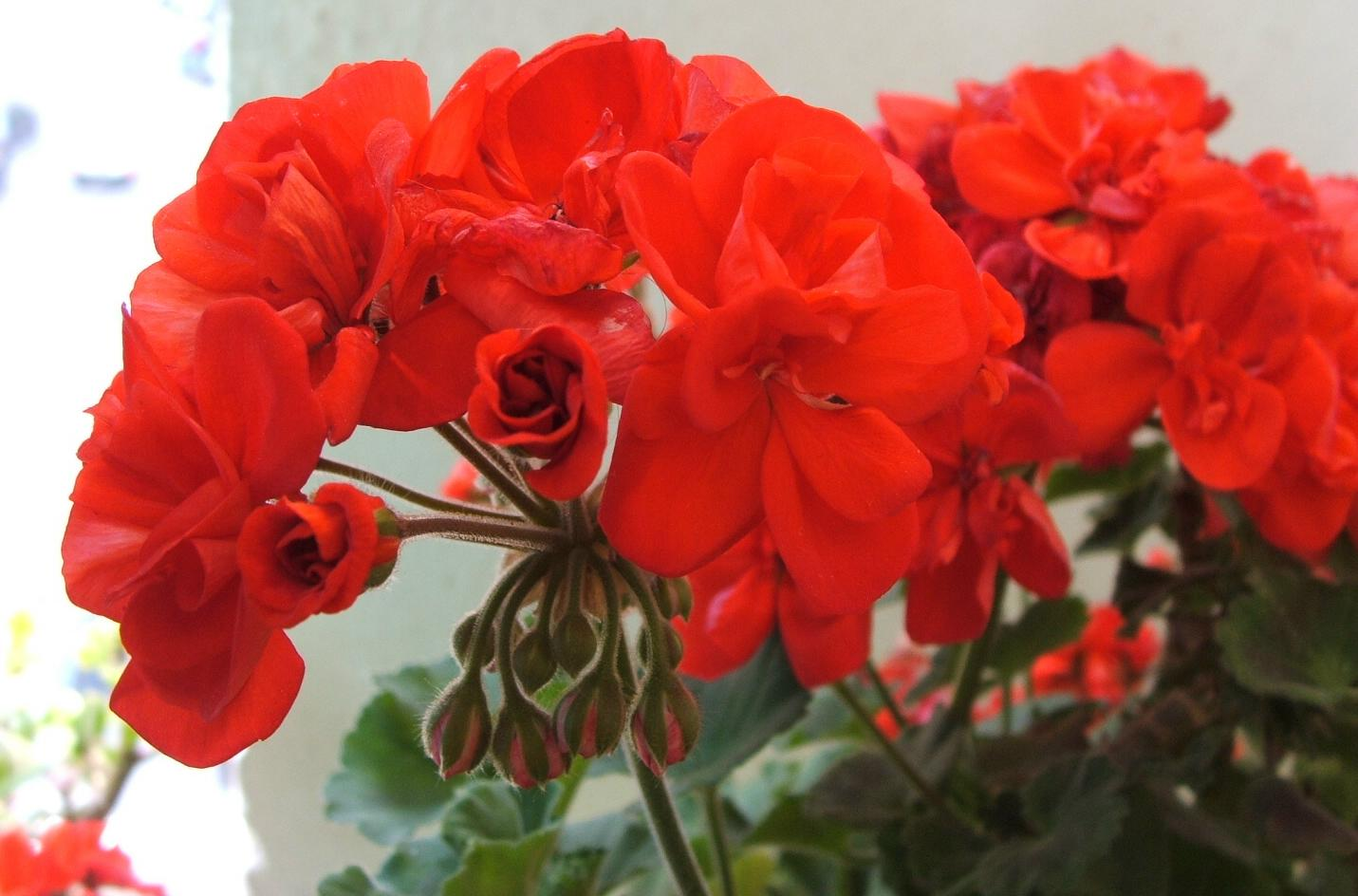
Pelargonium zonale (umbelliform cyme)

Botryoid

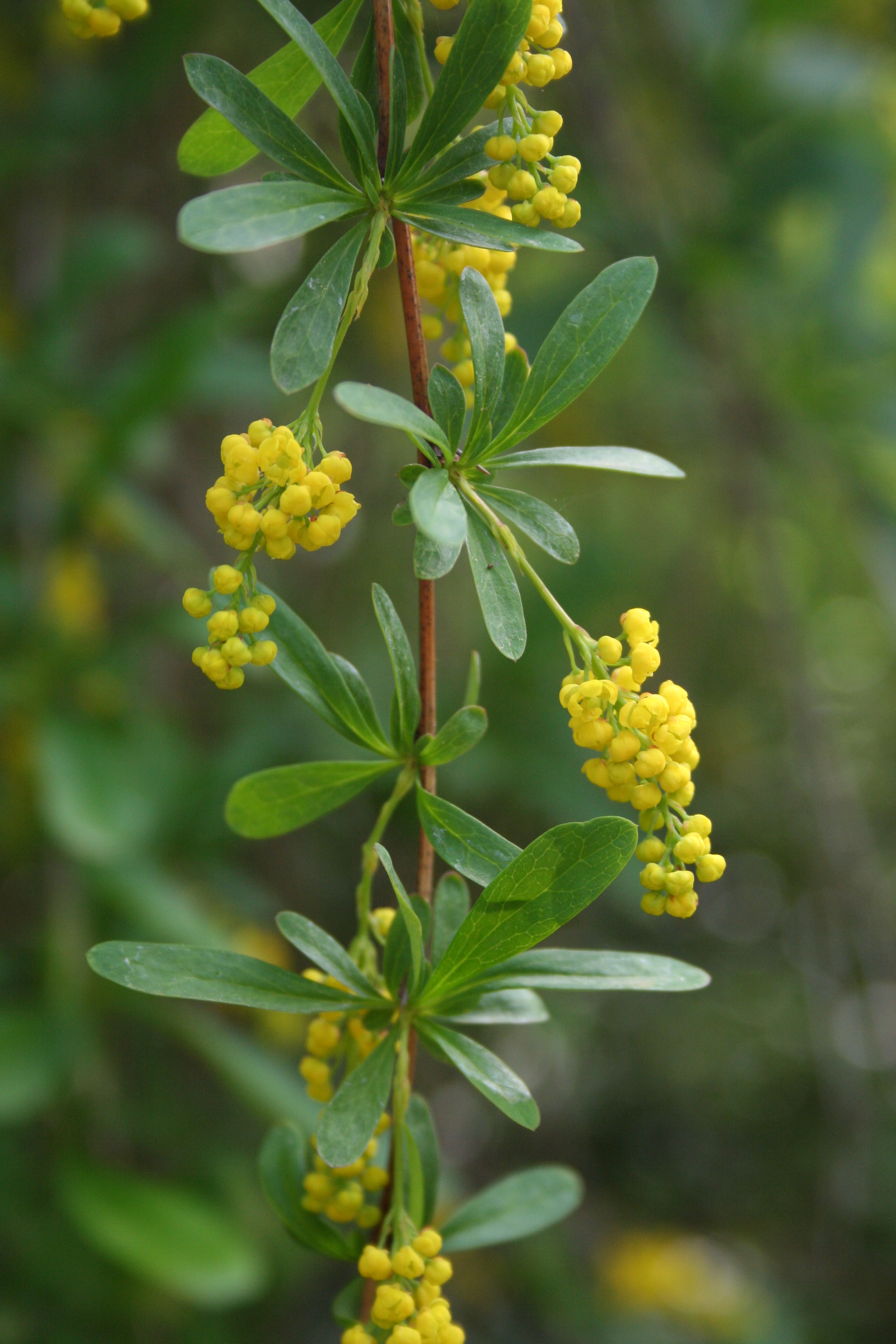
Berberis vernae (botryoid)

A reduced raceme or cyme that grows in the axil of a bract is called a fascicle. A verticillaster is a fascicle with the structure of a dichasium; it is common among the Lamiaceae. Many verticillasters with reduced bracts can form a spicate (spike-like) inflorescence that is commonly called a spike.

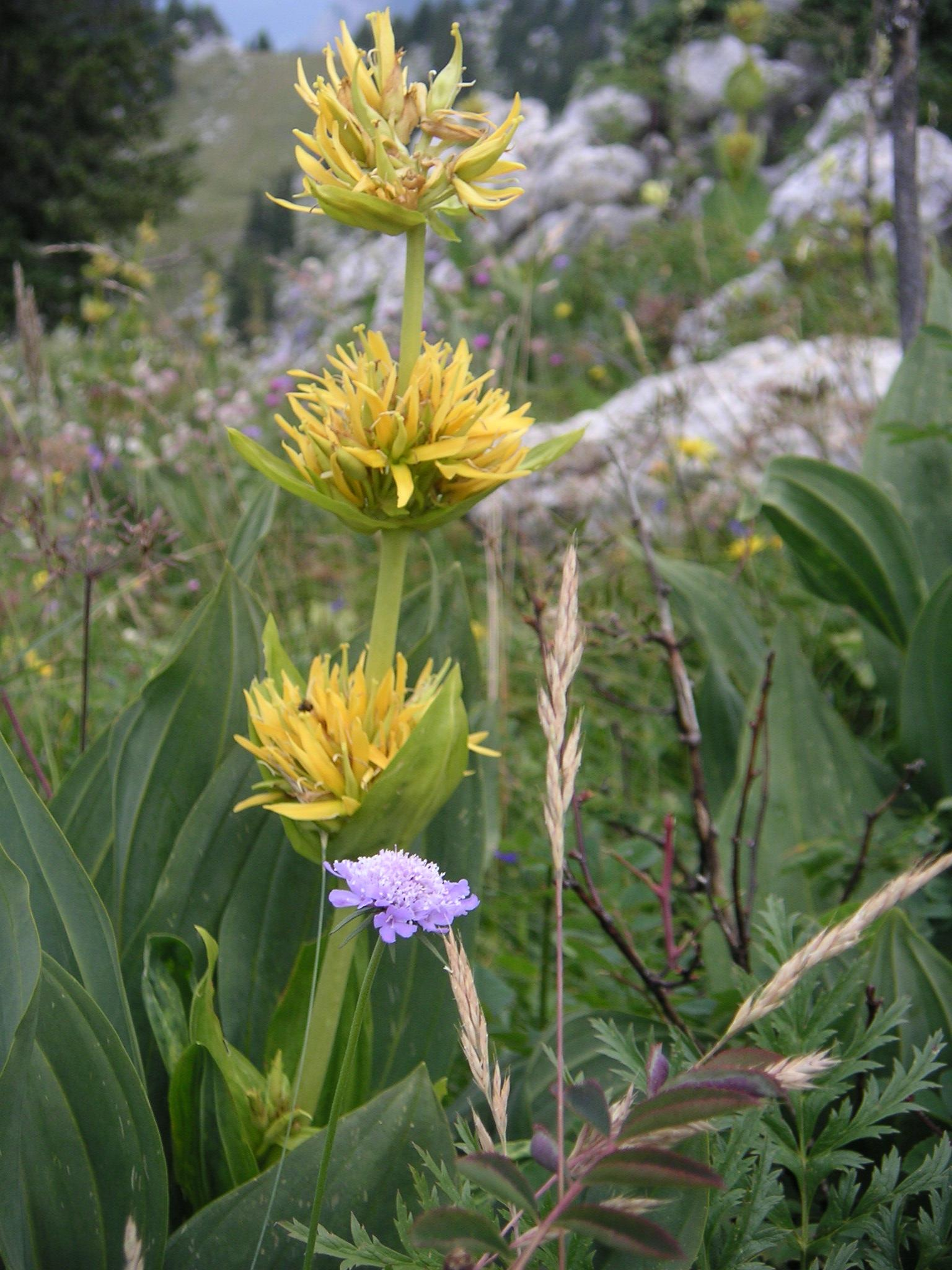
Gentiana lutea (fascicles)

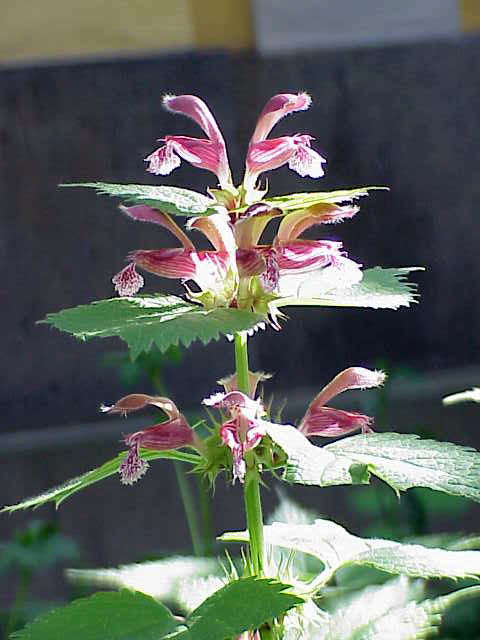
Lamium orvala (verticillaster)

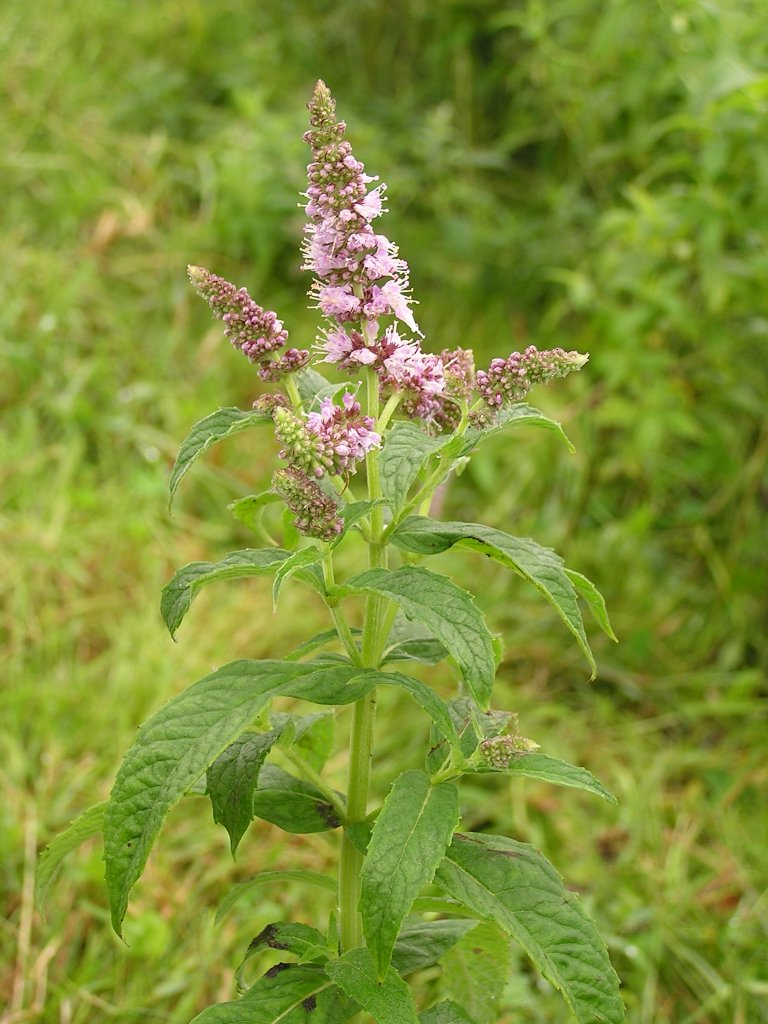
Mentha longifolia ('spike')

=== Compound inflorescences ===
Simple inflorescences are the basis for compound inflorescences or synflorescences. The single flowers are there replaced by a simple inflorescence, which can be both a racemose or a cymose one. Compound inflorescences are composed of branched stems and can involve complicated arrangements that are difficult to trace back to the main branch.

A kind of compound inflorescence is the double inflorescence, in which the basic structure is repeated in the place of single florets. For example, a double raceme is a raceme in which the single flowers are replaced by other simple racemes; the same structure can be repeated to form triple or more complex structures.

Compound raceme inflorescences can either end with a final raceme (homoeothetic), or not (heterothetic). A compound raceme is often called a panicle. This definition is very different from that given by Weberling.

Compound umbels are umbels in which the single flowers are replaced by many smaller umbels called umbellets. The stem attaching the side umbellets to the main stem is called a ray.

Homeothetic compound raceme

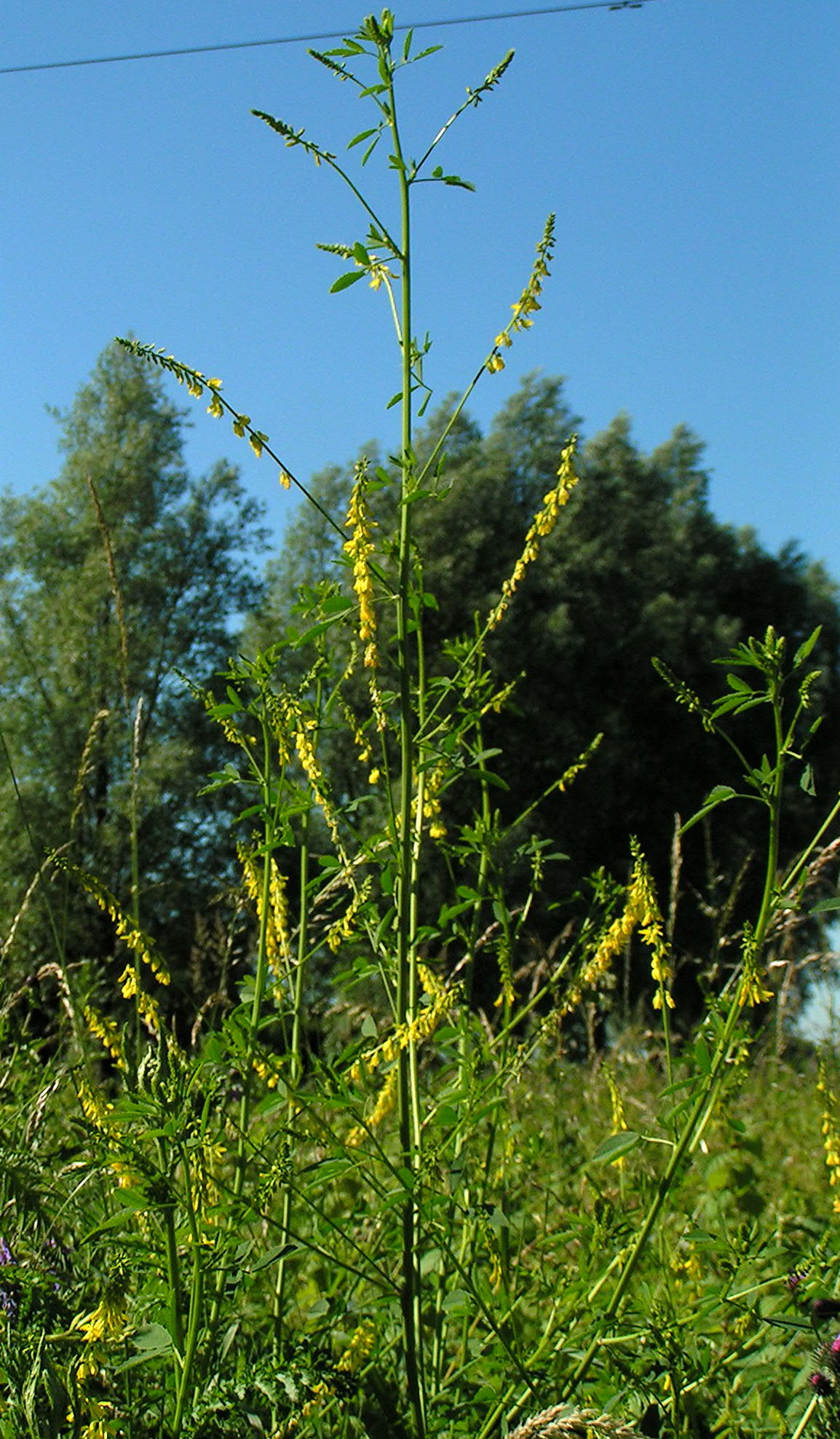
Melilotus officinalis (homoeothetic compound raceme)

Heterothetic compound raceme

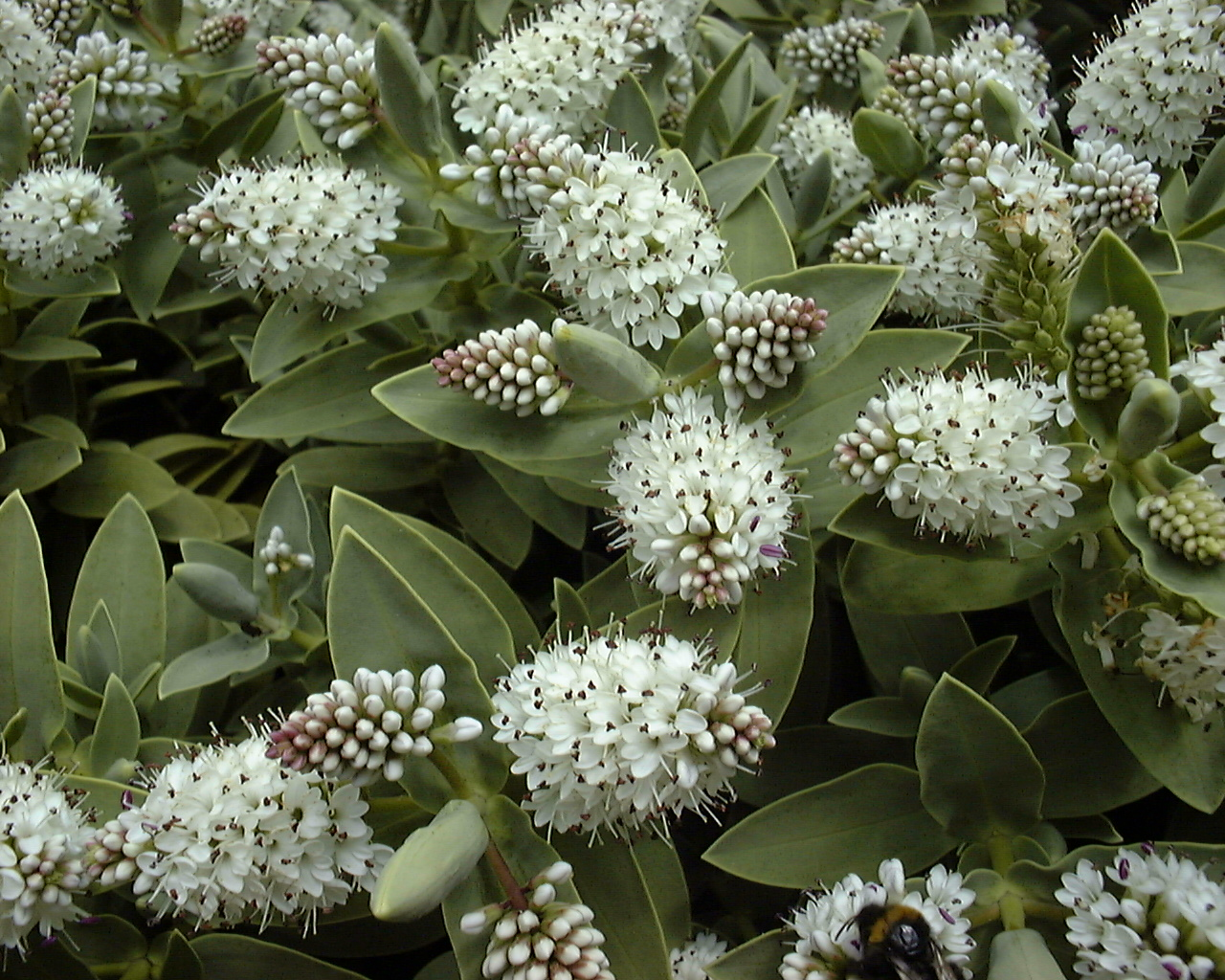
Veronica albicans (heterothetic compound raceme)

Compound spike

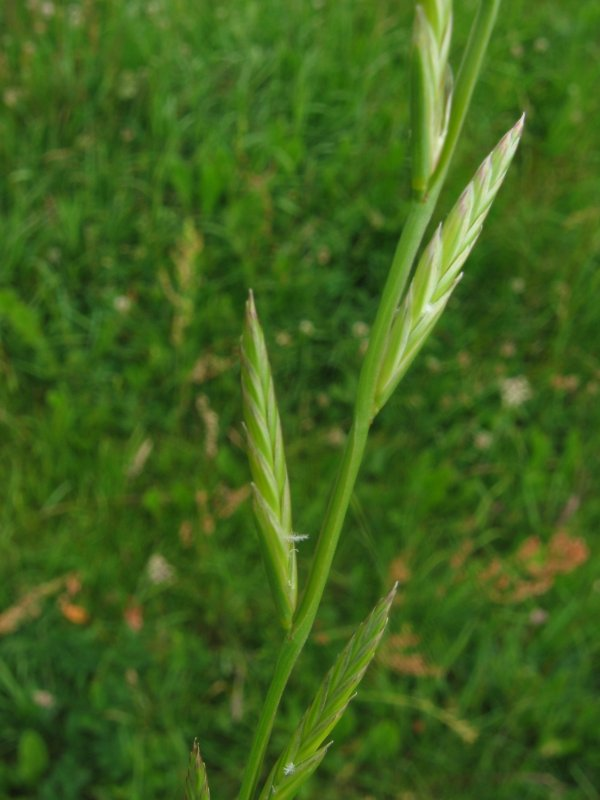
Lolium temulentum (compound spike)

Compound capitulum

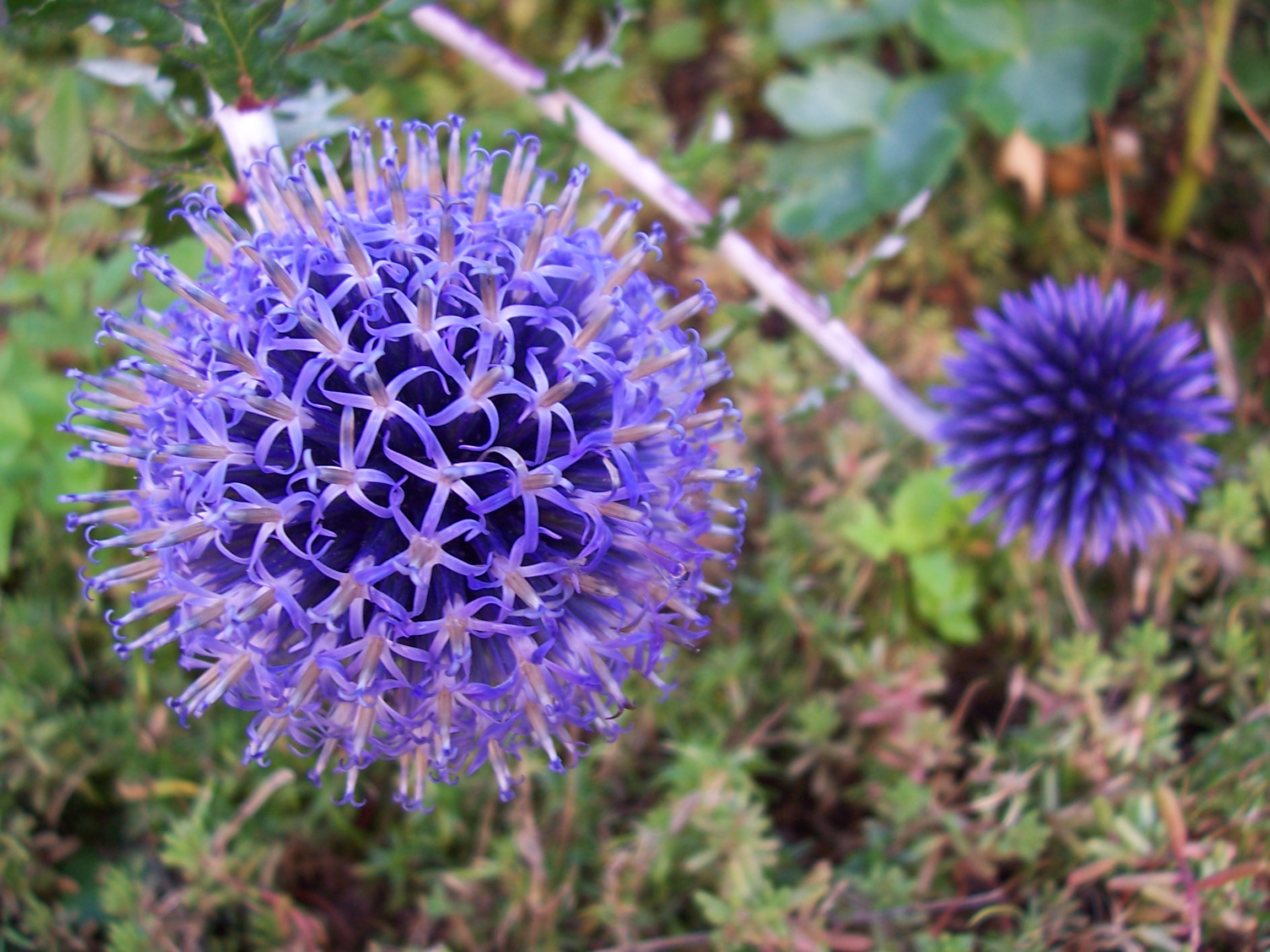
Echinops ritro (compound capitulum)

Compound (double) umbel

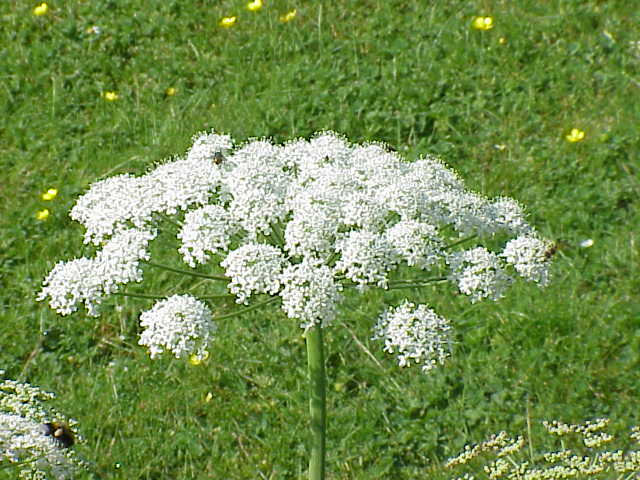
Laserpitium latifolium (double umbel)

Compound (triple) umbel

The most common kind of definite compound inflorescence is the panicle (of Webeling, or 'panicle-like cyme'). A panicle is a definite inflorescence that is increasingly more strongly and irregularly branched from the top to the bottom and where each branching has a terminal flower.

The so-called cymose corymb is similar to a racemose corymb but has a panicle-like structure. Another type of panicle is the anthela. An anthela is a cymose corymb with the lateral flowers higher than the central ones.

Panicle

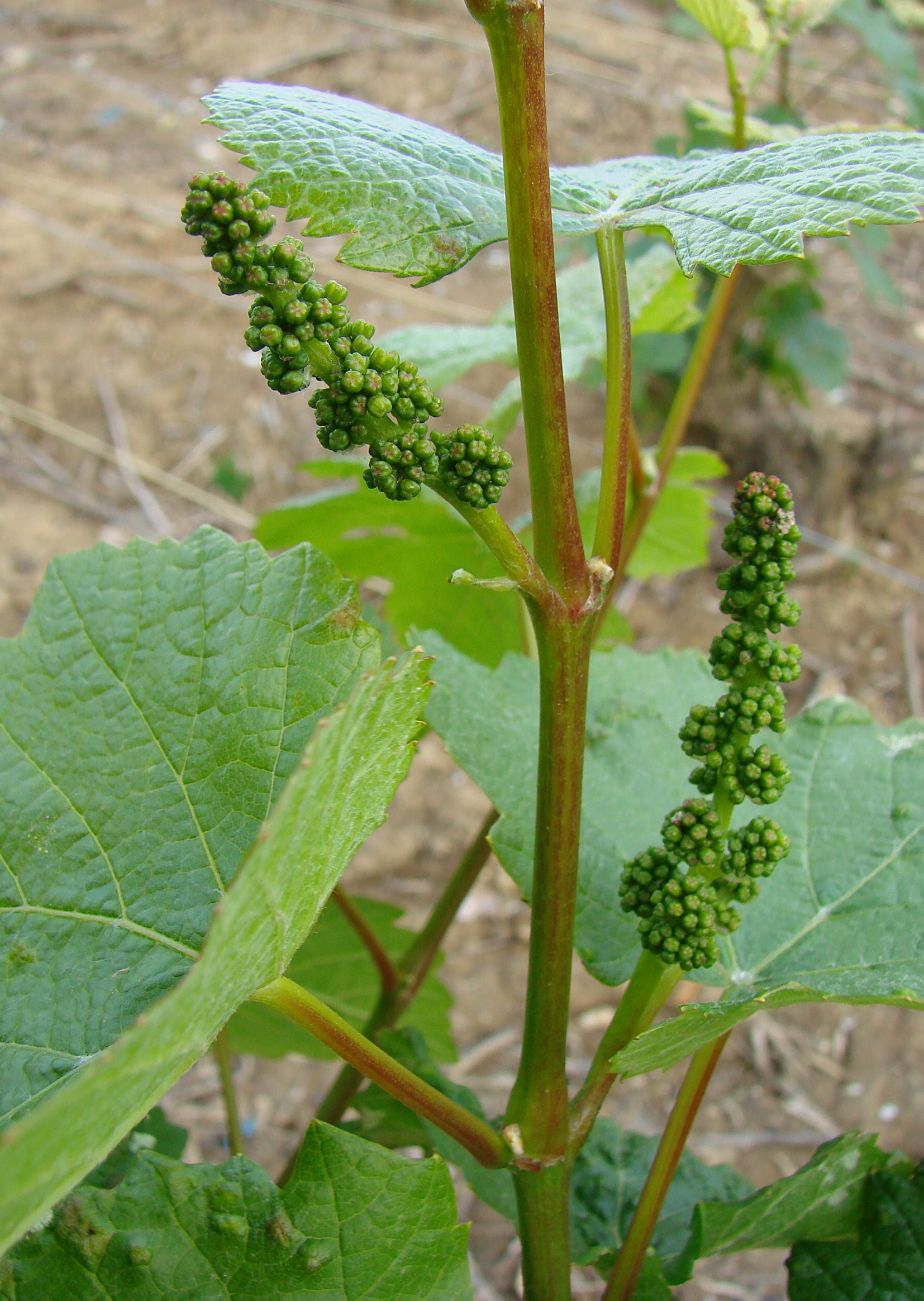
Vitis vinifera (panicle)

Cymose corymb

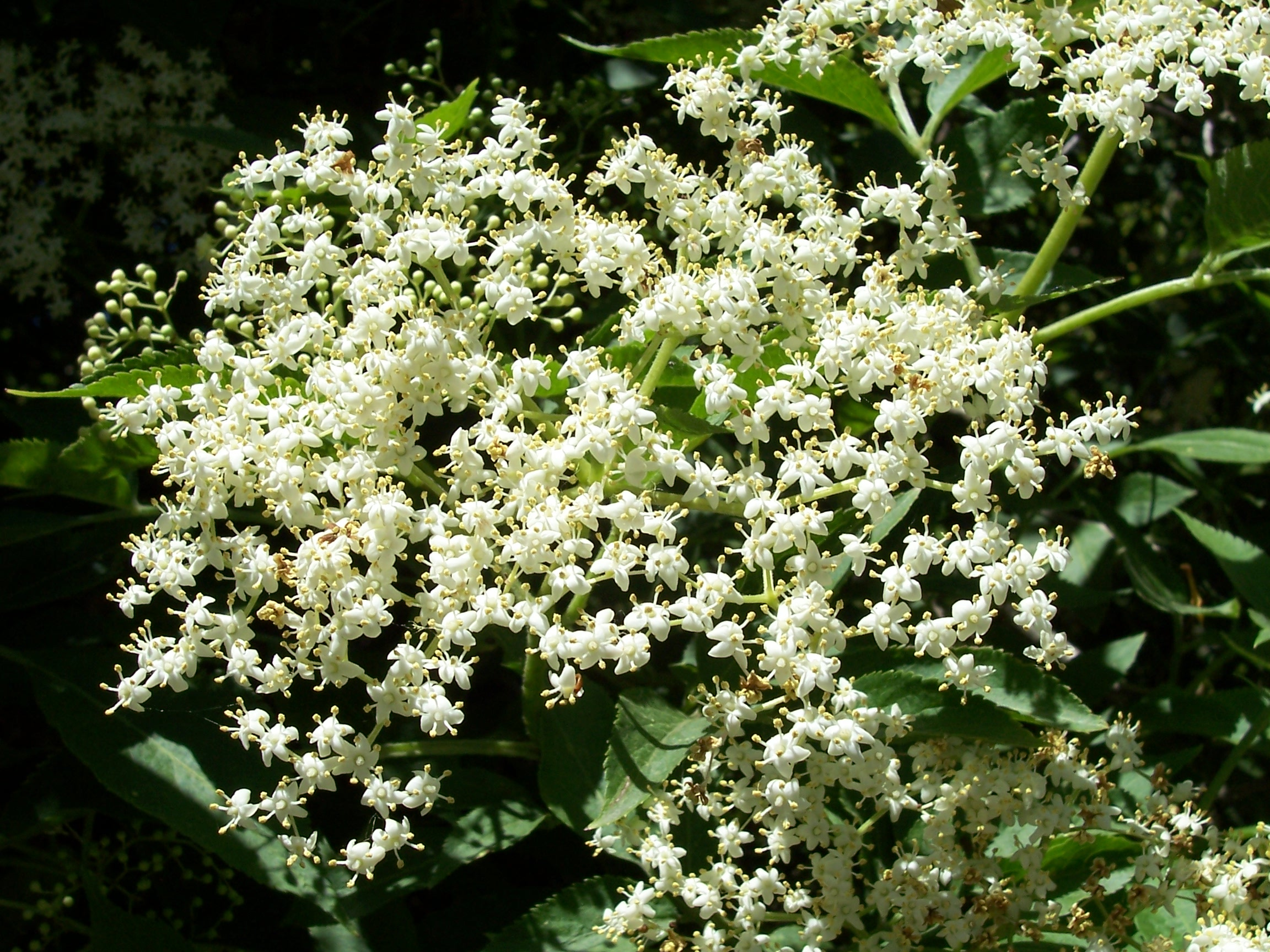
Sambucus nigra (cymose corymb)

Anthela

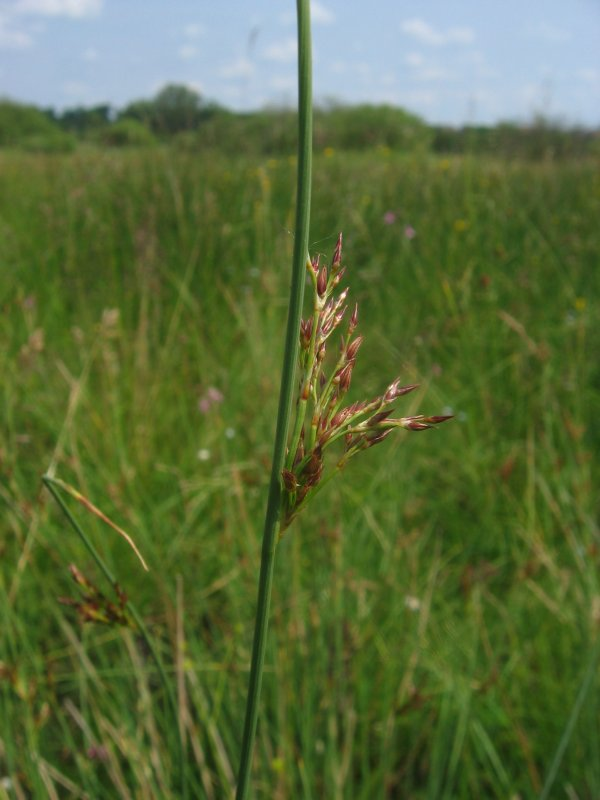
Juncus inflexus (anthela)

A raceme in which the single flowers are replaced by cymes is called a (indefinite) thyrse. The secondary cymes can be of any of the different types of dichasia and monochasia. A botryoid in which the single flowers are replaced by cymes is a definite thyrse or thyrsoid. Thyrses are often confusingly called panicles.

Thyrse

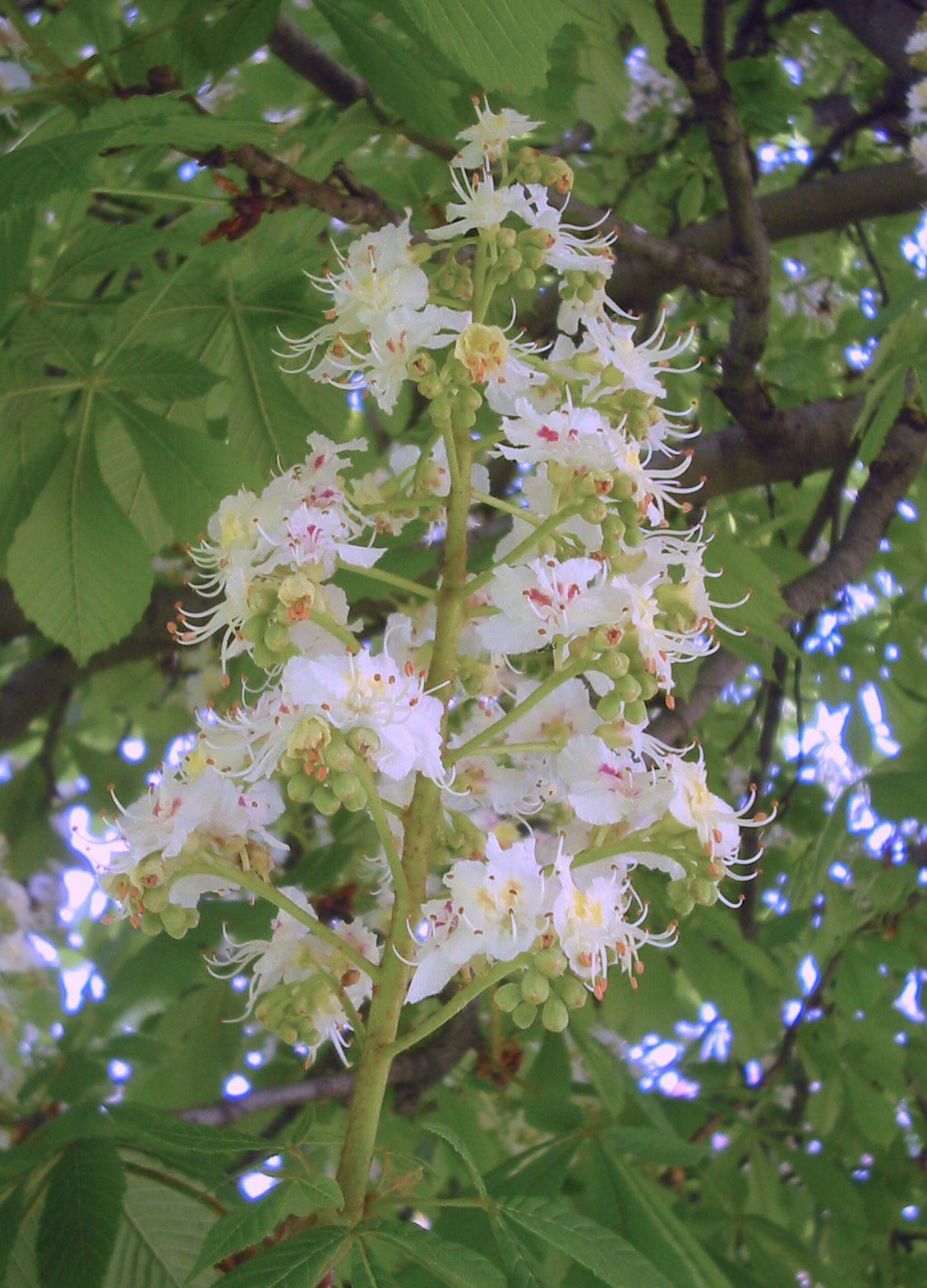
Aesculus hippocastanum

Thyrsoid

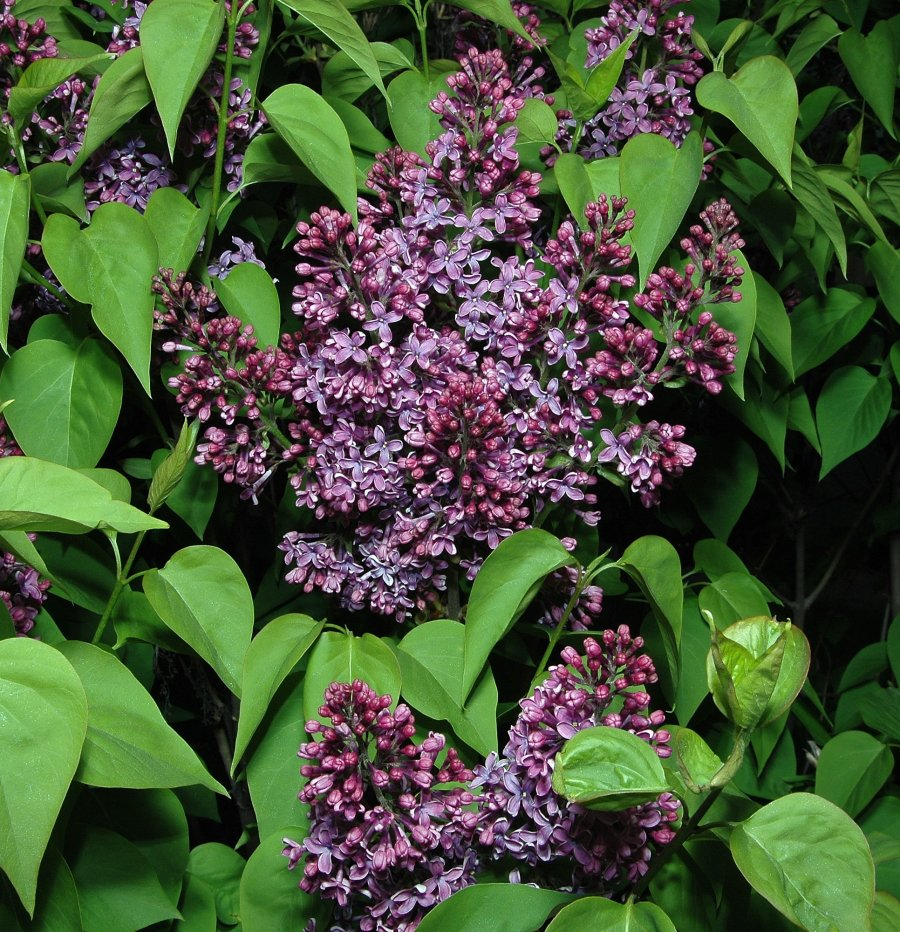
Syringa vulgaris

Other combinations are possible. For example, heads or umbels may be arranged in a corymb or a panicle.

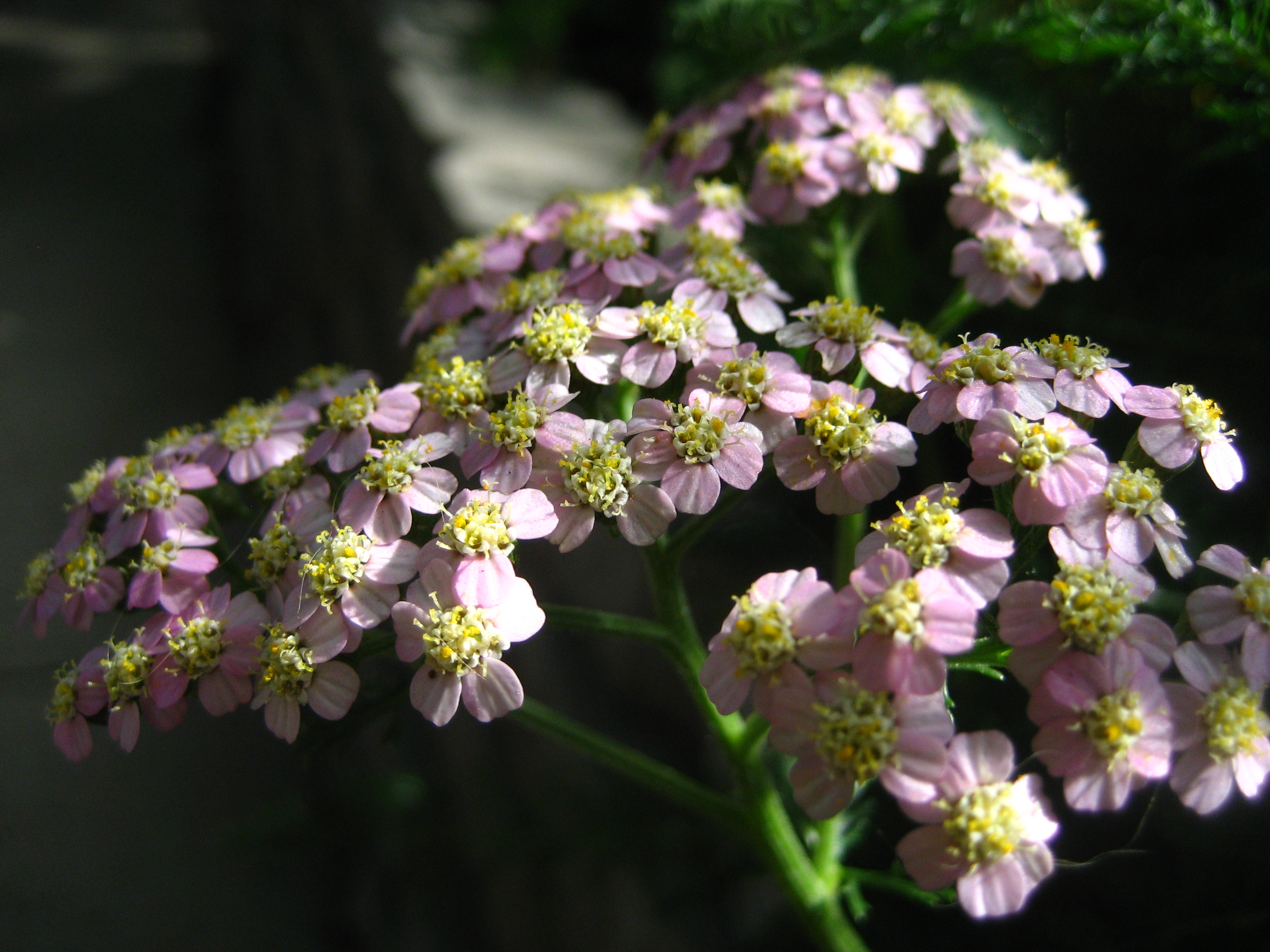
Achillea sp. (heads in a corymb)

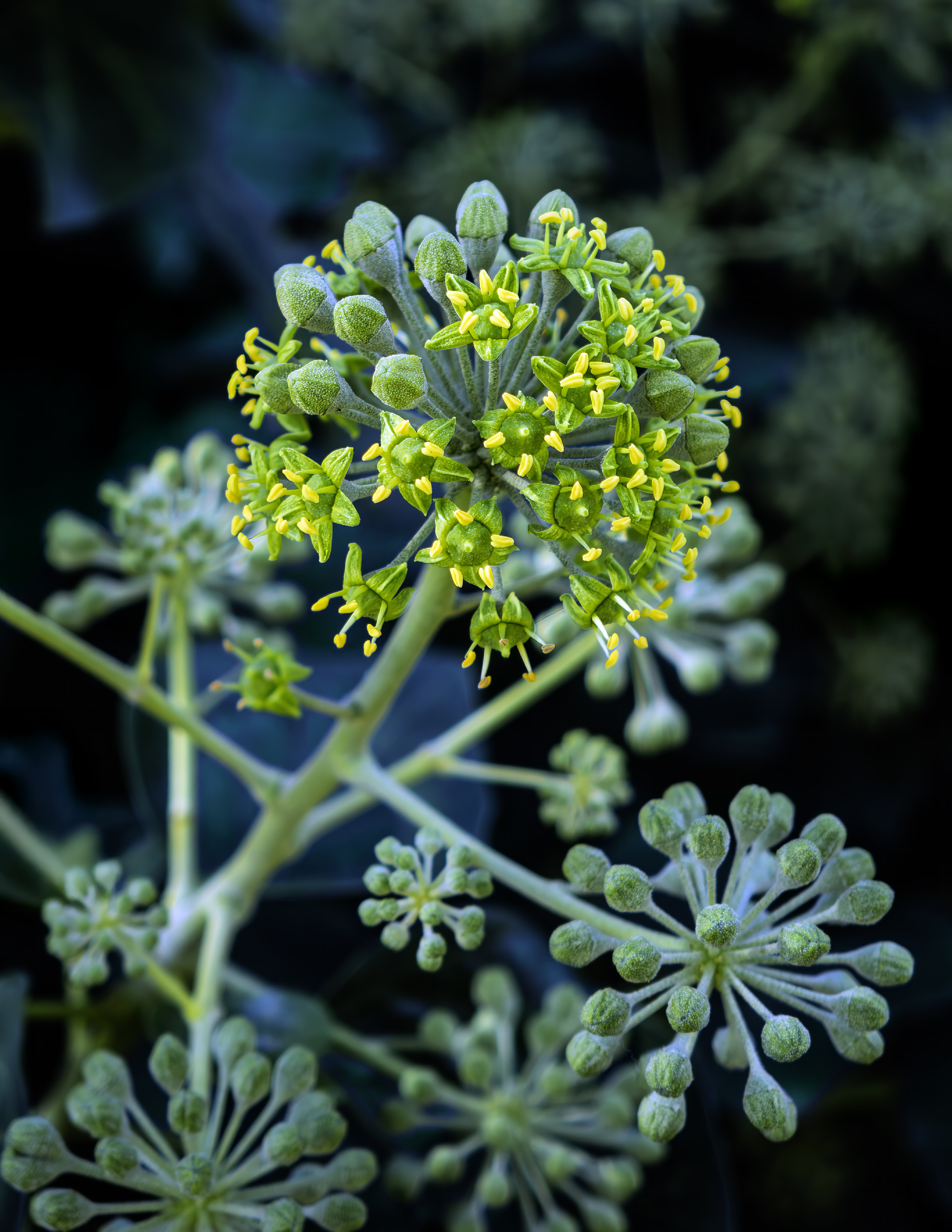
Hedera helix (umbels in a panicle)

=== Other ===
The family Asteraceae is characterised by a highly specialised head technically called a calathid (but usually referred to as 'capitulum' or 'head'). The family Poaceae has a peculiar inflorescence of small spikes (spikelets) organised in panicles or spikes that are usually simply and improperly referred to as spike and panicle. The genus Ficus (Moraceae) has an inflorescence called a hypanthodium, which bears numerous flowers on the inside of a convex or involuted compound receptacle. The genus Euphorbia has cyathia (sing. cyathium), usually organised in umbels.

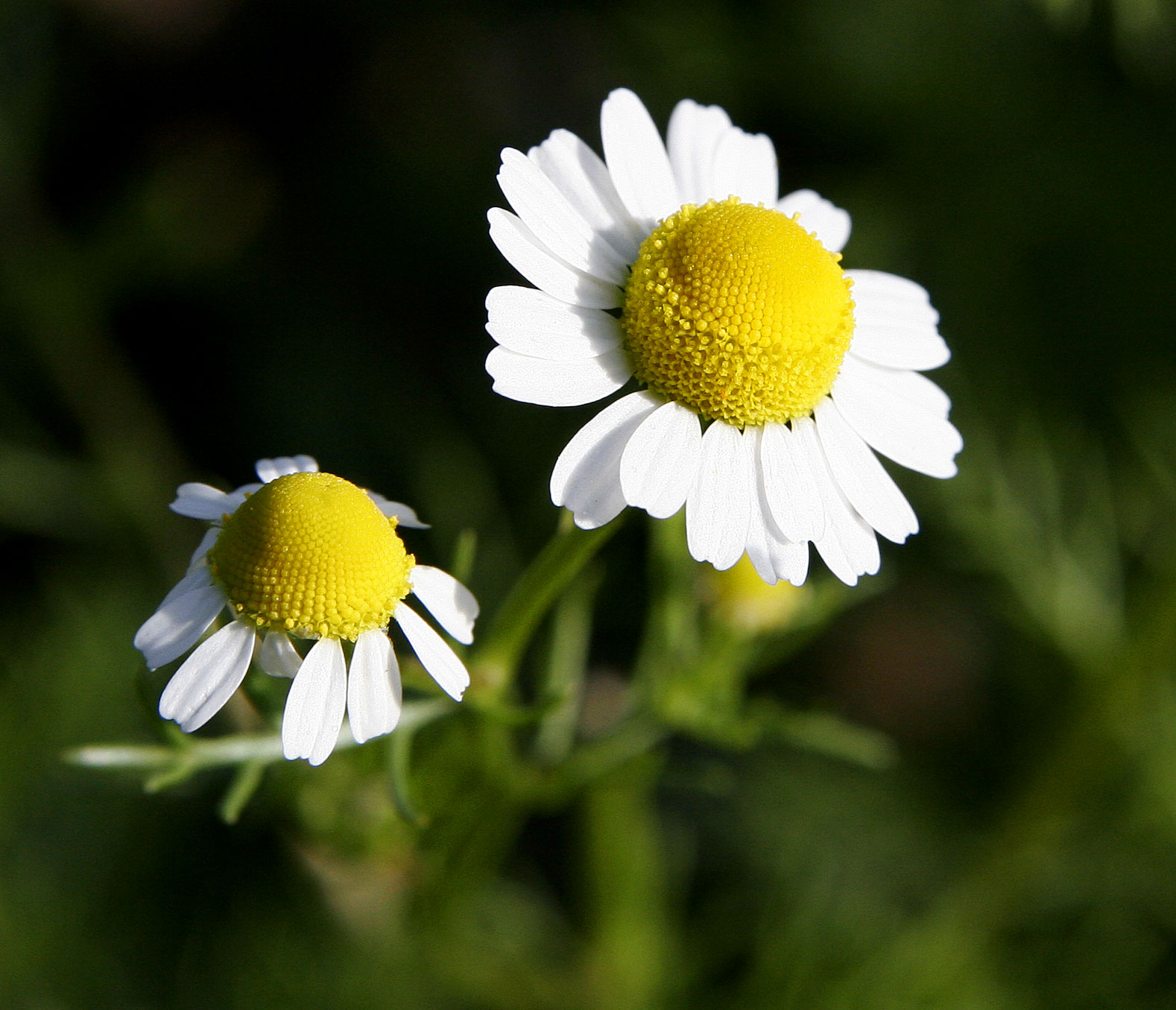
Matricaria chamomilla (calathid)

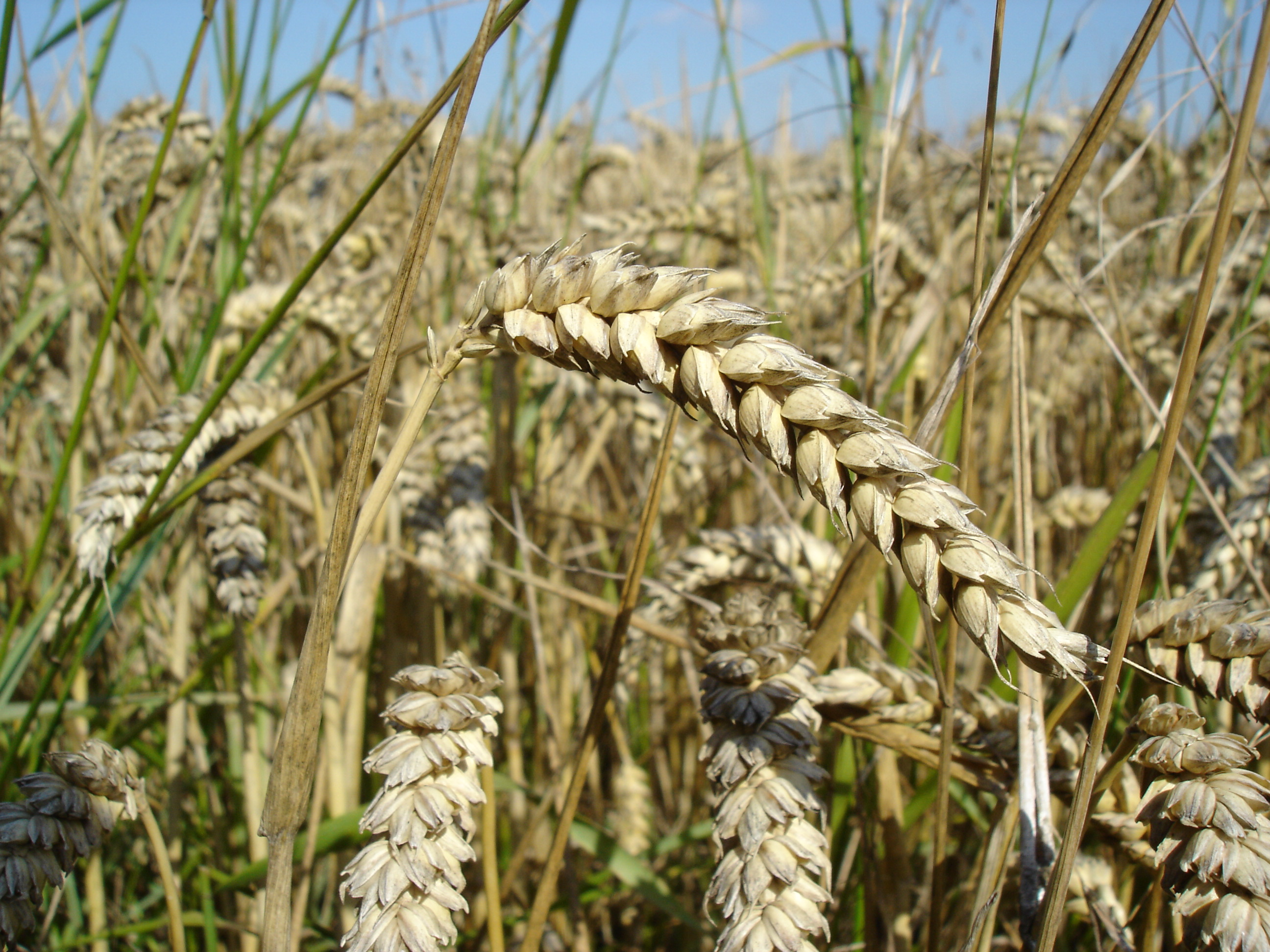
Triticum aestivum (compound spikes, "spikes")

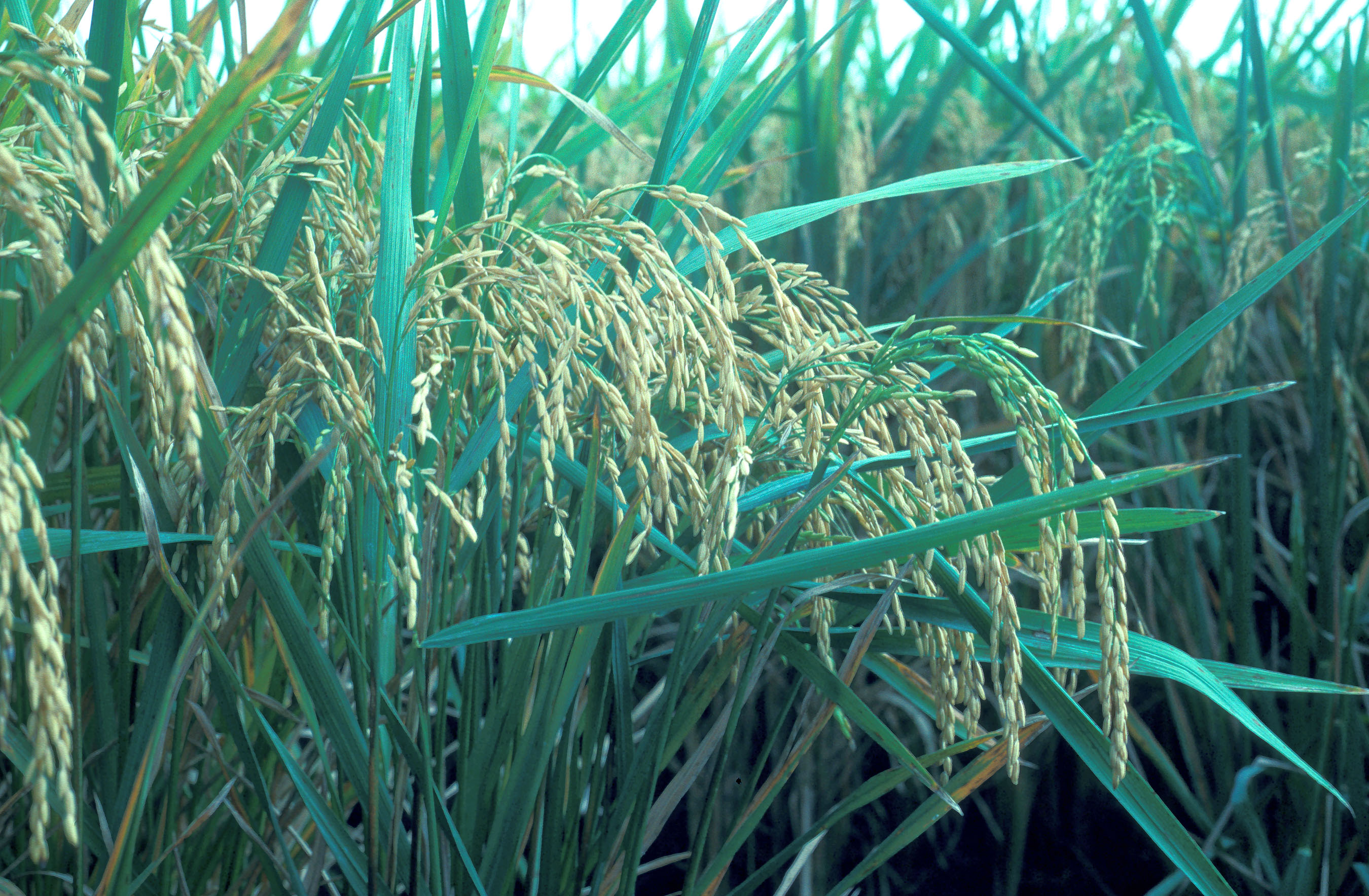
Oryza sativa (spikes in a panicle, "panicle")

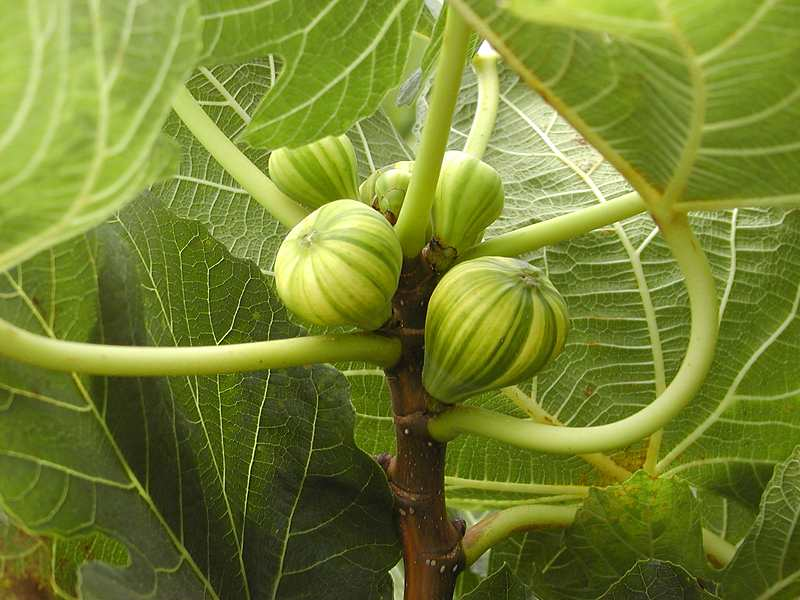
Ficus carica (hypanthodium)

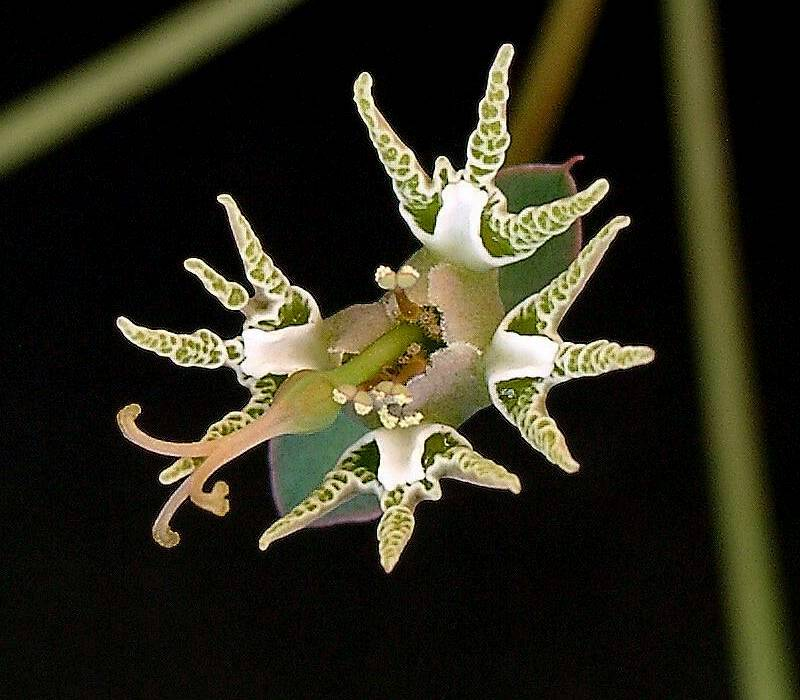
Euphorbia tridentata (cyathium)

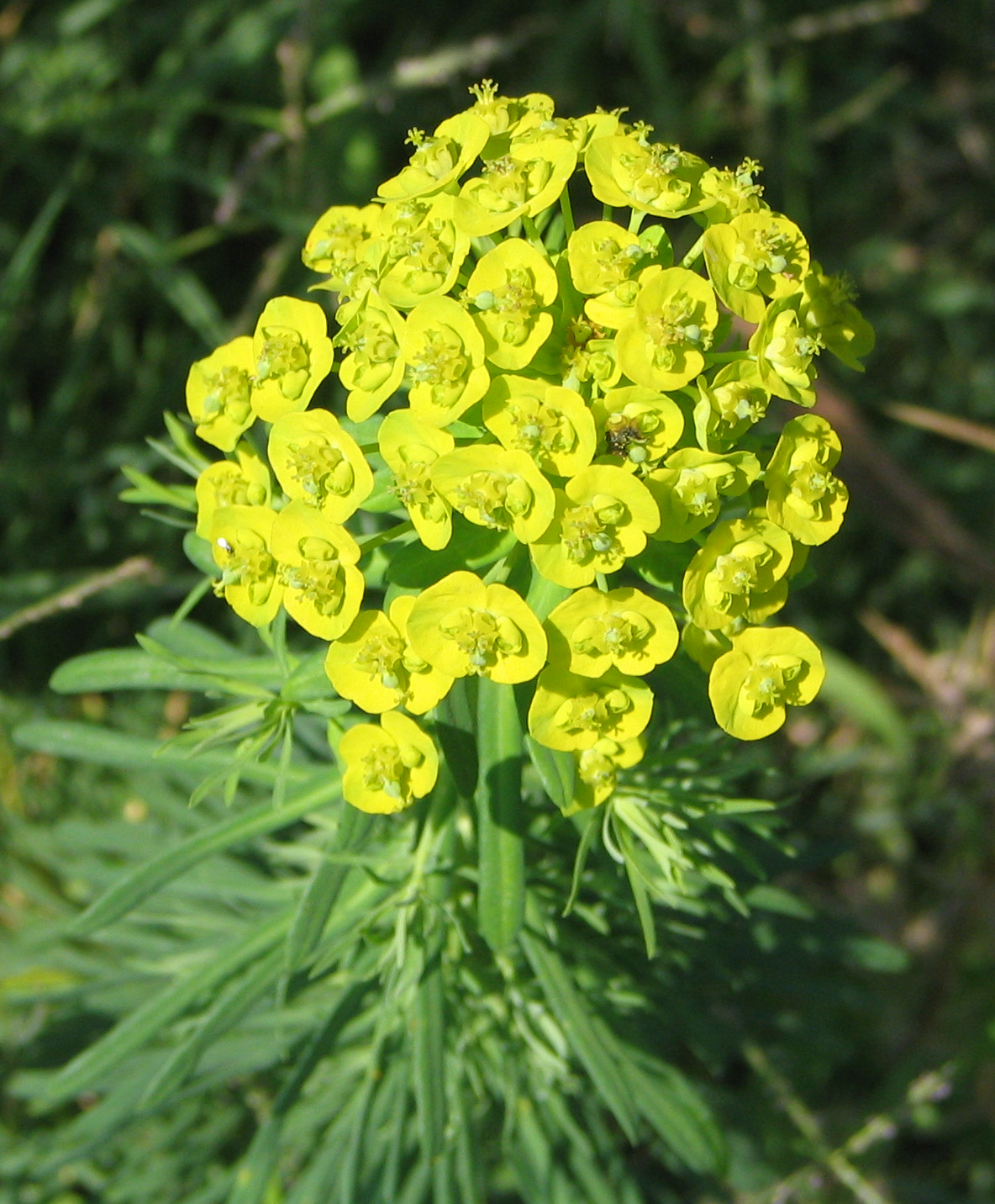
Euphorbia cyparissias (cyathia in an umbel)

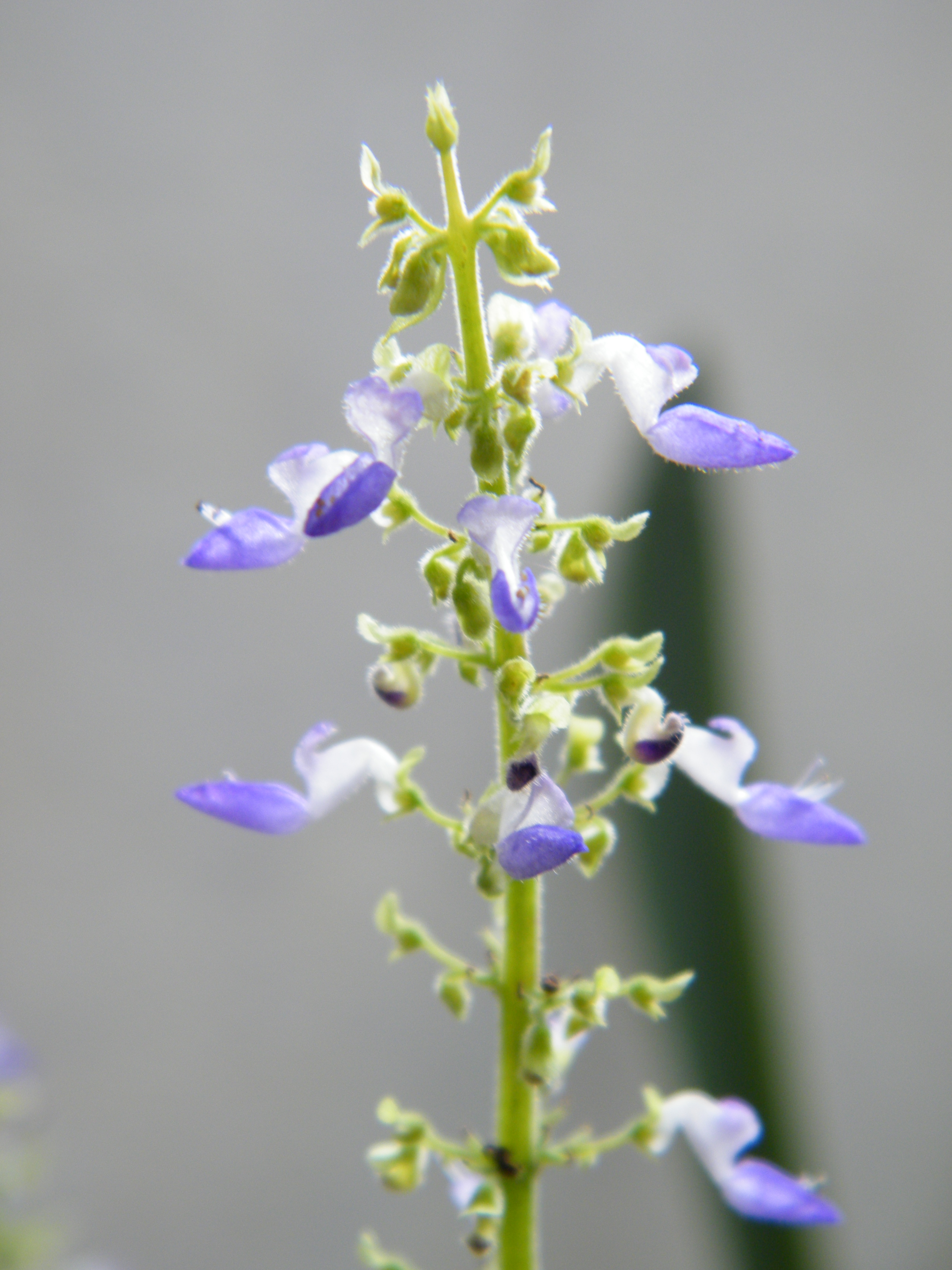
Coleus (false spike)

Some species have inflorescences reduced to composite flowers or pseudanthia, in which case it is difficult to differentiate between inflorescences and single flowers.

== Development and patterning ==
=== Development ===
==== Genetic basis ====
Genes that shape inflorescence development have been studied at great length in Arabidopsis. LEAFY (LFY) is a gene that promotes floral meristem identity, regulating inflorescence development in Arabidopsis. Any alterations in timing of LFY expression can cause formation of different inflorescences in the plant. Genes similar in function to LFY include APETALA1 (AP1). Mutations in LFY, AP1, and similar promoting genes can cause conversion of flowers into shoots. In contrast to LEAFY, genes like terminal flower (TFL) support the activity of an inhibitor that prevents flowers from growing on the inflorescence apex (flower primordium initiation), maintaining inflorescence meristem identity. Both types of genes help shape flower development in accordance with the ABC model of flower development. Studies have been recently conducted or are ongoing for homologs of these genes in other flower species.

==== Environmental influences ====
Inflorescence-feeding insect herbivores shape inflorescences by reducing lifetime fitness (how much flowering occurs), seed production by the inflorescences, and plant density, among other traits. In the absence of these herbivores, inflorescences usually produce more flower heads and seeds. Temperature can also variably shape inflorescence development. High temperatures can impair the proper development of flower buds or delay bud development in certain species, while in others an increase in temperature can hasten inflorescence development.

=== Meristems and inflorescence architecture ===
The shift from the vegetative to reproductive phase of a flower involves the development of an inflorescence meristem that generates floral meristems. Plant inflorescence architecture depends on which meristems becomes flowers and which become shoots. Consequently, genes that regulate floral meristem identity play major roles in determining inflorescence architecture because their expression domain will direct where the plant's flowers are formed.

On a larger scale, inflorescence architecture affects quality and quantity of offspring from selfing and outcrossing, as the architecture can influence pollination success. For example, Asclepias inflorescences have been shown to have an upper size limit, shaped by self-pollination levels due to crosses between inflorescences on the same plant or between flowers on the same inflorescence. In Aesculus sylvatica, it has been shown that the most common inflorescence sizes are correlated with the highest fruit production as well.

== Bibliography ==
- Focko Weberling: Morphologie der Blüten und der Blütenstände; Zweiter Teil. Verlag Eugen Ulmer, Stuttgart 1981
- Wilhelm Troll: Die Infloreszenzen; Erster Band. Gustav Fischer Verlag, Stuttgart 1964
- Wilhelm Troll: Die Infloreszenzen; Zweiter Band, Erster Teil. Gustav Fischer Verlag, Stuttgart 1969
- Wilhelm Troll: Praktische Einführung in die Pflanzenmorphologie. Gustav Fischer Verlag, Jena 1957
- Bernhard Kausmann: Pflanzenanatomie. Gustav Fischer Verlag, Jena 1963
- Walter S. Judd, Christopher S. Campbell, Elizabeth A. Kellogg, Peter F. Stevens, Michael J. Donoghue: Plant Systematics: A Phylogenetic Approach, Sinauer Associates Inc. 2007
- Stevens, P. F. (2001 onwards). Angiosperm Phylogeny Website . Version 7, May 2006 [and more or less continuously updated since].
- Strasburger, Noll, Schenck, Schimper: Lehrbuch der Botanik für Hochschulen. 4. Auflage, Gustav Fischer, Jena 1900, p. 459
- R J Ferry. Inflorescences and Their Names. The McAllen International Orchid Society Journal.Vol. 12(6), pp. 4-11 June 2011
