= Meadowsweet =

Meadowsweet may refer to:

== Plants ==
- Filipendula or meadowsweets, a plant genus
  - Filipendula ulmaria or meadowsweet, native to Europe and western Asia
  - Filipendula rubra or prairie meadowsweet, native to North America
- Spiraea or meadowsweets, a plant genus of the Northern Hemisphere
  - Spiraea alba or meadowsweet, native to eastern North America
  - Spiraea japonica or Japanese meadowsweet
  - Spiraea tomentosa or meadowsweet, native to the United States and Canada
  - Spiraea trilobata or Asian meadosweet
  - Spiraea virginiana or Virginia meadowsweet

== Other uses ==
- Meadowsweet (novel), a romance novel by Baroness Emmuska Orczy
- HMS Meadowsweet (K144), a Royal Navy warship
- Meadowsweet (restaurant), a restaurant in New York City
