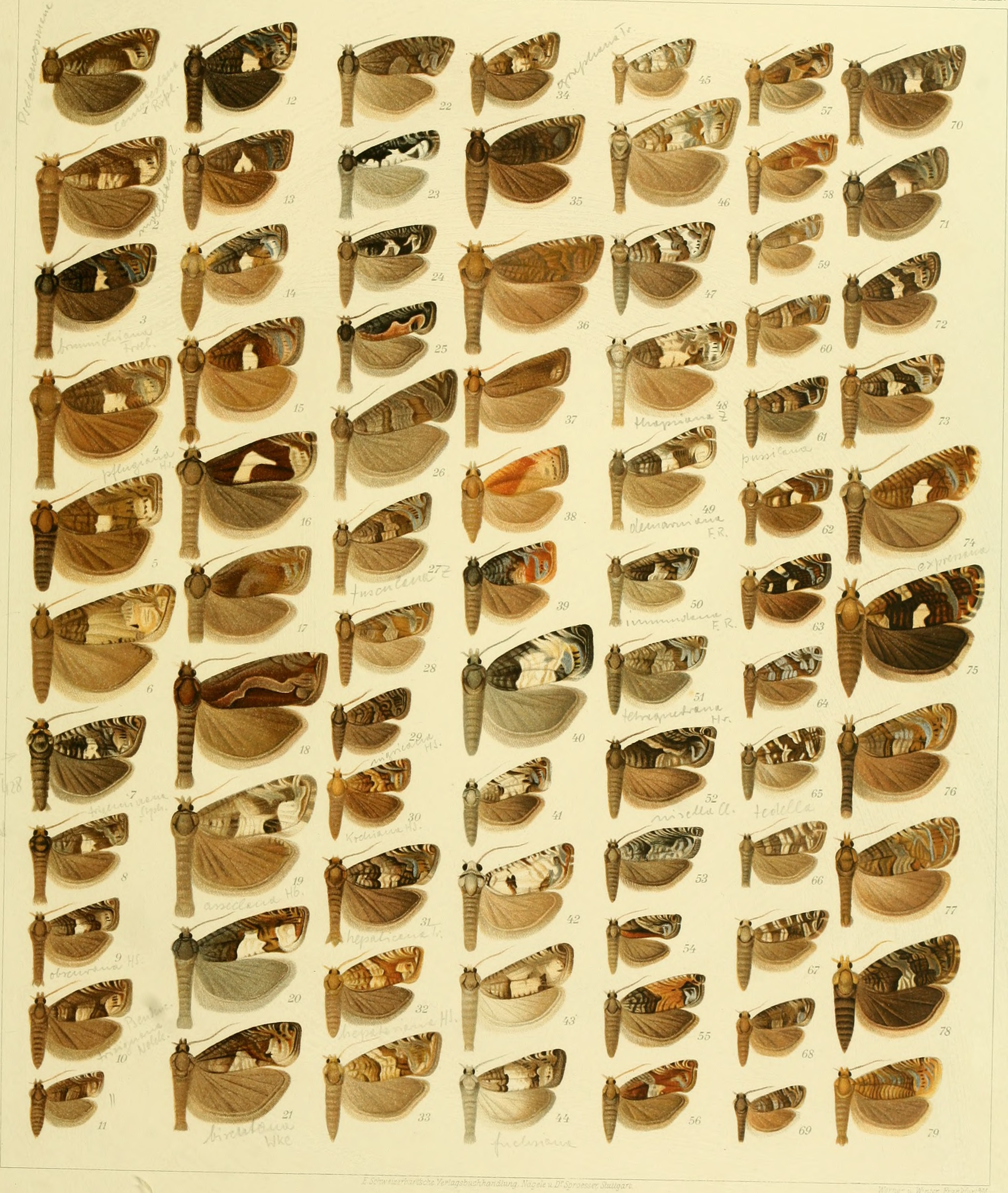
- in Kennel Die palaearktischen tortriciden figure 62

Scientific classification
- Domain: Eukaryota
- Kingdom: Animalia
- Phylum: Arthropoda
- Class: Insecta
- Order: Lepidoptera
- Family: Tortricidae
- Genus: Epinotia
- Species: E. contrariana

Binomial name
- Epinotia contrariana (Christoph, 1882)

Synonyms
- Grapholitha contrariana Christoph, 1882

= Epinotia contrariana =

Species of moth

Epinotia contrariana is a species of moth of the family Tortricidae. It is found in China (Jilin, Heilongjiang, Guizhou, Shaanxi), Mongolia, Korea, Japan and the Russian Far East.

The wingspan is 12–24 mm.

The larvae feed on Astilbe microphylla, Spiraea betulifolia, Spiraea media, Spiraea salicifolia and Spiraea crenata.
