= Parornix mixta =

Scientific classification
- Kingdom: Animalia
- Phylum: Arthropoda
- Clade: Pancrustacea
- Class: Insecta
- Order: Lepidoptera
- Family: Gracillariidae
- Genus: Parornix
- Species: P. mixta

Binomial name
- Parornix mixta (Triberti, 1980)

Synonyms
- Callisto mixta Triberti, 1980

Species of moth

Parornix mixta is a moth of the family Gracillariidae. It is known from Italy, Romania, Slovakia, the former Yugoslavia and Transbaikalia in Russia.

The larvae feed on Spiraea media and Spiraea × vanhouttei. They probably mine the leaves of their host plant.
