= Staphidine =

Alkaloid found in Delphinium species

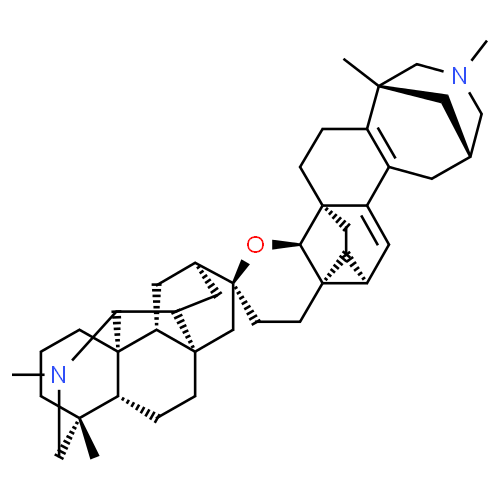

Names
- IUPAC name 5,5',7,7'-tetramethylspiro[20-oxa-7-azaheptacyclo[13.6.1.1^{5,9}.0^{1,12}.0^{4,11}.0^{14,16}.0^{16,21}]tricosa-4(11),12-diene-19,12'-7-azahexacyclo[9.6.2.0^{1,8}.0^{5,17}.0^{9,14}.0^{14,18}]nonadecane]

Identifiers
CAS Number	59588-15-7
3D model (JSmol)	Interactive image
ChEBI	CHEBI:9250
ChemSpider	10246451
KEGG	C08712
PubChem CID	431675
- InChI: InChI=1S/C42H58N2O/c1-36-8-5-9-42-32(36)7-11-39-21-40(25(16-33(39)42)15-30(39)34(42)44(4)23-36)12-13-41-29-17-28-26-14-24-18-37(2,22-43(3)20-24)27(26)6-10-38(28,19-31(29)41)35(41)45-40/h17,24-25,29-35H,5-16,18-23H2,1-4H3 Key: MIQIFBIWUBAPTB-UHFFFAOYSA-N
- SMILES: CC12CCCC34C1CCC56C3CC(CC5C4N(C2)C)C7(C6)CCC89C1C8C=C2C3=C(CCC2(C1)C9O7)C1(CC(C3)CN(C1)C)C

Properties
Chemical formula	C_{42}H_{58}N_{2}O
Molar mass	606.939 g·mol^{−1}
- Except where otherwise noted, data are given for materials in their standard state (at 25 °C [77 °F], 100 kPa). Infobox references

Staphidine is a bis-diterpene alkaloid of the atisane type, found in the tissues of Delphinium staphisagria in the larkspur family (Ranunculaceae) along with staphimine and staphinine. Similar alkaloids are found in the genus Aconitum in that family, as well as Spiraea in the Rosaceae family.
