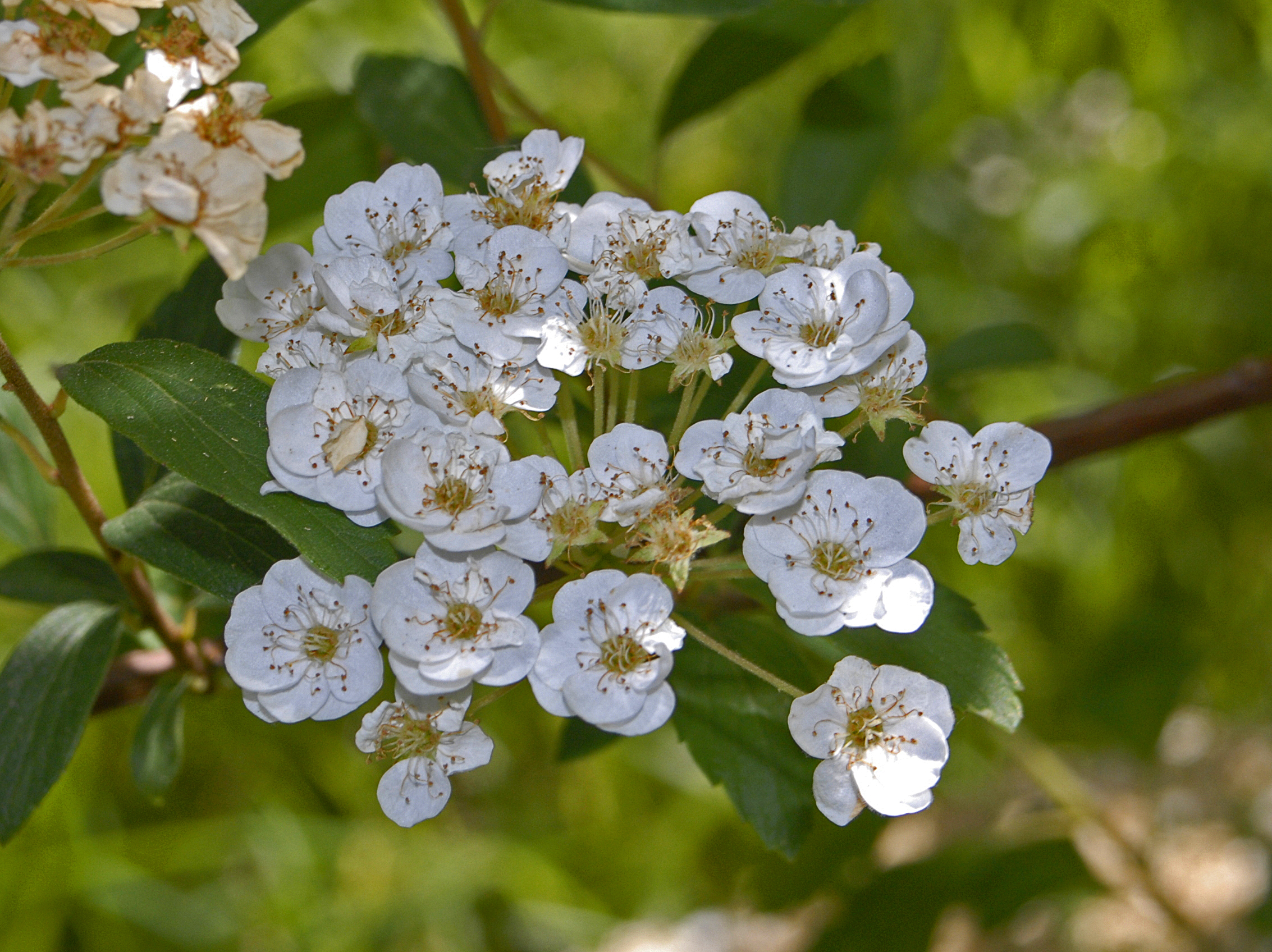
- Flowers of Spyraea chamaedryfolia at the Orto Botanico dell'Università di Genova

Scientific classification
- Kingdom: Plantae
- Clade: Tracheophytes
- Clade: Angiosperms
- Clade: Eudicots
- Clade: Rosids
- Order: Rosales
- Family: Rosaceae
- Genus: Spiraea
- Species: S. chamaedryfolia

Binomial name
- Spiraea chamaedryfolia L.

Synonyms
- Spiraea chamaedryfolia var. ulmifolia Maxim.; Spiraea ussuriensis Pojark.

= Spiraea chamaedryfolia =

Species of flowering plant

Spiraea chamaedryfolia, common name germander meadowsweet or elm-leaved spirea, is a species of plant belonging to the family Rosaceae.

== Description ==
Spiraea chamaedryfolia is a shrub reaching a height of 1–1.5 metres (3 ft 3 in – 4 ft 11 in). Branchlets are brownish or red-brown. Leaves are simple, oblong or lance-shaped, toothed on the edges, 40–60 millimetres (1.6–2.4 in) long and 10–30 millimetres (0.39–1.18 in) wide, with a petiole of 4–7 mm. The white flowers of 6–9 mm in diameter grow in spikelike clusters at the ends of the branches. Flowering period extends from May to September.

== Distribution ==
This species is native to the mixed forests and forest clearings of South Eastern Europe and Asia (China, Japan, Korea, Mongolia, Russia and Europe). It can be found at an elevation of 600–1,000 metres (2,000–3,300 ft) above sea level.
