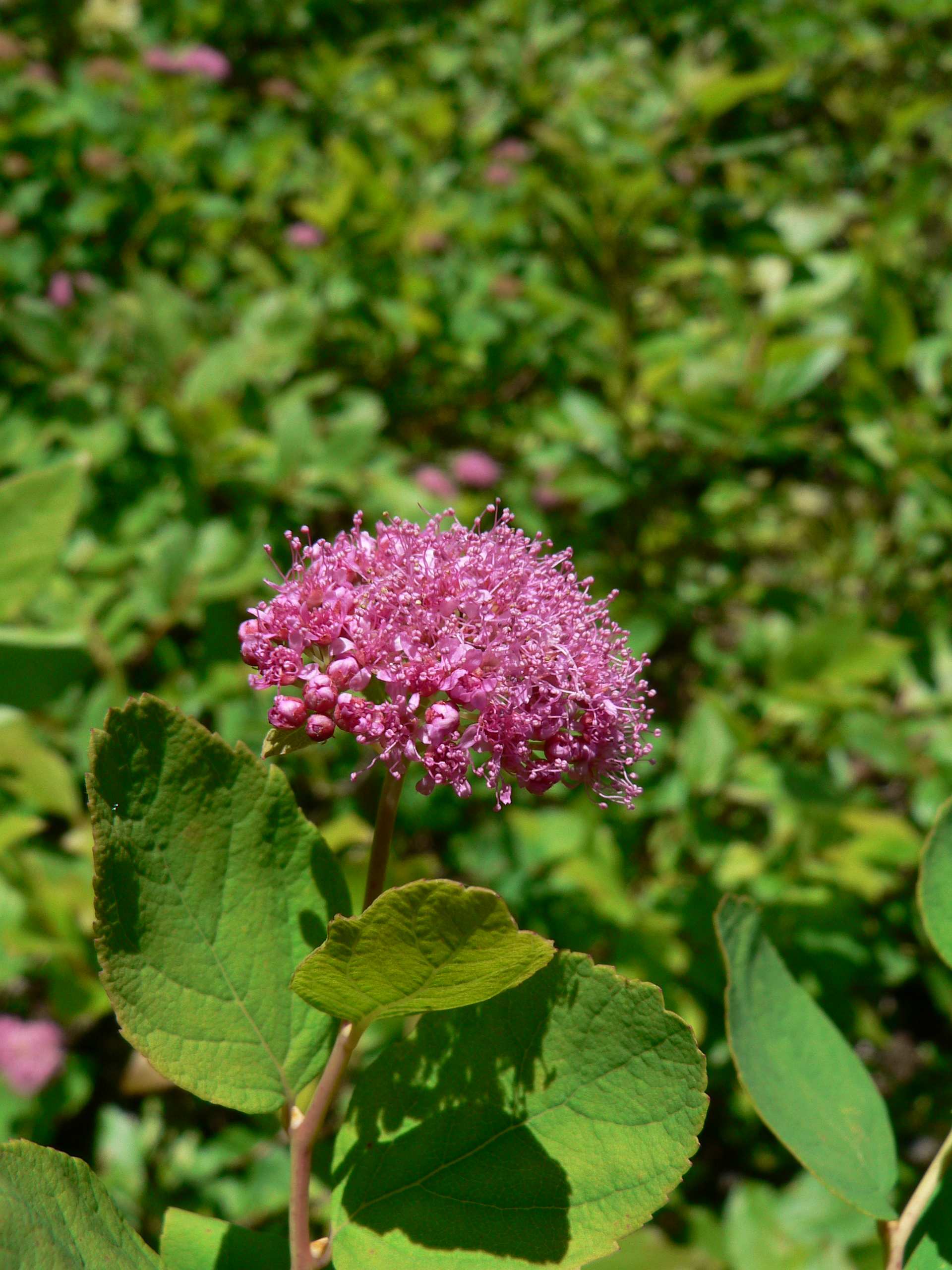

Scientific classification
- Kingdom: Plantae
- Clade: Tracheophytes
- Clade: Angiosperms
- Clade: Eudicots
- Clade: Rosids
- Order: Rosales
- Family: Rosaceae
- Genus: Spiraea
- Species: S. splendens

Binomial name
- Spiraea splendens Baumann ex K.Koch

Synonyms
- Spiraea arbuscula Greene; Spiraea betulifolia var. rosea A. Gray; Spiraea densiflora Nutt. ex Greenm. nom illeg.

= Spiraea splendens =

Species of shrub

Spiraea splendens is a shrub of the rose family (Rosaceae) native to the western mountains of North America, from California to British Columbia, commonly known as dense-flowered spiraea, rose meadowsweet, rosy spiraea, subalpine spiraea, and mountain spiraea. It is commonly found at elevations between 2,000 feet (610 m) and 11,000 feet (3,400 m) on inland mountain ranges. The plant is adapted to cold, moist, rocky slopes, subalpine forests and meadows.

It is a woody shrub rarely reaching a meter in height. It has light green toothed leaves which turn yellow as cold weather approaches. The plant bears fragrant, fuzzy pom-poms of bright rosy pink flowers in the summer. The fruit is a tiny dry pod, no more than one eighth of an inch in length.

Native Americans made a tea-like drink from the leaves.

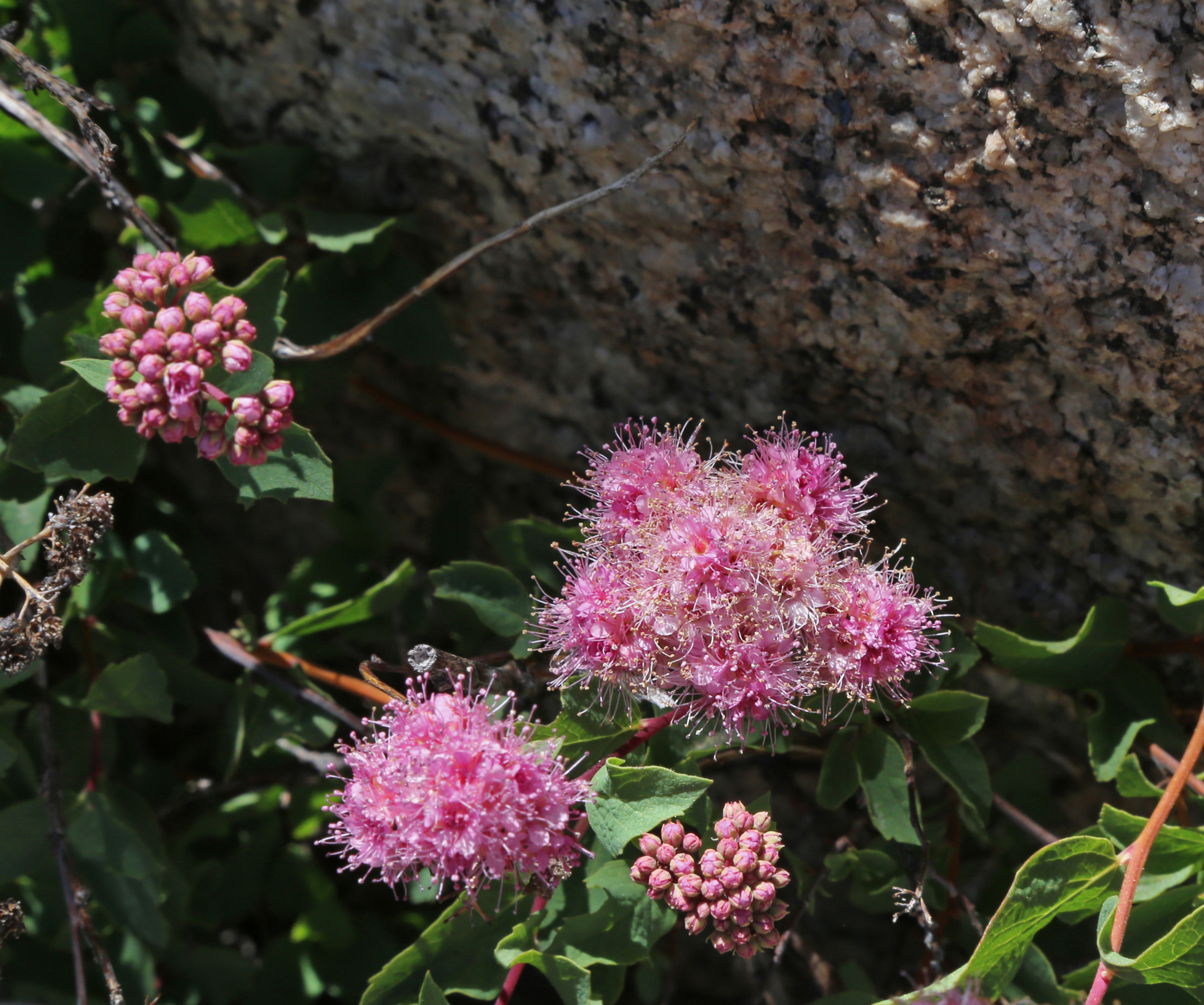
Mountain spiraea flowers & buds close

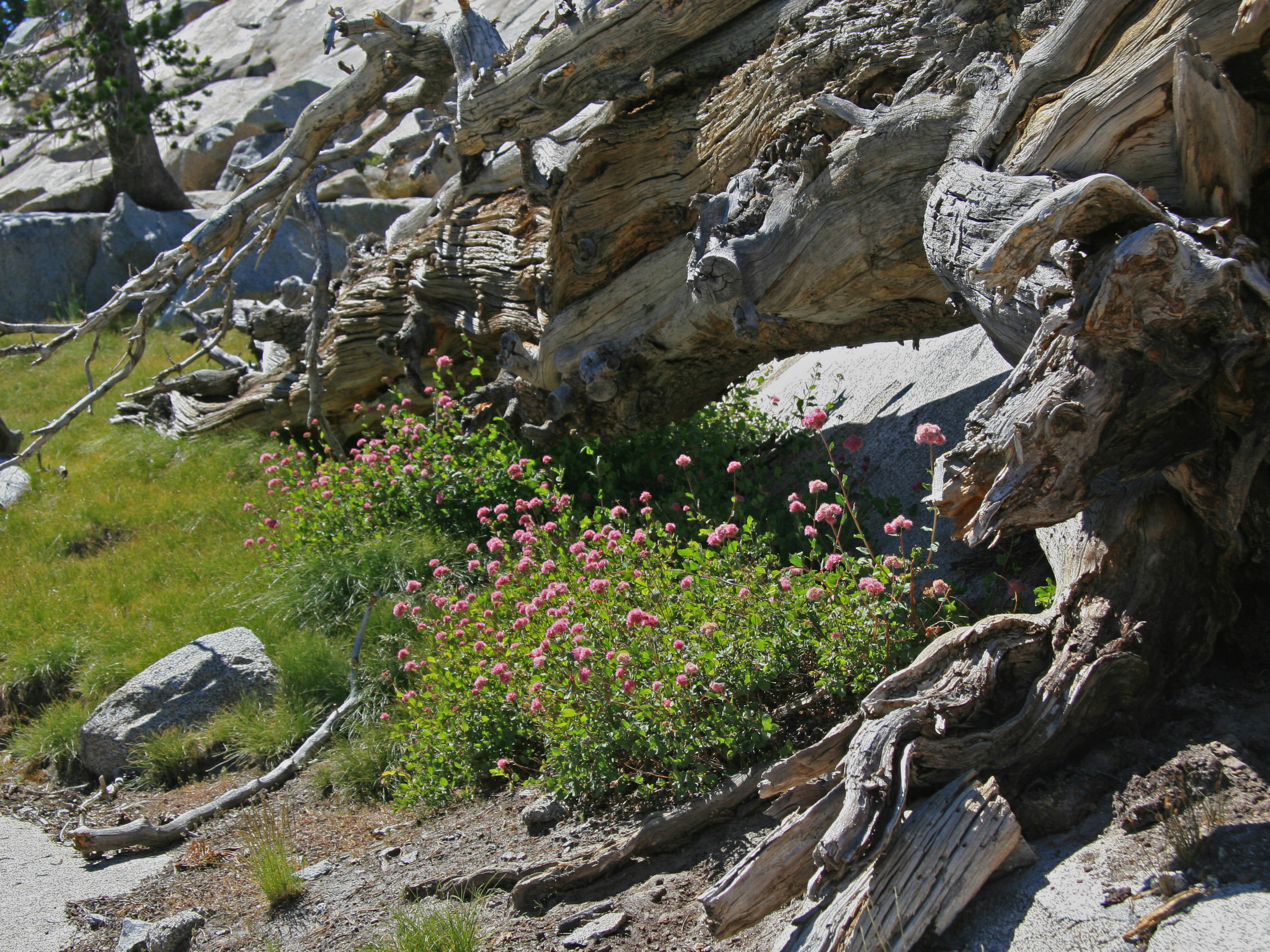
Spiraea splendens plants in Ansel Adams Wilderness
