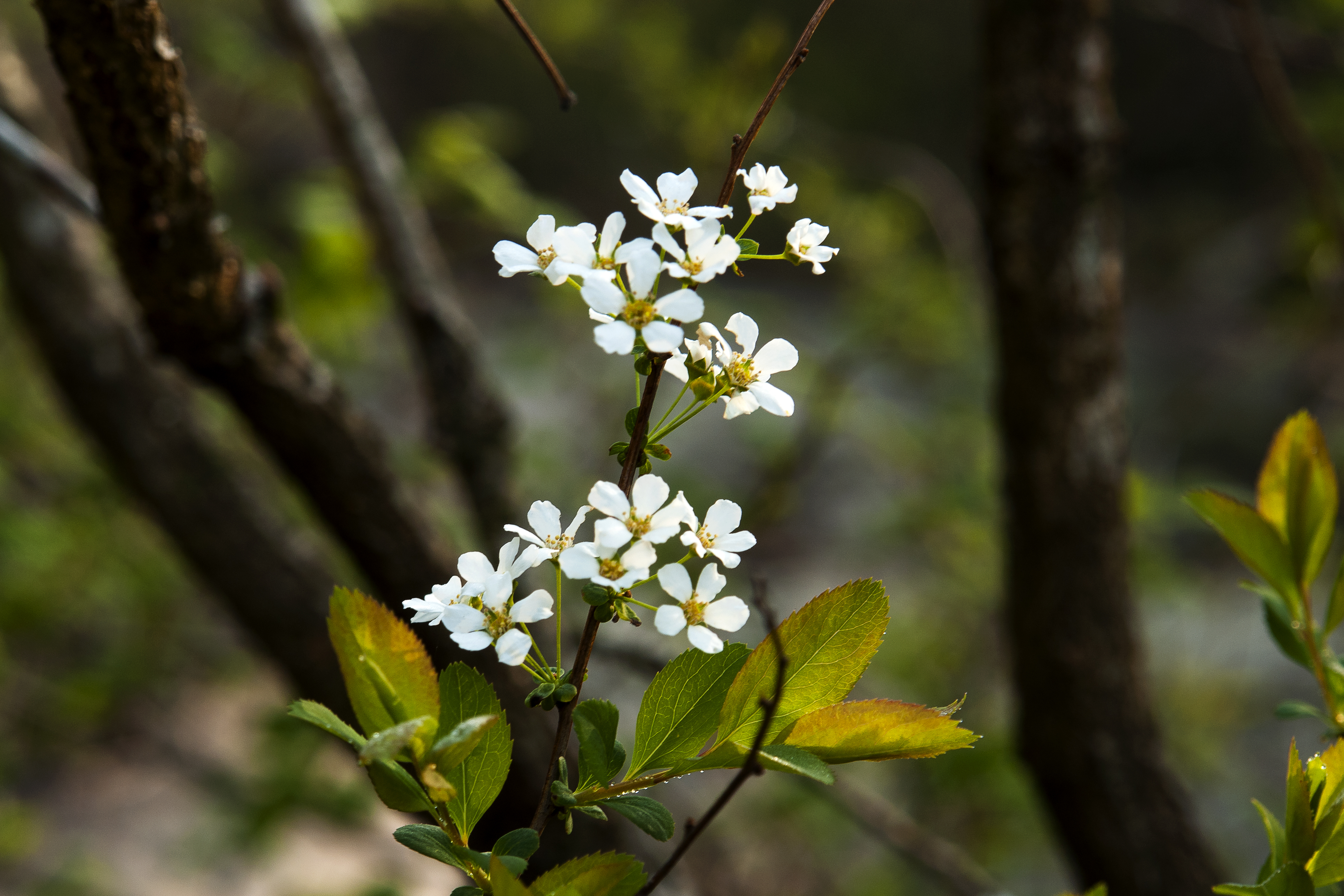
- Spiraea prunifolia var. simpliciflora

Scientific classification
- Kingdom: Plantae
- Clade: Tracheophytes
- Clade: Angiosperms
- Clade: Eudicots
- Clade: Rosids
- Order: Rosales
- Family: Rosaceae
- Genus: Spiraea
- Species: S. prunifolia

Binomial name
- Spiraea prunifolia Siebold & Zucc.

= Spiraea prunifolia =

Species of flowering plant

Spiraea prunifolia, commonly called bridalwreath spirea, is a species of the genus Spiraea, sometimes also spelled Spirea. It flowers mid-spring, around May 5, and is native to Japan, Korea, China, and Taiwan. It is sometimes cultivated as a garden plant elsewhere.
