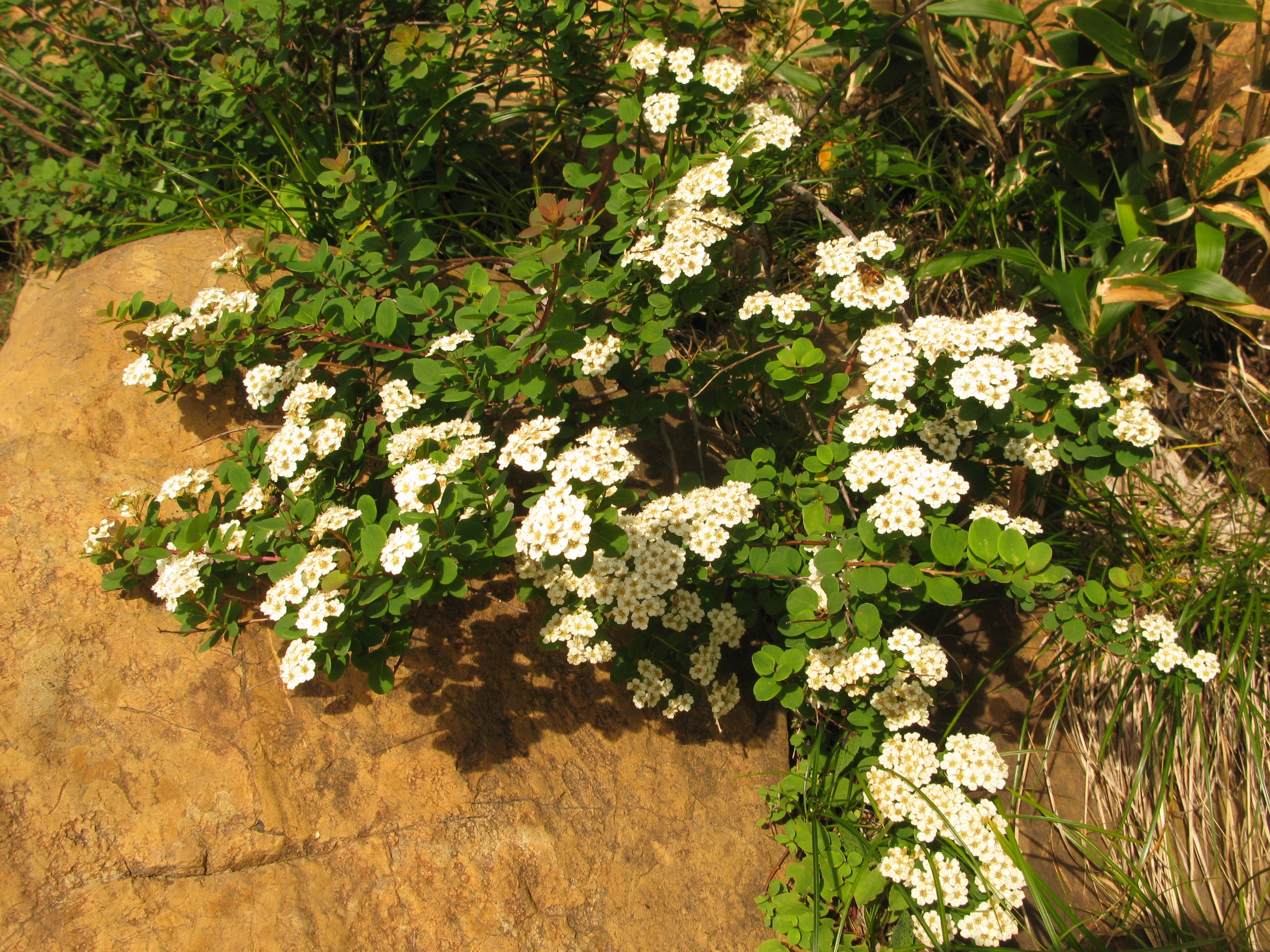

Scientific classification
- Kingdom: Plantae
- Clade: Tracheophytes
- Clade: Angiosperms
- Clade: Eudicots
- Clade: Rosids
- Order: Rosales
- Family: Rosaceae
- Genus: Spiraea
- Species: S. nipponica

Binomial name
- Spiraea nipponica Maxim.

= Spiraea nipponica =

Species of flowering plant

Spiraea nipponica is a species of flowering plant in the family Rosaceae, native to the island of Shikoku, Japan. Growing to 1.2–2.5 m (4–8 ft) tall and broad, it is a deciduous shrub with clusters of small, bowl-shaped white flowers in midsummer.

The specific epithet nipponica means "Japanese".

== Cultivars ==
The cultivar 'Snowmound' has gained the Royal Horticultural Society's Award of Garden Merit.

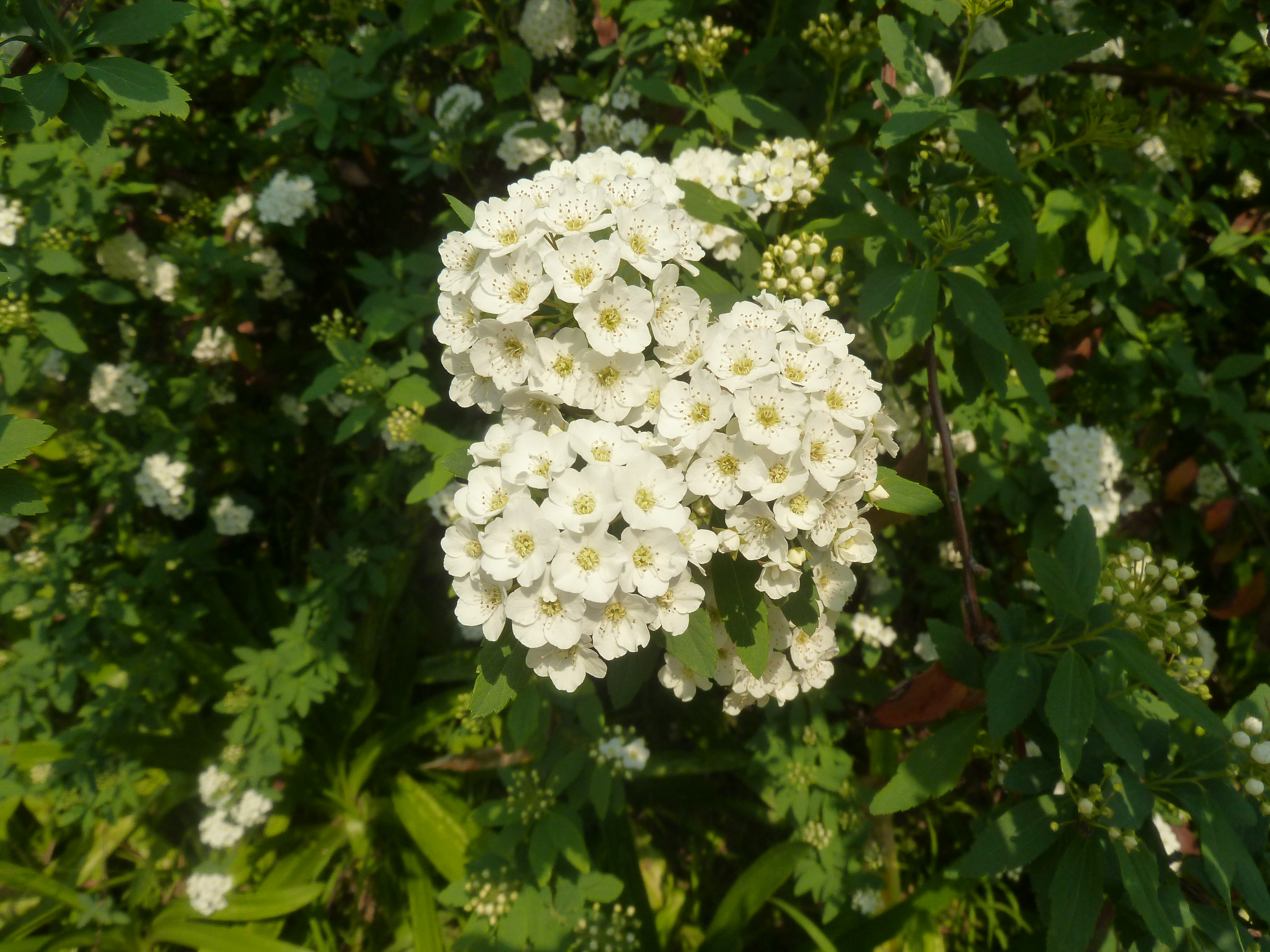
Spiraea nipponica 'Snowmound'

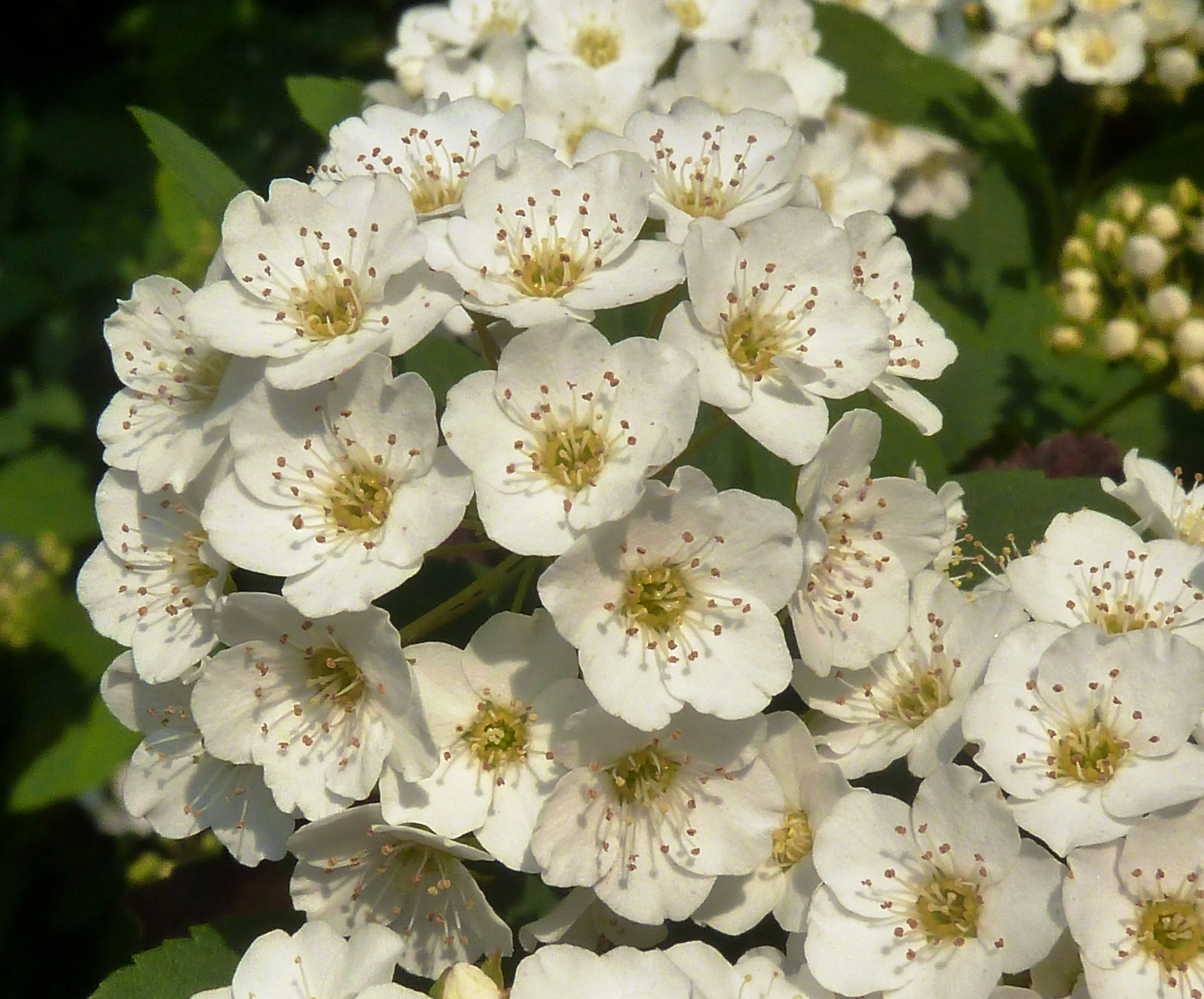
Spiraea nipponica 'Snowmound'

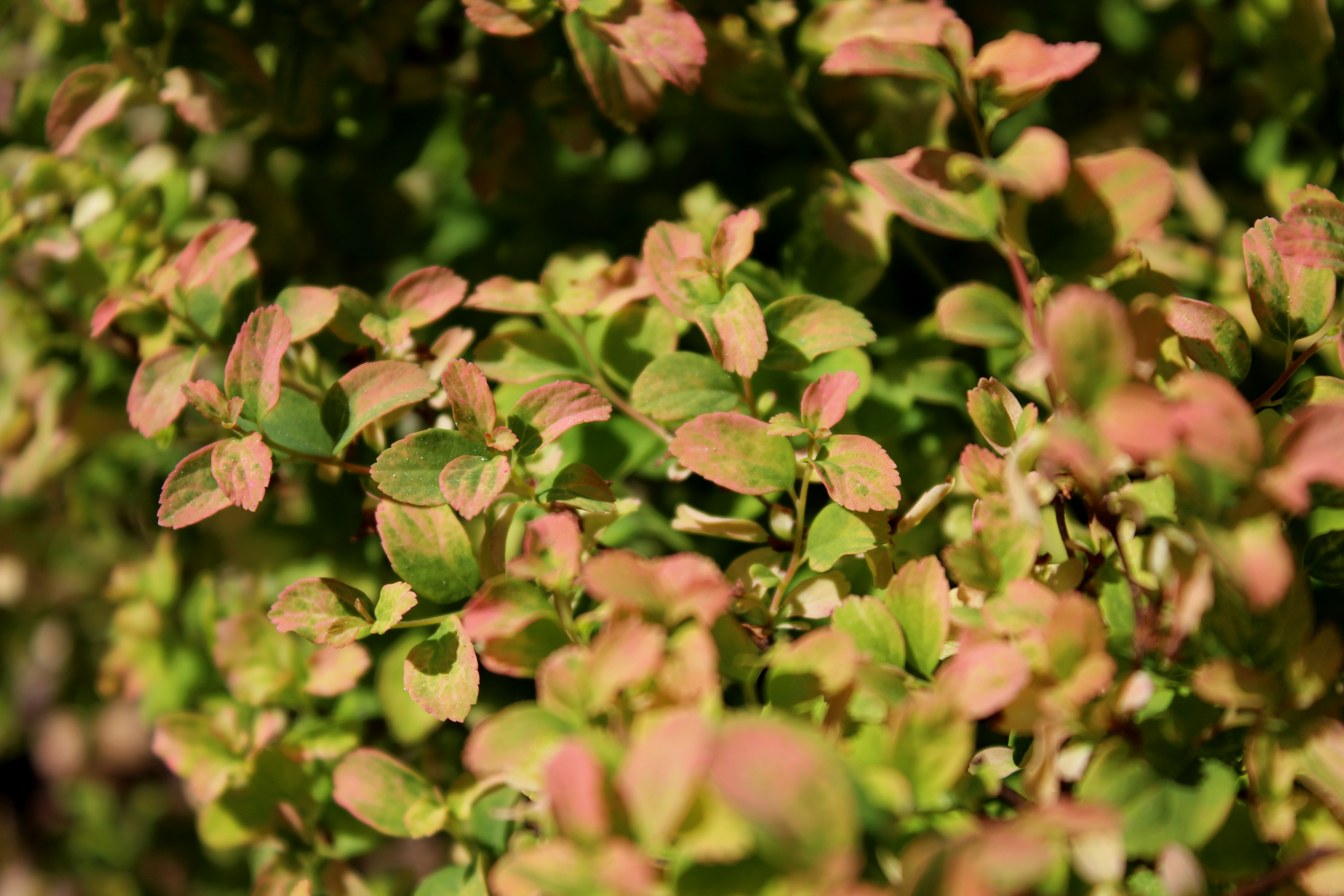
Spiraea nipponica 'Gerlve's Rainbow'

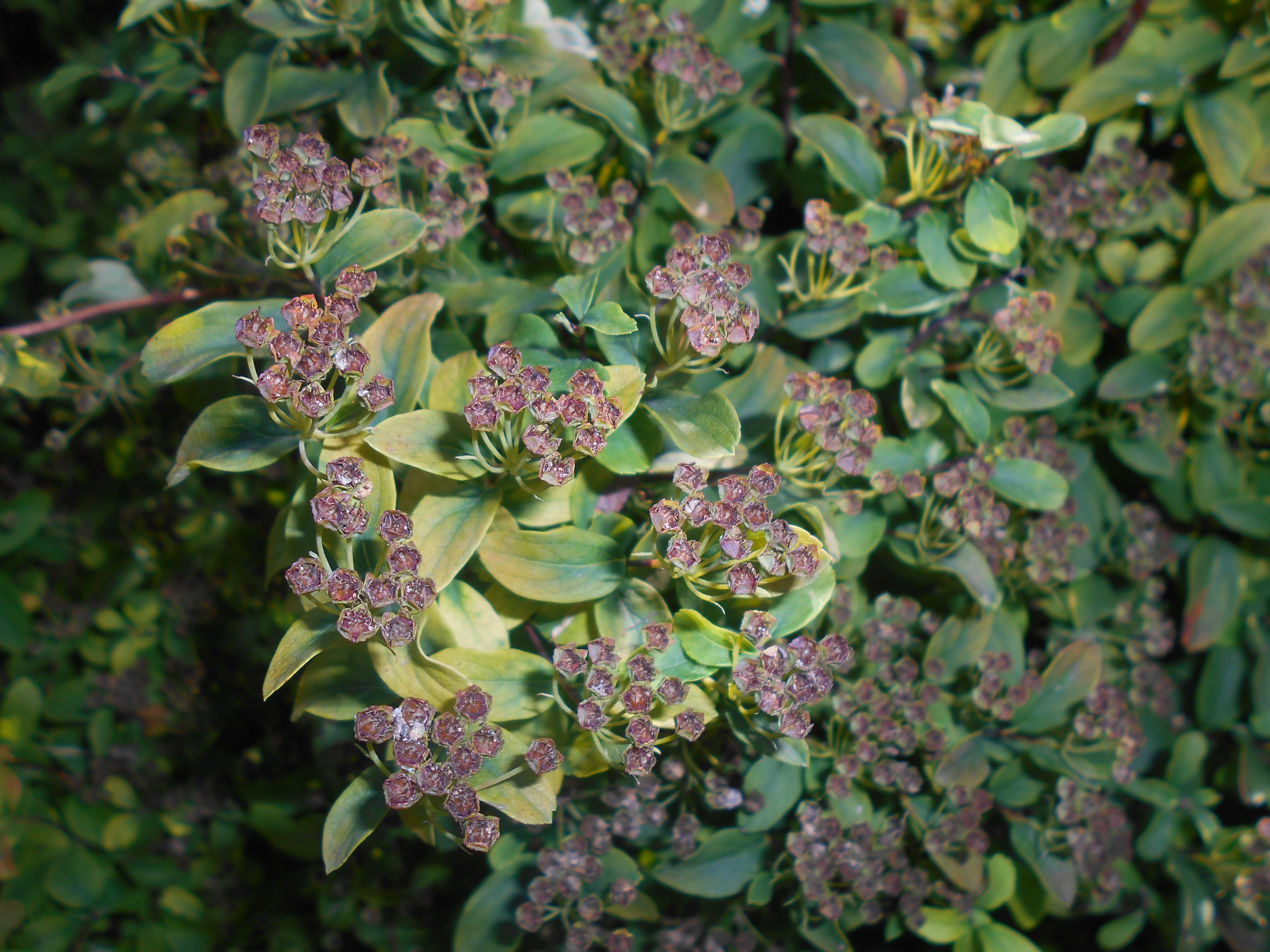
Spiraea nipponica 'Halward's Silver'
