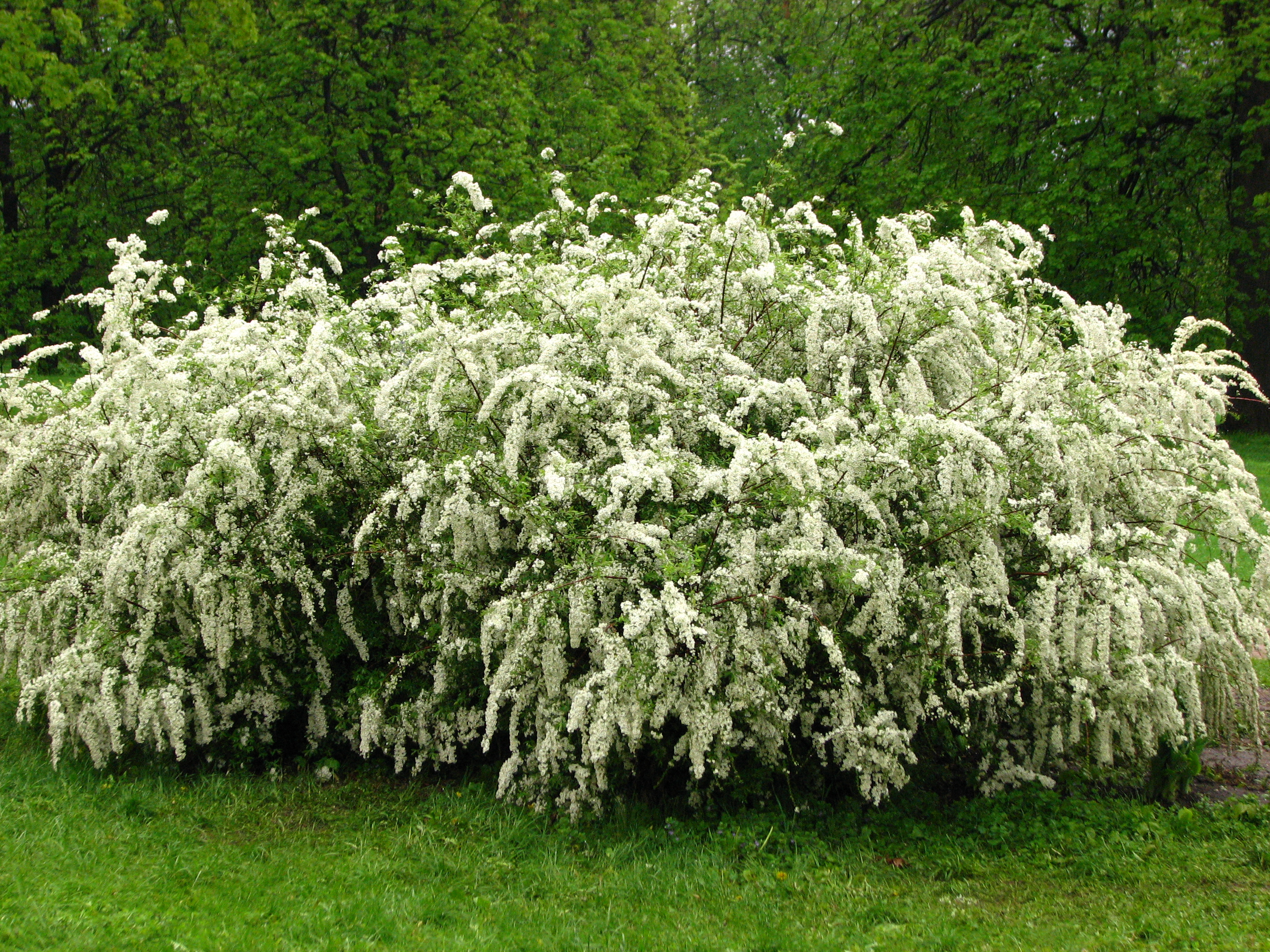

Scientific classification
- Kingdom: Plantae
- Clade: Tracheophytes
- Clade: Angiosperms
- Clade: Eudicots
- Clade: Rosids
- Order: Rosales
- Family: Rosaceae
- Genus: Spiraea
- Species: S. × cinerea

Binomial name
- Spiraea × cinerea Zabel

= Spiraea × cinerea =

Species of flowering plant

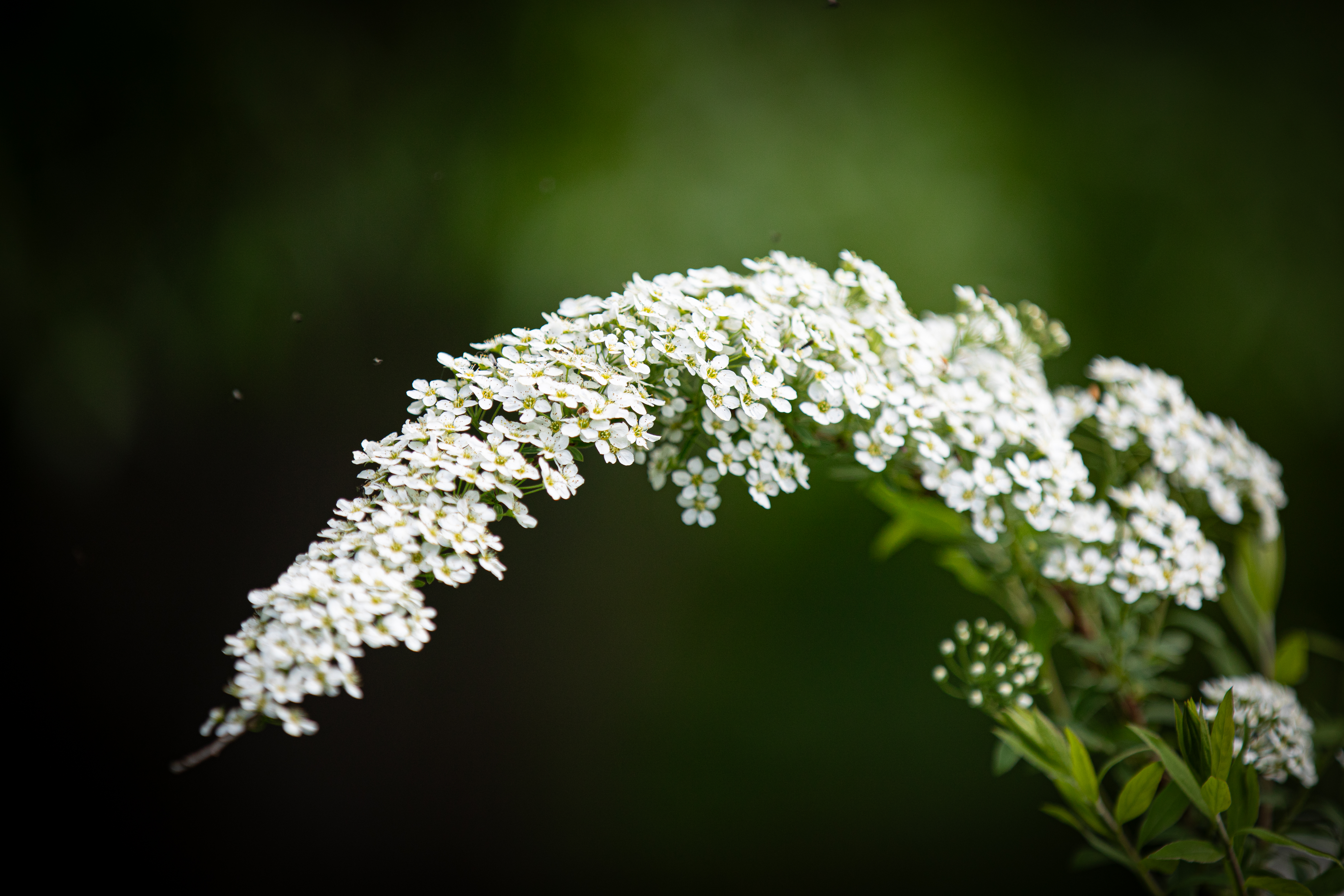
Spiraea × cinerea 'Grefsheim' inflorescence

Spiraea × cinerea is a species of flowering plant in the family Rosaceae. It is a hybrid of garden origin (Spiraea hypericifolia × S. cana). Growing to 1.5 m (5 ft) tall and wide, this compact deciduous shrub bears small, lanceolate leaves and multiple white blooms along its arching stems in spring.

The Latin specific epithet cinerea means "the colour of ash".

The cultivar 'Grefsheim' is widely grown as a garden plant. Hardy down to USDA Zone 2a, it is easy to grow in a sunny mixed planting. It has gained the Royal Horticultural Society's Award of Garden Merit.

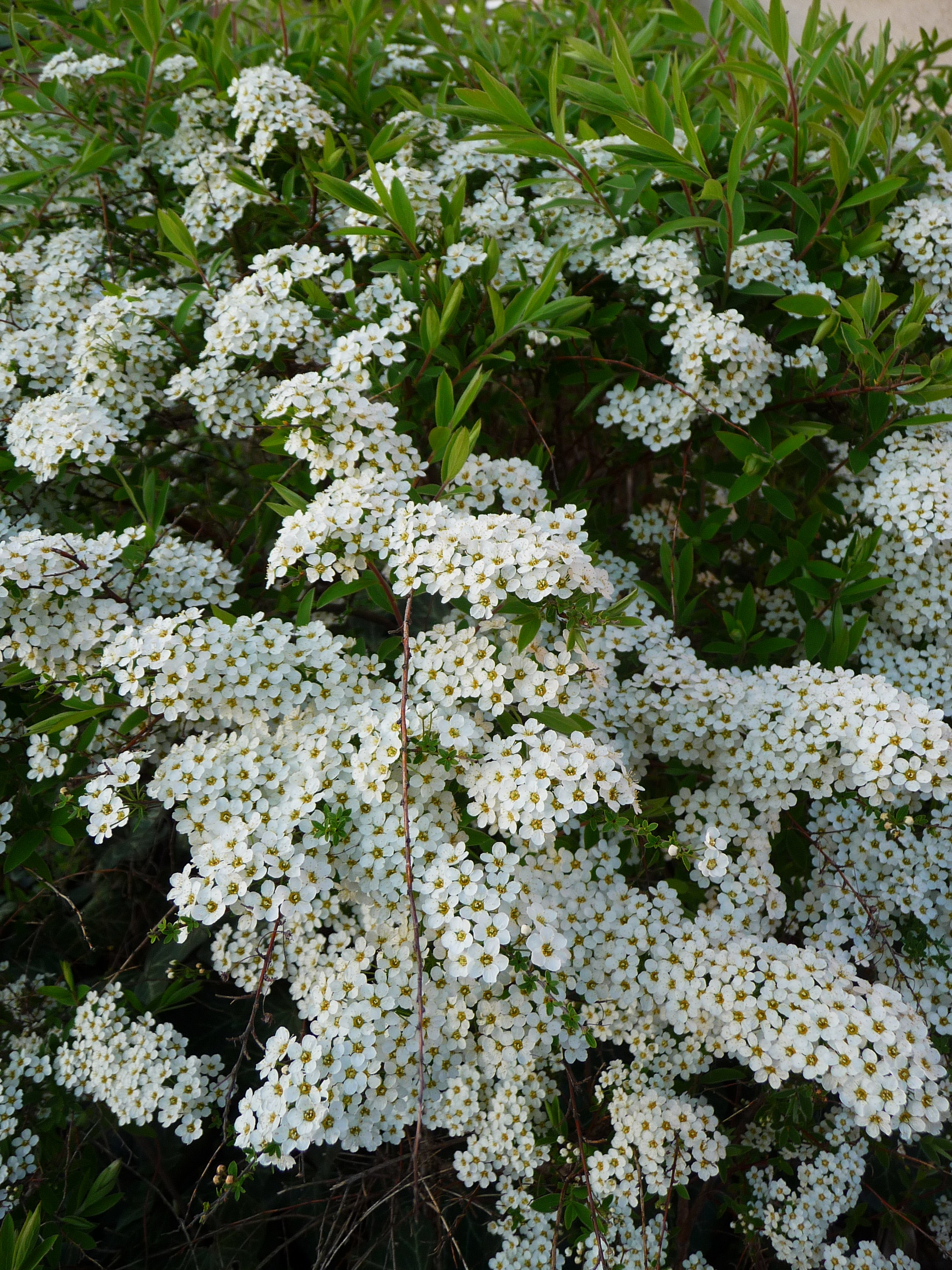

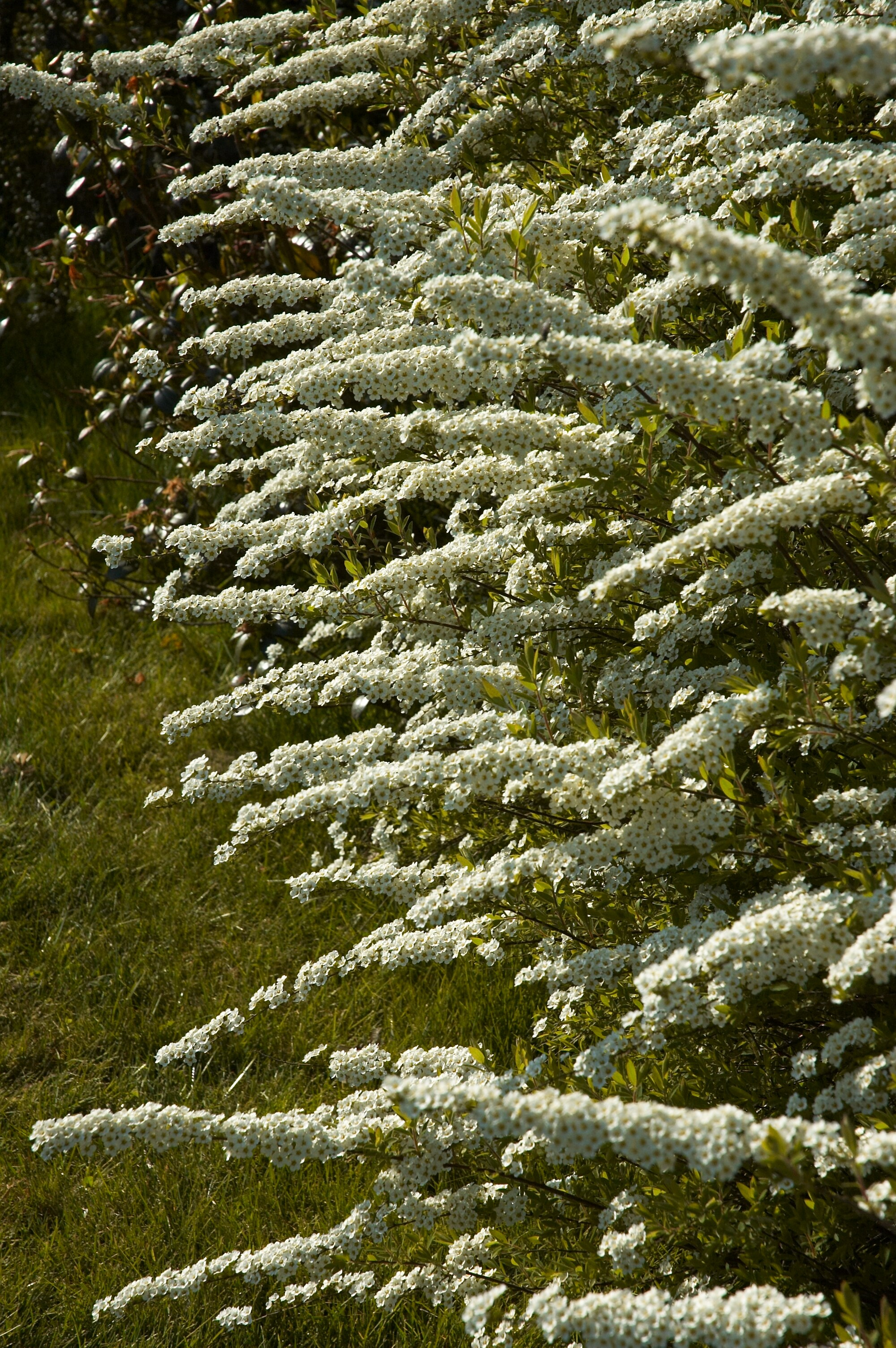
'Grefsheim'
