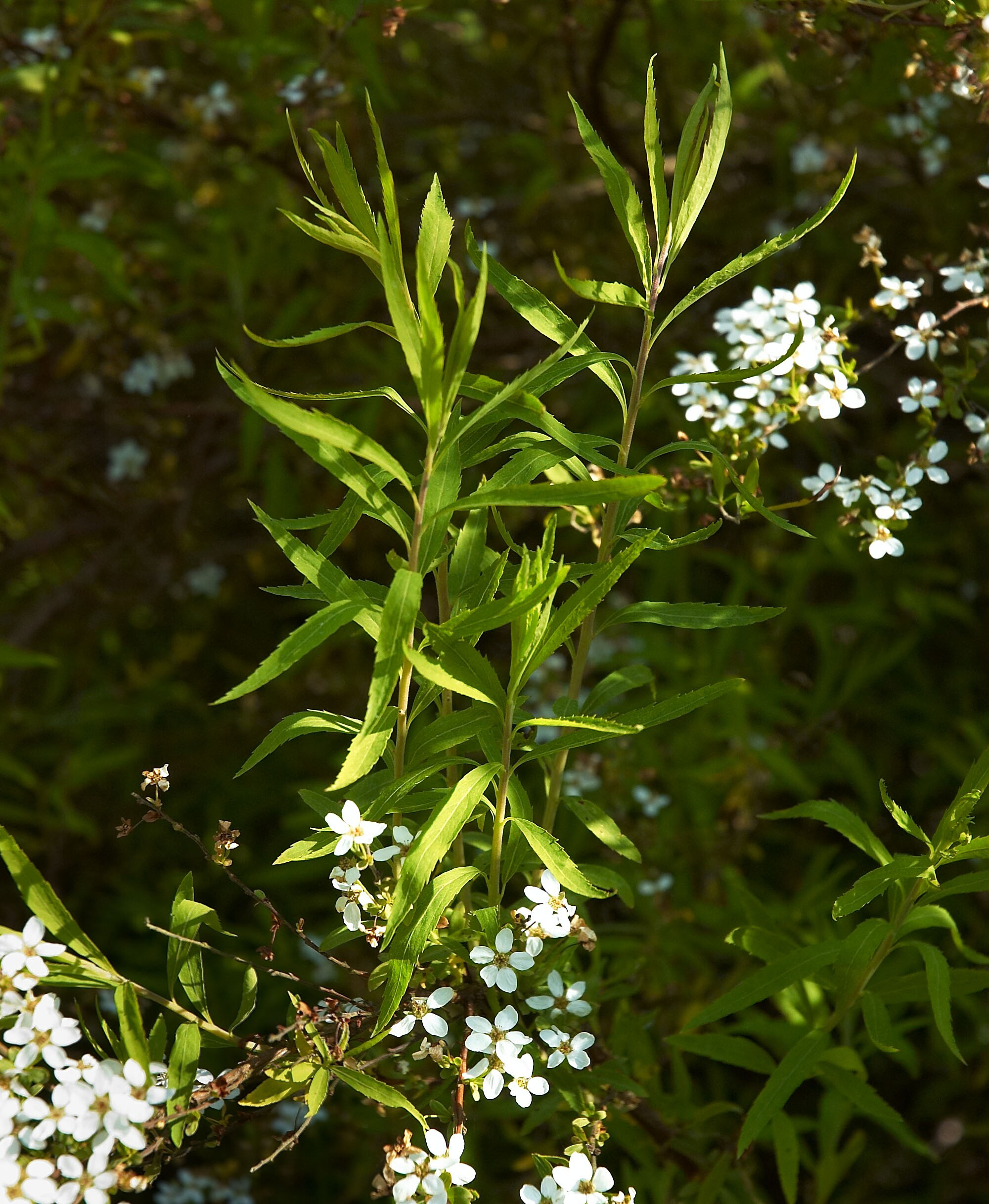
- Flowers and foliage

Scientific classification
- Kingdom: Plantae
- Clade: Tracheophytes
- Clade: Angiosperms
- Clade: Eudicots
- Clade: Rosids
- Order: Rosales
- Family: Rosaceae
- Genus: Spiraea
- Species: S. thunbergii

Binomial name
- Spiraea thunbergii Sieb. ex Blume

= Spiraea thunbergii =

Species of plant

Spiraea thunbergii, commonly known as Thunberg spiraea or Thunberg's meadowsweet, is a species of flowering plant in the rose family, native to East China and Japan, and widely cultivated elsewhere.

== Names ==
Other common names include baby's breath spirea. The Japanese common name is yuki-yanagi.

This is one of several plants whose Latin specific epithet thunbergii honours the Swedish botanist and plant collector Carl Peter Thunberg (1743–1828).

== Description ==
Growing to 1.5 m (4.9 ft) tall and broad, Spiraea thunbergii is a small, long-lived shrub with thin, flexible stems. The flowers are white, borne in abundance in spring and early summer. The alternate, simple, almost linear leaves are semi-deciduous.

== Chemistry ==
This plant produces phytotoxic cis-cinnamoyl glucosides and cis-cinnamic acid. The plant-growth inhibition characteristics can be used against diverse species as lettuce (Lactuca sativa), pigweed (Amaranthus retroflexus), red clover (Trifolium pratense), timothy (Phleum pratense), and bok choy (Brassica rapa var chinensis). The characteristics of these natural chemicals indicate a potential role of cis-cinnamic acid and its glucosides as allelochemicals (chemicals, released from plants, that cause an interaction between plants and other living organisms) for use as plant growth regulators and weed suppression in agricultural fields and natural ecosystems.

== Cultivation ==
Spiraea thunbergii is grown as an ornamental plant in temperate regions. It is hardy and easy to grow in a sunny mixed border. In the UK it has gained the Royal Horticultural Society's Award of Garden Merit.

== Hybrid ==
This species forms an interspecific hybrid with Spiraea japonica L. fil.

In the horticultural trade one can obtain several varieties of Spiraea thunbergii, such as 'Mt Fuji' (white flowers), 'Ogon' (bright yellow-green leaves and white flowers), 'Mellow yellow' and 'Fugino pink'.

== Gallery ==
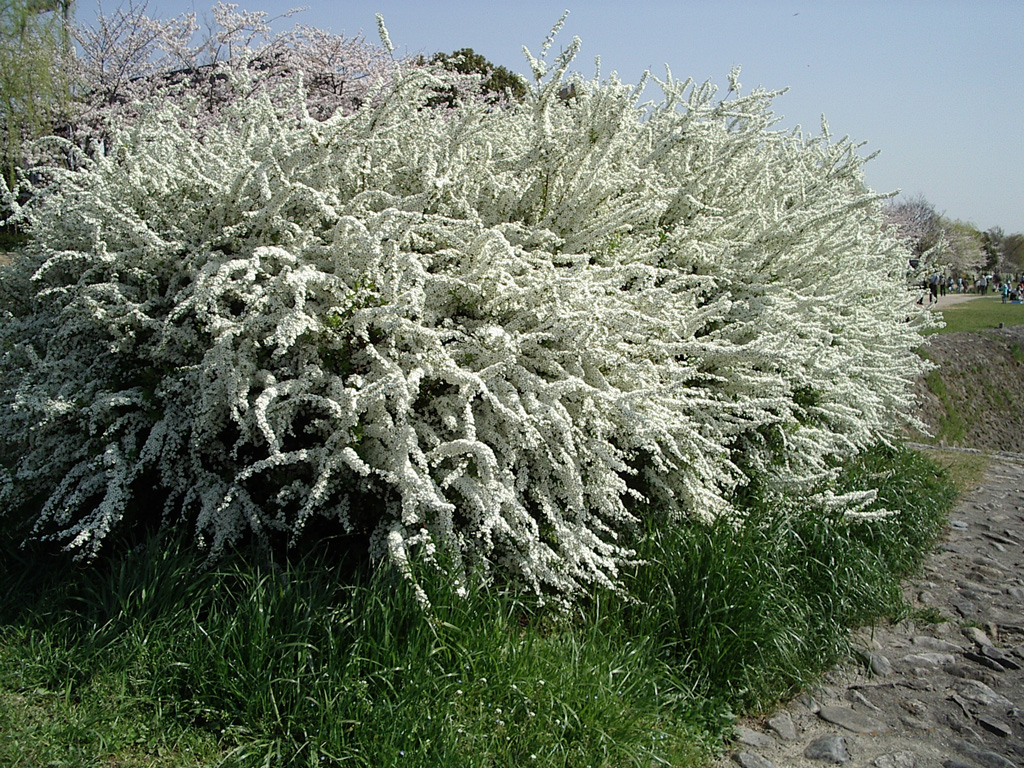

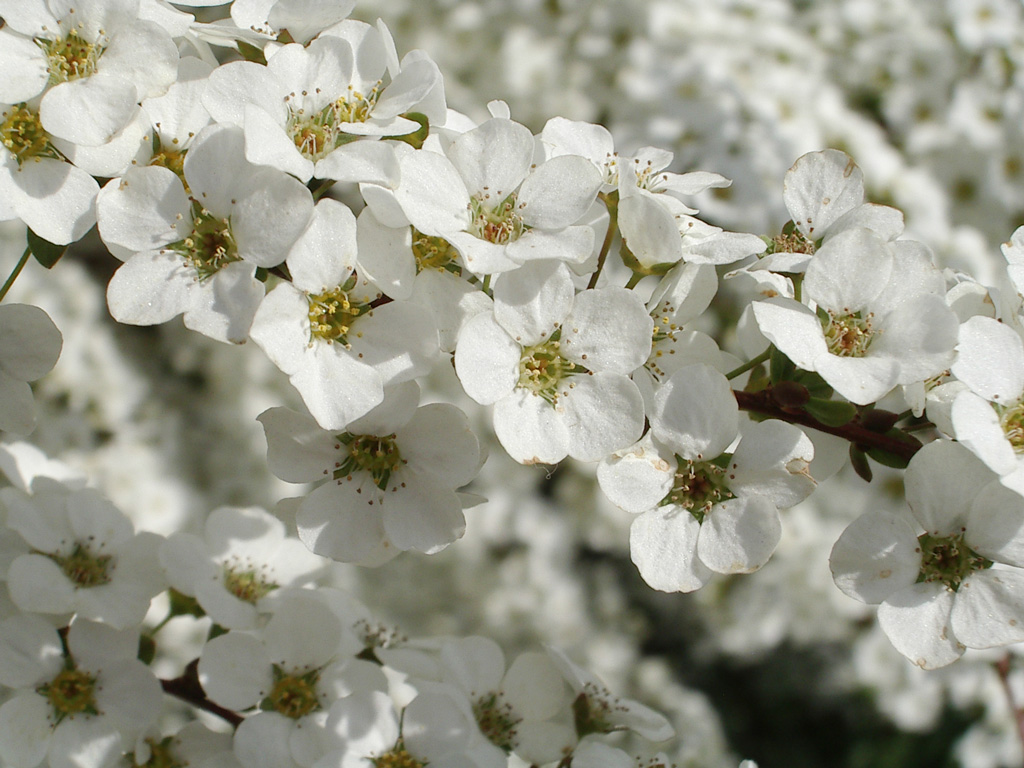

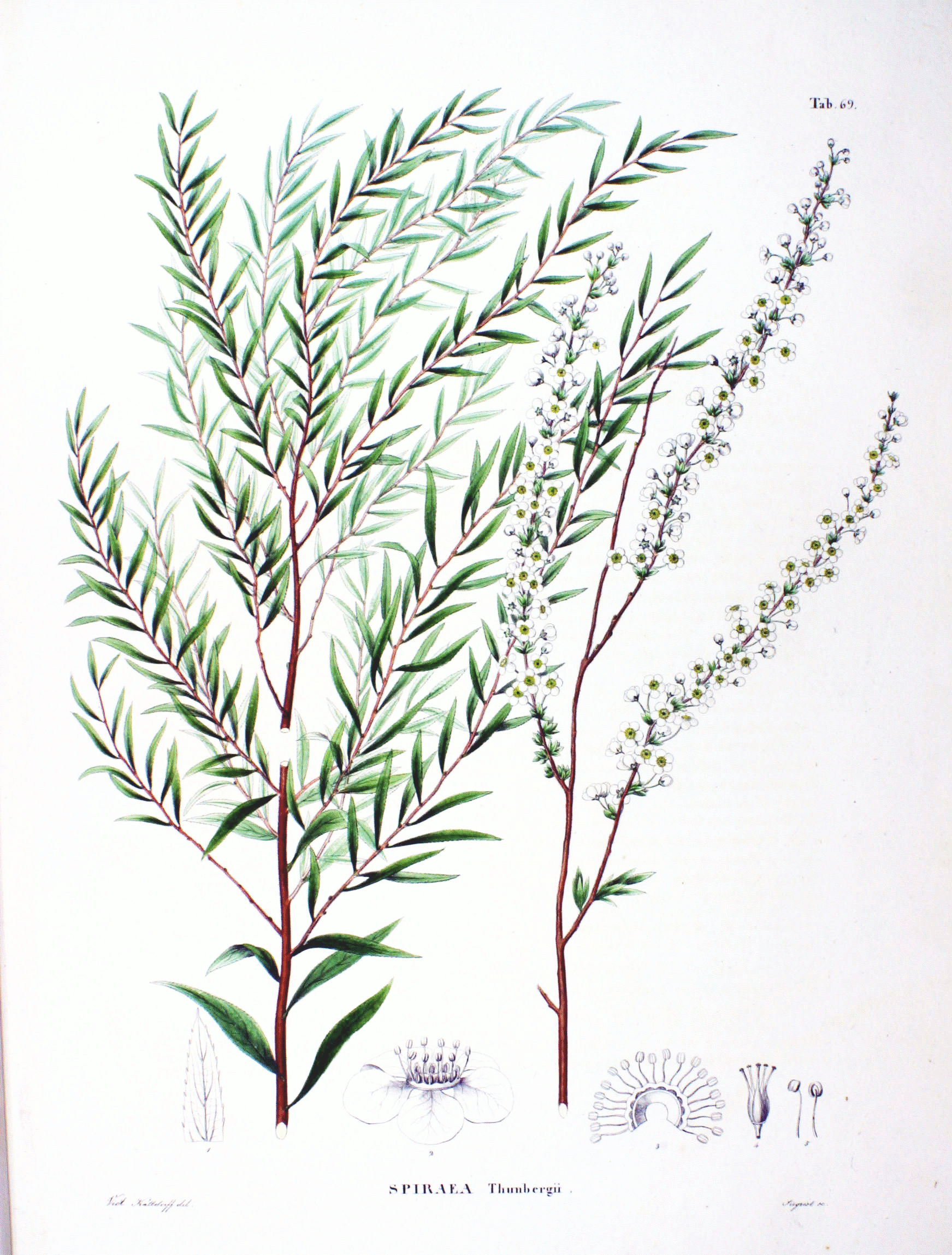
