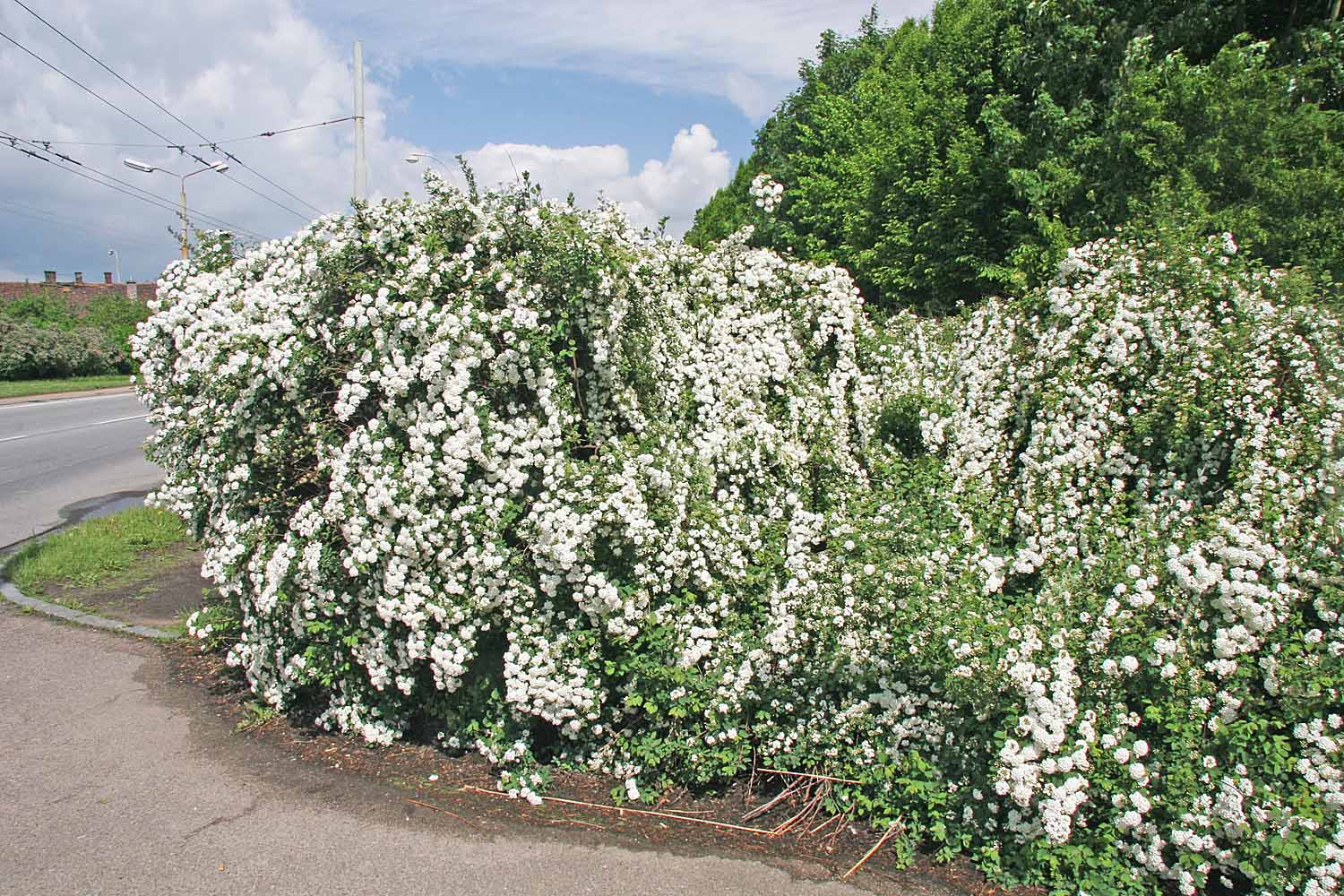
- Typically vigorous growth
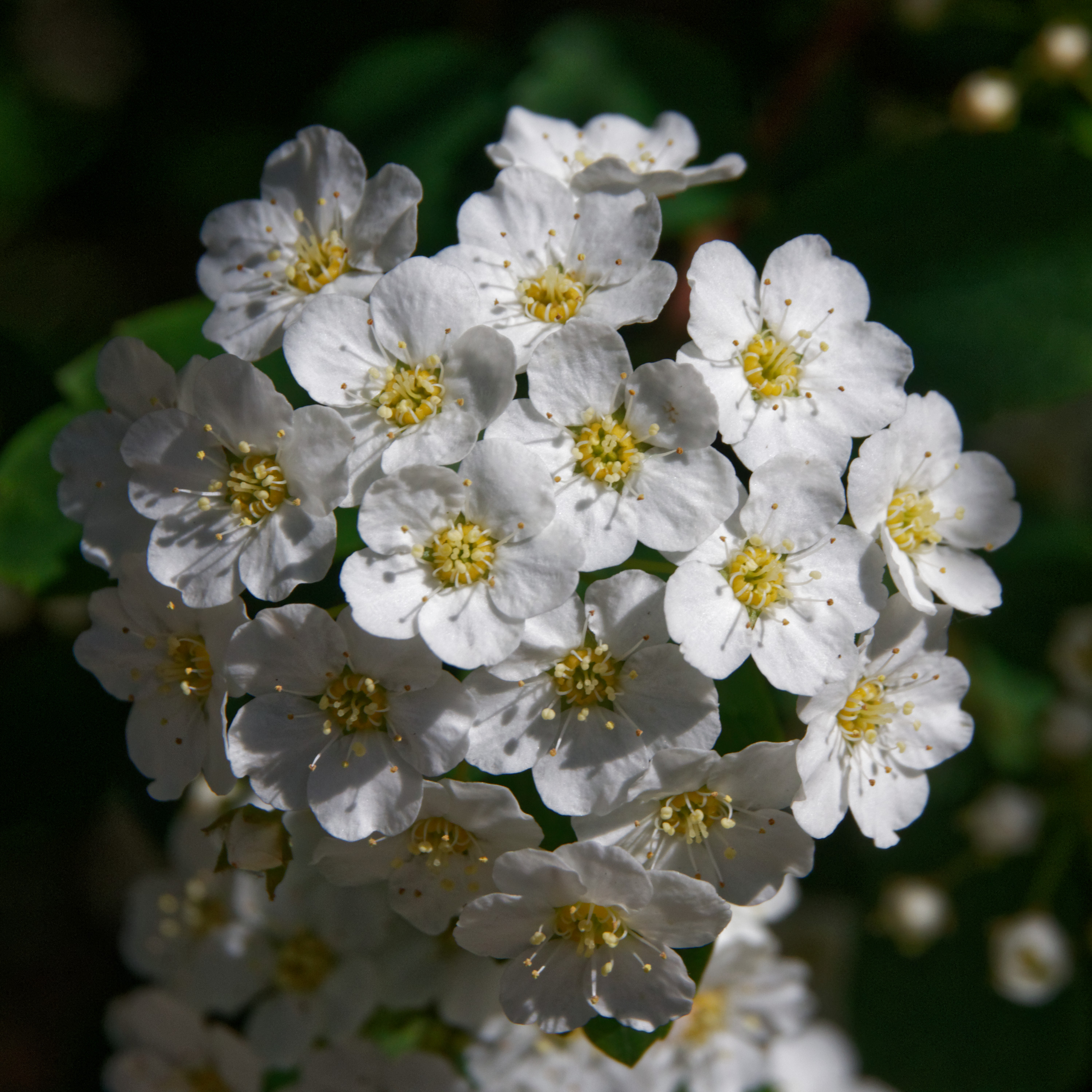
- Close-up of inflorescence

Scientific classification
- Kingdom: Plantae
- Clade: Tracheophytes
- Clade: Angiosperms
- Clade: Eudicots
- Clade: Rosids
- Order: Rosales
- Family: Rosaceae
- Genus: Spiraea
- Species: S. × vanhouttei

Binomial name
- Spiraea × vanhouttei (Briot) Carrière

Synonyms
- Spiraea aquilegiifolia var. vanhouttei Briot; Spiraea × vanhouttei var. phyllothyrsa Zabel

= Spiraea × vanhouttei =

Species of plant

Spiraea × vanhouttei, called Van Houtte's spiraea, Vanhoutte spirea, or bridal wreath, is an artificial hybrid species of flowering plant in the family Rosaceae. Its parents are Spiraea cantoniensis, Reeves' spirea, (from southeastern China) and Spiraea trilobata, the Asian meadowsweet, (from Central Asia, southern Siberia, and northern China). A vigorous deciduous shrub reaching 2 m (7 ft), it is typically found in human-influenced situations such as old hedges, homesteads, and alongside roads at elevations from sea level to 2,000 m (6,600 ft). Although considered introduced in Europe and the eastern United States, it appears to be sterile.

== In cultivation ==
The original cross was made by Charles Billiard at Fontenay-aux-Roses and released to the public in 1862, and was popularized by Louis van Houtte. Within a century it was thought to be the most widely planted deciduous shrub in the US. Hardy to USDA zone 3a, best results are had by pruning any stems that have turned woody back to ground level after the April to May flowering period. There are a number of cultivars, with 'Gold Fountain' and 'Pink Ice' being readily available from commercial nurseries.
