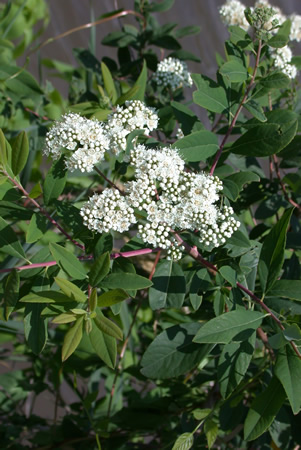

Conservation status
- Imperiled (NatureServe)

- Threatened (ESA)

Scientific classification
- Kingdom: Plantae
- Clade: Tracheophytes
- Clade: Angiosperms
- Clade: Eudicots
- Clade: Rosids
- Order: Rosales
- Family: Rosaceae
- Genus: Spiraea
- Species: S. virginiana

Binomial name
- Spiraea virginiana Britt.

= Spiraea virginiana =

Species of flowering plant

Spiraea virginiana is a rare species of flowering plant in the rose family (Rosaceae) known by the common names Virginia meadowsweet and Virginia spiraea. It is native to the southern Appalachian Mountains, where it has a distribution scattered across nine states. However, most populations are very small and poor in quality. It is threatened by disturbances in the hydrology of its habitat, introduced species of plants, and other threats. It is a federally listed threatened species of the United States.

This plant is a shrub growing one to three meters (3–10 feet) tall. It is clonal, with several cloned individuals growing in clumps. The leaves are variable in shape and size and may have smooth or toothed edges. The inflorescence is a dense corymb of many cream-white flowers, each flower about 0.6 centimeters wide. The fruit is a follicle. Flowering occurs in June and July. Though the plant produces many flowers, it rarely reproduces sexually and rarely produces seeds. Instead, it reproduces vegetatively by cloning, producing many new sprouts which grow into shrubs. There are fewer than 30 genotypes in total, meaning there are fewer than 30 individual sets of genes; all the other plants are clones of one of the 30 types.

This plant is a rare member of the flora in the southern Appalachians. It grows in riparian habitat, such as floodplains and riverbanks. When it was determined to be a threatened species in 1990 there were 24 known occurrences in six states. It could be found at two creeks in Georgia, the New River, Little Tennessee River, Nolichucky River, and South Toe River in North Carolina, the Clear Fork and other rivers in Tennessee, the Russell Fork, Pound River, New River, and Guest River in Virginia, the Bluestone River, Buckhannon River, Gauley River, and Meadow River in West Virginia, Rockcastle River and other creeks in Kentucky, and other rivers. Besides these populations there are occasional occurrences along rivers and creeks. It is also known from Alabama and Ohio. It is thought to have been extirpated from the state of Pennsylvania, due to the changes to the Youghiogheny River (the "Yough") caused by damming.

This shrub grows in cracks in rocks alongside flowing water. It has a fibrous mass of roots and lateral rhizomes that anchor it, and even if most of the plant is ripped away during flooding, it easily resprouts from remnants of the rhizomes. It is often found growing in sandstone bedrock, gravel bars, nooks between boulders, and in riverborne deposits of debris, rubble, and silt. It is adapted to periodic flooding, scouring, erosion, and deposition of litter. Other plants in the habitat may include hazel alder (Alnus serrulata), silky dogwood (Cornus amomum), jewelweed (Impatiens capensis), creepers (Parthenocissus), ninebark (Physocarpus opulifolius), sycamore species (Platanus), blackberries (Rubus), willow species (Salix), American elderberry (Sambucus canadensis), soapworts (Saponaria), greenbrier species (Smilax), goldenrod species (Solidago), and poison ivy (Toxicodendron radicans).

The plant is threatened by its small numbers, alterations in the hydrology of its riparian habitat, and habitat fragmentation. Populations are isolated from one another, reducing the frequency of its rare sexual reproduction even further. Populations are small; though the plant is adapted to a regime of flooding, unusually large floods have the potential to wipe out small populations. The invasion of introduced plant species, including the shrub's relative, Spiraea japonica (Japanese spiraea), may be a threat because of competition.
