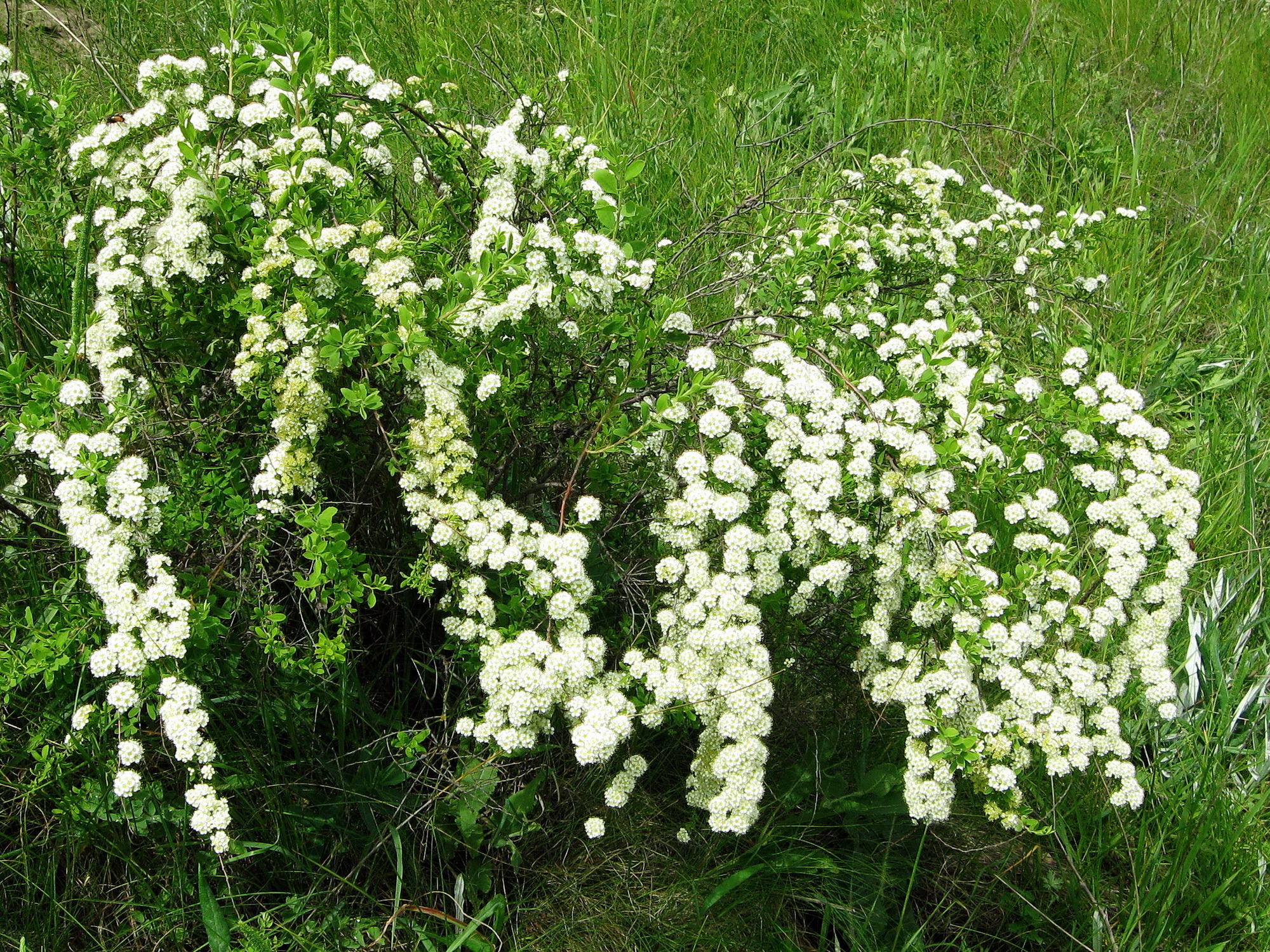
- In Zaporizhzhia

Scientific classification
- Kingdom: Plantae
- Clade: Tracheophytes
- Clade: Angiosperms
- Clade: Eudicots
- Clade: Rosids
- Order: Rosales
- Family: Rosaceae
- Genus: Spiraea
- Species: S. crenata

Binomial name
- Spiraea crenata L.

Synonyms
- List: Spiraea besseriana (Ser.) Sweet; Spiraea crenata var. heterophylla Schur; Spiraea crenata var. homophylla Schur; Spiraea crenata f. puberula Litv.; Spiraea crenata var. parvifolia Pau; Spiraea crenifolia var. capitata Maxim.; Spiraea crenifolia var. capitata Trautv.; Spiraea crenifolia f. glaberrima Korsh.; Spiraea crenifolia f. glabrata Litv.; Spiraea crenifolia f. glabrata Litv. ex Pojark.; Spiraea crenifolia var. integrifolia Regel ex Pojark.; Spiraea crenifolia var. pallasiana Maxim.; Spiraea crenifolia var. pallasii Litv. ex Pojark.; Spiraea crenifolia f. puberula Litv. ex Pojark.; Spiraea crenifolia var. parvifolia (Pau) C.Vicioso; Spiraea denticulata Raf.; Spiraea hypericifolia var. besseriana Ser.; Spiraea hypericifolia var. crenata (L.) Ser.; Spiraea hypericifolia var. latifolia C.A.Mey. & Bunge; Spiraea hypericifolia var. longifolia C.A.Mey. & Bunge; Spiraea hypericifolia var. sawranica (Besser) Ser.; Spiraea hypericifolia var. uralensis Ser.; Spiraea laciniata Raf.; Spiraea litwinowii Dobrocz.; Spiraea nicoviensis Besser ex Link; Spiraea pulverulenta Raf.; Spiraea sawranica Besser; Spiraea uralensis (Ser.) Sweet; Spiraea vacciniifolia C.K.Schneid.

= Spiraea crenata =

- Branch in flower

Species of plant

Spiraea crenata, the scalloped spirea, is a species of flowering plant in the family Rosaceae. It is native to northeastern Spain, southeastern Europe, parts of Russia, southwestern Siberia, northwestern Kazakhstan, and the Altai, and has gone extinct in Hungary. A deciduous shrub reaching 0.6 to 1.2 m (2 to 4 ft), it is found growing in chalky mountainous areas on slopes and in scrublands. A low-maintenance ornamental, it is hardy in USDA Zones 4 through 8, and prefers full sun.

== Subtaxa ==
The following subspecies are accepted:

- Spiraea crenata subsp. crenata – entire range, except northeastern Spain
- Spiraea crenata subsp. parvifolia (Pau) Romo – northeastern Spain
