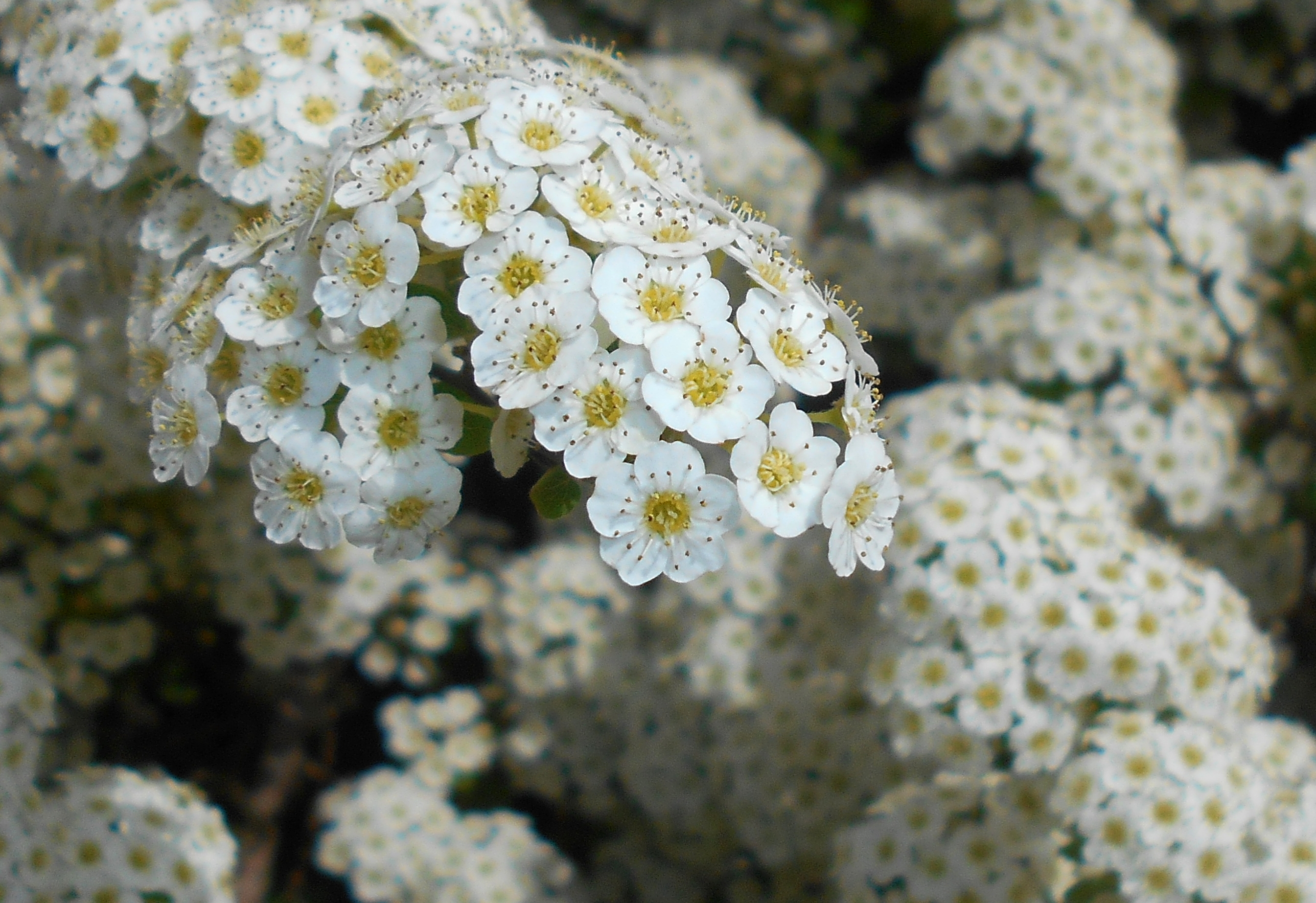

Scientific classification
- Kingdom: Plantae
- Clade: Tracheophytes
- Clade: Angiosperms
- Clade: Eudicots
- Clade: Rosids
- Order: Rosales
- Family: Rosaceae
- Genus: Spiraea
- Species: S. trilobata

Binomial name
- Spiraea trilobata L.

= Spiraea trilobata =

Species of flowering plant

Spiraea trilobata, known as Asian meadowsweet, is a species of flowering plant in the family Rosaceae. It was first formally named in 1771. Spiraea trilobata is native to Asia. It has occasionally naturalized in the United States.
