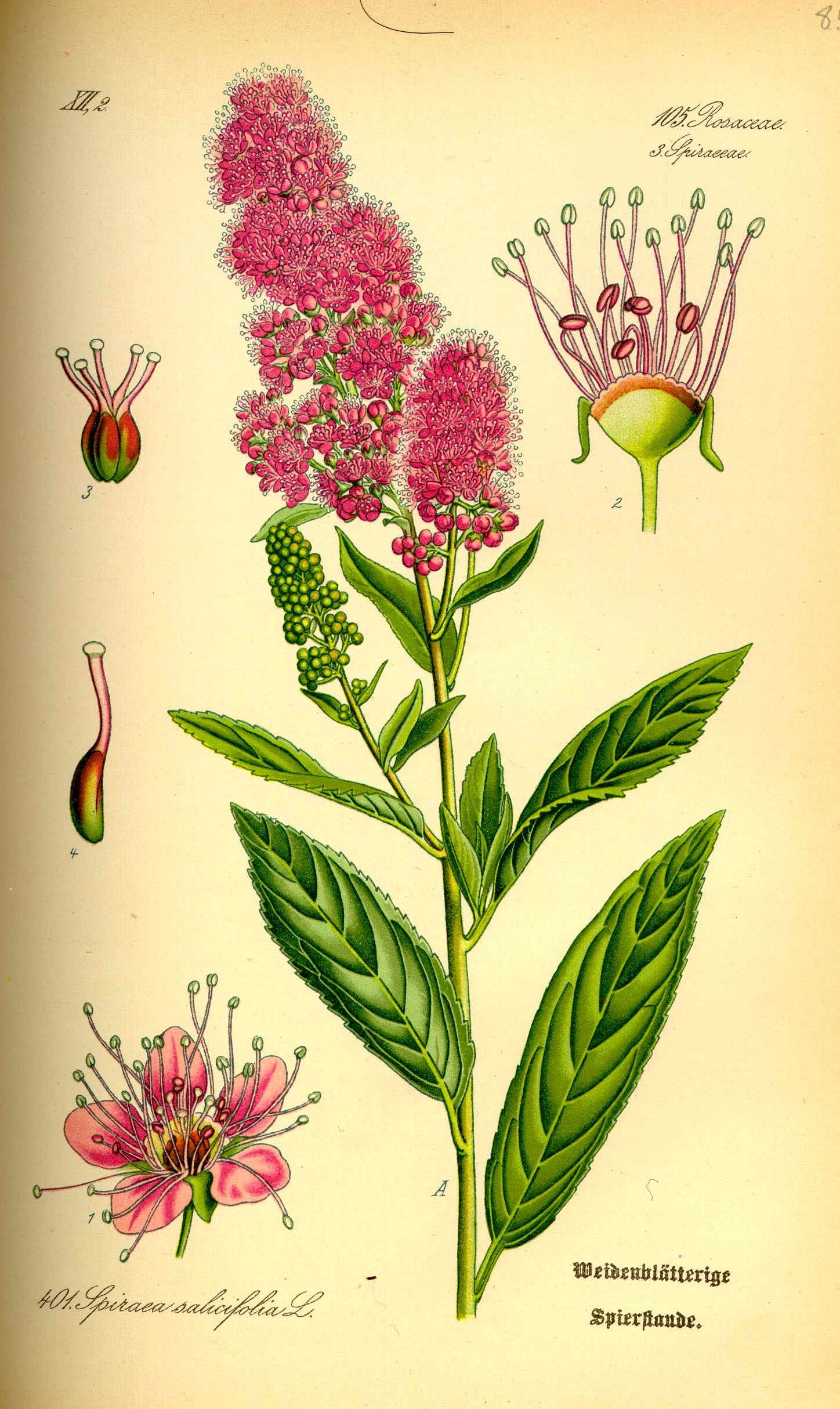
- Spiraea salicifolia

Scientific classification
- Kingdom: Plantae
- Clade: Tracheophytes
- Clade: Angiosperms
- Clade: Eudicots
- Clade: Rosids
- Order: Rosales
- Family: Rosaceae
- Subfamily: Amygdaloideae
- Tribe: Spiraeeae
- Genus: Spiraea; L.

Species
- About 80-100, see text

= Spiraea =

Genus of plants

Spiraea /spaɪˈriːə/, sometimes spelled spirea in common names, and commonly known as meadowsweets or steeplebushes, is a genus of about 80 to 100 species of shrubs in the family Rosaceae. They are native to the temperate Northern Hemisphere, with the greatest diversity in eastern Asia.

The genus formerly included the herbaceous species now segregated into the genera Filipendula and Aruncus; recent genetic evidence has shown that Filipendula is only distantly related to Spiraea, belonging in the subfamily Rosoideae.

== Description ==
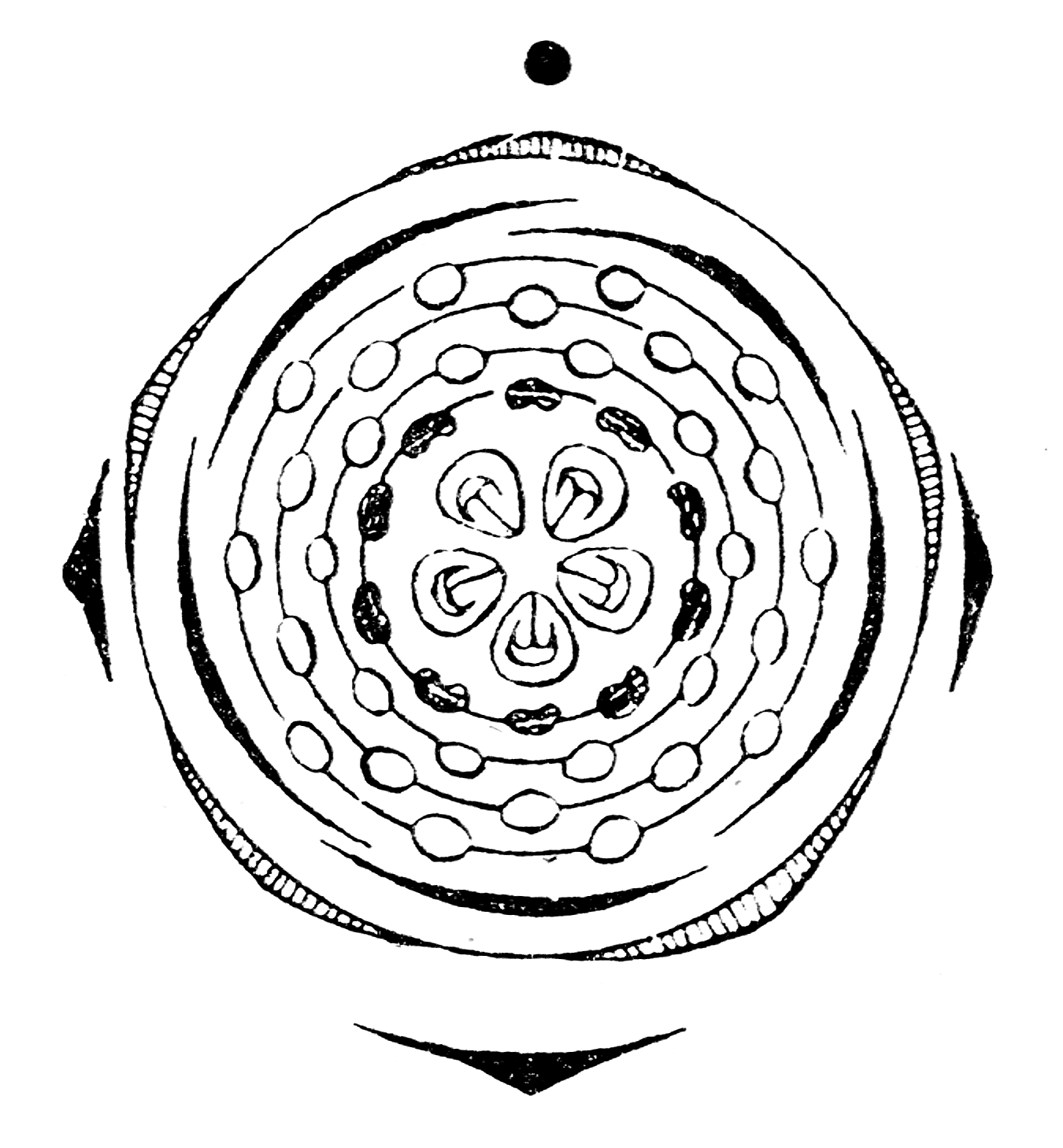
Flower diagram of Spiraea hypericifolia

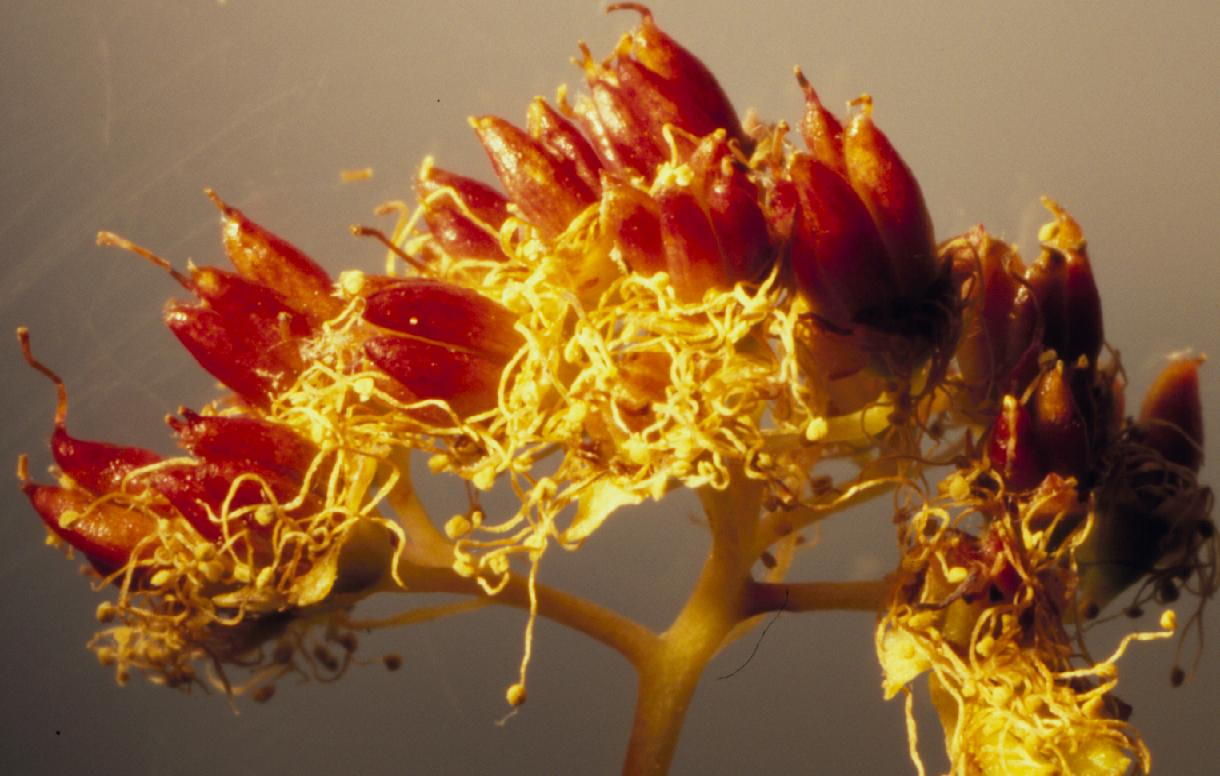
Spiraea betulifolia

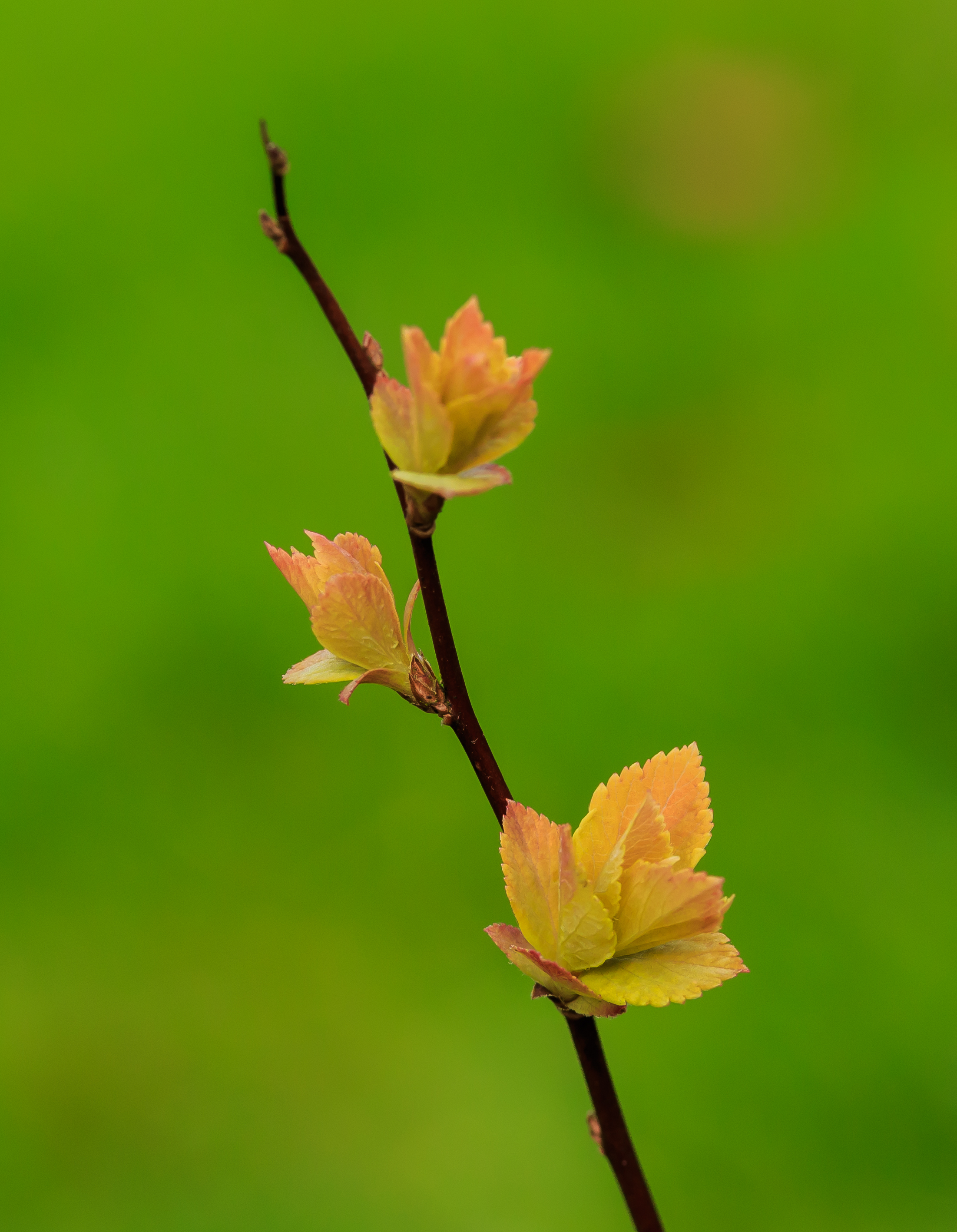
Spiraea japonica 'Goldflame' 06

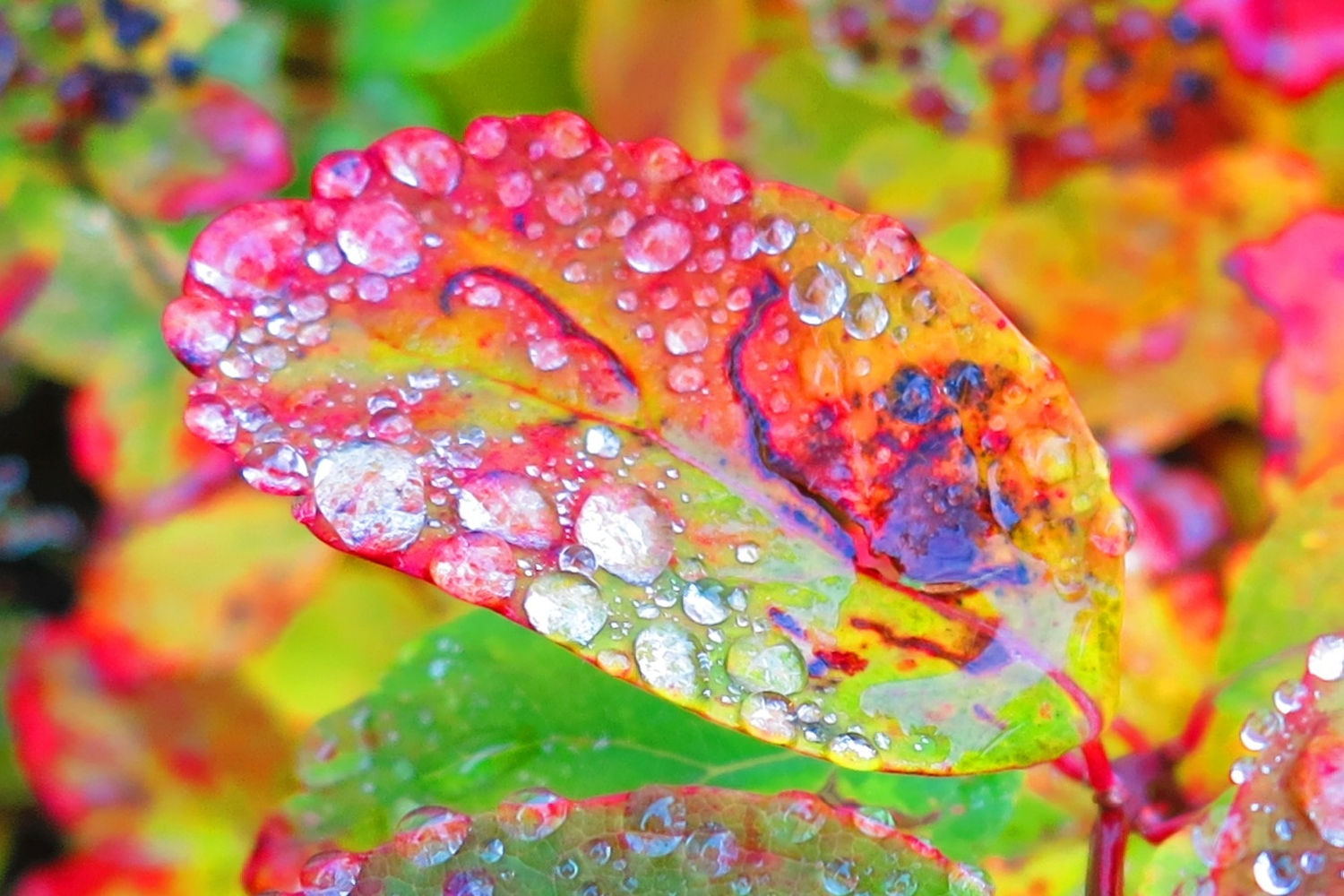
Spiraea betulifolia in autumn

Spiraea plants are hardy, deciduous-leaved shrubs. The leaves are simple and usually short stalked, and are arranged in a spiralling, alternate fashion. In most species, the leaves are lanceolate (narrowly oval) and about 2.5 to 10 centimetres (0.98 to 3.94 in) long. The leaf margins are usually toothed, occasionally cut or lobed, and rarely smooth. Stipules are absent.

The many small flowers of Spiraea shrubs are clustered together in inflorescences, usually in dense panicles, umbrella-like corymbs, or grape-like clusters. The radial symmetry of each flower is fivefold, with the flowers usually bisexual, rarely unisexual. The flowers have five sepals and five white, pink, or reddish petals that are usually longer than the sepals. Each flower has many (15 to 60) stamens. The fruit is an aggregate of follicles.

== Ecology ==
Spiraea species are used as food plants by the larvae of many Lepidoptera species, including the brown-tail, the small emperor moth, the grey dagger, the setaceous Hebrew character, and the moth Hypercompe indecisa.

The leaves of S. betulifolia are eaten by blue grouse in spring, and the plant is browsed by deer in summer.

== Uses ==
=== Food ===
Native Americans ate the species S. betulifolia.

=== Horticulture ===
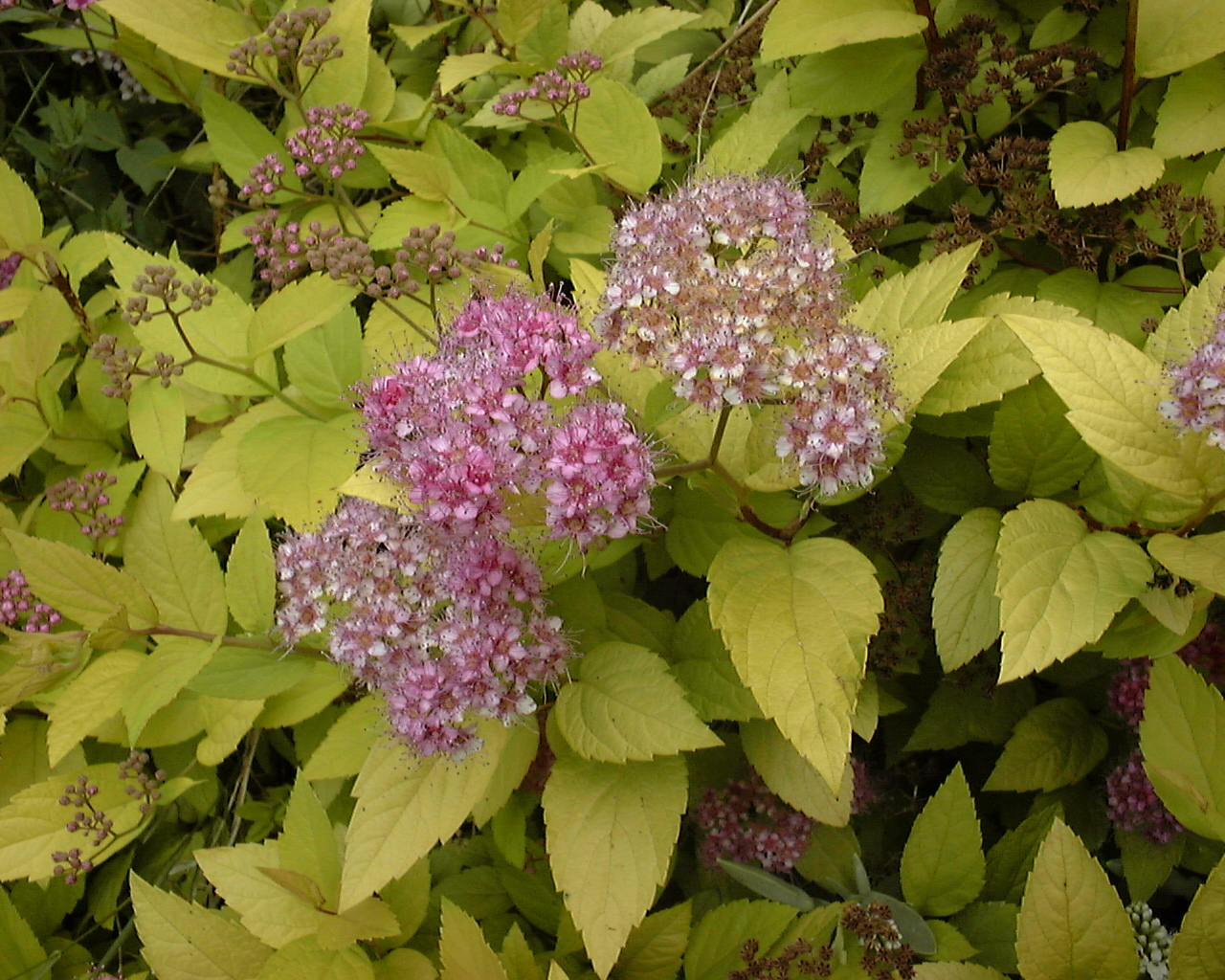
Spiraea japonica

Many species of Spiraea are used as ornamental plants in temperate climates, particularly for their showy clusters of dense flowers. Some species bloom in the spring, others in midsummer.

The following species, hybrids and cultivars are among those found in cultivation:

- S. 'Arguta'
- S. betulifolia
- S. canescens
- S. cantoniensis
- S. × cinerea
- S. douglasii
- S. japonica
- S. nipponica
- S. prunifolia
- S. × pseudosalicifolia
- S. salicifolia
- S. 'Snow White'
- S. thunbergii
- S. trichocarpa
- S. × vanhouttei
- S. veitchii

Spiraea 'Arguta' (bridal wreath) and Spiraea × cinerea 'Grefsheim' have won the Royal Horticultural Society's Award of Garden Merit.

=== Traditional medicine ===
Spiraea contain salicylates. Acetylsalicylic acid was first isolated from Filipendula ulmaria, a species at the time classified in the genus Spiraea. The word "aspirin" was coined by adding a- (for acetylation) to spirin, from the German Spirsäure, a reference to Spiraea.

Native American groups have various medicinal uses for local Spiraea species. S. betulifolia is used for abdominal pain and made into a tea. The Blackfoot use S. splendens root in an enema and to treat venereal conditions.

=== Other ===
Native Americans found S. douglasii useful for making brooms and hanging seafood to cook.

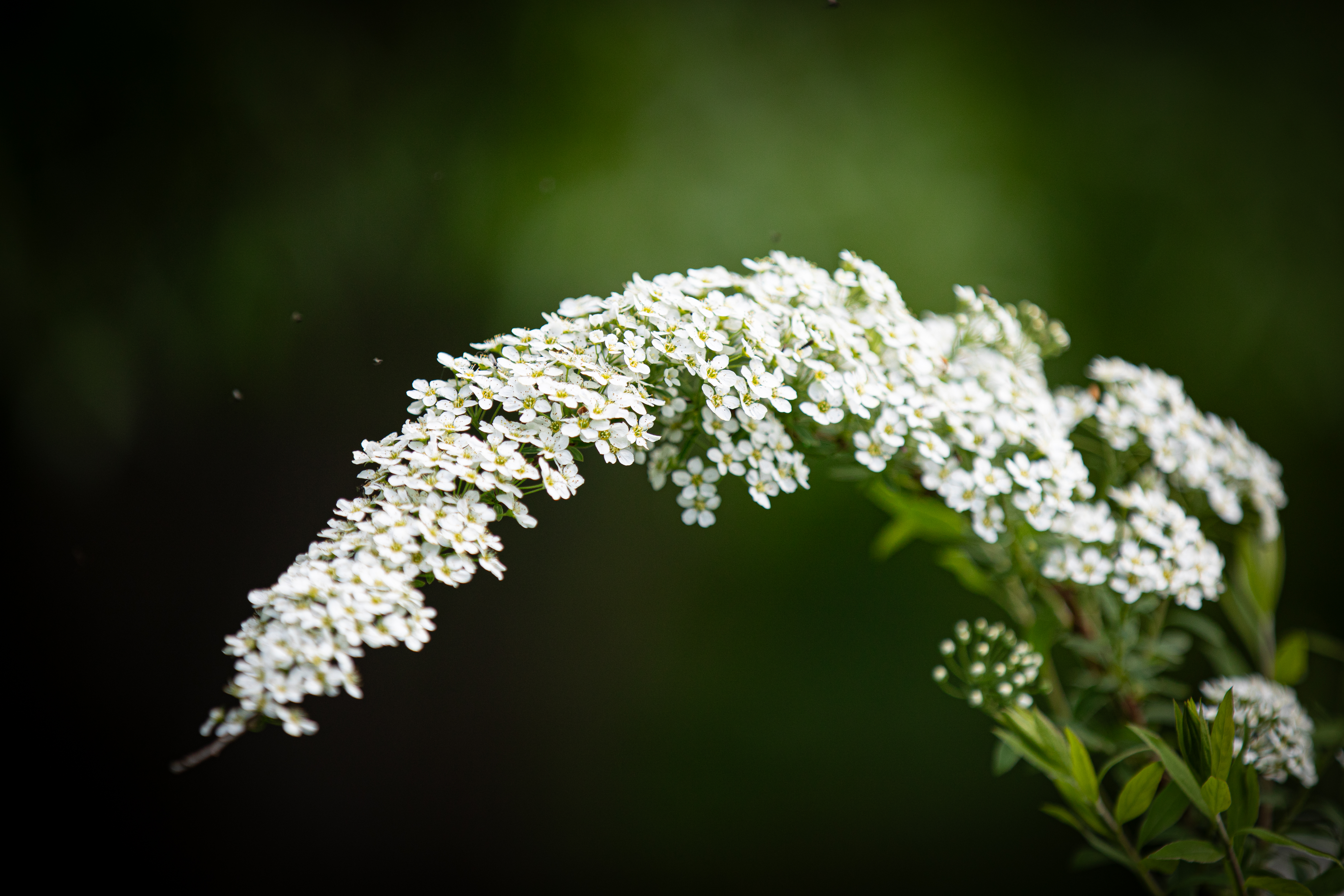
Spiraea × cinerea 'Grefsheim' inflorescence

One detrimental issue with Spiraea species is that they are loved by carpet beetles; this can then encourage the pests into nearby houses.

== Species ==
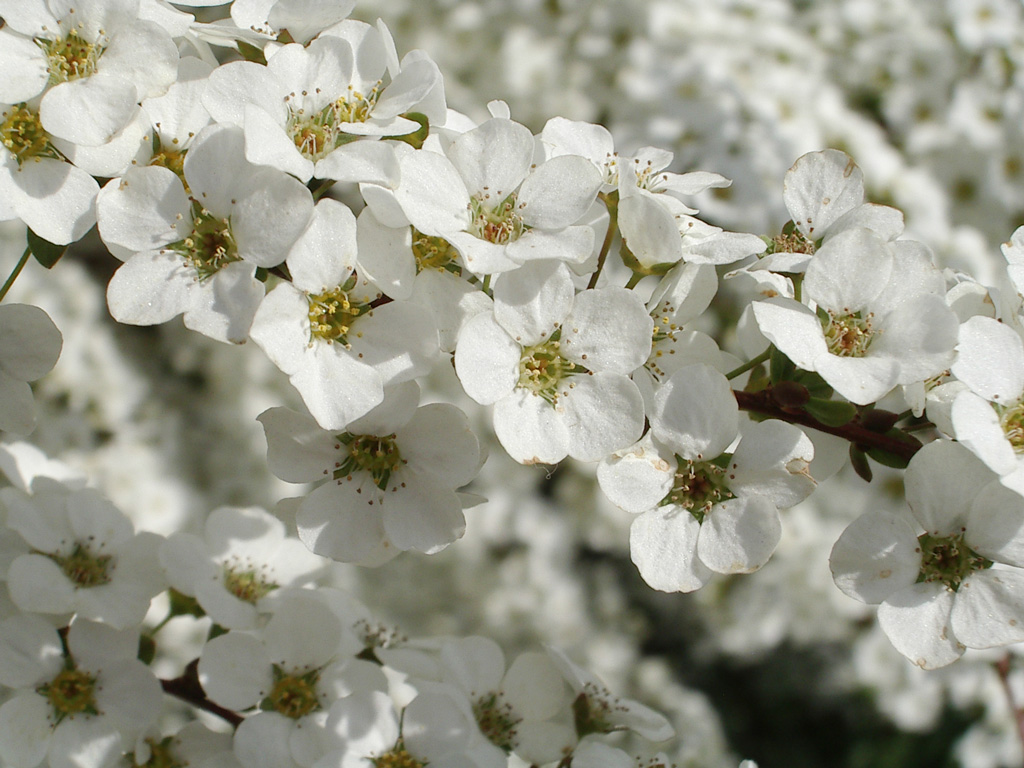
Spiraea thunbergii

- Spiraea affinis
- Spiraea alaskaense
- Spiraea alba – narrow-leaved meadowsweet, pale bridewort
- Spiraea albiflora
- Spiraea amoena
- Spiraea arcuata
- Spiraea baldschuanica
- Spiraea bella
- Spiraea betulifolia – white meadowsweet
- Spiraea blumei
- Spiraea calcicola
- Spiraea cana
- Spiraea canescens – Himalayan spiraea
- Spiraea cantoniensis – Reeve's spiraea
- Spiraea chamaedryfolia – elm-leaf spiraea, germander meadowsweet
- Spiraea crenata
- Spiraea decumbens
- Spiraea douglasii – Douglas' spiraea, steeplebush
- Spiraea gemmata
- Spiraea henryi
- Spiraea hypericifolia – Iberian meadowsweet
- Spiraea japonica – Japanese spiraea
- Spiraea latifolia - broadleaf meadowsweet
- Spiraea longigemmis
- Spiraea lucida
- Spiraea media – Russian spiraea
- Spiraea micrantha
- Spiraea miyabei
- Spiraea mollifolia
- Spiraea nervosa
- Spiraea nipponica
- Spiraea prunifolia – bridal-wreath spiraea
- Spiraea pubescens
- Spiraea rosthornii
- Spiraea salicifolia – bridewort, willowleaf meadowsweet
- Spiraea sargentiana
- Spiraea septentrionalis – northern meadowsweet
- Spiraea splendens – rose meadowsweet
- Spiraea stevenii – beauverd spirea
- Spiraea thunbergii – Thunberg's meadowsweet
- Spiraea tomentosa – hardhack, steeplebush
- Spiraea trichocarpa – Korean meadow spiraea
- Spiraea trilobata – Asian meadowsweet
- Spiraea veitchii
- Spiraea virginiana – Virginia spiraea
- Spiraea wilsonii
- Spiraea yunnanensis

== Formerly placed here ==
- Spiraea lobata, moved to Filipendula rubra
- Spiraea discolor, moved to Holodiscus discolor

== Hybrids ==
There are also numerous named hybrids, some occurring naturally in the wild, others bred in gardens, including several important ornamental plants:

- Spiraea × arguta (S. × multiflora × S. thunbergii) – garland spiraea
- Spiraea × billiardii (S. douglasii × S. salicifolia) – Billiard's spiraea
- Spiraea × blanda (S. nervosa × S. cantoniensis)
- Spiraea × brachybotrys (S. canescens × S. douglasii)
- Spiraea × bumalda (S. japonica × S. albiflora)
- Spiraea × cinerea (S. hypericifolia × S. cana)
- Spiraea × conspicua (S. japonica × S. latifolia)
- Spiraea × fontenaysii (S. canescens × S. salicifolia)
- Spiraea × foxii (S. japonica × S. betulifolia)
- Spiraea × gieseleriana (S. cana × S. chamaedryfolia)
- Spiraea × macrothyrsa (S. douglasii × S. latifolia)
- Spiraea × multiflora (S. crenata × S. hypericifolia)
- Spiraea × notha (S. betulifolia × S. latifolia)
- Spiraea × nudiflora (S. chamaedryfolia × S. bella)
- Spiraea × pikoviensis (S. crenata × S. media)
- Spiraea × pyramidata (S. betulifolia × S. douglasii) – pyramid spiraea
- Spiraea × revirescens (S. amoena × S. japonica)
- Spiraea × sanssouciana (S. japonica × S. douglasii)
- Spiraea × schinabeckii (S. chamaedryfolia × S. trilobata)
- Spiraea × semperflorens (S. japonica × S. salicifolia)
- Spiraea × vanhouttei (S. trilobata × S. cantoniensis) – Van Houtte's spiraea
- Spiraea × watsoniana (S. douglasii × S. densiflora)
