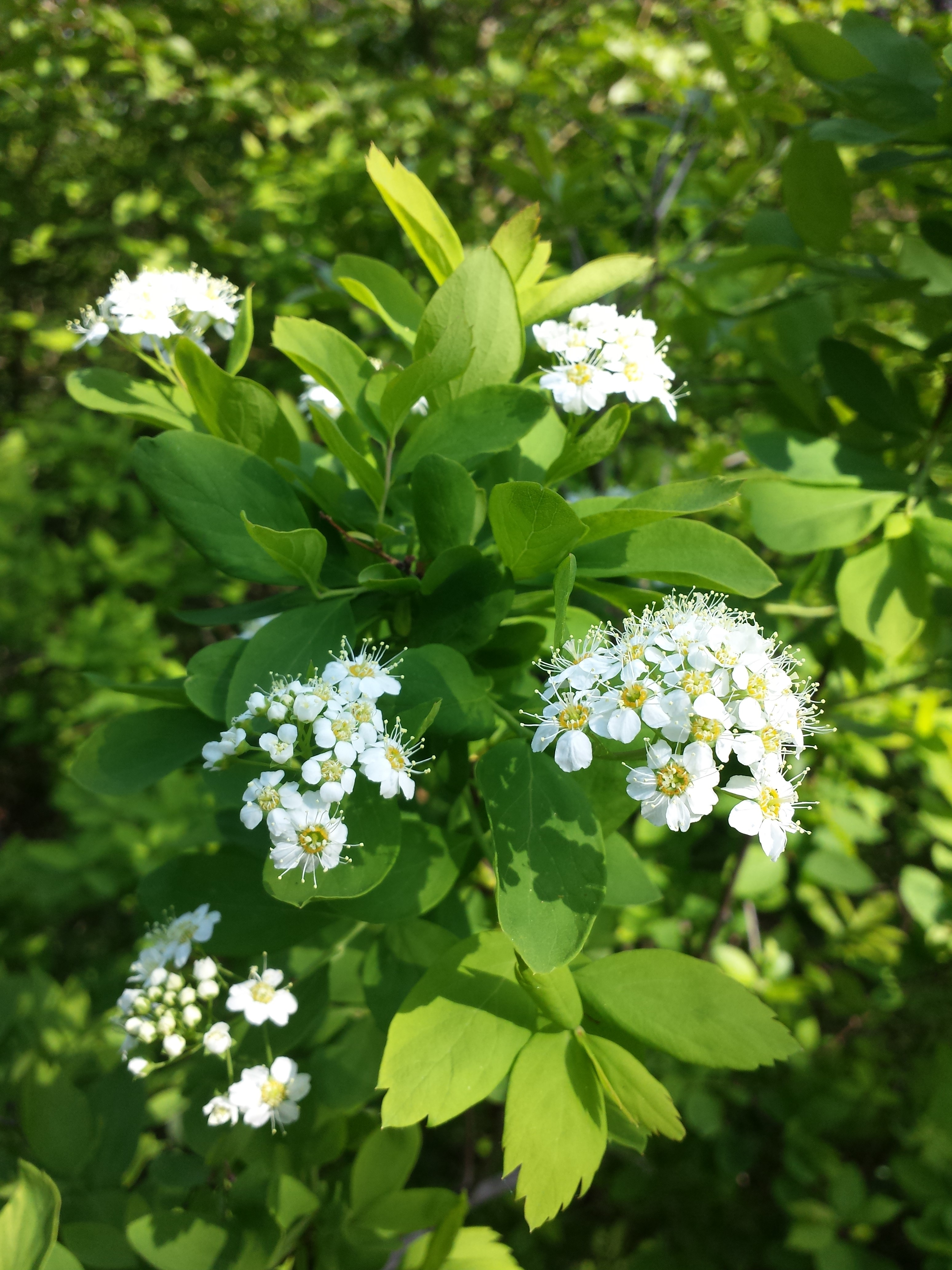
- In the wild, Gutenstein Alps
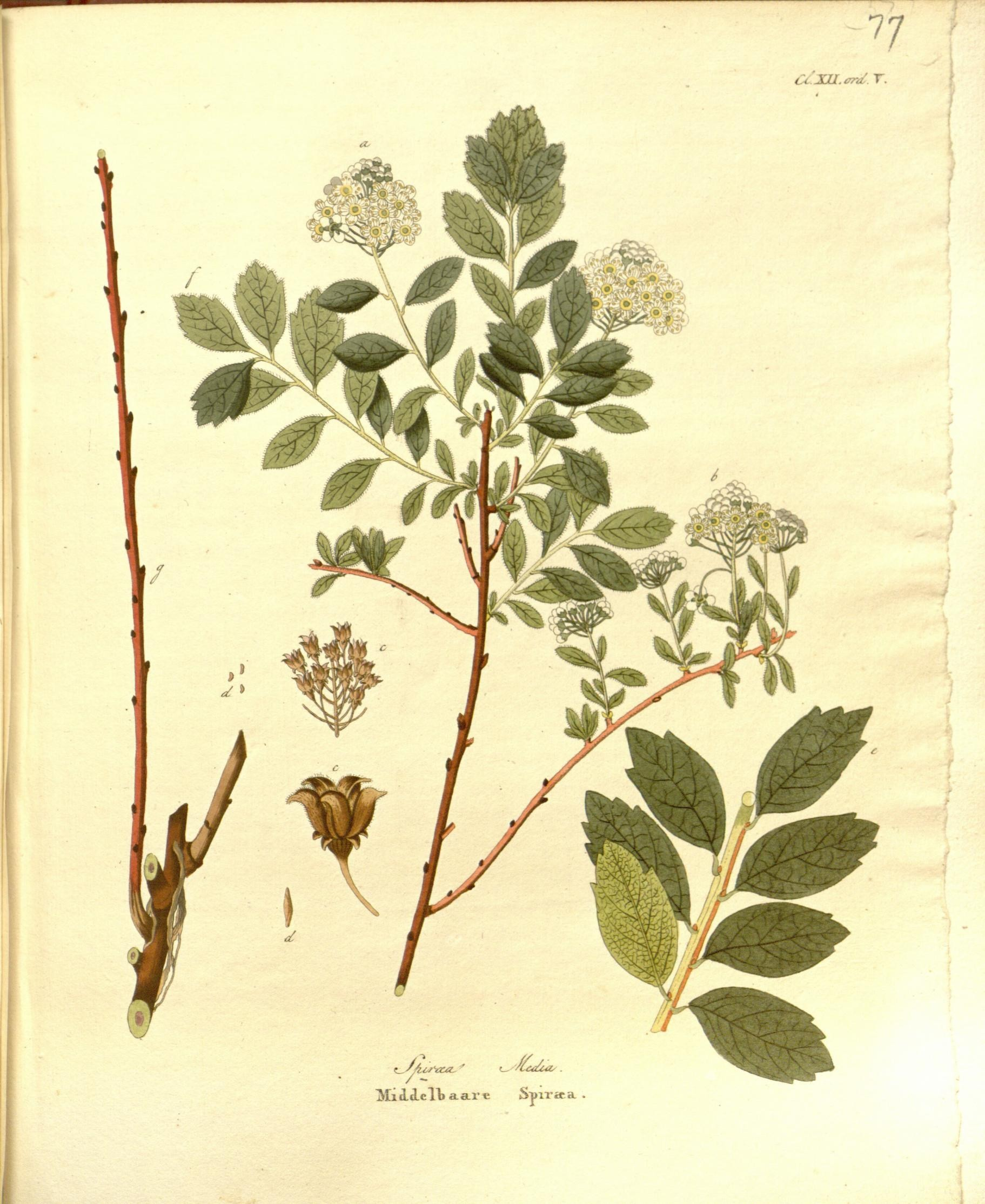
- Botanical illustration

Scientific classification
- Kingdom: Plantae
- Clade: Embryophytes
- Clade: Tracheophytes
- Clade: Spermatophytes
- Clade: Angiosperms
- Clade: Eudicots
- Clade: Rosids
- Order: Rosales
- Family: Rosaceae
- Genus: Spiraea
- Species: S. media

Binomial name
- Spiraea media Schmidt

Synonyms
- List: Spiraea argentea K.Koch; Spiraea chamaedryfolia var. media (Schmidt) Pursh; Spiraea chamaedryfolia var. oblongifolia (Waldst. & Kit.) Cambess.; Spiraea chamaedryfolia subsp. oblongifolia (Waldst. & Kit.) Nyman; Spiraea confusa Regel & Körn.; Spiraea confusa var. sericea (Turcz.) Regel; Spiraea confusa var. subglabra Regel; Spiraea daurica Raf.; Spiraea foliosa Poir.; Spiraea media subsp. confusa (Regel & Körn.) Juel, Cedergr. & Örtendahl; Spiraea media var. glabrescens Simonk.; Spiraea media f. glabrescens (Simonk.) Zabel; Spiraea media var. leiantha Borbás; Spiraea media var. mollis (K.Koch & C.D.Bouché) C.K.Schneid.; Spiraea media var. monbetsuensis (Franch.) Cardot ex Nakai; Spiraea media var. oblongifolia (Waldst. & Kit.) Dippel; Spiraea media f. oblongifolia Beck; Spiraea media subsp. oblongifolia (Waldst. & Kit.) Juel, R.E.Fr. & Örtendahl; Spiraea media f. pilosiuscula Zabel; Spiraea media subsp. sericea (Turcz.) Juel, R.E.Fr. & Örtendahl; Spiraea media var. sericea (Turcz.) Regel ex Maxim.; Spiraea media f. subintegerrima Zabel; Spiraea media var. typica Buia; Spiraea mollis K.Koch & C.D.Bouché; Spiraea monbetsusensis Franch.; Spiraea oblongifolia Waldst. & Kit.; Spiraea sericea Turcz.

= Spiraea media =

Species of plant

Spiraea media, the Russian spiraea, is a species of flowering plant in the family Rosaceae. It is native to cool-temperate Eurasia, from Austria to Kamchatka, and it has been introduced to Great Britain, Germany, the Baltic States, Belarus, and central European Russia. An erect shrub reaching 2 m (7 ft), it is typically found in mixed broadleaf/coniferous forests and on grassy or rocky slopes at elevations from 700 to 1,800 m (2,000 to 6,000 ft). There appear to be cultivars, with 'Smsmbk' (trade designation Double Play Blue Kazoo) being more compact at 60 cm (2 ft).

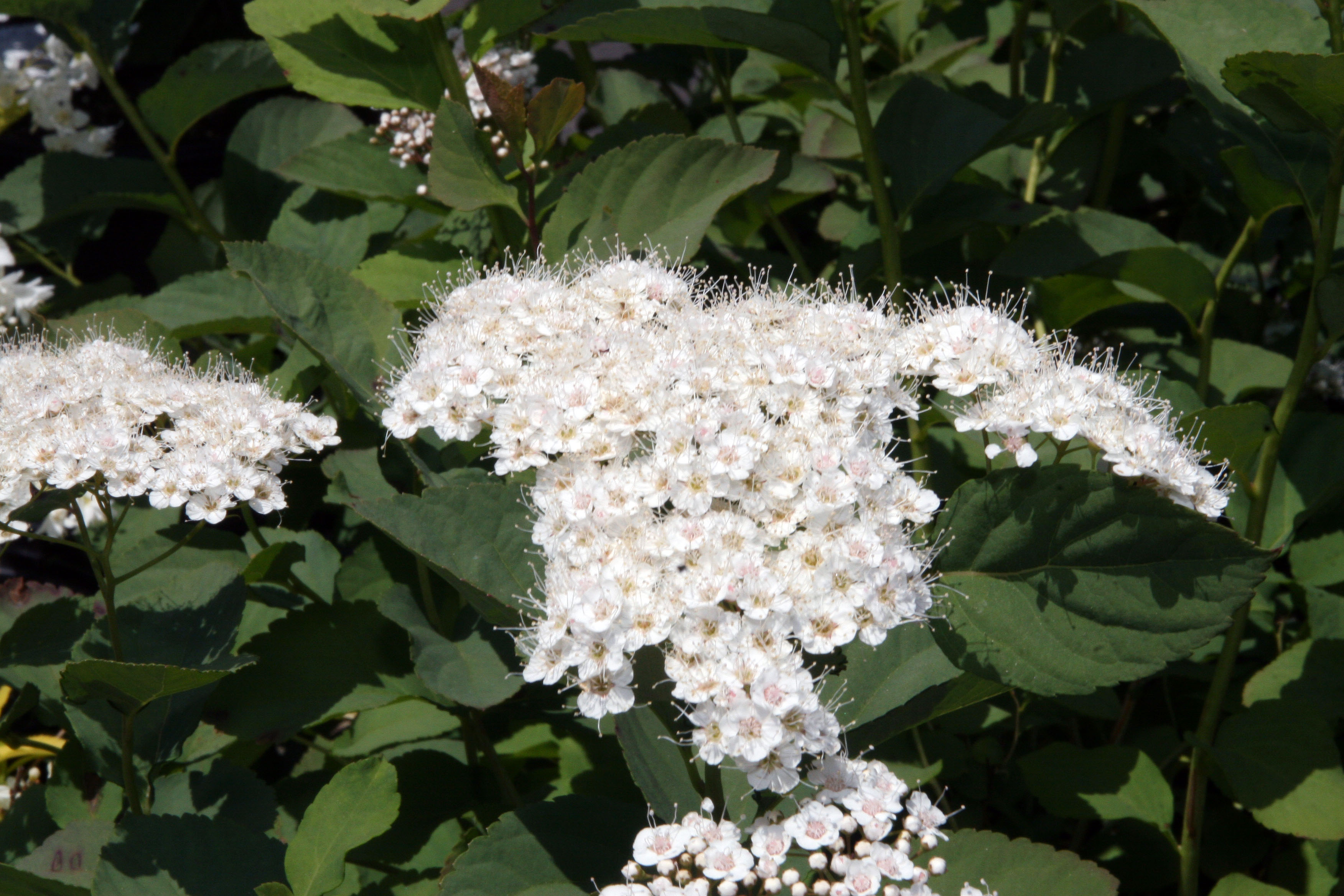
'Snow Storm' cultivar

== Subtaxa ==
The following subspecies are accepted:

- Spiraea media subsp. media – entire range
- Spiraea media subsp. polonica (Błocki) Dostál – Ukraine
