= Snow-in-summer =

Snow-in-summer is a common name or term used for several different plants, namely those that have showy clusters of white-coloured flowers which bloom in summer or late spring:

- Cerastium tomentosum, a low-growing flowering plant of European origin
- Melaleuca linariifolia, also known as the narrow-leaved paperbark and flax-leaved paperbark, which produces snow white coloured flowers in the summer
- Melaleuca decora, an Australian tree that displays creamy-coloured flowers in summer.
- Spiraea cantoniensis, a Chinese shrub that produces clusters of snow-white flowers in late spring and summer.
- Philadelphus, a genus that has a few cultivars with white flowers that bloom in summer.
- Iberis sempervirens, a subshrub that produces pure white flowers in late spring and early summer.
- Lobularia maritima, a cultivar of this species ('White Alyssum') displays snow white flowers in spring and summer.
- Raphiolepis indica, a cultivar of this species ('Snow Maiden') displays white flowers in summer and other seasons as well, but intermittently.
- Hydrangea, a genus which contains the cultivar 'Runaway Bride Snow White' that has creamy white flowers which bloom in spring and summer.
- Crataegus crus-galli, a small deciduous tree or shrub that displays snow white flowers in the summer.
- Cherry blossom, a flower of several trees of genus Prunus, which produce, among other colours, vibrantly white flowers in spring and summer.

== See also ==
- The Injustice to Dou E, a Chinese play also known as Snow in Summer
