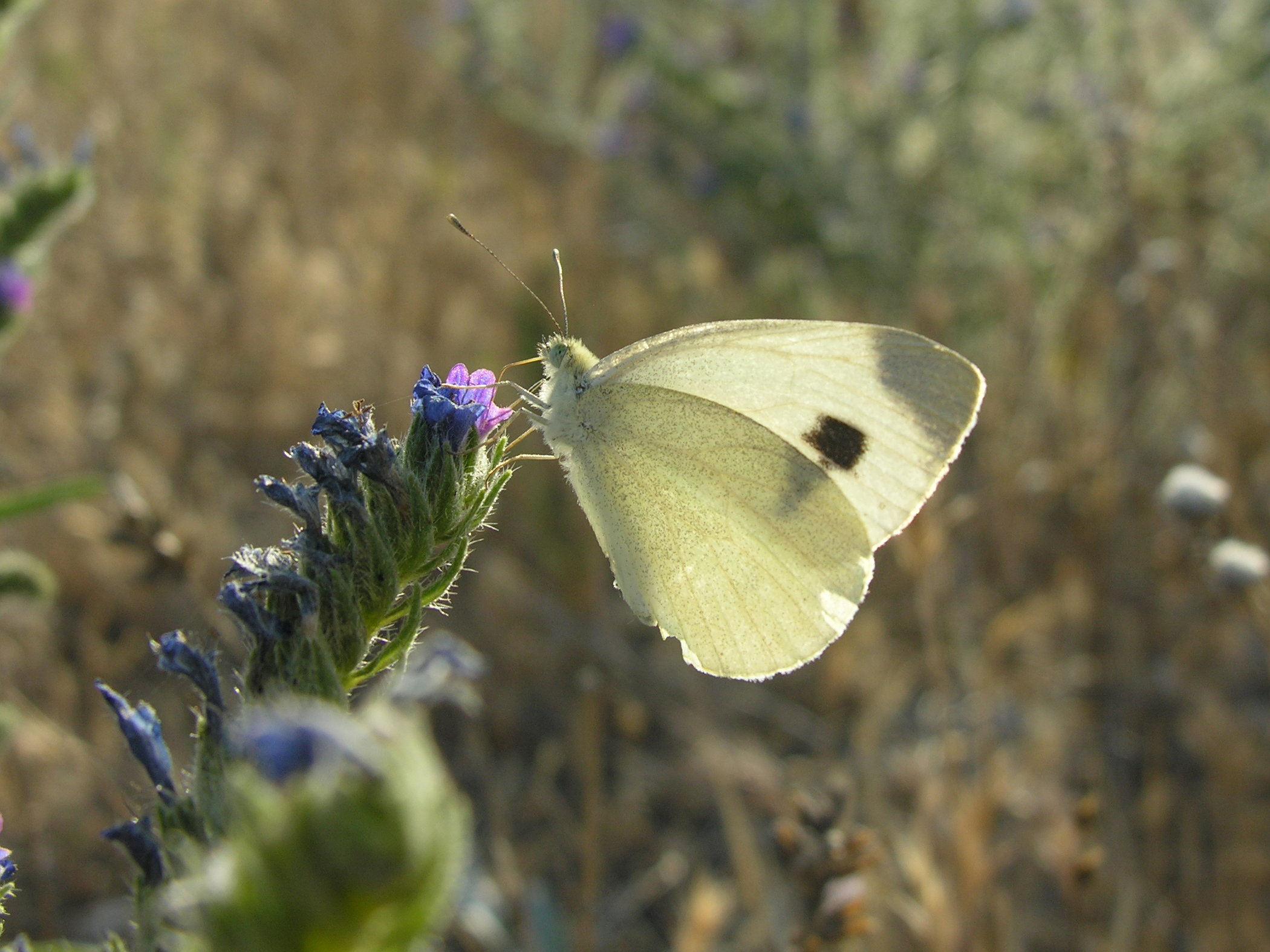

Scientific classification
- Kingdom: Animalia
- Phylum: Arthropoda
- Clade: Pancrustacea
- Class: Insecta
- Order: Lepidoptera
- Family: Pieridae
- Genus: Pieris
- Species: P. mannii

Binomial name
- Pieris mannii (Mayer, 1851)

= Pieris mannii =

Southern small white

Species of butterfly

Pieris mannii (southern small white) is a butterfly in the family Pieridae.

The length of the forewings is 19–25 mm.

== Description in Seitz ==
P. manni Mayer and rossii Stef [Pieris rapae var. rossii Stefanelli, 1900] are treated by us as forms of a separate species in accordance with the observations of Count Emilio Turati communicated to us by letter. The larva is not yet known, but the shape of the pupa appears to afford sufficient proofof the specific distinctness of the insect. The pupa is not greenish as the rapae-pupa, but whitish with a reddish tint, being without dark dots and other markings. The spring-form manni differs from rapae gen. vern. metra in the underside being much lighter', and the black markings, especially above, being much more extended. — The summer-form rossii Stef. (20 d) is beneath not much lighter than manni, and also above the black markings are only slightly reduced, though being dusted with white. The species occurs in Italy, the Tyrol, South-Western Europe, according to Elwes also in Tura, according to the material before us in the Taurus, and probably also in other districts of Asia.

The butterfly flies from March to October depending on the location.

== Biology ==
The larva feeds on Cruciferae, especially Iberis sempervirens and Sinapis.

== Identification ==
Compared to Pieris rapae, the cabbage-pest small white, the forewing spot is larger and squarish or even crescent-shaped rather than round. The apex marking extends further down the outer margin, reaching as far as the spot.

== Range ==
Until relatively recently, P. mannii has been confined to South Europe, Asia Minor, Morocco and Syria. It was first found north of the Alps in France and in Germany in 2008 and has since gradually extended its range in these two countries. It was first sighted in the southern Netherlands in 2015, Calais in 2019 and Suffolk, UK in 2025.

== Etymology ==
Named for Josef Johann Mann.
