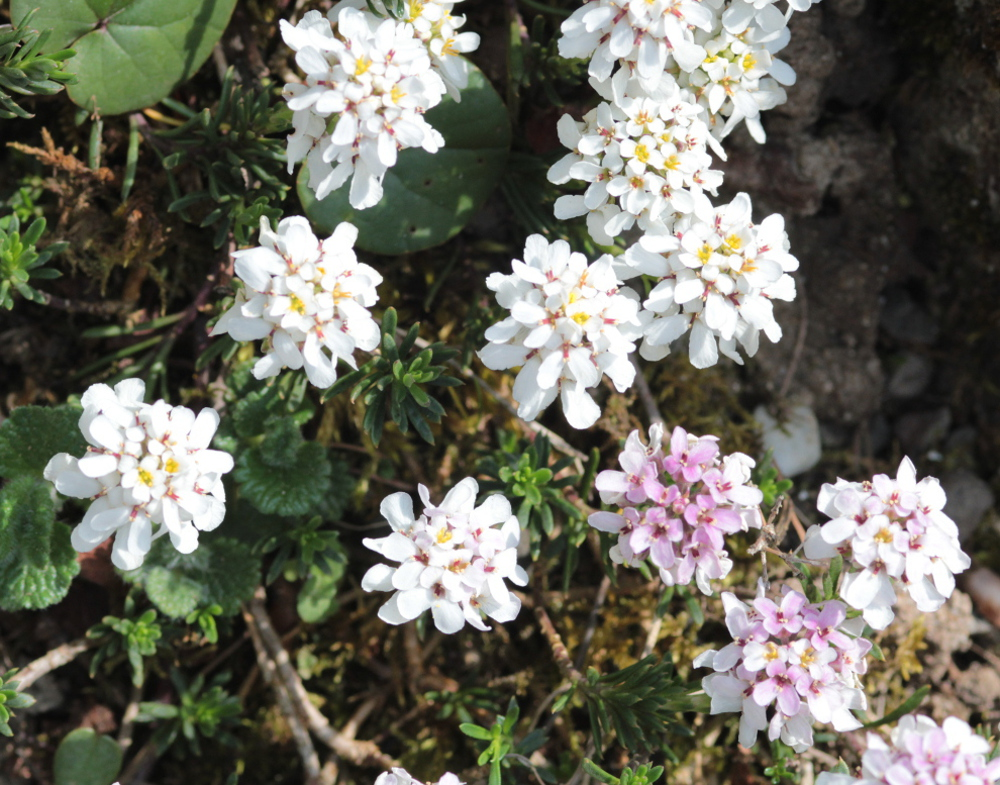

Scientific classification
- Kingdom: Plantae
- Clade: Tracheophytes
- Clade: Angiosperms
- Clade: Eudicots
- Clade: Rosids
- Order: Brassicales
- Family: Brassicaceae
- Genus: Iberis
- Species: I. saxatilis

Binomial name
- Iberis saxatilis L.

Synonyms
- Biauricula saxatilis (L.) Bubani

= Iberis saxatilis =

Species of flowering plant

Iberis saxatilis, the rock candytuft, is a species of flowering plant in the family Brassicaceae, native to southern Europe and northwest Africa. The species is typically used as an ornamental rock and alpine garden perennial plant because of its decorative flowers and cascading growth habit. Iberis is so named because many members of the genus come from the Iberian Peninsula in south west Europe. The species name saxatilis means "growing among rocks," referring to the preferred substrate of this species.

== Range ==
The natural range for this species is Spain, France, Italy, Switzerland, the Balkan Peninsula, the Crimean Peninsula, and Morocco. In 2017, a new subspecies—Iberis saxatilis subsp. magnesiana—was identified in Turkey.

== Description ==
This species is a spreading and low-growing perennial. Depending on the wintertime harshness of its environment, it may be evergreen or semi-evergreen. It produces numerous snowflake-like white flowers, the petals of which take on a pink or purple tinge with age. The plant is able to spread via adventitious rooting of stems that make contact with soil.

== Cultivation ==
Rock candytuft is typically grown in gardens that simulate the rocky alpine conditions of the plant's natural habitat. It thrives and flowers best in full sun with well-drained soil, but will tolerate partial shade. Poorly drained soil often causes crown rot in this species.
