= Corymb =

Botany term describing a certain type of flower growth

Corymb is a botanical term for an inflorescence with the flowers growing in such a fashion that the outermost are borne on longer pedicels than the inner, bringing all flowers up to a common level. A corymb has a flattish top with a superficial resemblance to an umbel, and may have a branching structure similar to a panicle. Flowers in a corymb structure can either be parallel, or alternate, and form in either a convex, or flat form.

Many species in the Maloideae, such as hawthorns and rowans, produce their flowers in corymbs. The Norway maple and yerba maté are also examples of corymbs.

The word corymb is derived from the Ancient Greek word κόρυμβος, korymbos meaning "bunch of flowers or fruit".

Racemose corymb

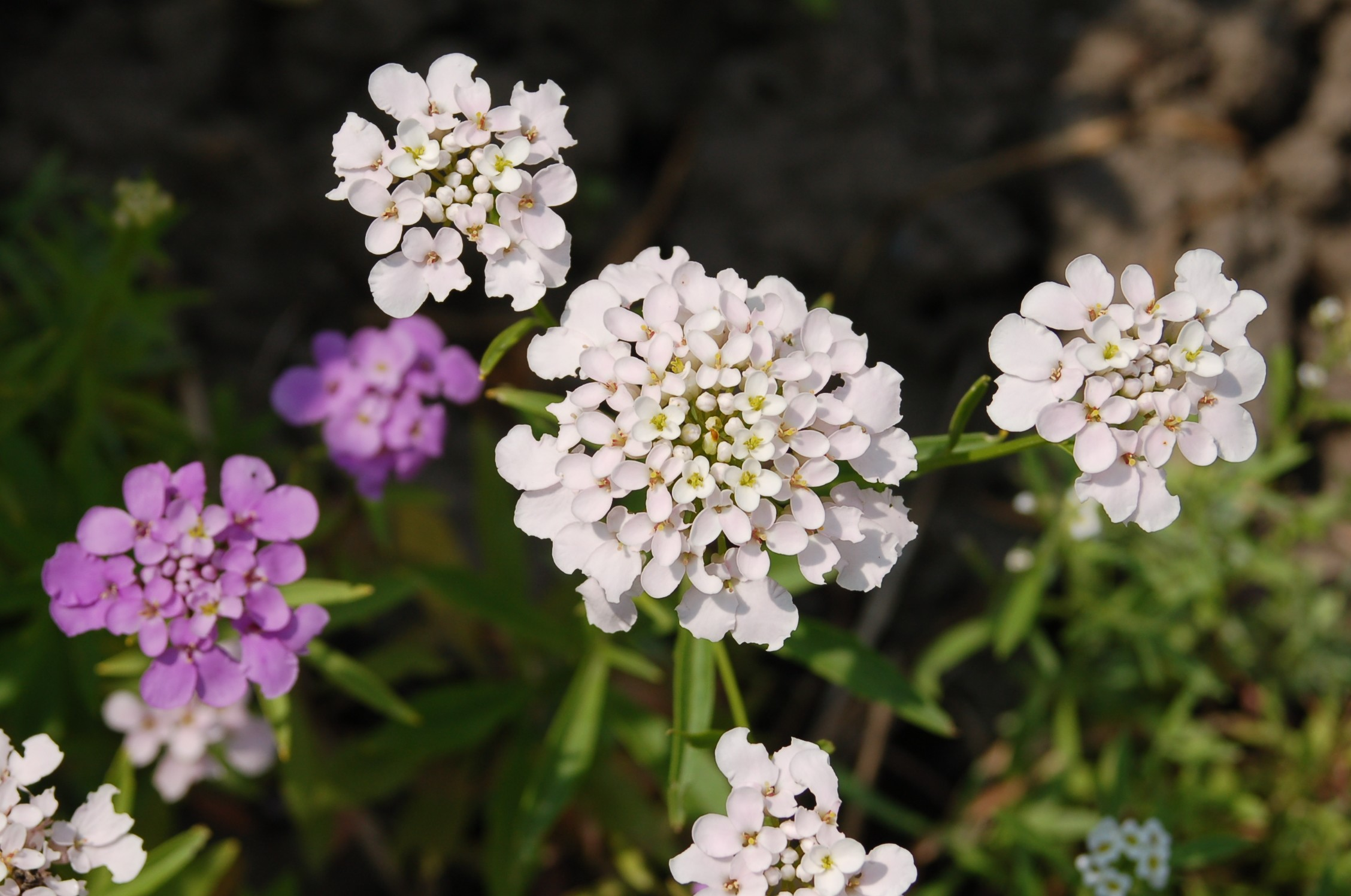
Iberis umbellata or candytuft
(racemose corymb)

Cymose corymb

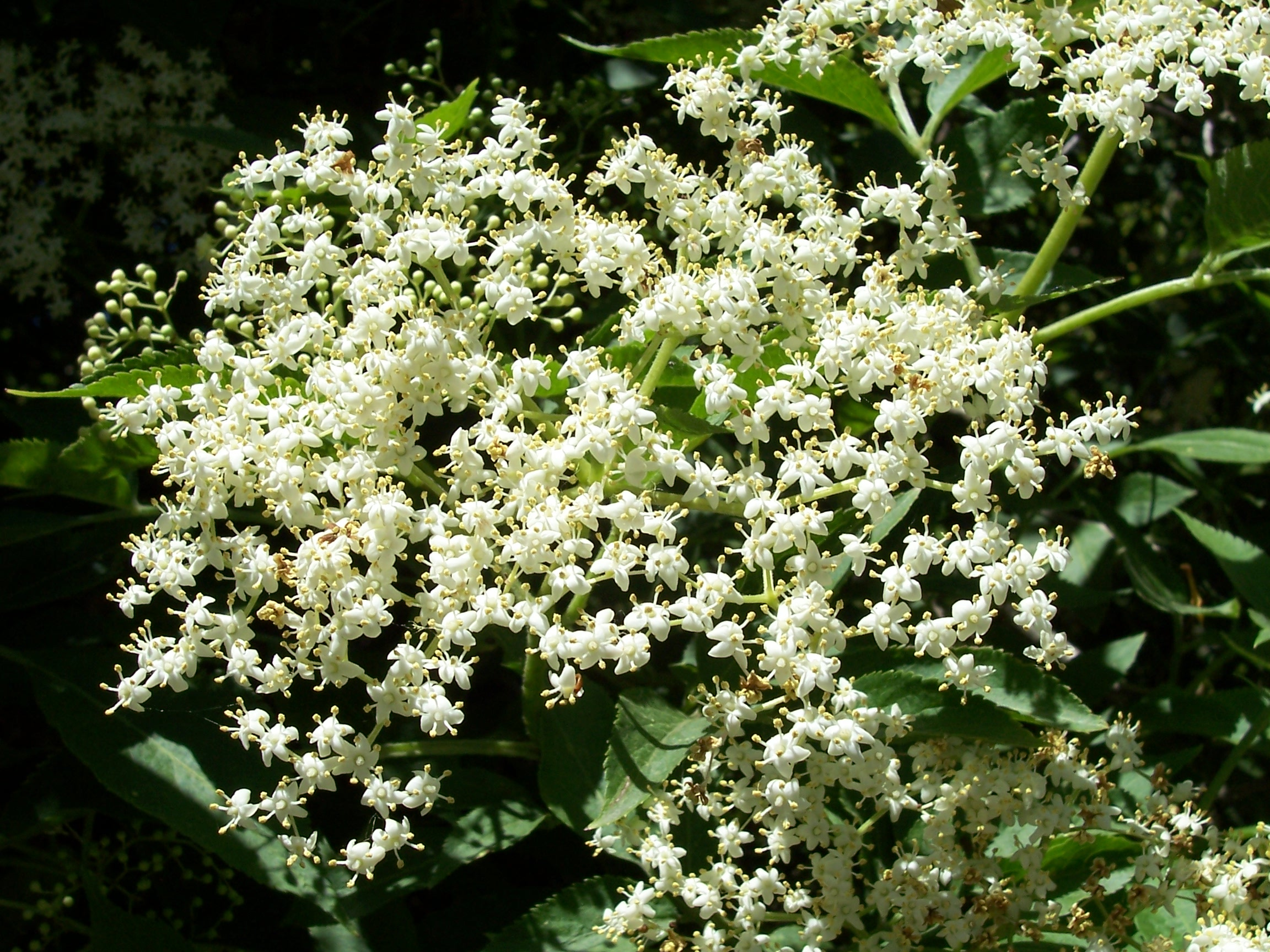
Sambucus nigra or elder
(cymose corymb)
