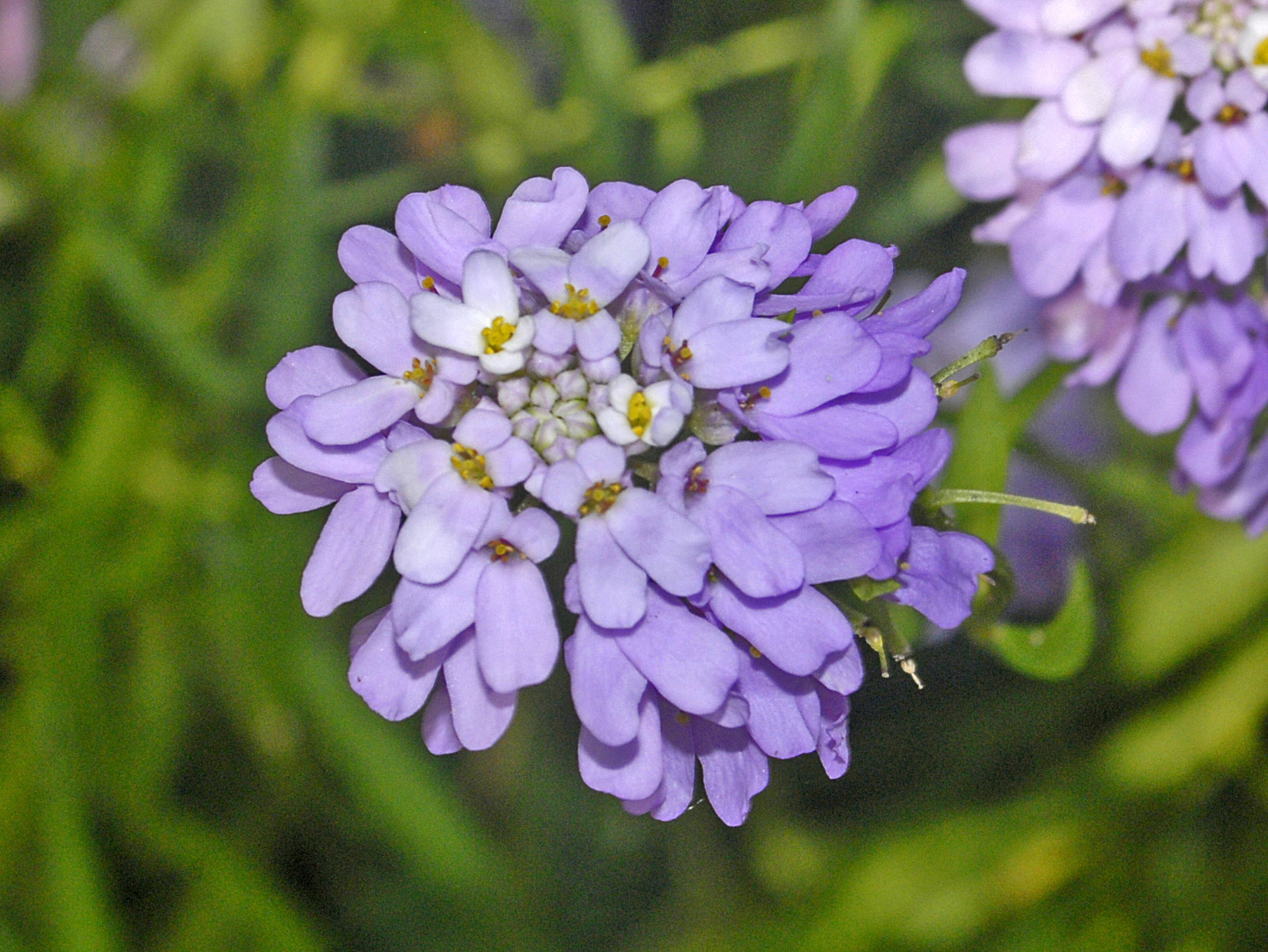
- Flower of Iberis linifolia at the Civico Orto Botanico di Trieste

Scientific classification
- Kingdom: Plantae
- Clade: Tracheophytes
- Clade: Angiosperms
- Clade: Eudicots
- Clade: Rosids
- Order: Brassicales
- Family: Brassicaceae
- Genus: Iberis
- Species: I. linifolia

Binomial name
- Iberis linifolia L.

= Iberis linifolia =

Species of flowering plant

Iberis linifolia is a herbaceous annual flowering plant of the genus Iberis and the family Brassicaceae.

== Synonyms ==
- Biauricula dunalii Bubani
- Biauricula intermedia (Guers.) Lunell
- Biauricula linifolia (L.) Bubani
- Iberis boppardensis Jord.
- Iberis contejeanii Billot
- Iberis dunalii (Bubani) Cadevall & Sallent
- Iberis intermedia Guers.
- Iberis intermedia subsp. beugesiaca J.-M. Tison
- Iberis intermedia subsp. boppardensis (Jord.) Korneck
- Iberis intermedia subsp. dunalii (Bubani) O. Bolòs & Vigo
- Biauricula dunalii Bubani
- Biauricula intermedia (Guers.) Lunell
- Biauricula linifolia (L.) Bubani
- Iberis boppardensis Jord.
- Iberis contejeanii Billot
- Iberis dunalii (Bubani) Cadevall & Sallent
- Iberis intermedia Guers.
- Iberis intermedia subsp. beugesiaca J.-M. Tison
- Iberis intermedia subsp. boppardensis (Jord.) Korneck
- Iberis intermedia subsp. dunalii (Bubani) O. Bolòs & Vigo
- Iberis linifolia subsp. timeroyi (Jord.) Moreno
- Iberis prostii Soy.-Will. ex Godr.
- Iberis soyeri Bonnier & Layens
- Iberis timeroyi Jord.

== Description ==
Iberis linifolia grows to 30–60 centimetres (12–24 in) in height. It has very narrow leaves and pinkish flowers, about 9 mm wide. The flowering period extends from July to September.

== Distribution ==
This species is present in France and Italy.

== Habitat ==
It grows in rocky hillsides and lawns of the Mediterranean, at an altitude of 0–1,800 metres (0–5,906 ft) above sea level
