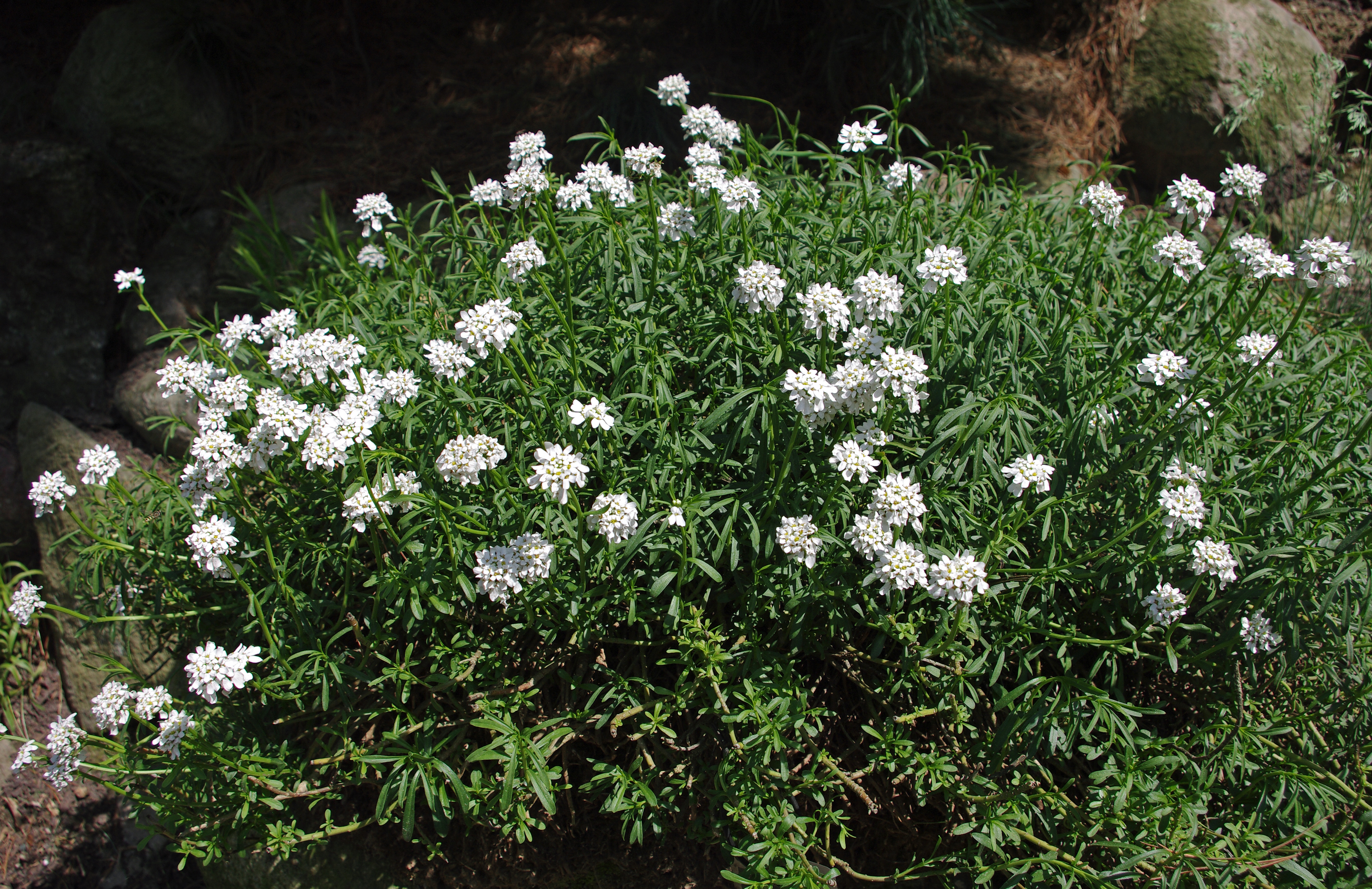
- Perennial candytuft (Iberis sempervirens)

Scientific classification
- Kingdom: Plantae
- Clade: Embryophytes
- Clade: Tracheophytes
- Clade: Angiosperms
- Clade: Eudicots
- Clade: Rosids
- Order: Brassicales
- Family: Brassicaceae
- Genus: Iberis; Dill. ex L.

Species
- ~30; see text

Synonyms
- Biauricula Bubani

= Iberis =

Genus of flowering plants

Iberis (/aɪˈbɪərɪs/ eye-BEER-iss), commonly called candytuft, is a genus of flowering plants belonging to the family Brassicaceae. It comprises annuals, evergreen perennials and subshrubs native to the Old World. Species are native to the Mediterranean basin (southern Europe and North Africa), Western Asia, the Caucasus, and western Europe. The name "candytuft" is not related to candy, but derives from Candia, the former name of Iraklion on the island of Crete.

They are used as ornamental plants for rock gardens, bedding, and borders in full sun or light shade.

In the language of flowers, the candytuft symbolizes indifference.

== Species ==
32 species are accepted.

- Iberis amara L. – rocket candytuft, bitter candytuft, wild candytuft
- Iberis atlantica (Litard. & Maire) Greuter & Burdet
- Iberis attica Jord.
- Iberis aurosica Chaix
- Iberis balansae Jord.
- Iberis bernardiana Gren. & Godr.
- Iberis carica (Bornm.) Prain
- Iberis carnosa Willd.
- Iberis ciliata All.
- Iberis contracta Pers.
- Iberis fontqueri Pau
- Iberis gibraltarica L. – Gibraltar candytuft
- Iberis grosii Pau
- Iberis gypsicola Yıld.
- Iberis halophila Vural & H.Duman
- Iberis intermedia Guers.
- Iberis linifolia L.
- Iberis nazarita Moreno
- Iberis odorata L.
- Iberis pectinata Boiss. & Reut.
- Iberis peyerimhoffii Maire
- Iberis pinnata L.
- Iberis procumbens Lange – dune candytuft
- Iberis runemarkii Greuter & Burdet
- Iberis saxatilis L. – rock candytuft
- Iberis semperflorens L.
- Iberis sempervirens L. – evergreen candytuft, perennial candytuft
- Iberis simplex DC.
- Iberis spathulata DC.
- Iberis spruneri Jord.
- Iberis timeroyi Jord.
- Iberis umbellata L. – globe candytuft

== Trophic connections ==
These plants provide nourishment for a number of insect species of which the rare Euchloe tagis butterfly is the most striking example as it is monophagous on species in this genus.

== Biochemical defenses ==
Species in the genus Iberis contain not only glucosinolates, which are characteristic chemical defenses of the Brassicaceae plant family, but also cucurbitacins, which are better known as chemical defenses in the Cucurbitaceae plant family. Cucurbitacins from Iberis amara have antifeedant activity against the Brassicaceae-feeding specialist Pieris rapae (cabbage butterfly). Cucurbitacins from Iberis umbellata (globe candytuft) are ecdysteroid antagonists, acting on the ecdysteroid receptor of insects.
