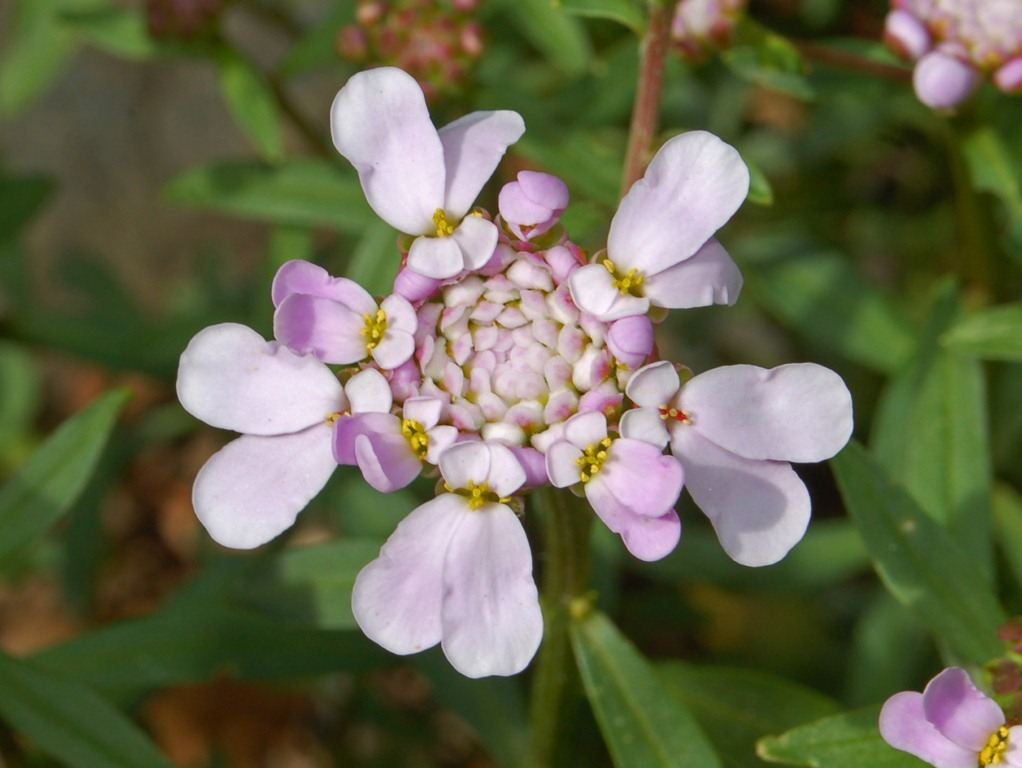
- Flower of Iberis umbellata

Scientific classification
- Kingdom: Plantae
- Clade: Tracheophytes
- Clade: Angiosperms
- Clade: Eudicots
- Clade: Rosids
- Order: Brassicales
- Family: Brassicaceae
- Genus: Iberis
- Species: I. umbellata

Binomial name
- Iberis umbellata L.

= Iberis umbellata =

Species of flowering plant

Iberis umbellata, common name garden candytuft or globe candytuft, is a herbaceous annual flowering plant of the genus Iberis and the family Brassicaceae.

== Etymology ==
The genus name derives from "Iberia", the ancient name of Spain, while the species epithet comes from the Latin "umbel", meaning "umbrella" and refers to the shape of the inflorescence.

== Description ==
The biological form of Iberis umbellata is hemicryptophyte scapose, as its overwintering buds are situated just below the soil surface and the floral axis is more or less erect with a few leaves.

The stem is twisted at the base while the flowering branches are erect and leafy. This plant reaches a height of 30–50 centimetres (12–20 in). The leaves are green and linear-lanceolate, 15–25 millimetres (0.59–0.98 in) long. The flowers are in umbel-shaped corymbs. The calyx is violet and the corolla is composed of four white, pink or purple petals. The petals are rounded at the apex, with the peripheral ones forming a large vexillum 8–10 millimetres (0.31–0.39 in) long. The flowering period extends from May through June. The flowers are hermaphroditic and pollinated by bees and butterflies. The fruit is a silique 7–10 millimetres (0.28–0.39 in) long.

== Distribution ==
This species is native to the Mediterranean region. It is present in most of Europe, especially along the coasts, from Spain to Greece and in northern America.

== Habitat ==
It grows in dry rocky hillsides, in bushy areas and in clearings, preferably on calcareous soils, at an altitude of 0–1,300 metres (0–4,265 ft) above sea level.

== Gallery ==
Plants of Iberis-umbellata

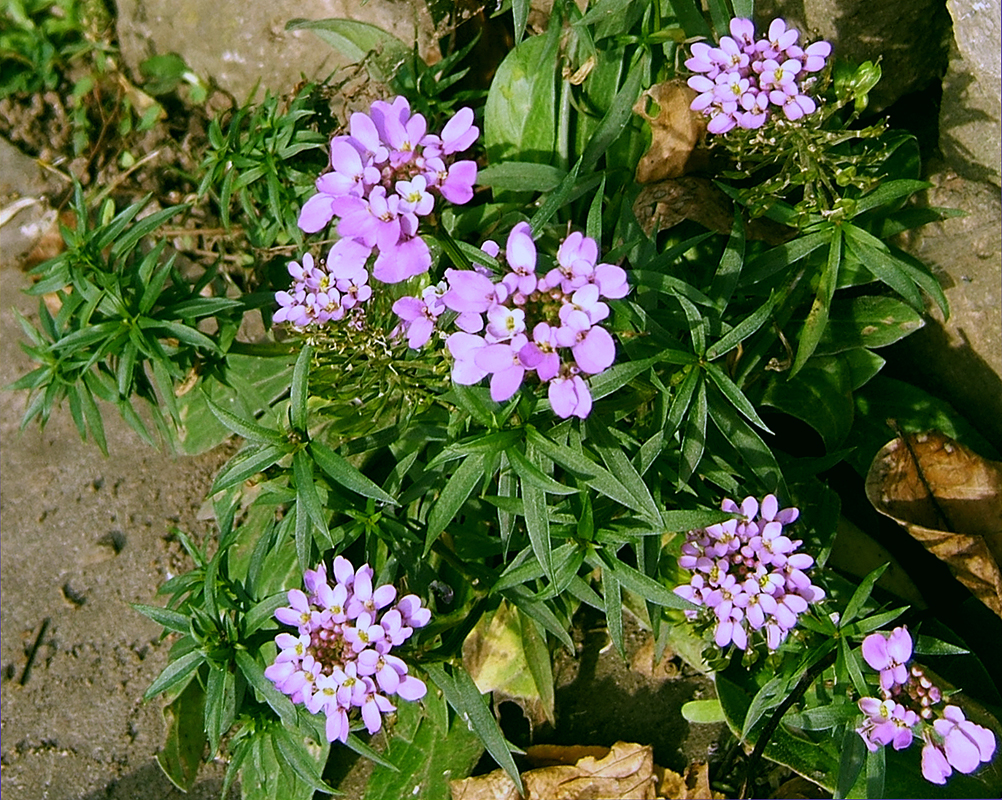
Plant of Iberis-umbellata

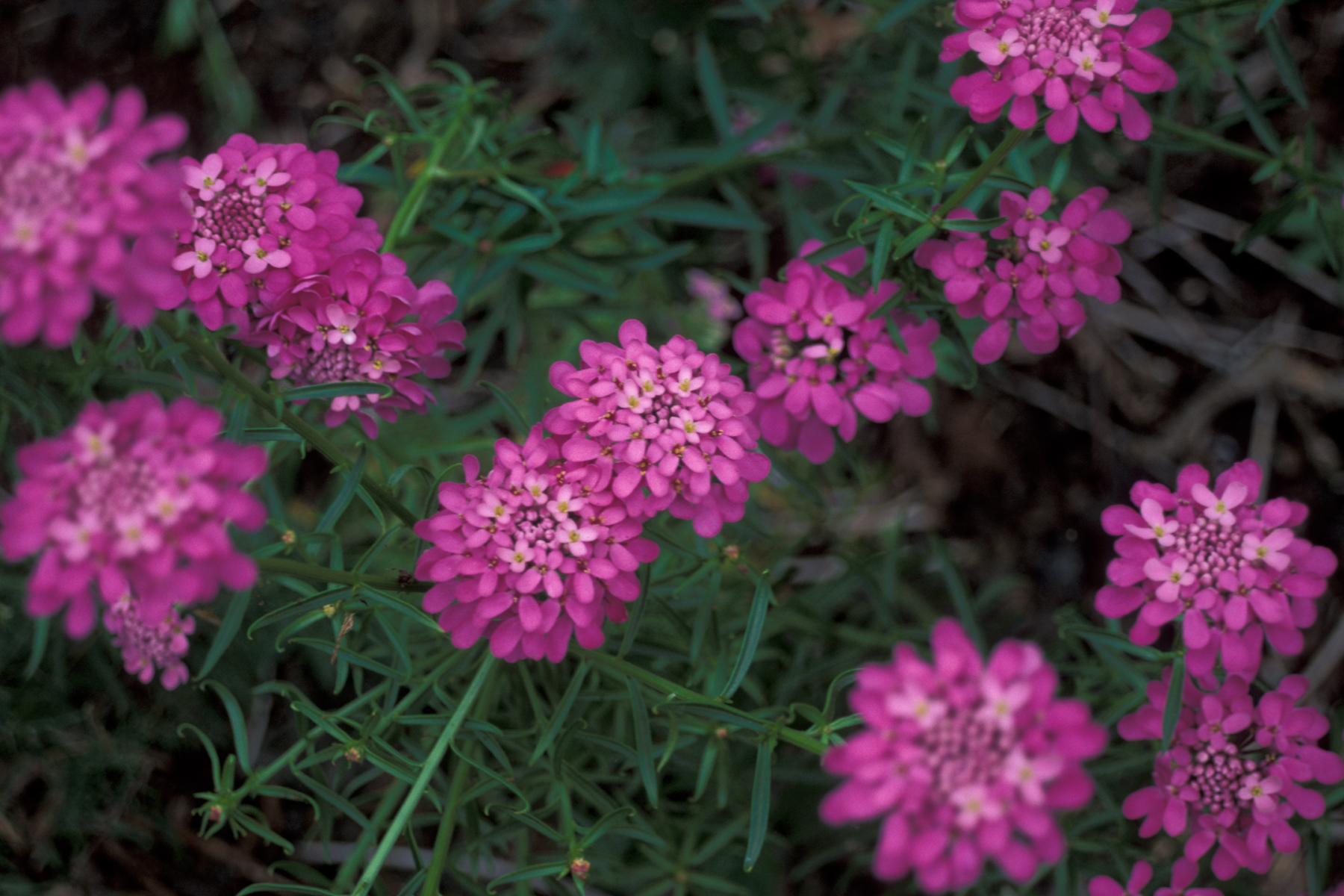
Flowers of Iberis-umbellata

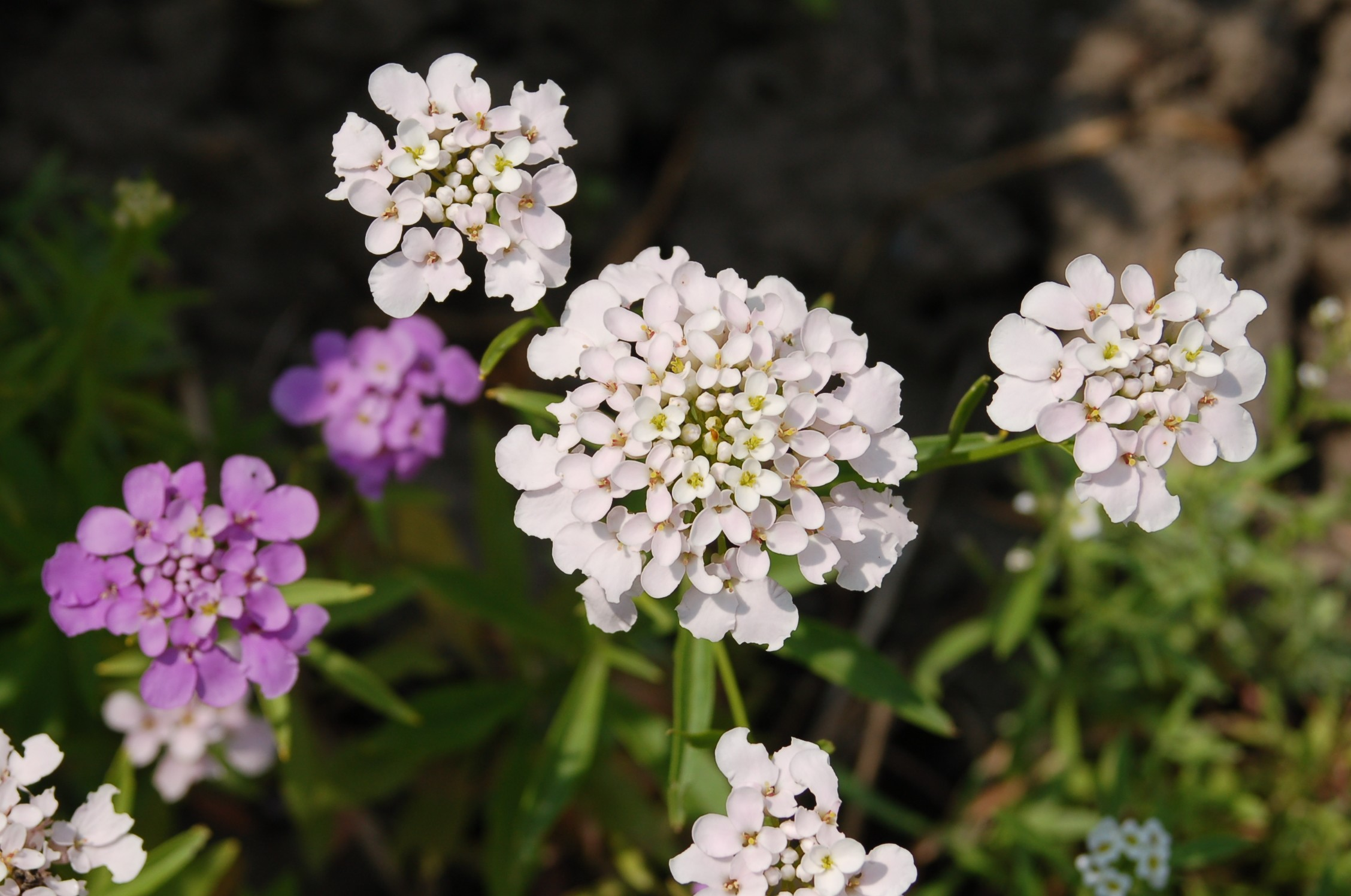
Flower of Iberis-umbellata

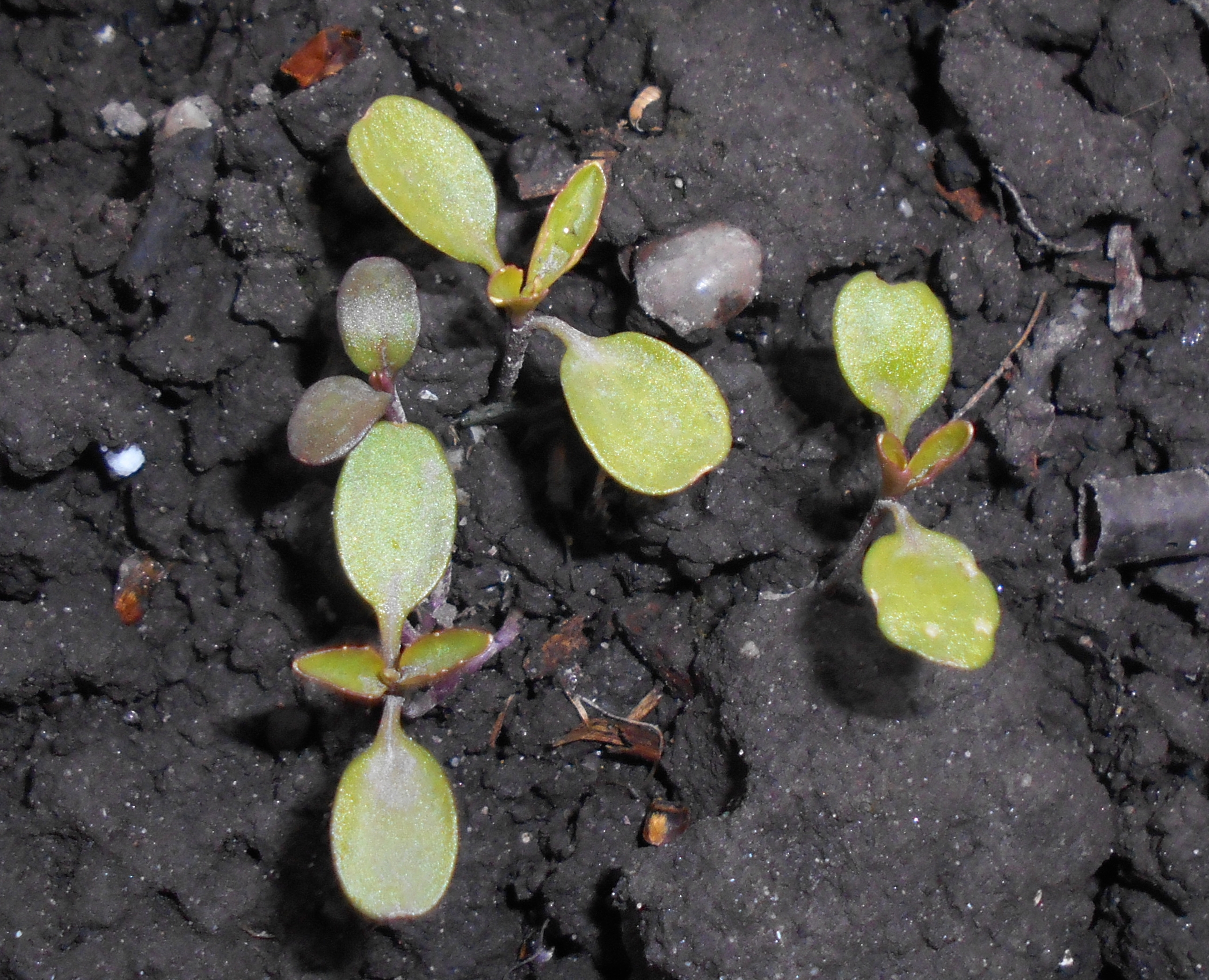
Seedlings.
