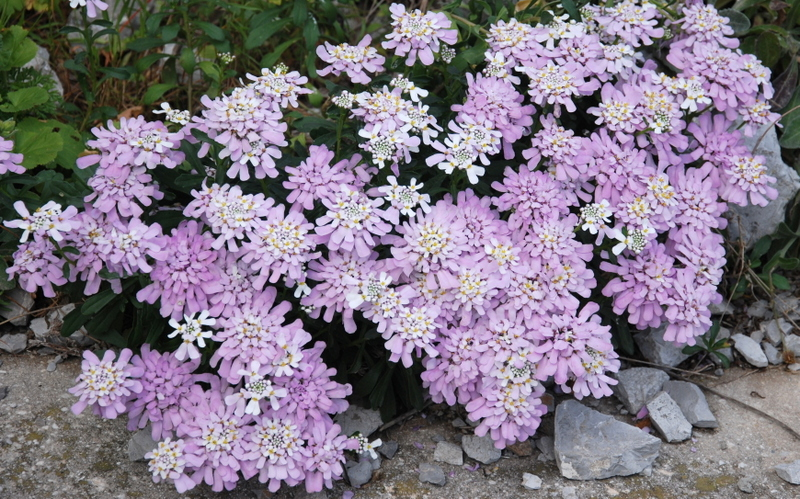
- Iberis gibraltarica flowering at the Gibraltar Botanic Gardens.

Scientific classification
- Kingdom: Plantae
- Clade: Tracheophytes
- Clade: Angiosperms
- Clade: Eudicots
- Clade: Rosids
- Order: Brassicales
- Family: Brassicaceae
- Genus: Iberis
- Species: I. gibraltarica

Binomial name
- Iberis gibraltarica L.

= Iberis gibraltarica =

Species of flowering plant

Iberis gibraltarica, the Gibraltar candytuft, is a flowering plant of the genus Iberis and the family Brassicaceae. It is the symbol of the Upper Rock Nature Reserve in Gibraltar, but is a native of North Africa. Gibraltar is the only place in Europe where it is found growing in the wild. The candytuft grows from crevices in the limestone, and is often seen growing in abundance from the north face of the Rock of Gibraltar. Its flowers range from pale violet to almost white, and can reach up to 8 cm (3.1 in) across.

This species of candytuft is the national flower of Gibraltar, where it appeared on the local 50 pence coin between 1988 and 1989.

== Gallery ==
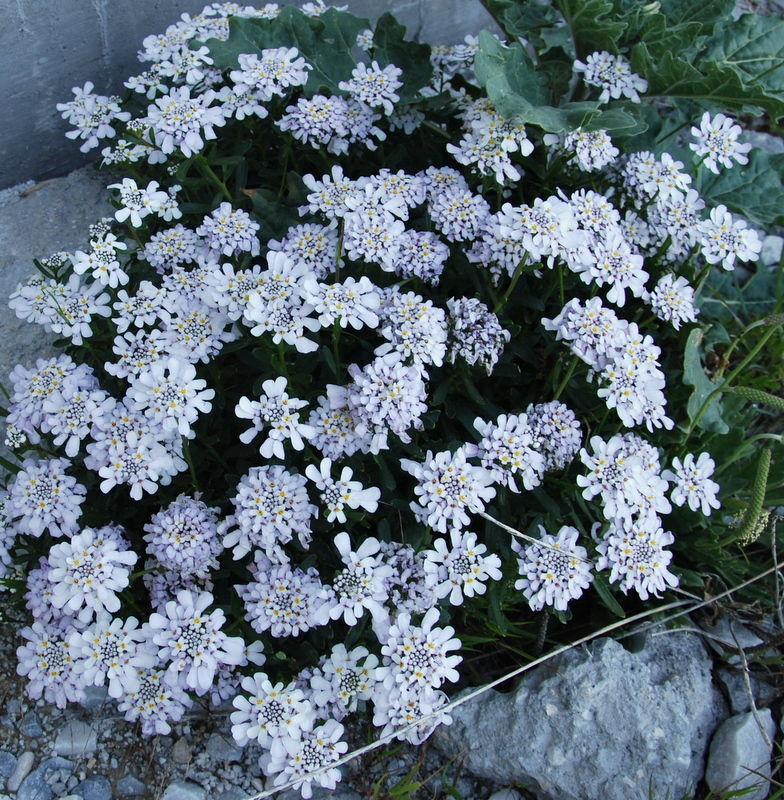

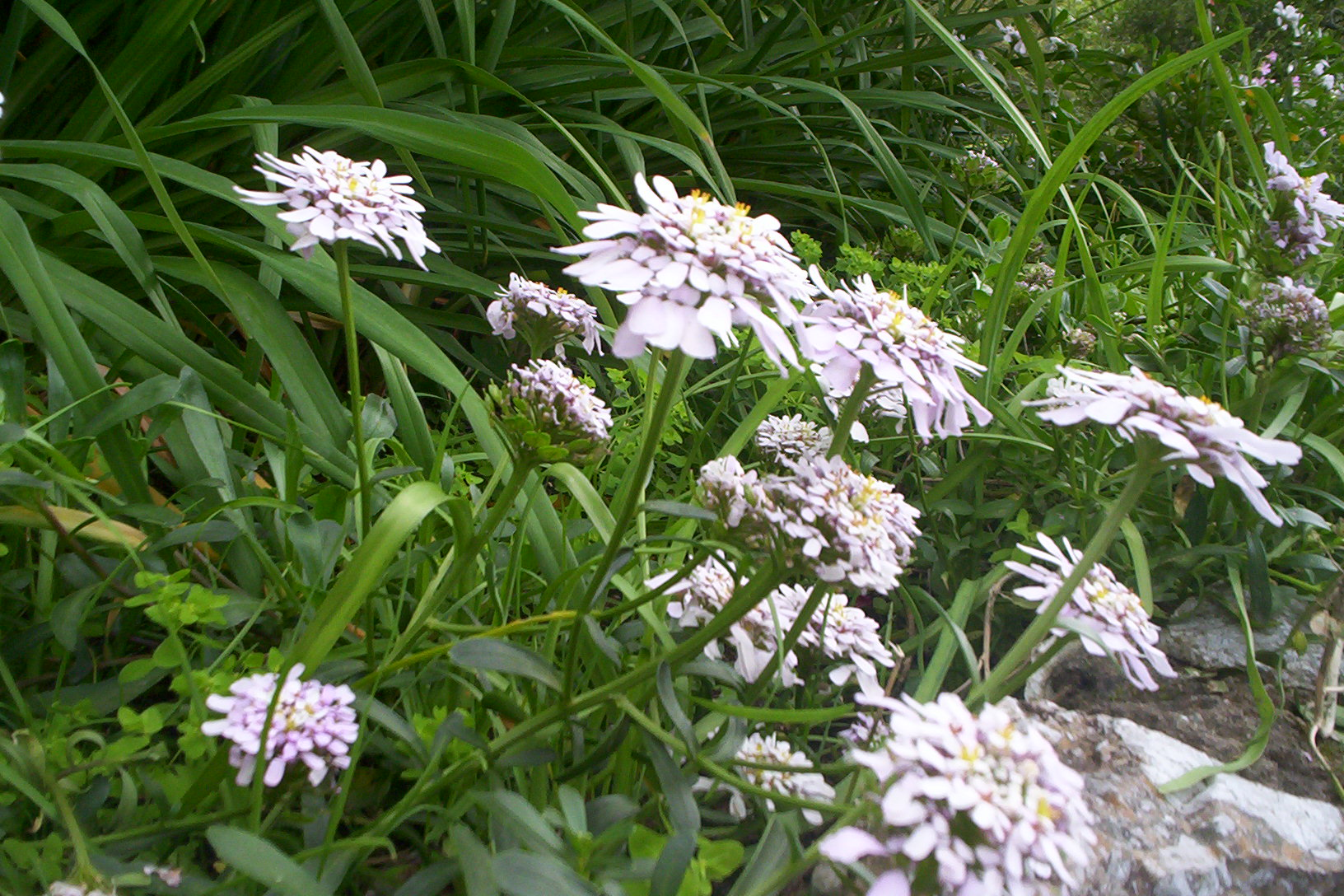
