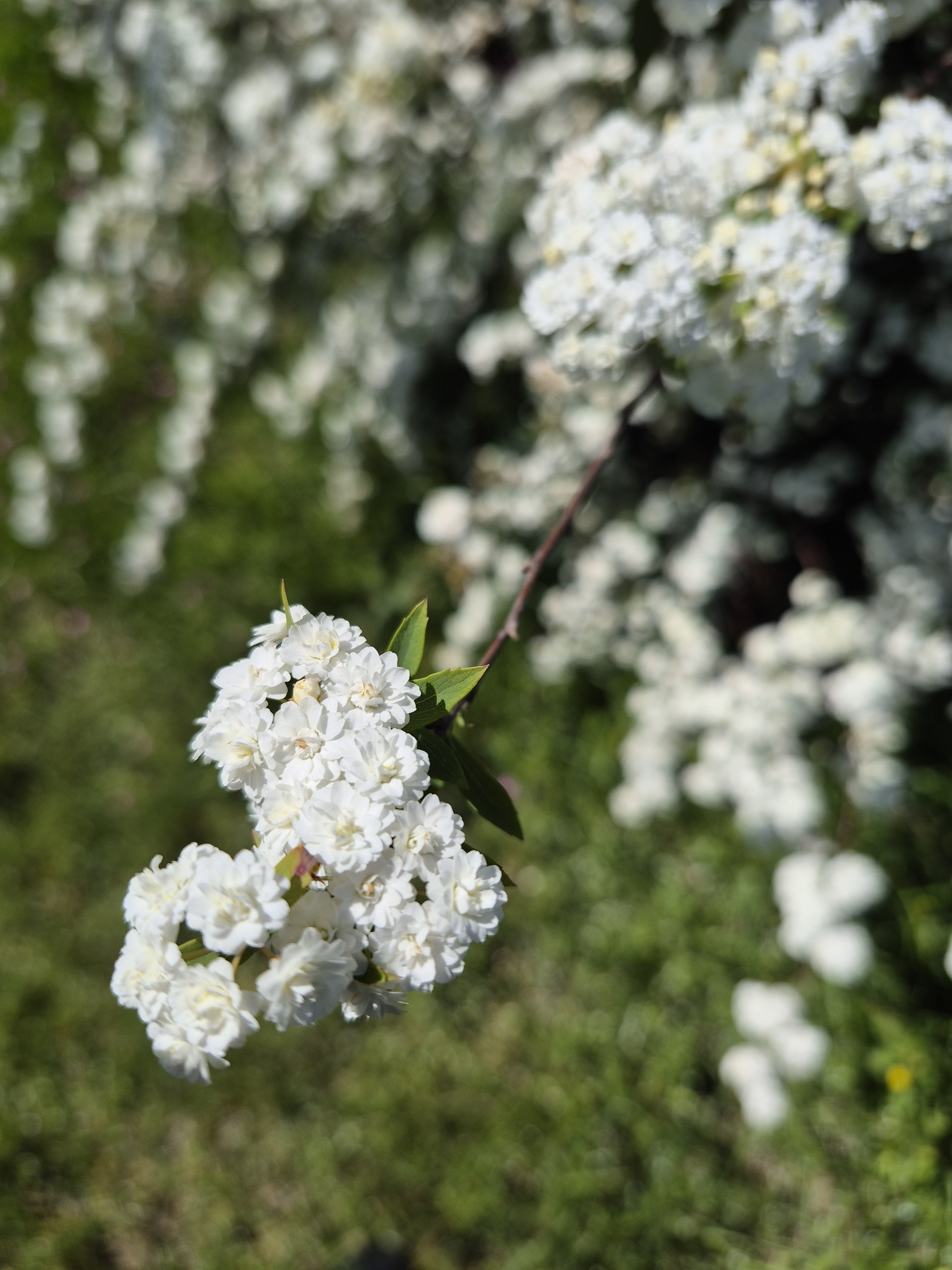

Conservation status
- Least Concern (IUCN 3.1)

Scientific classification
- Kingdom: Plantae
- Clade: Tracheophytes
- Clade: Angiosperms
- Clade: Eudicots
- Clade: Rosids
- Order: Rosales
- Family: Rosaceae
- Genus: Spiraea
- Species: S. cantoniensis

Binomial name
- Spiraea cantoniensis Lour.

Synonyms
- Spiraea jiangxiensis Z.X.Yu; Spiraea lanceolata Comm. ex Poir.; Spiraea neumannii hort. ex Zabel; Spiraea reevesiana Lindl.

= Spiraea cantoniensis =

Species of flowering plant

Spiraea cantoniensis is a species of flowering plant in the rose family, Rosaceae. It is sometimes referred to by the common names Reeve's spiraea, bridalwreath spirea, double white may, Cape may or may bush. It is an ornamental plant featured in gardens, it is a shrub growing up to 1.5 metres (4.9 ft) tall with frothy, pompom-like clusters of snow-white flowers borne along arching branches that bloom in May in its native country, hence its common name.

== Description ==
It is a deciduous or semi-evergreen shrub that reaches a size of 1–2 m height, with many thin branches, arched, flexible and glabrous. The leaves are alternate, simple, small petiolate, with 2–6 cm long green lanceolate, elliptical-rhomboidal or slightly obovate lamina, with 3 nerves parallel from its base, irregularly crenate-dentate in its distal half. The leaves may turn a yellowish red colour in autumn. Blooming in spring and snow white in colour, its flowers are hermaphroditic, actinomorphic, of ± 1 cm diameter, arranged in axillary corimbos, each with 5 free sepals, 5 white petals, numerous stamens shorter than the petals. The fruit is a poly-follicle, with 3-5 plurisemined carpidia (follicles).

== Cultivation ==
It is used as a screening or bordering plant alongside a fence line or as a conspicuous feature plant. May bushes prefer a full sun to partly shaded position with well drained soil, forgiving both light frost, wind, heat, poor soils and drought. It is generally best grown in cooler climates with protection from the hot afternoon sun which can cause leaf burn. Furthermore, the plant should be mulched and well-watered. Trimming and fertilisation may be need after flowering to keep a wedged growth habit and boost productive flowering in the next season.

== Distribution ==
It is native to Southeast China, and is found as an introduced species in Assam, the Azores, South Brazil, Bulgaria, South-Central China, Chita Oblast, Guatemala, Japan, Korea, Nepal, North and South New Zealand, Pakistan, Portugal, Spain, Trinidad-Tobago, and The United States (Alabama, Arkansas, Louisiana, New York, North Carolina, Ohio, and Virginia).

== Gallery ==
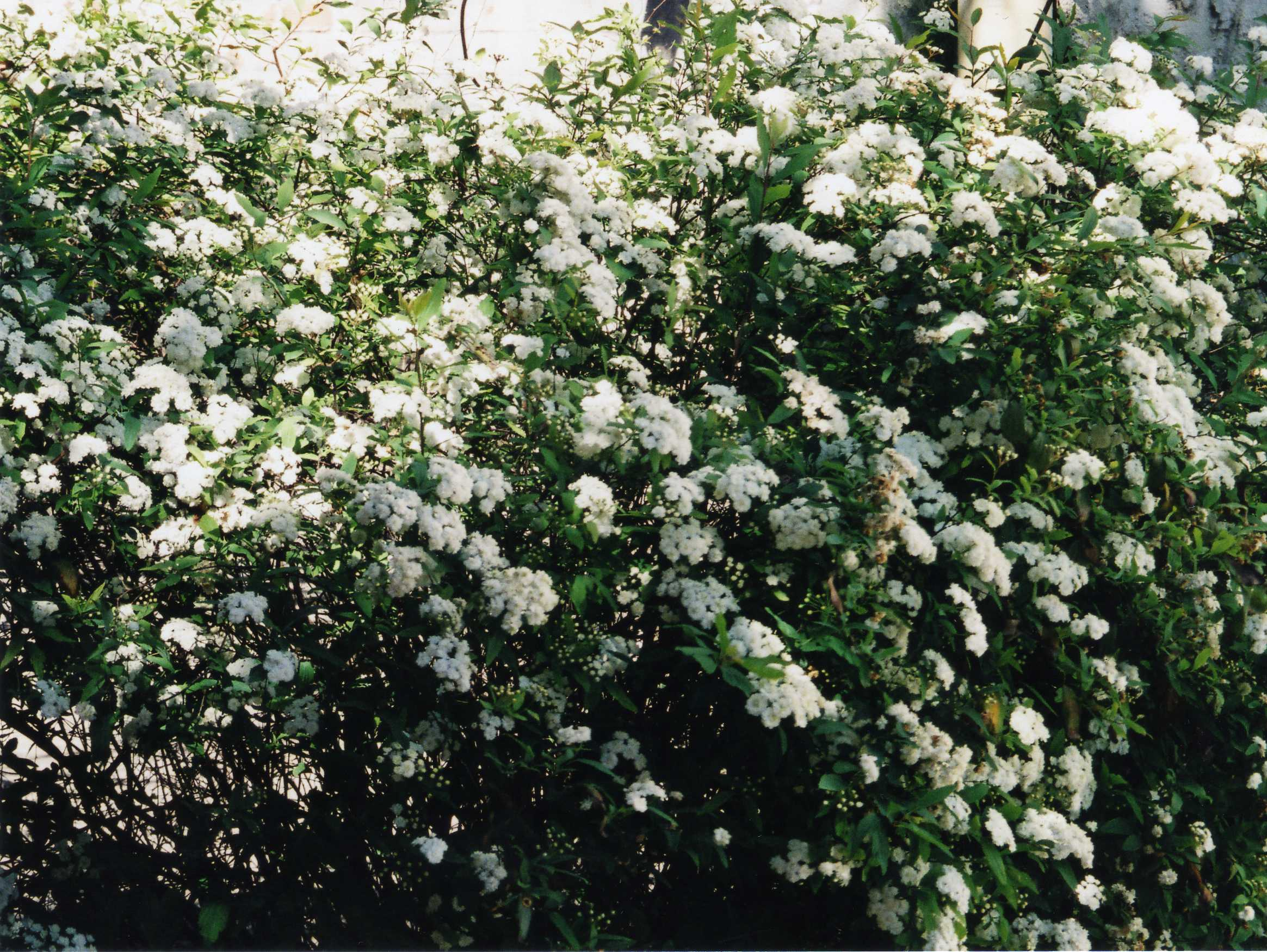

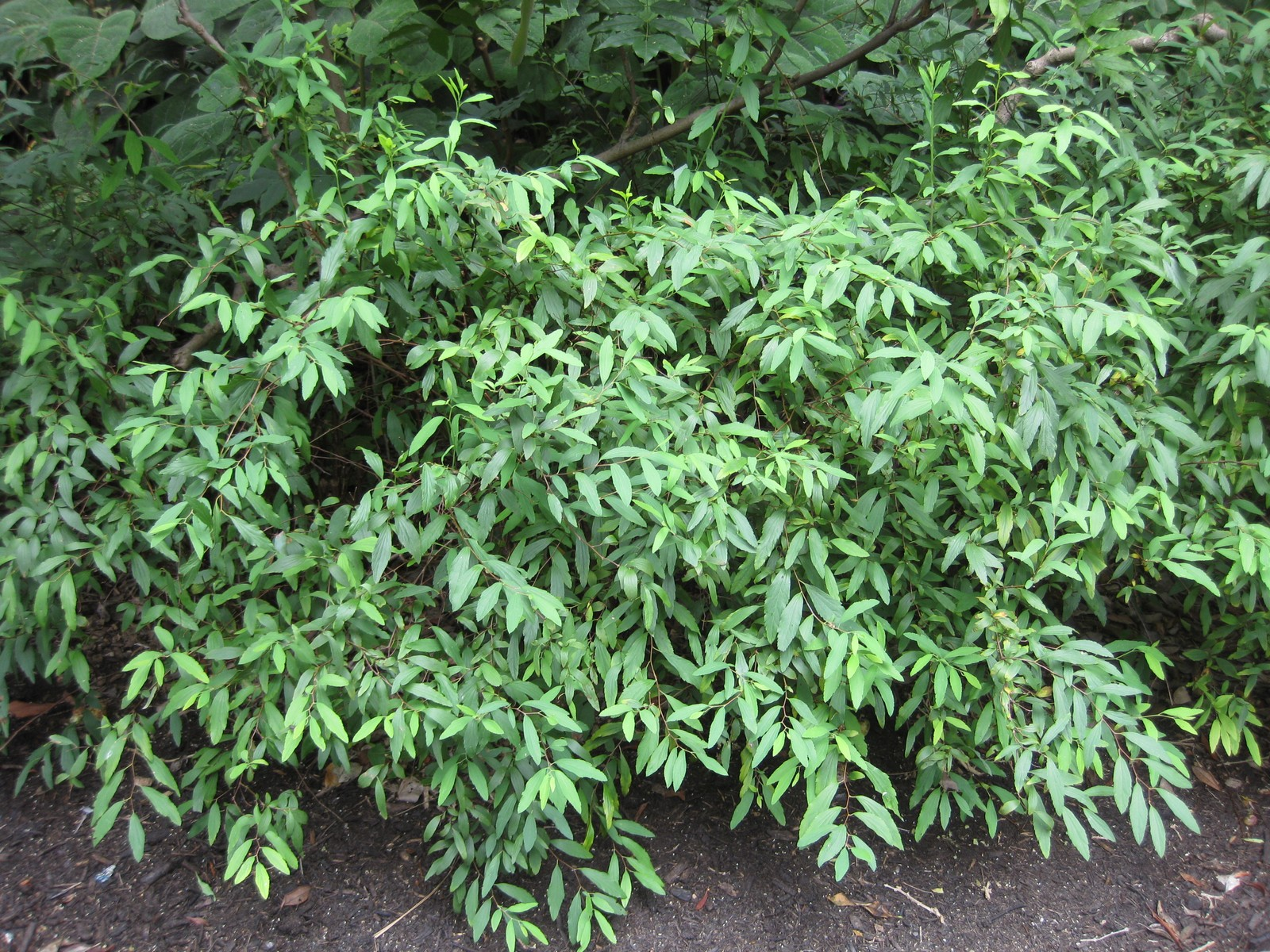

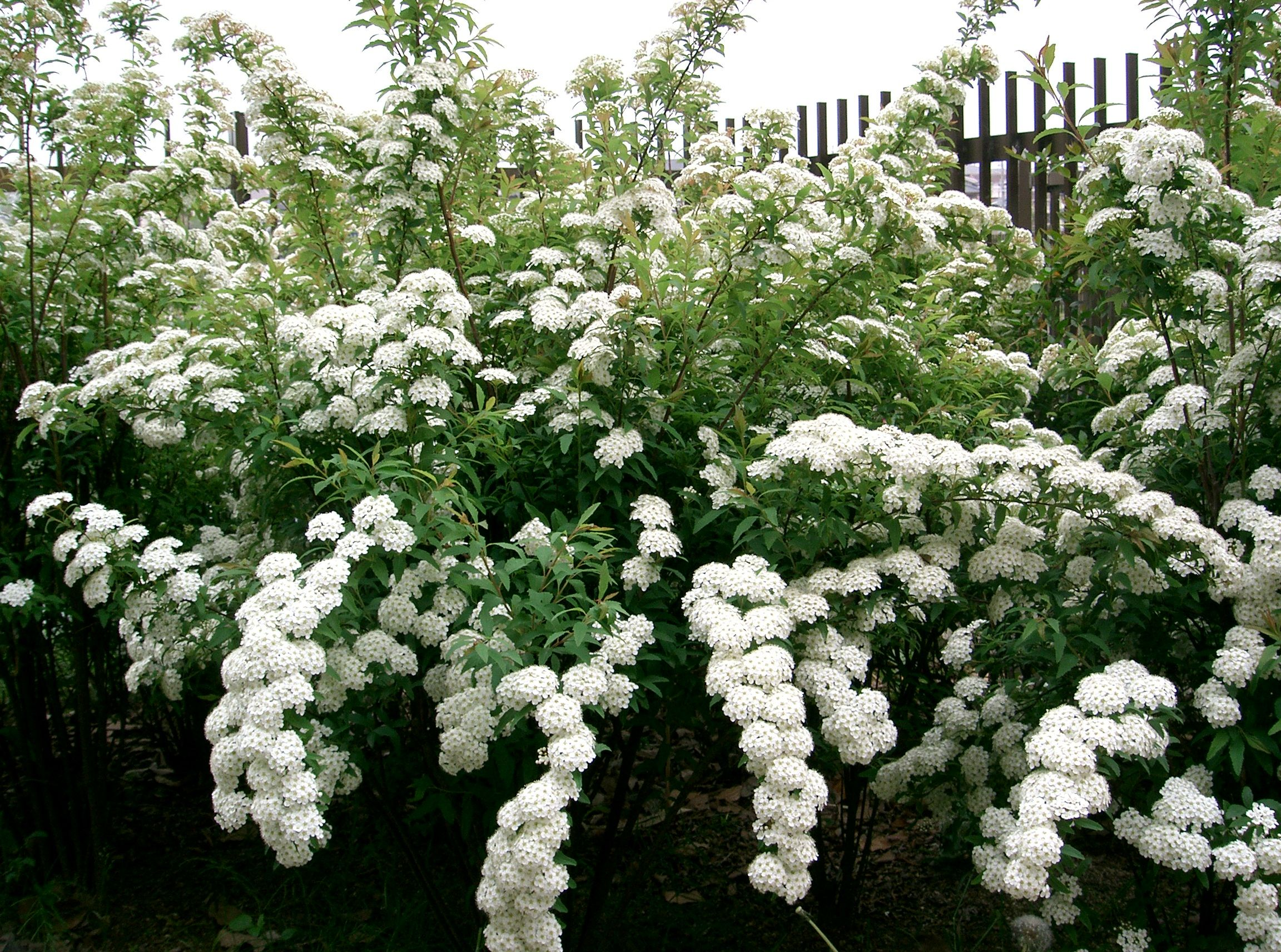

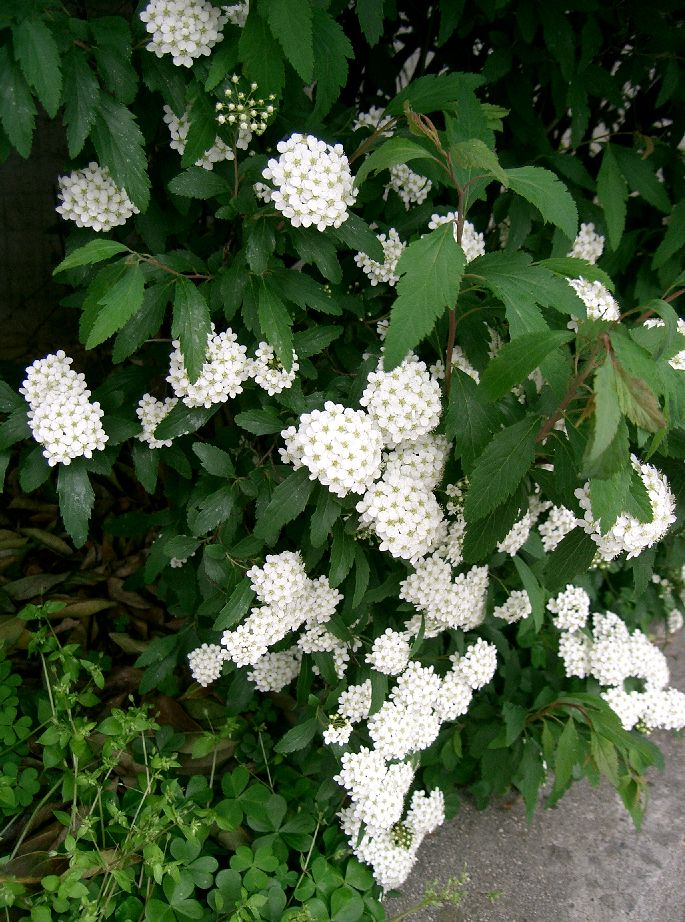

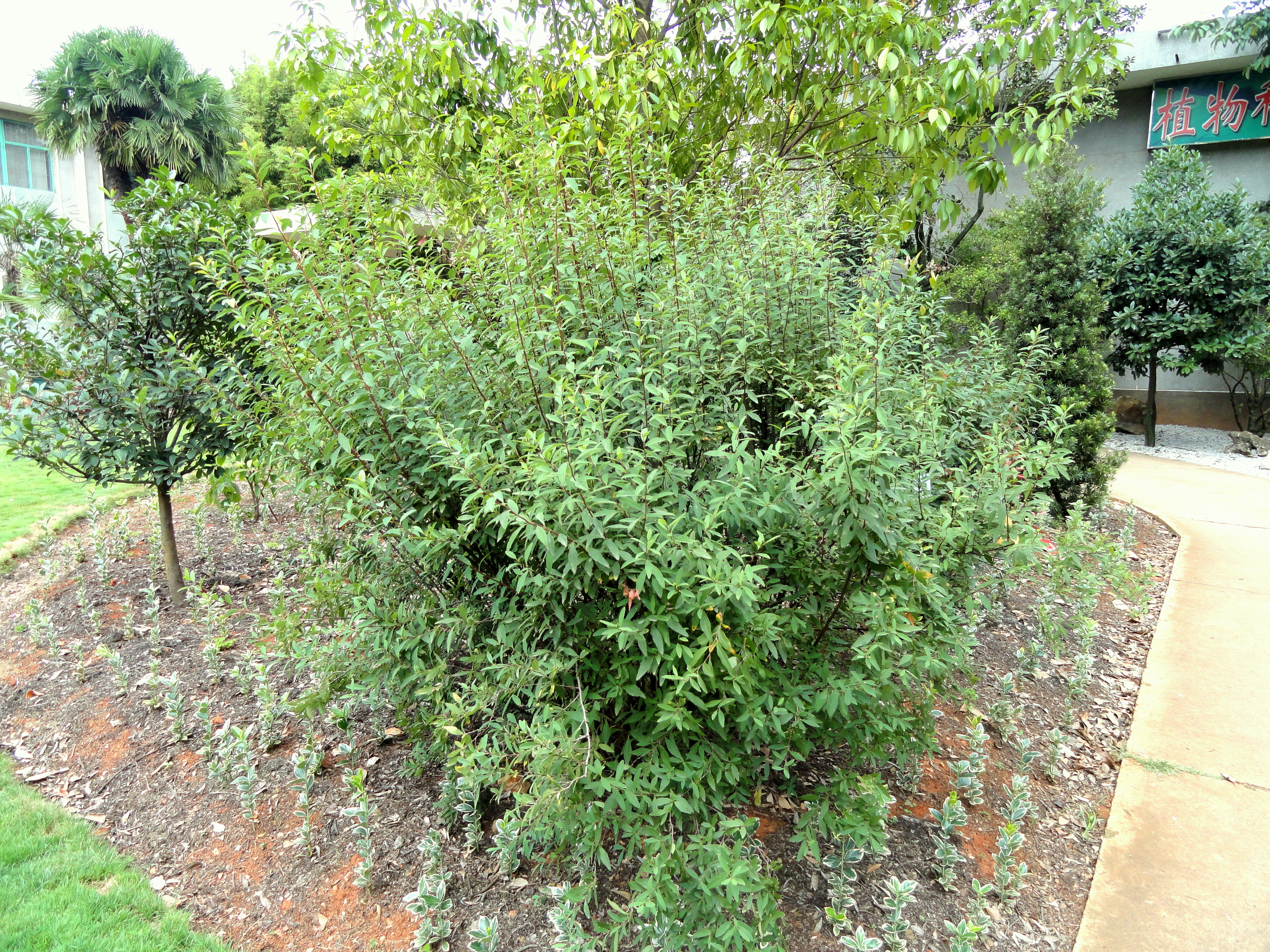

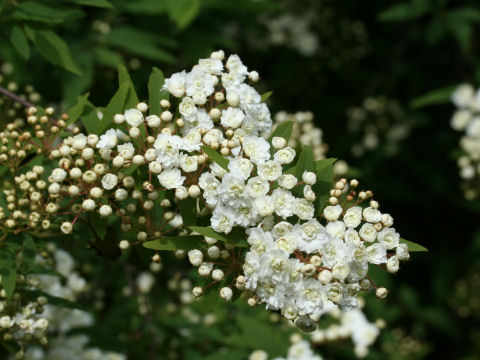

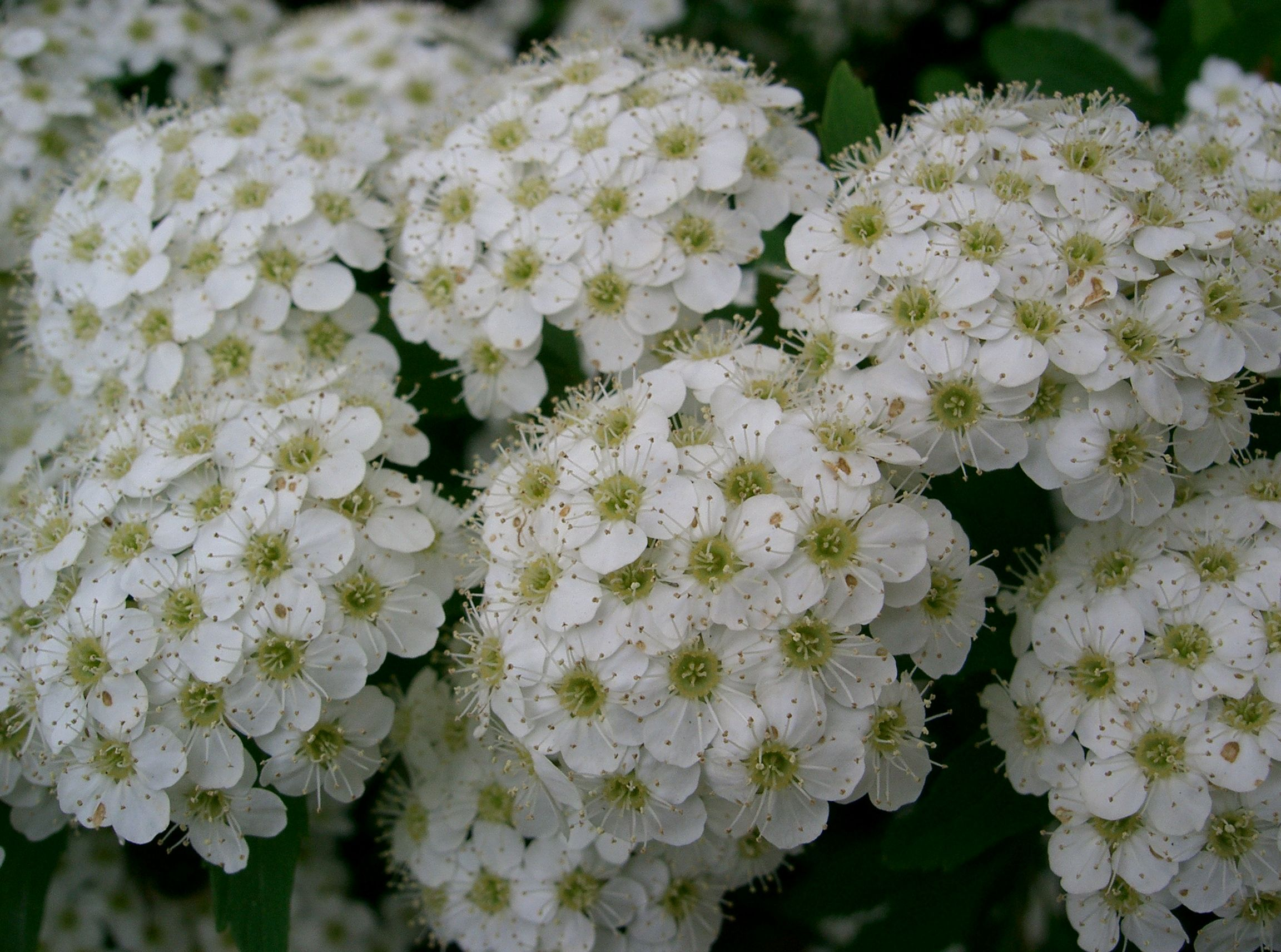

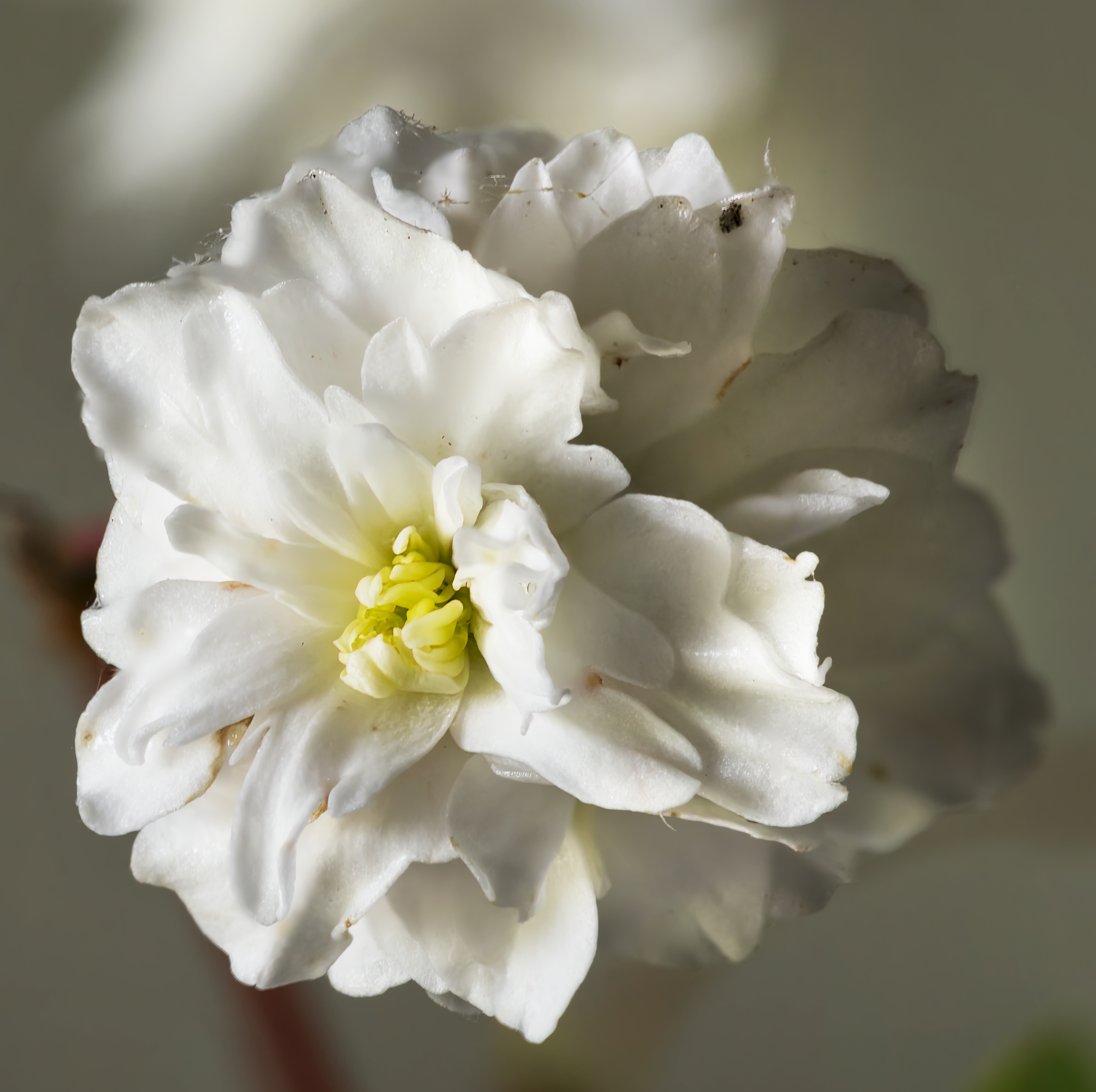
Spiraea cantoniensis f plena

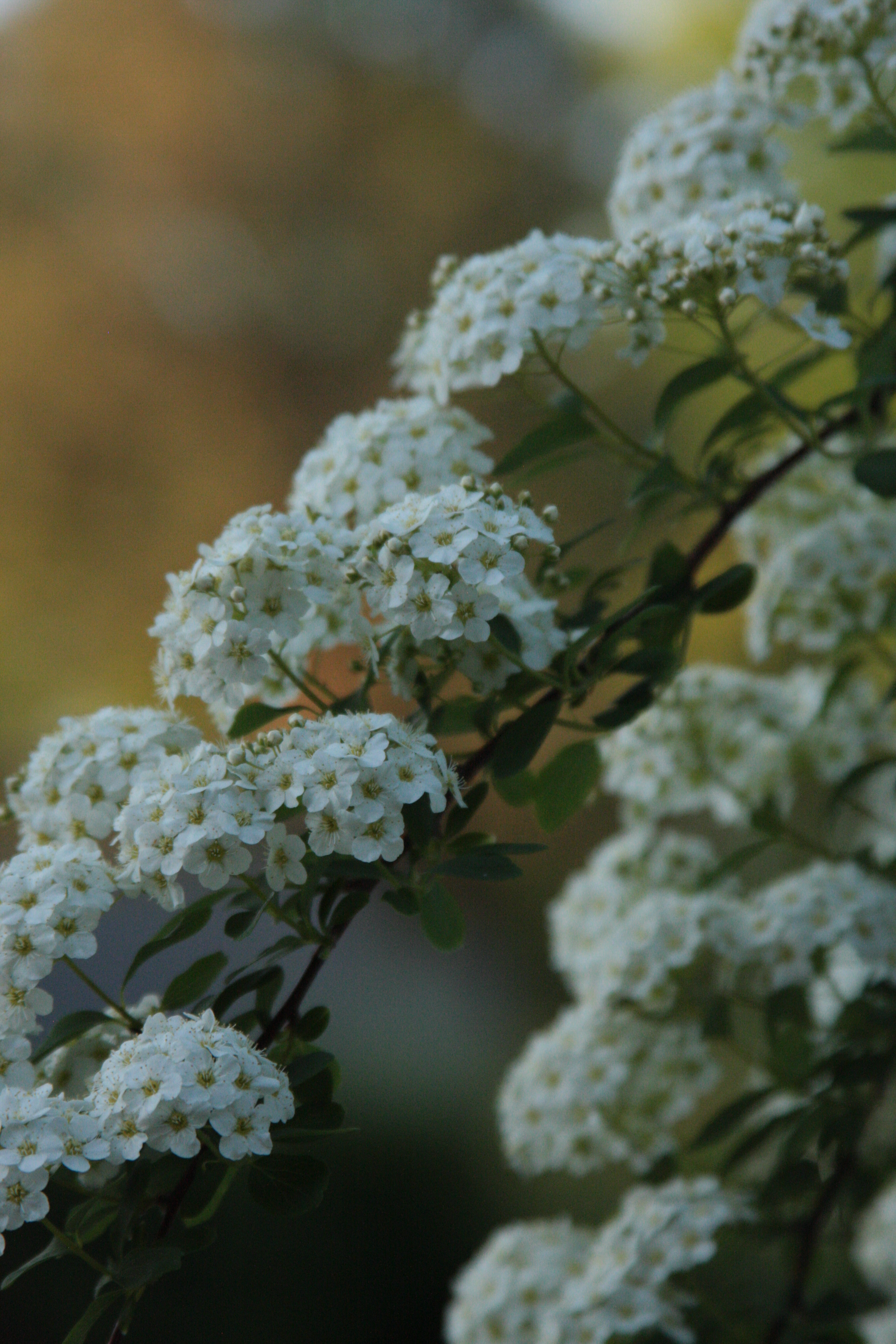

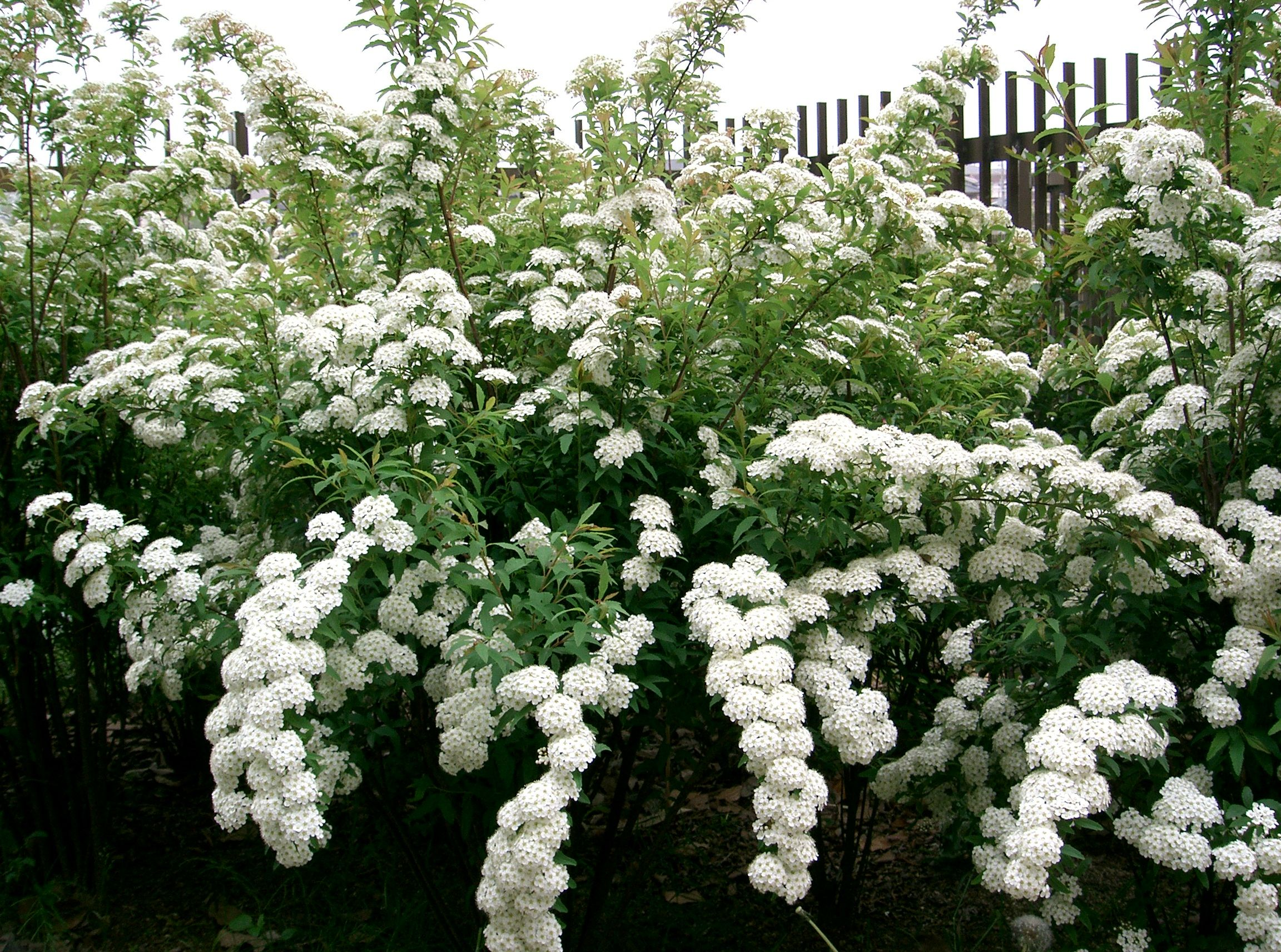
