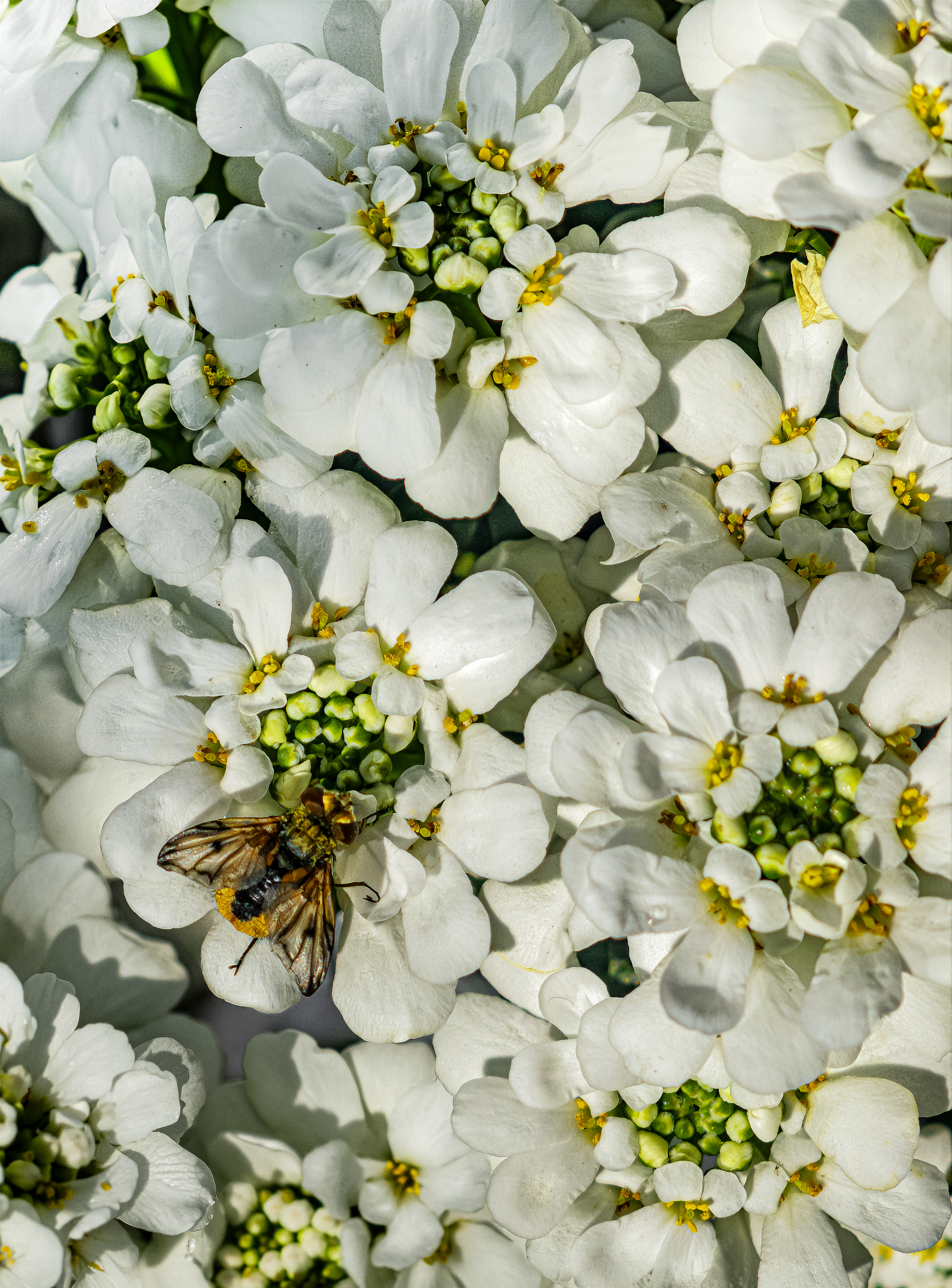

Scientific classification
- Kingdom: Plantae
- Clade: Tracheophytes
- Clade: Angiosperms
- Clade: Eudicots
- Clade: Rosids
- Order: Brassicales
- Family: Brassicaceae
- Genus: Iberis
- Species: I. sempervirens

Binomial name
- Iberis sempervirens L.

= Iberis sempervirens =

Species of flowering plant

Iberis sempervirens, the evergreen candytuft or perennial candytuft, is a species of flowering plant in the family Brassicaceae, native to southern Europe. The species is often used as an ornamental garden shrub because of its decorative flowers. Iberis is so named because many members of the genus come from the Iberian Peninsula in south west Europe. Sempervirens means "always green", referring to the evergreen foliage.

== Range ==
The natural range is in Europe in Spain, France, Italy, Romania and the Balkan Peninsula. In Africa, it is found in Morocco and Algeria. In Asia, it is present in Syria and Turkey. It is naturalised in the British Isles, in Assam, and in North America. It grows in steppes and dry forests on moderately dry to fresh, slightly acidic to alkaline, sandy-loamy to loamy, nutrient-rich soils in sunny to light shady locations. The species is heat loving and frost hardy.

== Description ==
It is a spreading subshrub growing to 30 cm (12 in) high by 40 cm (16 in) broad. As an ornamental plant it is a spring-blooming favourite, often seen cascading over rocks and walls, or used as groundcover. The glossy, evergreen foliage forms a billowing mound, with many fragrant, pure white flowers in tight clusters for several weeks during spring and early summer. The leaf blade of the leaves is leathery, 25–75 mm or 1–3 in (and rarely 125 mm or 5 in) long, 2 to 5 millimetres wide, oblong spatulate to lanceolate, obtuse with a pointed base. The fruits are roundish to broad ovate, 6 to 8 millimetres long and 5 to 6 millimetres wide. The seeds are narrowly winged and 2 to 3 millimetres long.

== Cultivation ==
When grown in a garden it may require light pruning right after blooming, but otherwise plants can be left alone in fall and early spring. It is drought-tolerant once established. It prefers a well-drained site, so heavy clay soils that stay wet in winter should be avoided. It is not easily divided. Iberis sempervirens survives in USDA hardiness zones 3–9 with mean annual minimum temperatures of −23 to −21 °C (−10 to −5 °F).

It is hardy in most parts of the UK, surviving temperatures down to −15 °C (5 °F). Vernalization (a period of cold weather) is required for flower initiation. At least 8–10 weeks are needed at an average temperature of 5 °C (40 °F).

The cultivar 'Snowflake' has gained the Royal Horticultural Society's Award of Garden Merit.

== Gallery ==
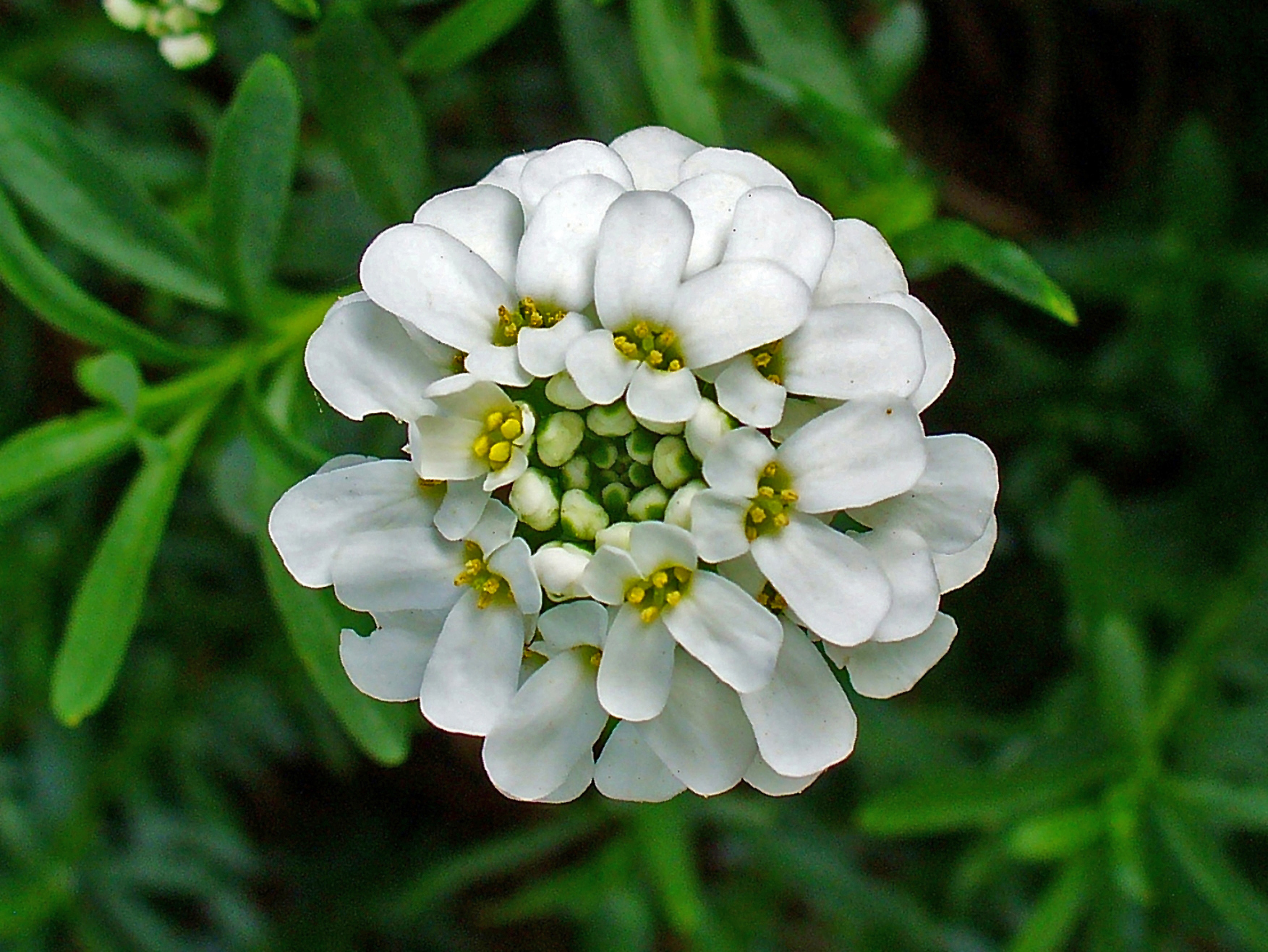
Flower closeup

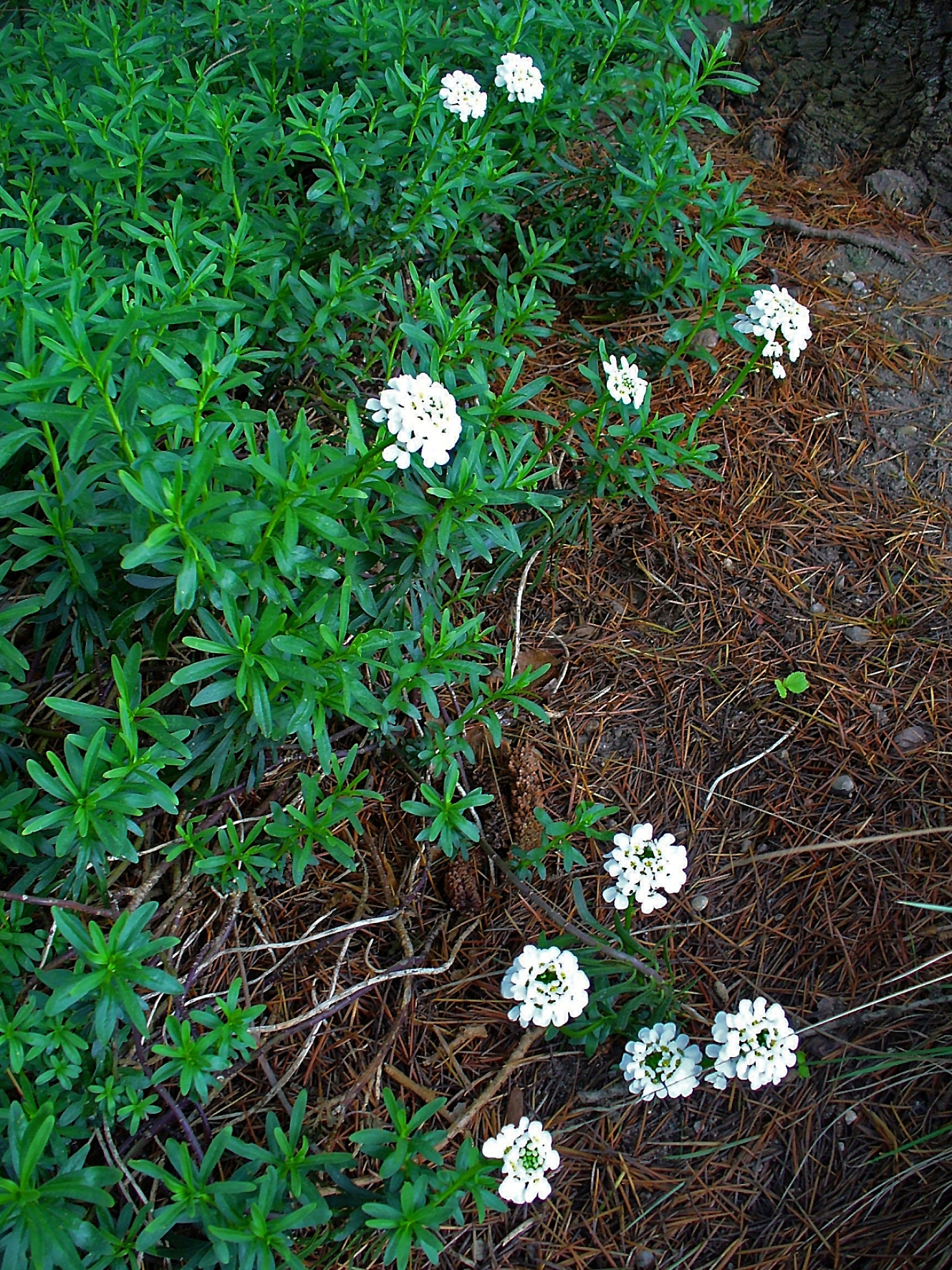
Natural habitat

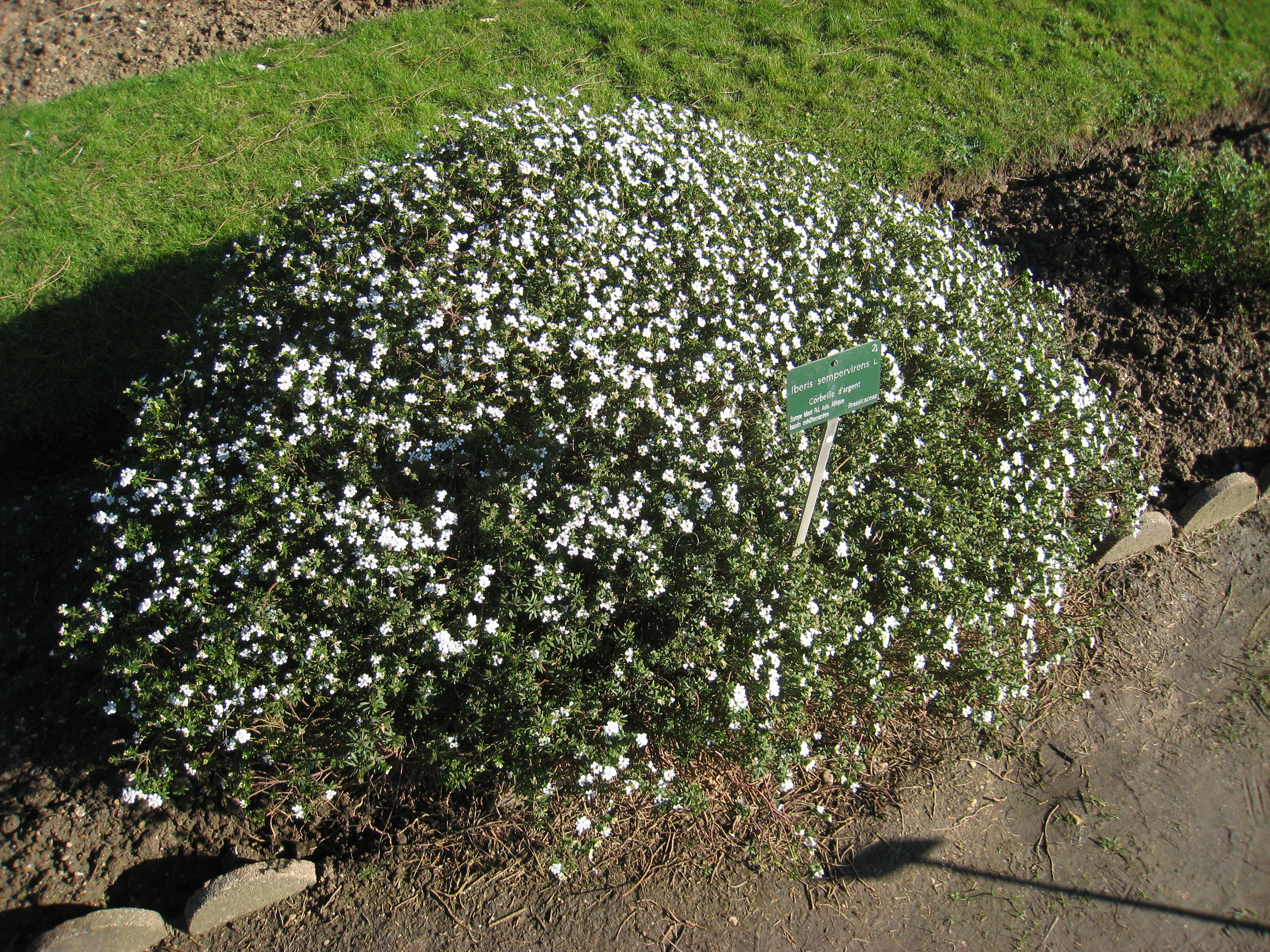
Shrubby appearance

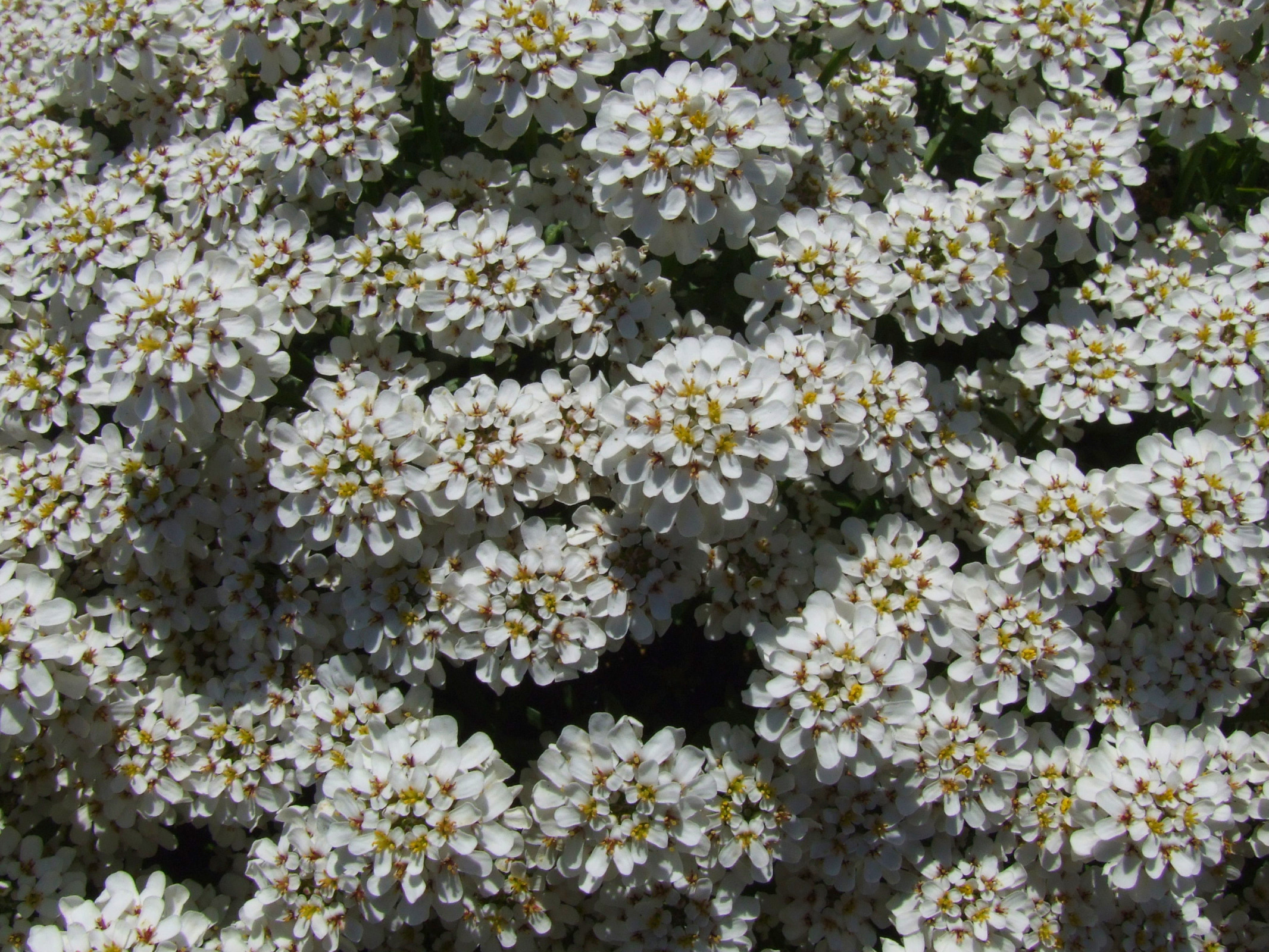
White flower clusters
