= Flora of Saskatchewan =

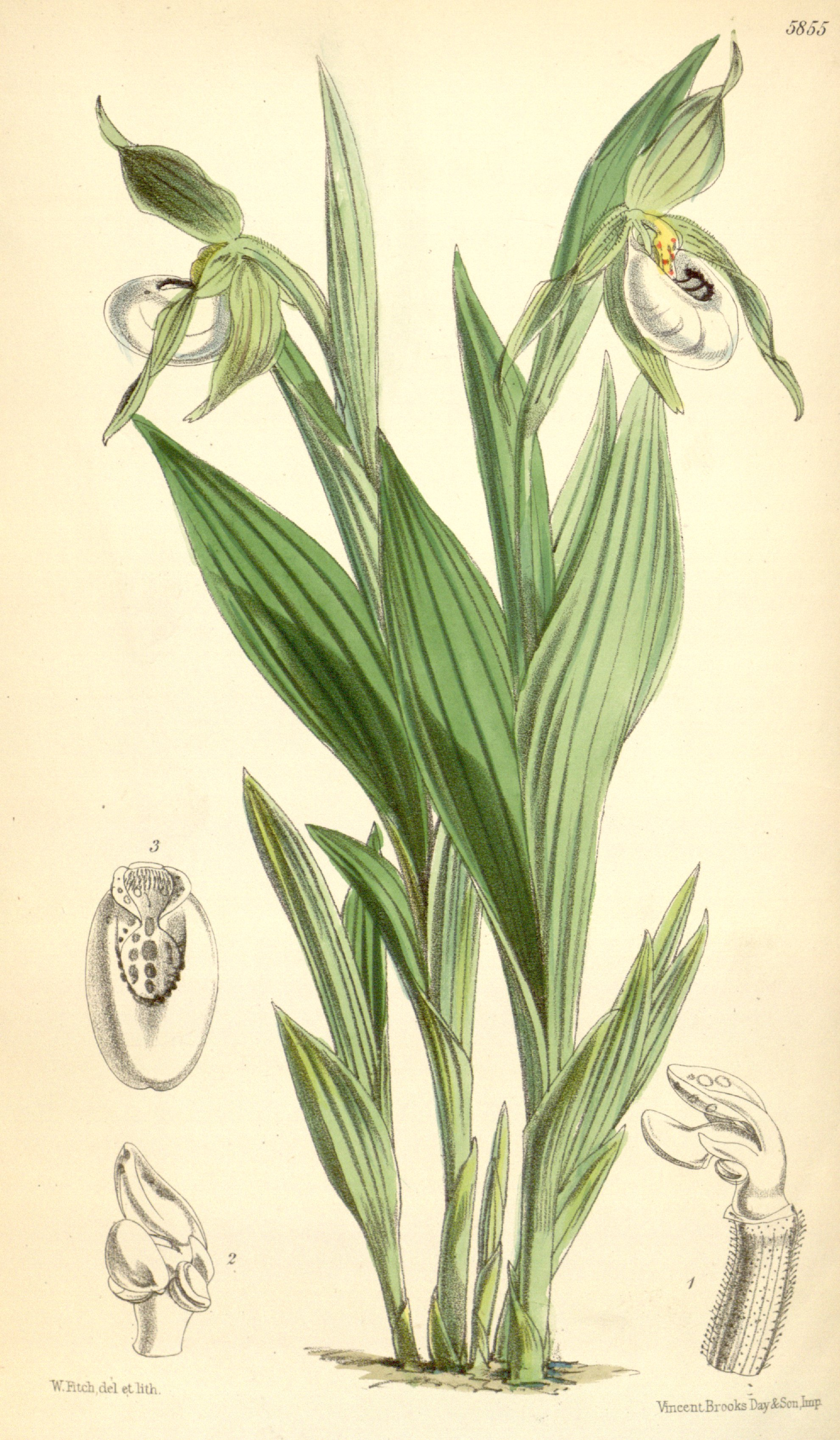
Small Lady's Slipper - extirpated species

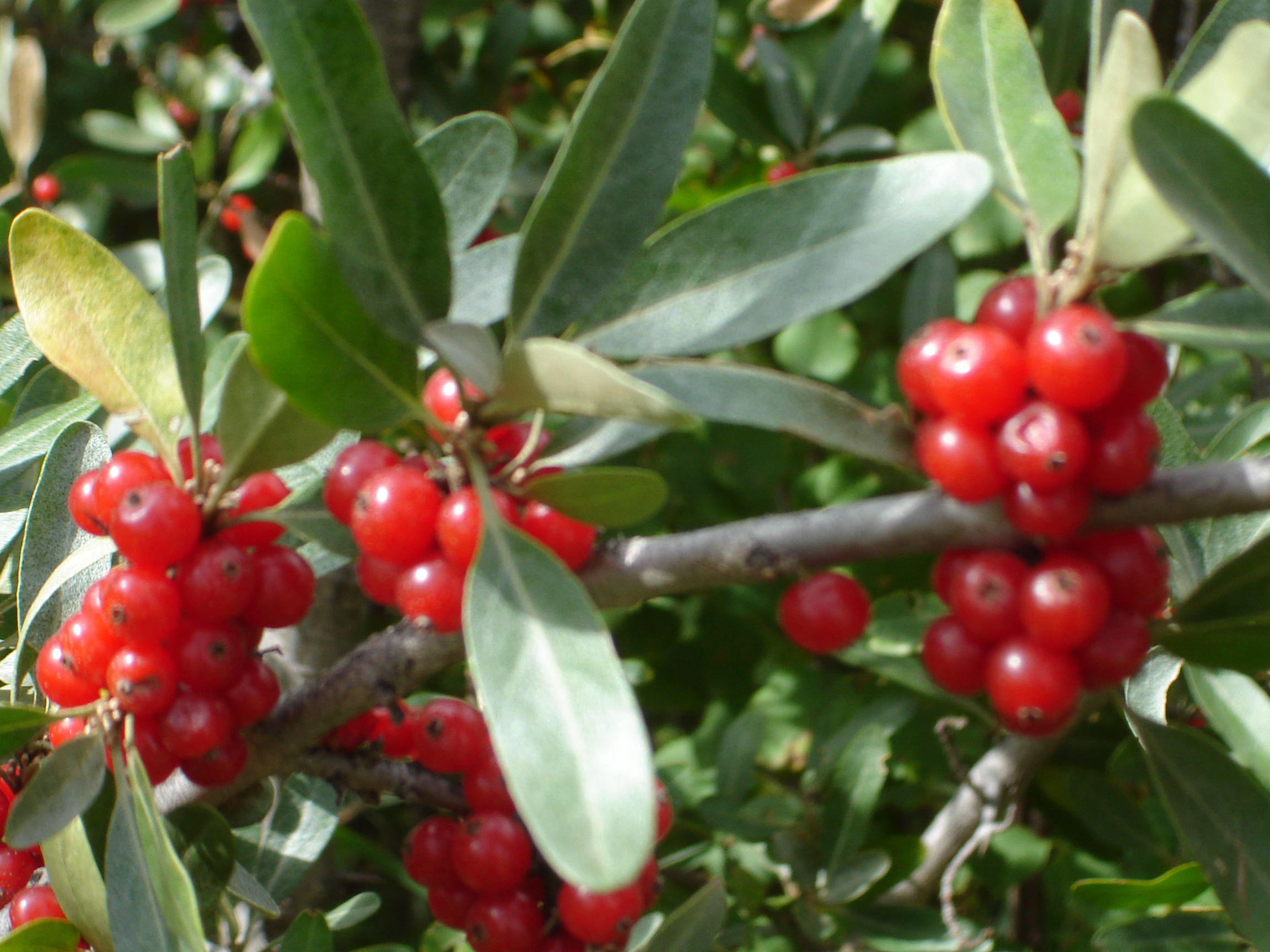
Silver buffaloberry

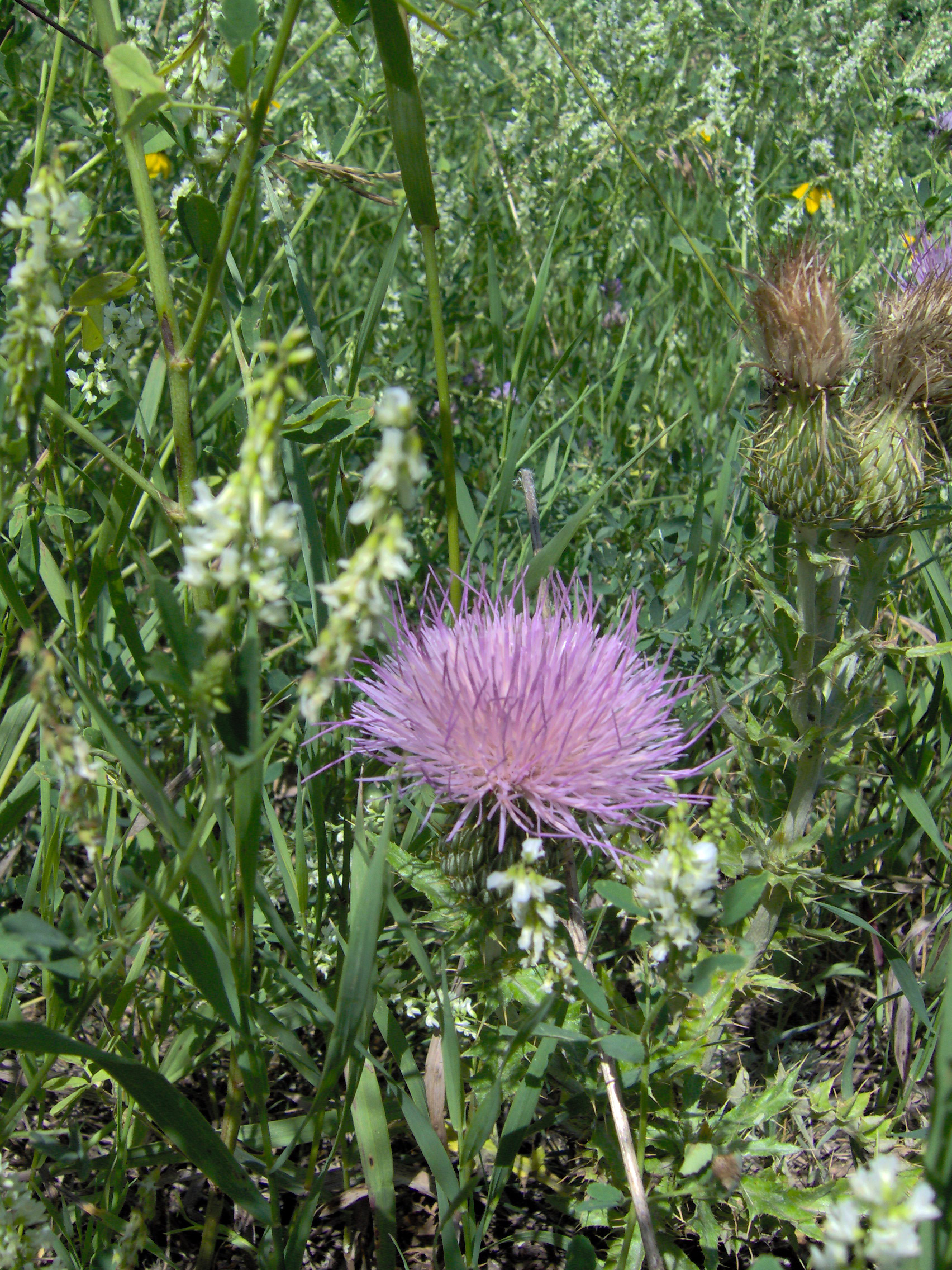
Canada thistle

The native flora of Saskatchewan includes vascular plants, plus additional species of other plants and plant-like organisms such as algae, lichens and other fungi, and mosses. Non-native species of plants are recorded as established outside of cultivation in Saskatchewan, of these some non-native species remain beneficial for gardening, and agriculture, where others have become invasive, noxious weeds. Saskatchewan is committed to protecting species at risk in Canada. The growing season has been studied and classified into plant hardiness zones depending on length of growing season and climatic conditions. Biogeographic factors have also been divided into vegetative zones, floristic kingdoms, hardiness zones and ecoregions across Saskatchewan, and natural vegetation varies depending on elevation, moisture, soil type landforms, and weather. The study of ethnobotany uncovers the interrelation between humans and plants and the various ways people have used plants for economic reasons, food, medicine and technological developments. The Government of Saskatchewan has declared 3 indigenous plants as provincial symbols.

== Growing season ==
Saskatchewan possesses a continental climate and the seasonal variations in temperature provide a short growing season. On average the province supports 159 to 160 frost-free days, in the far north that number diminishes to 85 to 95 frost free days. In 1967, Canadian scientists created a map outlining Plant Hardiness Zones. The hardiness zones examine climatic gradations such as length of frost-free period, summer rainfall, maximum summer temperatures, minimum winter temperatures, and wind speed. The harshest plant environment is 0 and the mildest is rated as 8. Corresponding data was correlated for plant requirements. Such an examination provides direction to which flora may survive the geographical hardiness zone conditions. A development in the late 1800s encouraged homesteaders to pursue agriculture. Red Fife wheat (Triticum aestivum) matured 20 days before other wheats, which allowed plants to ripen before the autumn frost.

== Protected and invasive species ==
Saskatchewan has 367 rare species of vascular plants of which 135 of these have been listed as endangered.

There is listed Small White Lady's Slipper (Cypripedium candidum) as the only local extinction, (extirpated) plant. Endangered plants include the Sand Verbena (Abronia micrantha), Western Spiderwort (Tradescantia occidentalis), Tiny Cryptantha (Cryptantha minima), and Hairy Prairie-Clover (Dalea villosa). Threatened plants include the Slender Mouse-Ear Cress (Halimolobos virgata). These two reports to aid in the protection of plants; Species at Risk In SK and Rare Plant Survey Guidelines. Saskatchewan has implemented The Weed Control Act to control plants introduced to Saskatchewan which have become a threat to the natural biodiversity such as leafy spurge (Euphorbia esula). There are two reports in this regard; Invasive Species and Noxious Weeds of Saskatchewan.

Saskatchewan's commitment to the Accord for the Protection of Species at Risk in Canada, which was ratified by provinces, territories and the federal government in September of 1998,"

— Saskatchewan Environment and Resource Management Minister Lorne Scott (1999)

Section 15 (1) of the Act states: "Every owner or occupant of land shall:

(a) under the supervision of the weed inspector, eradicate any prohibited weeds located on the land;

(b) under the supervision of the weed inspector, eradicate any isolated infestations of noxious weeds located on the land;

(c) contain and control any established infestations of noxious weeds located on the land; and

(d) take measures to control any nuisance weeds located on the land."

— The Weed Control Act.

== Provincial symbols ==
The tree which was designated in 1988 as a symbol of Saskatchewan is the paper birch Betula papyrifera. Saskatchewan's provincial flower is the Western red lily Lilium philadelphicum var. andinum (a protected species) designated in 1941. Needle-and-thread grass Hesperostipa comata is Saskatchewan's provincial grass declared in 2001.

== Floristic kingdom ==
Saskatchewan is within the Holarctic Kingdom. There are two regions within this kingdom, the Circumboreal floristic region or which provides a cool northern temperate zone and the North American Atlantic Region in Southern Saskatchewan which is part of a warmer Midwestern Plains zone. These zones are characterized by a certain degree of endemism.

== Ecoregions ==
An ecoregion encompasses soil types and landform similarities. The Taiga Shield ecozone in the far north includes the Selwyn Lake upland and Tazin Lake Upland ecoregion. This would have vegetation generally corresponding to the Subarctic Woodland. The Boreal Shield ecozone is further divided into the Athabasca Plain and Churchill River Upland, and this area of Northern Saskatchewan has been described by the World Wildlife Fund as part of the Midwestern Canadian Shield forests ecoregion. The Boreal Plains ecozone comprises the Mid-Boreal Upland, Mid-Boreal Lowland and Boreal Transition ecoregions. Further south is the Prairie ecozone which consists of the Aspen Parkland, Moist Mixed Prairie, Northern Mixed Grassland and Cypress Upland ecoregions. The ecoregions are further divided into Landscape Areas.

== Vegetative zones ==
Several biogeographic factors contribute to the richness and diversity of Saskatchewan flora. From north to south there are a variety of vegetative zones. To the far north are the Subarctic Woodland and Northern Boreal Forest. The Southern Boreal Forest is south of the treeline. The Prairie is divided into the Aspen Parkland, Moist Mixed Grassland, Mixed Grassland, Cypress Upland and Fescue Grassland. In southeast Saskatchewan are Dry Mixed Prairie of the Great Sand Hills area and the Cypress Hills.

=== Subarctic Woodland ===
Upon the Canadian Shield and in the coolest weather, are subarctic lichen woodland. The black spruce (Picea Mariana), jack pine (Pinus banksiana), and white spruce (Picea glauca) are commonly occurring trees. This area is interspersed with peatlands, bogs, fens, permafrost areas, and areas of arctic tundra. Yellow and Grey Reindeer moss (Cladonia mitis) provide ground cover. The Subarctic Woodland corresponds to Canada's hardiness zone 0a.

=== Northern Boreal Forest ===
The circumpolar boreal forest or taiga is dominated by conifers or aspen and poplar stands.

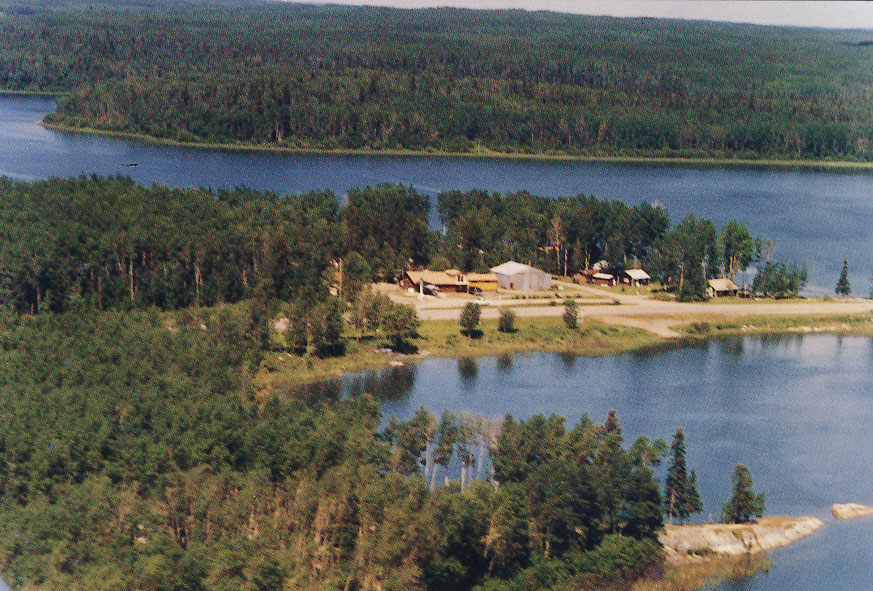
Boreal forest

Throughout this area are lakes, bogs, forest and rock outcroppings. Black spruce, jack pine once again are the main trees of the area. Forest fires are a concern in this area, and Fireweed (Epilobium angustifolium) occurs in burnt areas. Cladonia cetraria and C. tereocaulon are lichen species which provide ground cover. Feather mosses such as Stair-Step Moss (Hylocomium splendens) and Hypnum are amongst the undergrowth. Where the rock is covered in soils, the forest takes on the characteristics and species of the Southern Boreal Forest ecozone. The plant hardiness zone would be Zone 0b.

The Athabasca Basin provides a separate ecosystem. The Athabasca Sand Hills protected by The Athabasca Sand Dunes Provincial Park are unique feature of the Canadian shield. The hills are located in northern Saskatchewan and border Lake Athabasca, which straddles the Alberta and Saskatchewan border. There is sparse plant life in the sand hills area. Blueberry, Bearberry (Arctostaphylos uva-ursi ), Sand Heather (Hudsonia tomentosa), Crowberry (Empetrum) and grasses survive here. In this ecozone there are 10 species of endemic plants. There are unique four species of Willow (Salix).

=== Southern Boreal Forest ===
Mixedwood boreal forest with jack pine, trembling aspen (Populus tremuloides ), white spruce, and tamarack (Larix laricina) populate the Southern Boreal Forest which also houses the forestry industry.

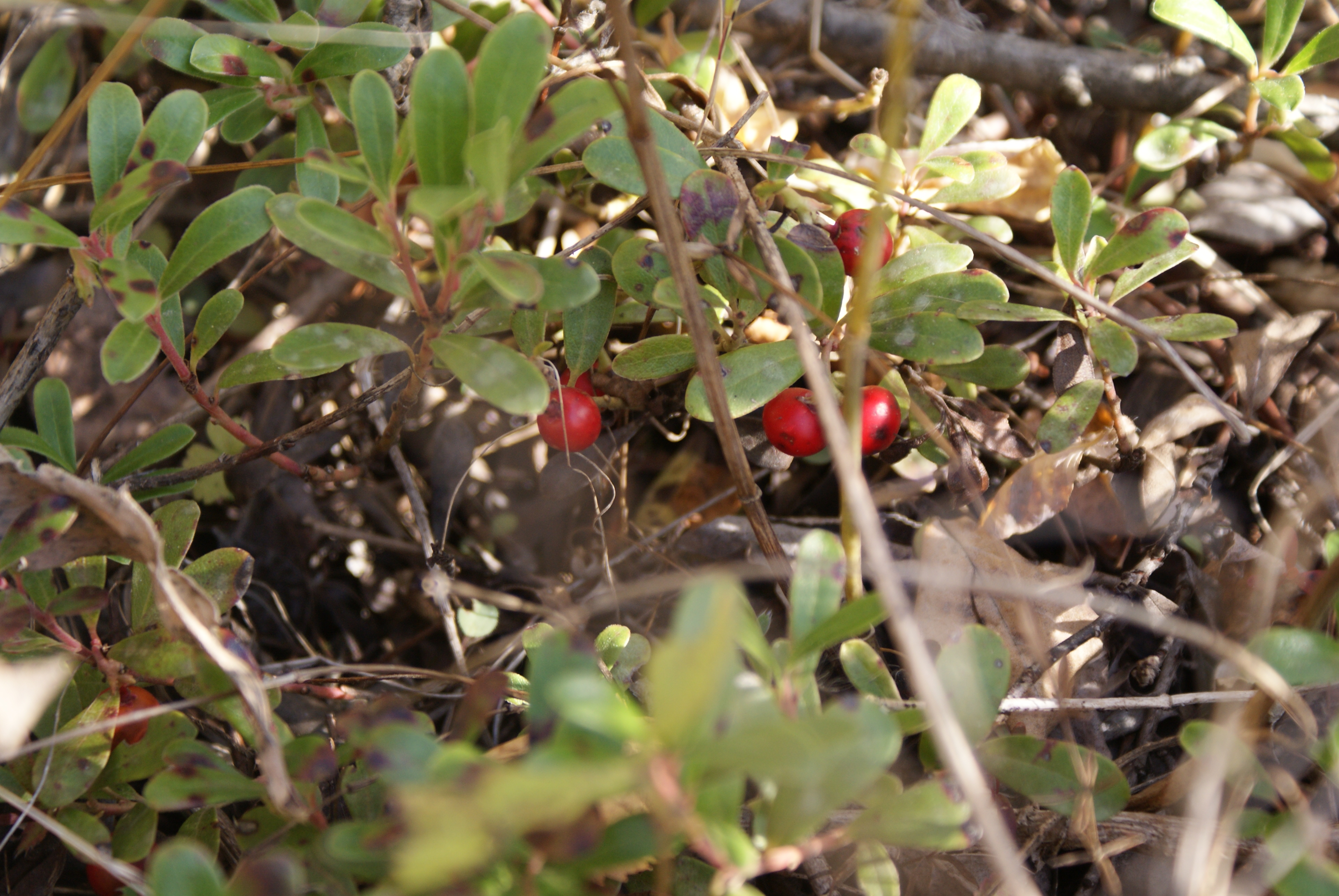
Bearberry

The ground cover is lichen and stairstep moss. Bearberry, low-bush cranberry (Vaccinium vitis-idaea), Red Osier Dogwood (Cornus sericea, syn. C. stolonifera, Swida sericea) predominate the shrub layer. Peatlands, fens, marsh complexes occur with wetter soils such as those found above the basin of the Quaternary Glacial Lake Agassiz in the south eastern portion of the Southern Boreal Forest. 16% of the boreal forest are wetlands which have a water table at or above ground level. The province is the world's largest producer of wild rice.

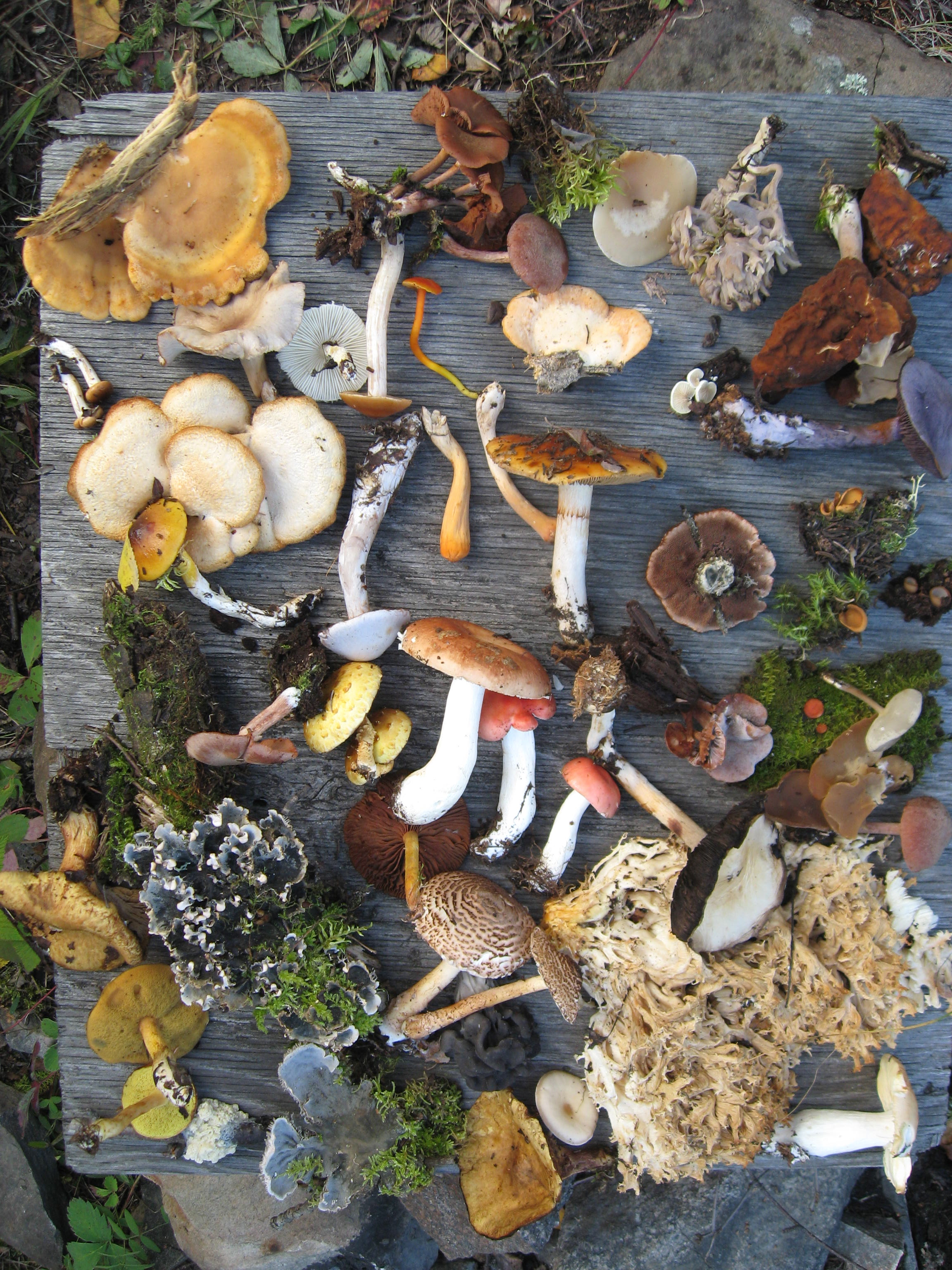
Mushrooms, lichens, moss and other bryophytes.

Bog Labrador Tea (Ledum groenlandicum), Sphagnum mosses, and cloudberry (Rubus chamaemorus) flourish in the peatland areas. Bogs have a high acidic layer, high water table and low nutrients. Fens support the brown mosses such as Drepanocladus, Brachythecium, Calliergonelia, Scorpidium, Campylium. Reed Grass (Calamagrostis), Willows, marsh cinquefoil (Potentilla), and False Solomon's Seal (Maianthemum racemosum) gow in fen regions. Fens have a high water table with slow drainage which is rich in nutrients. Marshes are surrounded by willows and support Marsh reed grass (Calamagrostis), Kentucky blue grass (Poa pratensis), Fowl blue grass (Poa palustris), beaked sedge (Carex rostrata), bulrush (Scirpus validus and S. acutus). Marshes have slow moving slightly alkaline water and are very rich in nutrient and minerals. Bogs, fens, and marshes together comprise muskeg regions. Hardiness zone 1a describes the Southern Boreal Forest.

=== Aspen Parkland ===
The Aspen parkland corresponds to the Transitional Grassland Ecoclimatic Region with lower precipitation and a higher average annual temperature of about 1.3 °C (34.3 °F).

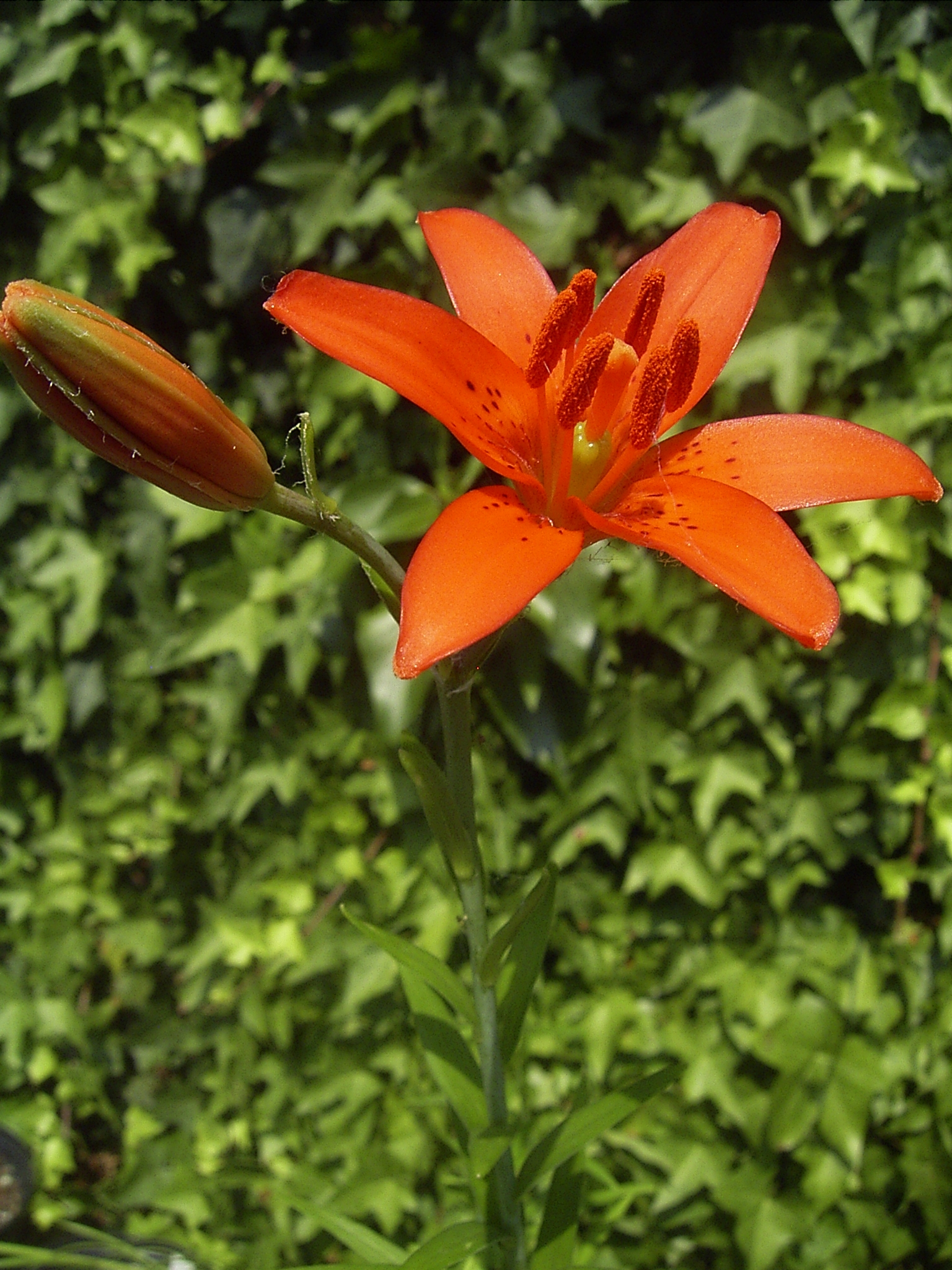
Saskatchewan Flower: Western red lily Protected species

Trembling aspen form bluffs (small islands or shelter belts) which are typical in this area. The Aspen Parkland is a transitional area between the mixed woodland and prairie grasslands. The Aspen Parkland can be divided into eastern, central and western. The eastern area produces tall grass prairie featuring big bluestem (andropogon gerardi) and Porcupine grass (Stipa spartea). Trees in this area are Bur Oak, (Quercus macrocarpa), Green ash (Fraxinus pennsylvanica), Manitoba maple (Acer negundo), and balsam poplar (Populus sect. Tacamahaca) as well as aspen. Fescue grasses such as Festuca hallii and western porcupine grass (Stipa curtiseta) make up the native Fescue grasslands of central Saskatchewan. The aspen tree stands are still poplar, and interspersed with willow in wetter areas.

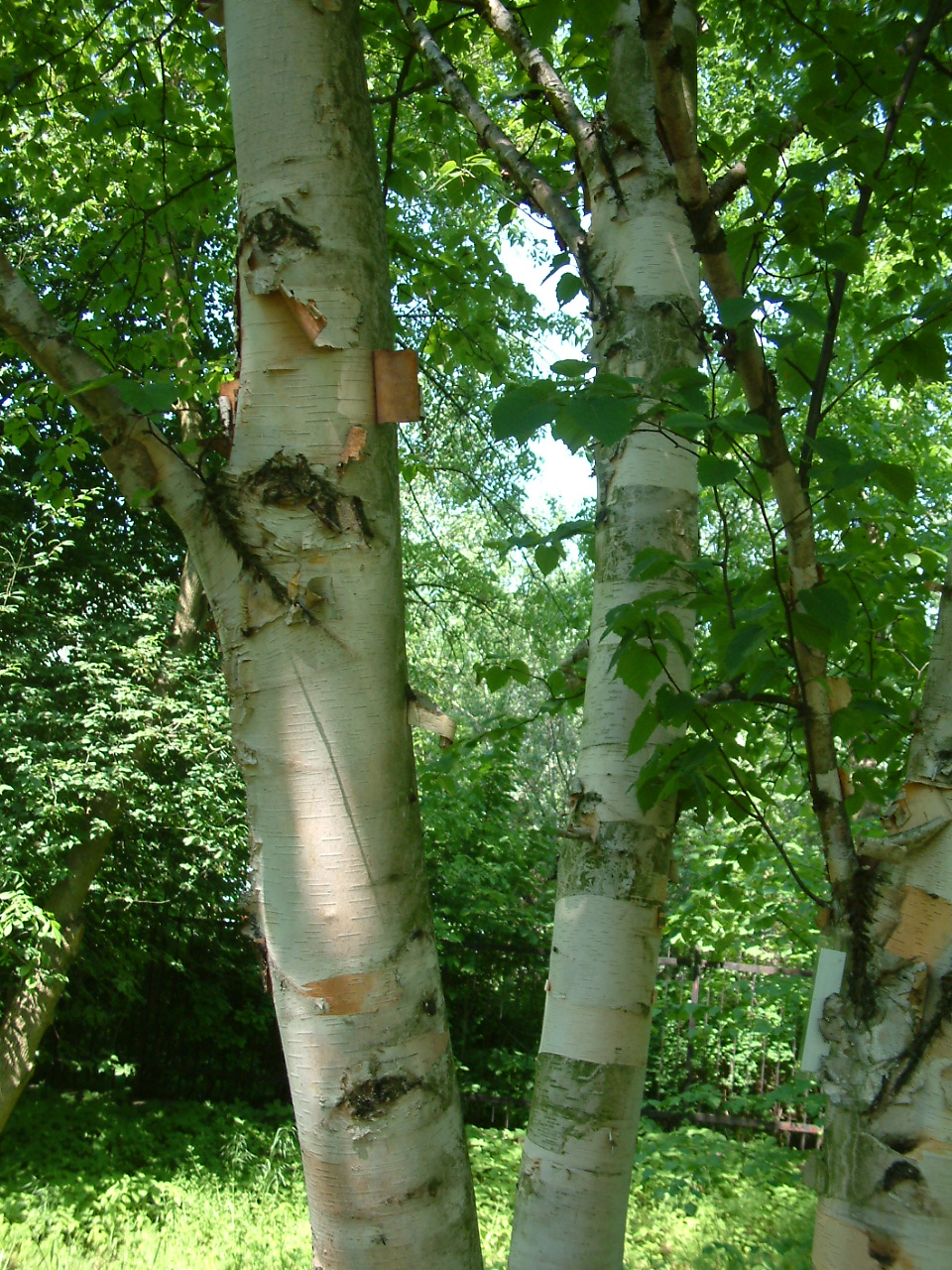
Tree: Paper Birch

The western parkland has ground cover of plains rough fescue Needle and thread grass (Hesperostipa comata). Tree groves are aspen, willows and balsam poplar. Throughout the Aspen Parkland in low-lying areas with more moisture are dense shrub stands. Saskatoon (Amelanchier alnifolia), pin cherry (Prunus pensylvanica), choke cherry (Prunus virginiana), hawthorn (Crataegus), western snow berry (Symphoricarpos), woods rose (Rosa woodsii), Wolf willow (Elaeagnus commutata) and Canada buffaloberry (Shepherdia canadensis) are a few of the shrubs of the area. The marshes and prairie sloughs of the Aspen Parkland support flora similar to the marshlands of the Southern Boreal Forest. The Aspen Parkland ranges between 1b, 2a and 2b for plant hardiness areas.

=== Mixed Prairie ===
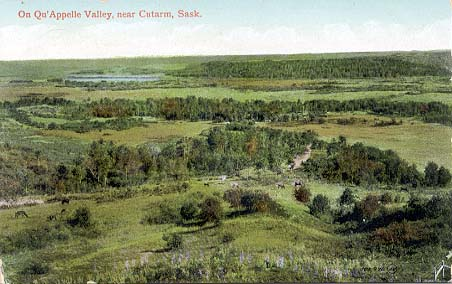
Qu'Appelle Valley near Cutarm, Sask., circa 1910

The Mixed Grass Prairie correlates to the Arid Grassland Ecoclimatic Region and hardiness zone 2a and 3a. Big sandgrass, blue grama (Bouteloua gracilis) grass grow in the higher dry areas. At lower saline sites alkali grass (Puccinellia alroides), salt grass (Distichlis spicata), foxtail or wild barley (Hordeum jubatum), and arrowgrass (Triglochin maritima) are found. Needle and thread grass, northern wheat grass (Elymus lanceolatus), hair sedge (Carex atherodes), bottle sedge (Carex rostrata) grow in the intermediate mesic sites, with cottonwoods and willow growing along riverbanks.

=== Dry mixed prairie ===
Southwest Saskatchewan has very dry climatic conditions and features a semi-arid climate. Dry mixed prairie is found south of Cypress Hills and the Great Sand Hills area near Leader. Prickly pear cactus (Opuntia), blue grama grass, needle and thread grass, silver sagebrush (Artemisia cana) and June grass (Koeleria) are found in the areas.

=== Cypress Hills ===
The Cypress Hills has an elevation over 1,200 metres (3,900 ft), with cooler resulting temperatures and higher precipitation which are more similar to the boreal forest than the prairie grasslands.

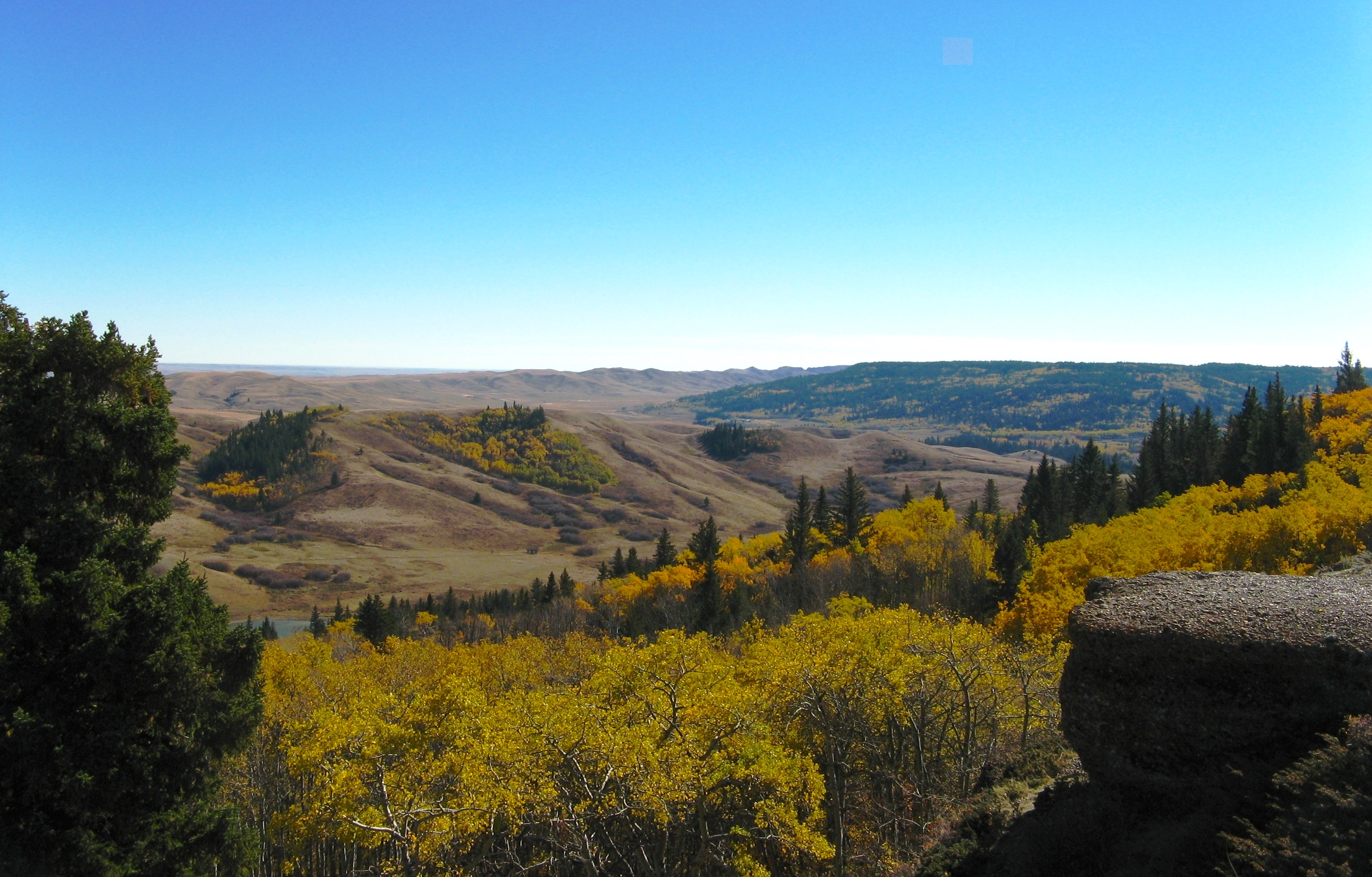
Cypress Hills

Lodgepole Pine (Pinus contorta) occurs only in the Cypress Hills area of Saskatchewan and also in the Rocky Mountain forests. Aspen, and white spruce are other trees of the Cypress Hills forests. Shining leaved meadowsweet (Spiraea lucida), low larkspur (Delphinium bicolor ), pinegrass (Calamagrostis rubescens ) provide ground cover.

== Ethnobotany ==
There are many native plants of Saskatchewan which can be prepared as vegetables, teas, wine, jams, syrups and flour. Other plants have medicinal qualities. The harvest of various plants varies. Shoots, and leaves of some plants are harvested, while roots and tubers of others are picked like potatoes. Marshy pond edges reveal broad leaf cattail, or yellow pond lily (Nuphar advena).

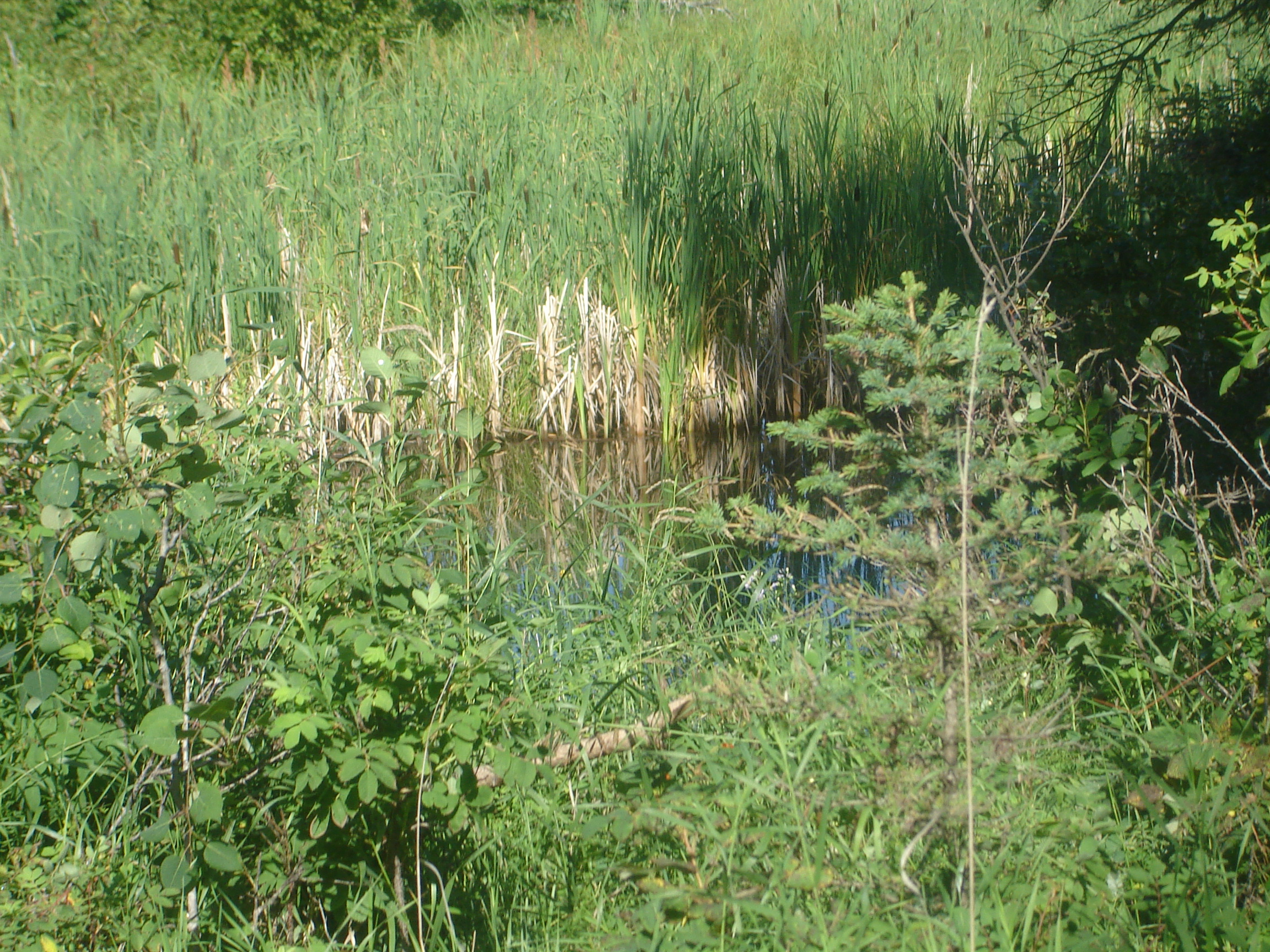
Marsh area. Blueberry, strawberry, dewberry, plantain, shaggy mane mushrooms, cattail, Labrador tea, bearberry, strawberry blight, puffball mushrooms and wild mint can be harvested near this site.

Disturbed sites produce chickweed, and plantain (Musa). Asparagus (Asparagus officinalis) shoots grow near roadsides. There are plants which are poisonous, and edible plants which have poisonous look alike.

Strawberry (Fragaria vesca), wild mint (Mentha arvensis), and Labrador tea leaves can be steeped in boiling water for tea. Saskatoons, blueberries and other berries can be hand-picked for jam, jelly, syrup and juice preparation. Blackberry, dewberry, blueberry, buffaloberry, currant, huckleberry, prickly pear, raspberry, and rose hips all make delicious jams or jellies. Pies can be made of currants, blackberries, mountain ash, or strawberries, for example. Hull grass seeds and grind them down into flour.

Herbal solutions used as remedies for ailments could be ingested as tea, used as ointments, or poultices or inhaled as smoke or steam from a decoction. Cow parsnip (Heracleum maximum) and broad-leaved water plantain (Alisma plantago-aquatica) are two herbal remedies which were cultivated by the Cree. However, the cow parsnip does have a poisonous look-alike species, the western water hemlock, (Cicuta douglasii, poison hemlock).

Flora of Saskatchewan have also aided humans in other ways; trees provide wood such as birch bark for canoes, reeds could be fashioned into whistles and baskets. Sphagnum mosses were used for their insulating qualities, as well mosses were absorbent for diapers, and had antibacterial properties.

== Botanists ==
Eugène Bourgeau (1813 - 1877) was the botanist who traveled with Captain John Palliser (1817–1887) and Henry Youle Hind (1823 - 1908) during the British North American Exploring Expedition.

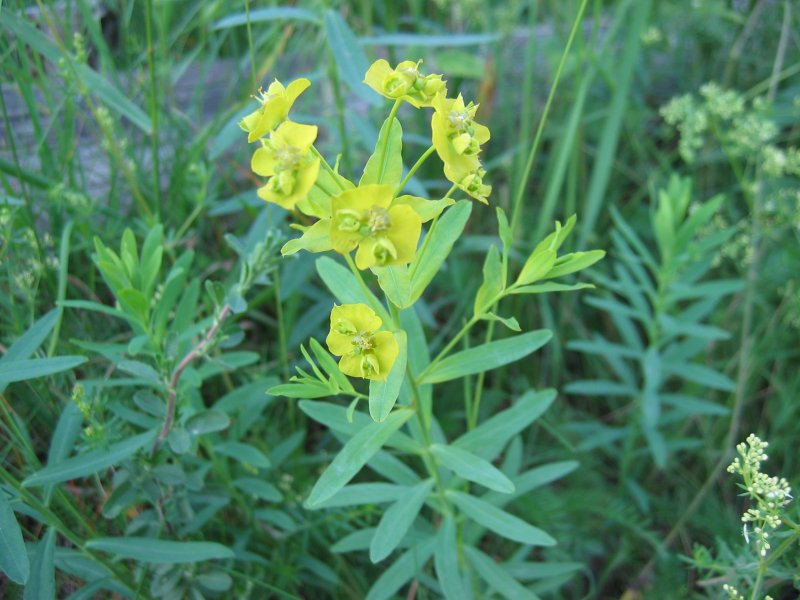
Green Spurge or Leafy Spurge invasive species

The results of these investigations between 1857 and 1861 resulted in reporting the area unsuitable for agriculture and an area of particularly dry land was named the Palliser's Triangle. John Macoun (1831-1920) was a naturalist who accompanied Sir Sanford Fleming to the prairies in 1872 and he offered agricultural possibilities for the region. Isabel M. Priestly (1893-1946) was a botanist who made botanical collections and formed the Yorkton Natural History Society. Dr. William P. Fraser is the namesake of the W.P. Fraser Herbarium. His botanical collection was donated to the Biology Department at the University of Saskatchewan where he was a professor. Later the Fraser collections were transferred to the Department of Plant Ecology in the College of Agriculture. Dr. John K. Jeglum was a research botanist with Great Lakes Forestry Centre (GLFC). He received his doctorate at the University of Saskatchewan his thesis on Lowland vegetation at Candle Lake, Southern Boreal Forest Saskatchewan resulted in a collection of Saskatchewan specimens.

== Agriculture ==
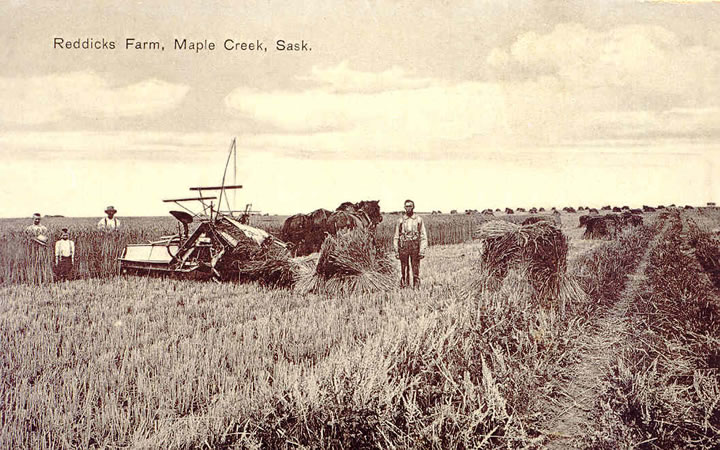
Harvest time

Agriculture in Saskatchewan is the production of various food, feed, or fiber commodities to fulfill domestic and international human and animal sustenance needs. The newest agricultural economy to be developed in renewable biofuel production or agricultural biomass which is marketed as ethanol or biodiesel. cultivation and livestock production have abandoned subsistence agricultural practices in favor of intensive technological farming resulting in cash crops which contribute to the economy of Saskatchewan. The particular commodity produced is dependent upon its particular biogeography or ecozone of Geography of Saskatchewan. Agricultural techniques and activities have evolved over the years. The first nation nomadic hunter-gatherer lifestyle and the early immigrant ox and plow farmer proving up on his quarter section of land in no way resemble the present farmer operating huge amounts of land or livestock with their attendant technological mechanization.

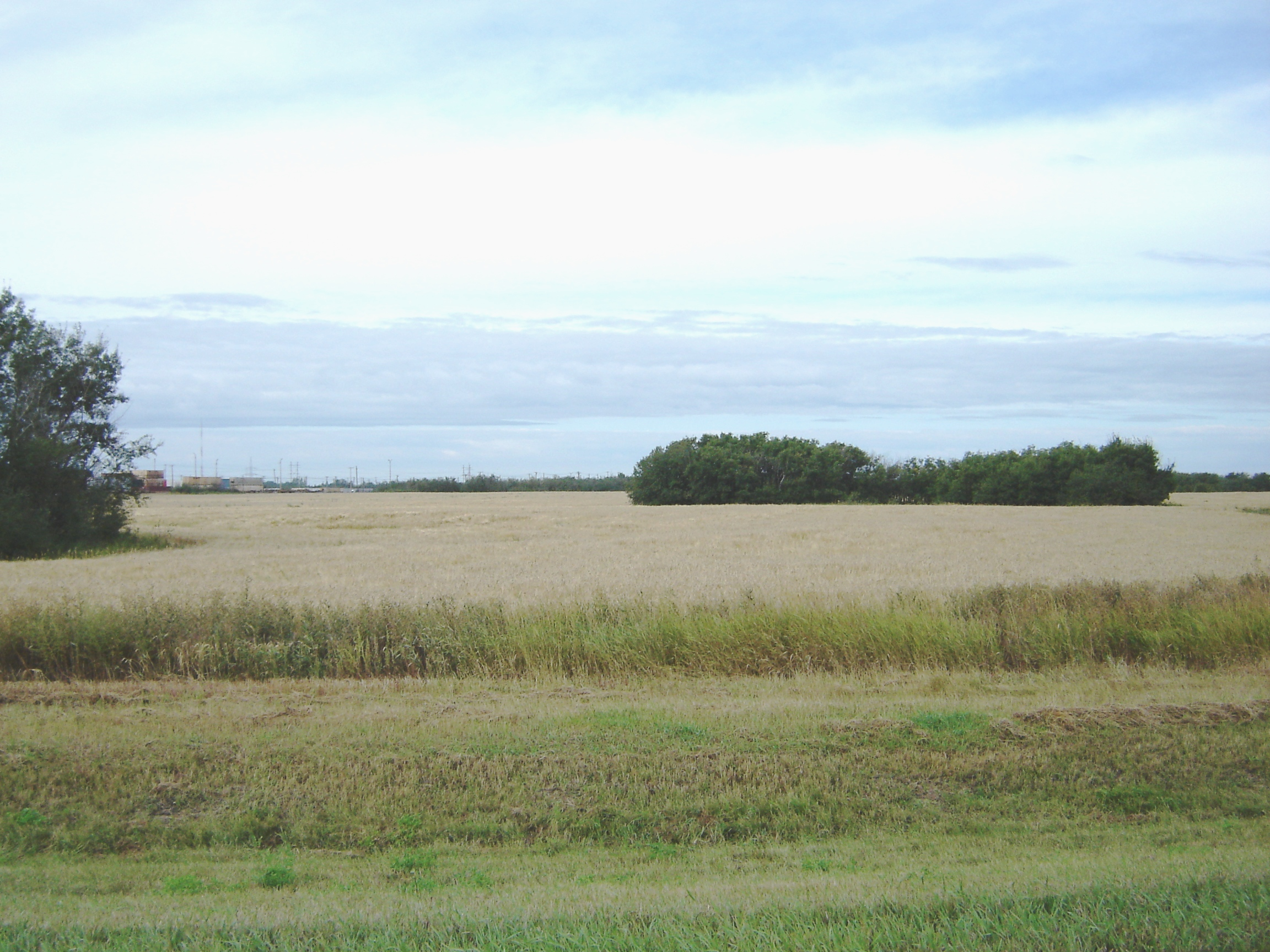
Grain field in the aspen parkland near Saskatoon

Challenges to the future of Saskatchewan agriculture include developing sustainable water management strategies for a cyclical drought prone climate in south western Saskatchewan, updating dryland farming techniques, stabilizing organic definitions or protocols and the decision to grow, or not to grow genetically modified foods. Domestically and internationally, some commodities have faced increased scrutiny from disease and the ensuing marketing issues.

Canada's production of wheat, oats, flaxseed, and barley come mainly from Saskatchewan and the prairie provinces. Saskatchewan still has cattle ranching along the southwestern corner of the province, However, grain farming and growing crops such as wheat, oats, flax, alfalfa, and rapeseed (especially canola) dominate the parkland area. Mixed grain farming, dairy farms, mixed livestock and grazing lands dot the central lowlands region of this prairie province. As of 1996, March 24 to 30, has been proclaimed Agriculture Week in Saskatchewan.

== Forestry ==
In the northern part of the province, forestry is significant. North of the treeline in Saskatchewan are 350,000 square kilometres (140,000 sq mi) of forests which provide resources for the Saskatchewan forestry industry. The forestry industry comprises lumber and sodium sulphate for pulp and paper resources.

== Physiographic regions ==
Physiographic regions -with some of the area's main features
Physiographic Region	Bedrock Geology	Dominant soils	Natural Vegetation
Canadian Shield
Rock knob complex	Igneous rocks and Precambrian Missi Series	Lodzolic forest soils	Lichen woodland black spruce pine
Athabasca Plains	Precambrian Athabasca Formation	Rough rock land; bedrock exposures	pine
Central Lowlands
Manitoba Lowlands	Cretaceous formations	Chernozemic soils	Aspen fescue spear/wheat grass
Saskatchewan Plains	Cretaceous formations	Chernozemic soils	Aspen fescue spear/wheat grass
Great Plains
Alberta Plateau	Tertiary formations	Regozolic and solonetzic soil mixtures	spear grass / blue grama

== See also ==
- Canadian Prairies
- Canada's landforms
- Canadian Shield
- Forestry Farm Park and Zoo
- List of ecoregions in Canada
- List of terrestrial ecoregions (WWF)
- List of ecoregions in North America (CEC)
- List of Wildlife Species at Risk
- Prairie
