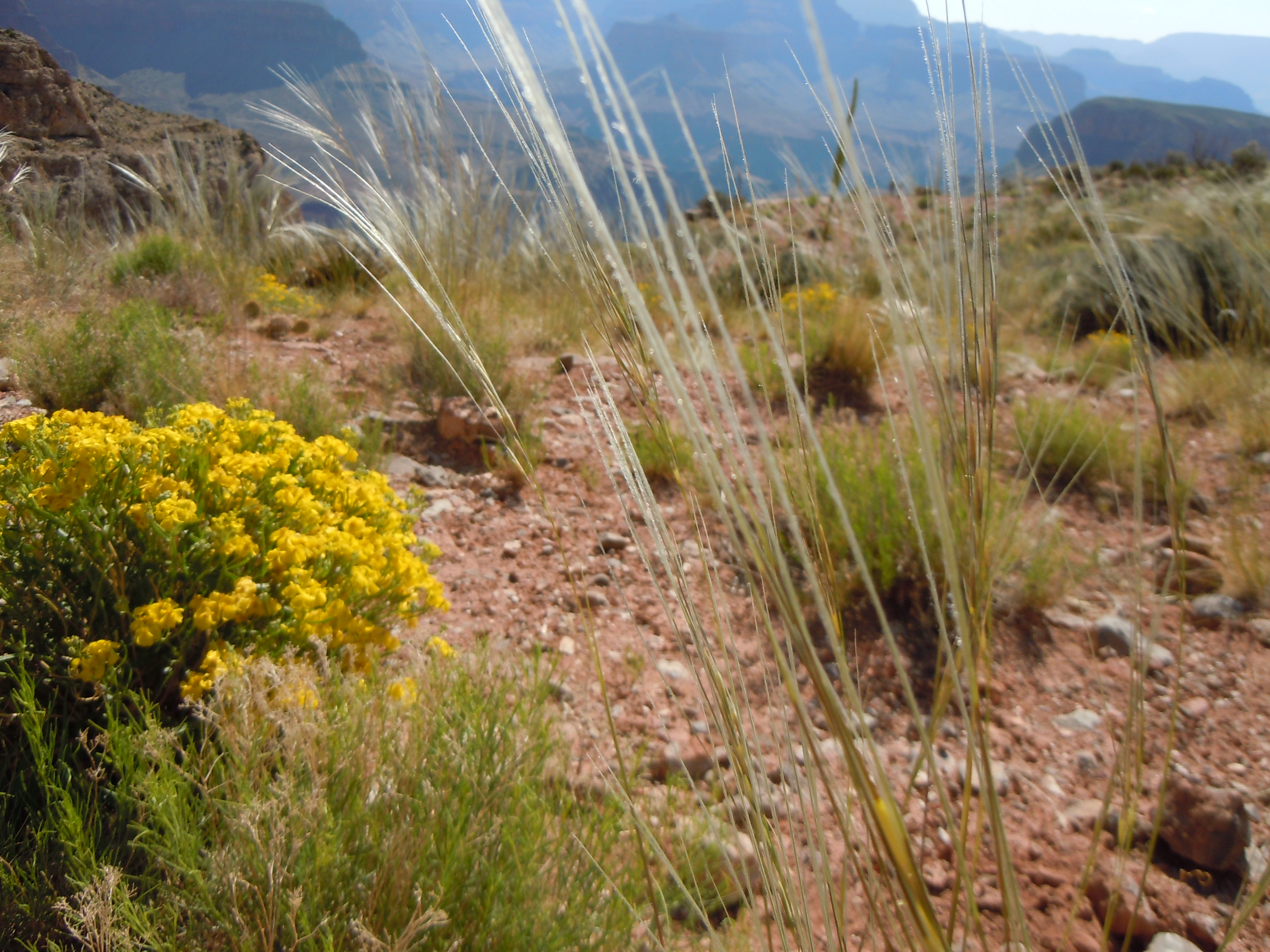
- Hesperostipa neomexicana

Scientific classification
- Kingdom: Plantae
- Clade: Tracheophytes
- Clade: Angiosperms
- Clade: Monocots
- Clade: Commelinids
- Order: Poales
- Family: Poaceae
- Subfamily: Pooideae
- Supertribe: Stipodae
- Tribe: Stipeae
- Genus: Hesperostipa (M.K.Elias) Barkworth

Species
- See text

= Hesperostipa =

Genus of grasses

Hesperostipa is a genus of grasses in the family Poaceae. Members of the genus are commonly known as needle-and-thread grass or needlegrass.

The Hesperostipa species, formerly called Stipa, are endemic to North America. The new name adds Classical Greek: ἕσπερος, romanized: hesperos, lit. 'western', as other Stipa species are found on the Eurasian continent (i.e., the eastern hemisphere).

== Species ==
- Hesperostipa comata (Trin. & Rupr.) Barkworth – needle-and-thread grass
  - Hesperostipa comata subsp. comata
  - Hesperostipa comata subsp. intermedia (Scribn. & Tweedy) Barkworth
- Hesperostipa curtiseta (Hitchc.) Barkworth – Canadian needlegrass
- Hesperostipa neomexicana (Thurb.) Barkworth – New Mexico needlegrass
- Hesperostipa saxicola (Hitchc.) Valdés-Reyna & Barkworth
- Hesperostipa spartea (Trin.) Barkworth – porcupine grass
