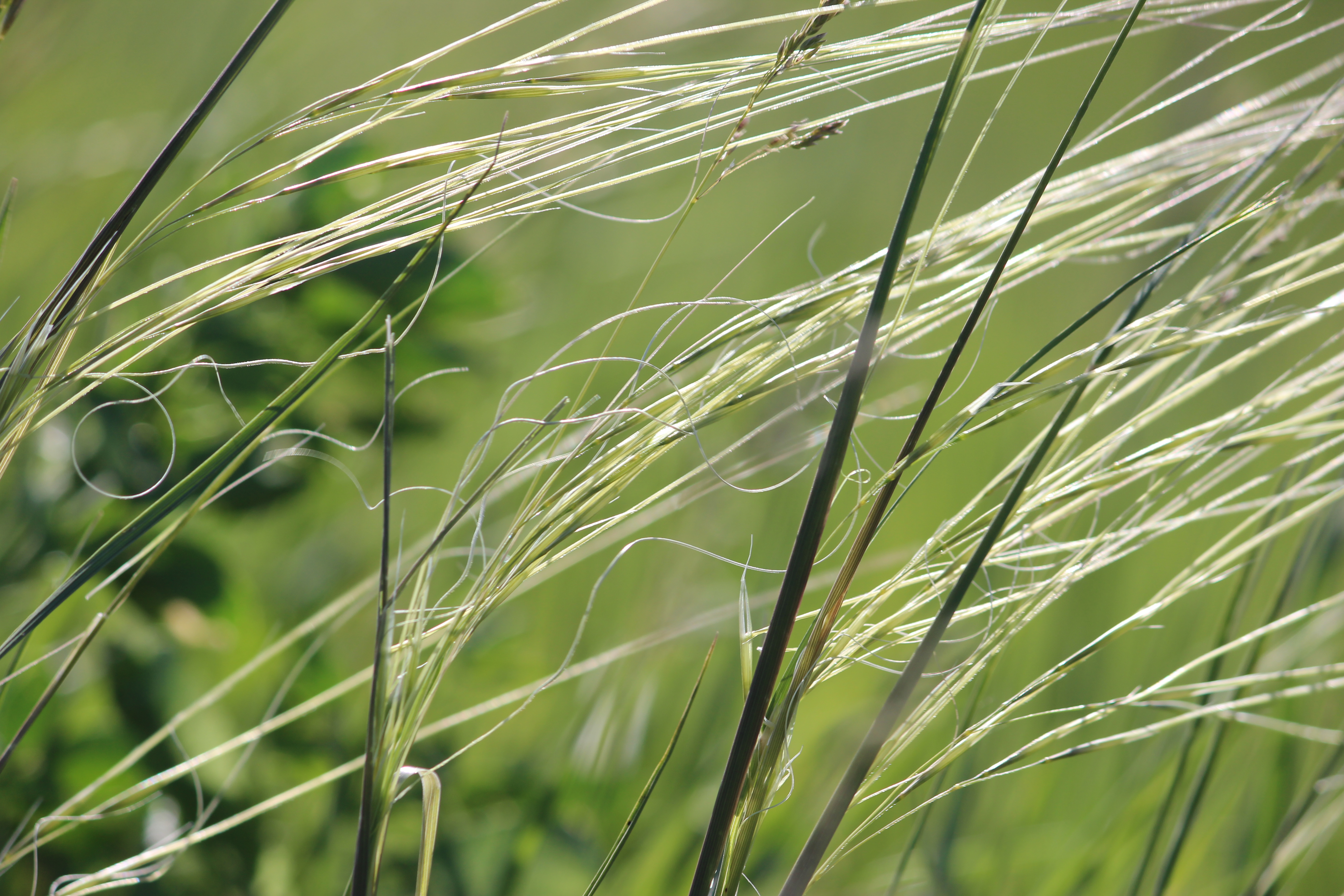

Conservation status
- Secure (NatureServe)

Scientific classification
- Kingdom: Plantae
- Clade: Tracheophytes
- Clade: Angiosperms
- Clade: Monocots
- Clade: Commelinids
- Order: Poales
- Family: Poaceae
- Subfamily: Pooideae
- Genus: Hesperostipa
- Species: H. spartea

Binomial name
- Hesperostipa spartea (Trin.) Barkworth

Synonyms
- Stipa spartea

= Hesperostipa spartea =

Species of flowering plant

Hesperostipa spartea, formerly Stipa spartea, is a species of grass known by the common names porcupine grass, western porcupine grass, short-awn porcupine grass, porcupine needlegrass, and big needlegrass. It is native to North America, where it is widespread from British Columbia to Ontario in Canada and through the central and Great Lakes regions of the United States. It is a bunchgrass species in the genus Hesperostipa.

== Distribution ==
Hesperostipa spartea is native to the Great Plains and Canadian Prairies of North America. It is also found in grasslands of the Rocky Mountains in Western Canada and the Western United States.

This grass is common and is a dominant grass in various prairie and grassland ecosystems in the Great Plains. In Alberta it is codominant with rough fescue on the grasslands. In other areas it may be codominant with little bluestem. It may be a pioneer species or a climax species, occurring in all stages of ecological succession. It thrives on poor soils and it can invade disturbed habitat such as gopher mounds. It can also be a long-term component of climax grassland and prairie.

== Description ==
This perennial bunchgrass is similar to needle-and-thread grass, but it has longer, wider, paler leaves. It can reach over a metre in height. The roots are known to reach 1.8 metres (5.9 feet) deep into the soil. The inflorescence is a panicle of spikelets. Each fruit has a very long, twisted awn, reaching up to 19 centimetres (7.5 inches) in length. As the grass expands or contracts according to the temperature and moisture conditions, the awns twist or untwist to eventually drill the seeds into the soil – a phenomenon known as geocarpy. The awns containing several seeds may tangle together and the mass is blown away from the parent plant on the wind. They also stick to animals, another vector of seed dispersal.

Hesperostipa spartea has a bunchgrass foliage mass of 3–6 feet (0.91–1.83 m) in diameter The flower stalks are upright and arching, yellow, in late Spring.

The seeds are needle-like with sharp tips and long tails. The tails are composed of two different strands that dry at different rates and twist around each other, causing the sharp head of the seed to be driven into the soil. Just behind the sharp, needle-like tip, is a collar of long thick hairs that face backward, preventing the seeds from working their way back out of the soil.

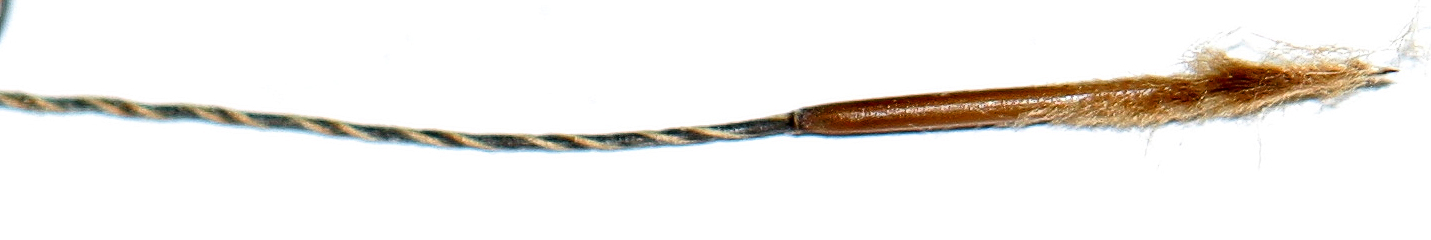
Hesperostipa spartea: note the two differently colored strands wrapping around the tails: they twist at different rates depending on the humidity of the air.

== Agricultural implications ==
This species of grass can have its seeds entangled in sheep's hair while they are feeding, and once entangled it often works its way into the animal's skin.

This grass is not ideal for livestock but it is generally palatable, especially in the spring. It is also valuable in the fall when it remains green as other grasses dry out. When the fruit is mature, the long, sharp awns reduce the palatability of the grass.

== Cultivation ==
Hesperostipa spartea is cultivated as an ornamental grass for native plant gardens and natural landscaping, and as a plant for Great Plains—Prairie habitat restoration.

== Uses ==
Native Americans such as the Omaha and Pawnee made brushes from this plant by tying the awns together and burning off the sharp seeds at the ends.
