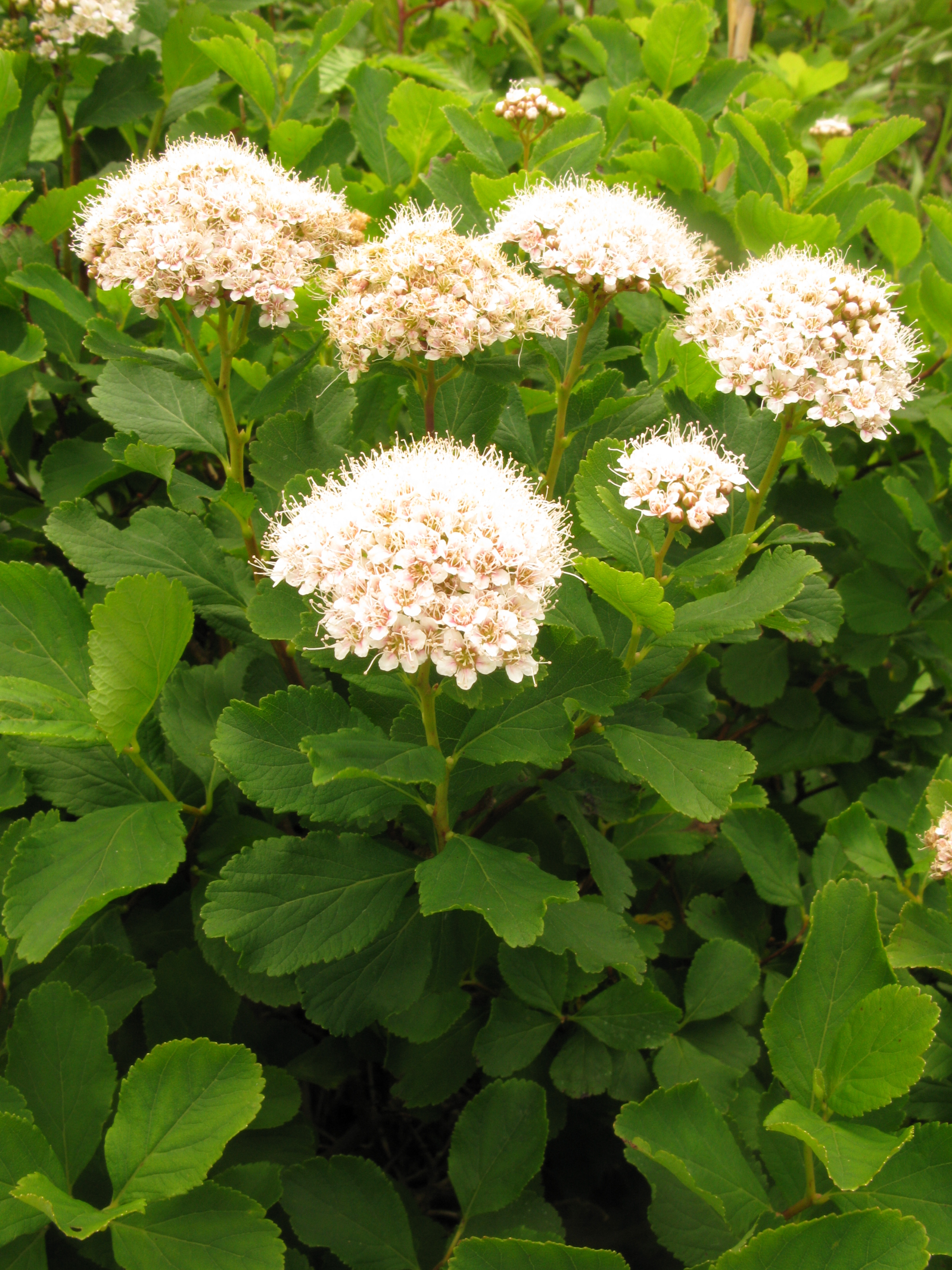

Scientific classification
- Kingdom: Plantae
- Clade: Tracheophytes
- Clade: Angiosperms
- Clade: Eudicots
- Clade: Rosids
- Order: Rosales
- Family: Rosaceae
- Genus: Spiraea
- Species: S. betulifolia

Binomial name
- Spiraea betulifolia Pall. (1784)

= Spiraea betulifolia =

Species of flowering plant

Spiraea betulifolia is a species of flowering plant in the family Rosaceae. It is primarily native from Eastern Siberia to Korea and Northern and Central Japan. The historically recognized varieties native to North America are var. corymbosa, native to a portion of eastern North America, and var. lucida, now known as Spiraea lucida, native to British Columbia and the northwestern United States eastward to Sasketchewan and the Black Hills.
