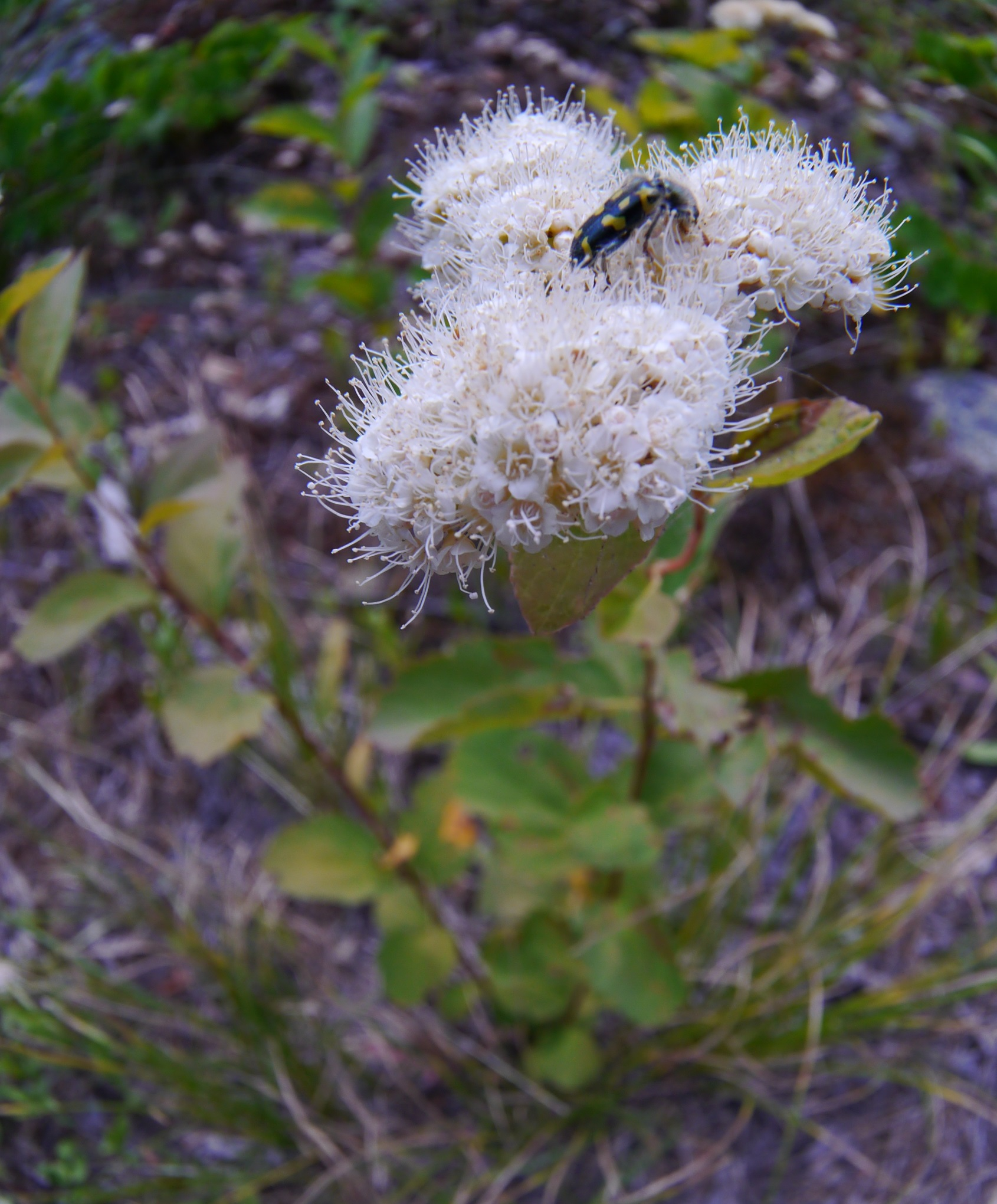
- In bloom in Icicle Canyon, Washington state
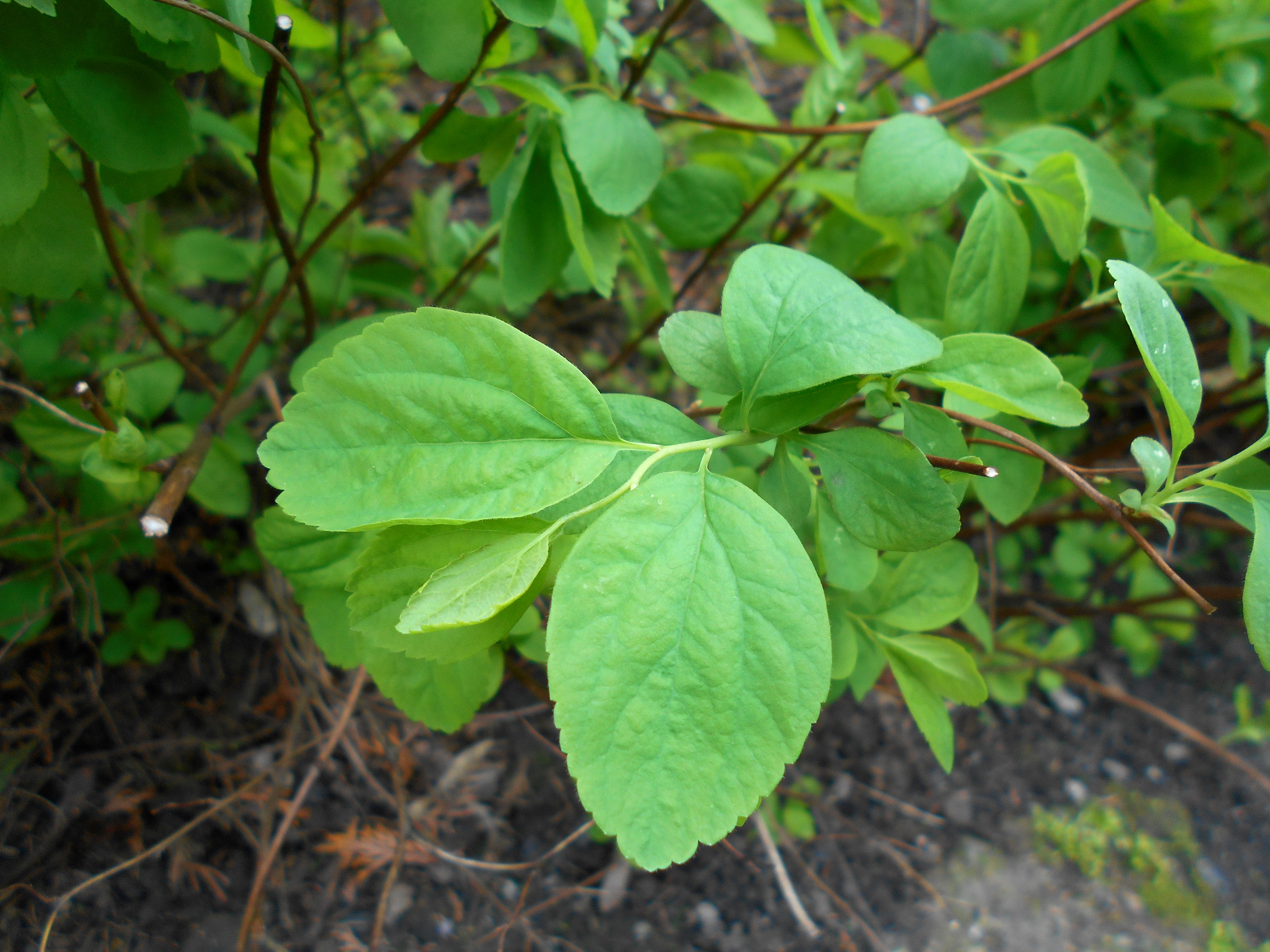
- Foliage

Scientific classification
- Kingdom: Plantae
- Clade: Tracheophytes
- Clade: Angiosperms
- Clade: Eudicots
- Clade: Rosids
- Order: Rosales
- Family: Rosaceae
- Genus: Spiraea
- Species: S. lucida

Binomial name
- Spiraea lucida Douglas ex Greene

Synonyms
- Spiraea betulifolia var. lucida (Douglas ex Greene) C.L.Hitchc.; Spiraea betulifolia subsp. lucida (Douglas ex Greene) R.L.Taylor & MacBryde; Spiraea corymbosa f. lucida (Douglas ex Greene) Zabel

= Spiraea lucida =

Species of plant

Spiraea lucida, the shiny-leaf meadowsweet, is a species of flowering plant in the family Rosaceae, native to western Canada as far as Saskatchewan, and the northwestern United States as far as the Dakotas. In the past, due to its leaf morphology varying greatly because of the plants' tendency to die back to the ground in winter, it was considered a variety of Spiraea betulifolia, the white or birch-leaf meadowsweet.
