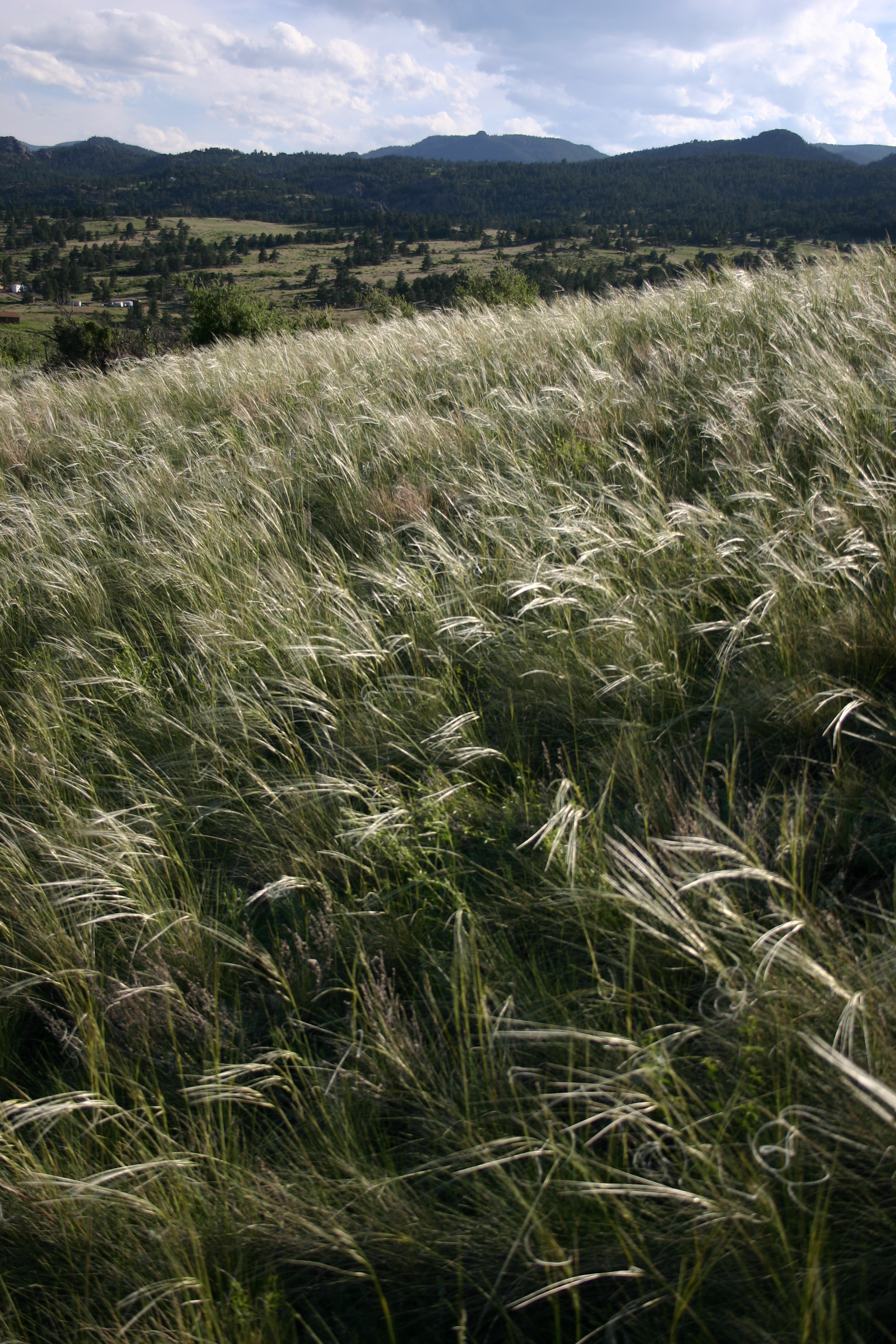

Scientific classification
- Kingdom: Plantae
- Clade: Tracheophytes
- Clade: Angiosperms
- Clade: Monocots
- Clade: Commelinids
- Order: Poales
- Family: Poaceae
- Subfamily: Pooideae
- Genus: Hesperostipa
- Species: H. comata

Binomial name
- Hesperostipa comata (Trin. & Rupr.) Barkworth

Synonyms
- Stipa comata

= Hesperostipa comata =

Species of flowering plant

Hesperostipa comata, commonly known as needle-and-thread grass, is a species of grass native to North America, especially the western third. It has a wide distribution spanning from northern Canada to Mexico.

== Description ==
Hesperostipa comata is a perennial bunchgrass producing erect, unbranched stems to about 1 m (3 ft 3 in) in maximum height. The narrow inflorescence is up to 28 cm (11 in) long in taller plants, with the mature spikelet bearing a spiraling, hairy, spear-shaped awn up to 19 cm (7 1/2 in) in length.

The seeds of this grass have hygroscopic extensions that bend with changes in humidity, enabling them to disperse over the ground. Each seed has an awn that twists several turns when the seed is released. Increased moisture causes it to untwist, and, upon drying, to twist again, thus the seed is drilled into the ground.

== Habitat ==
This is a grass of many habitat types, from grassland to pine forest. Young shoots provide a favored food source for black-tailed prairie dogs and black-tailed jackrabbits, and the grass is a good early spring graze for livestock before it develops its long, sharp awn.

== Cultural ==
This species was described by the explorers during the Lewis and Clark Expedition.

Needle and thread grass is the provincial grass of the prairie province of Saskatchewan. This species is popular among children because of the seed's ability to be thrown and stick to clothing.

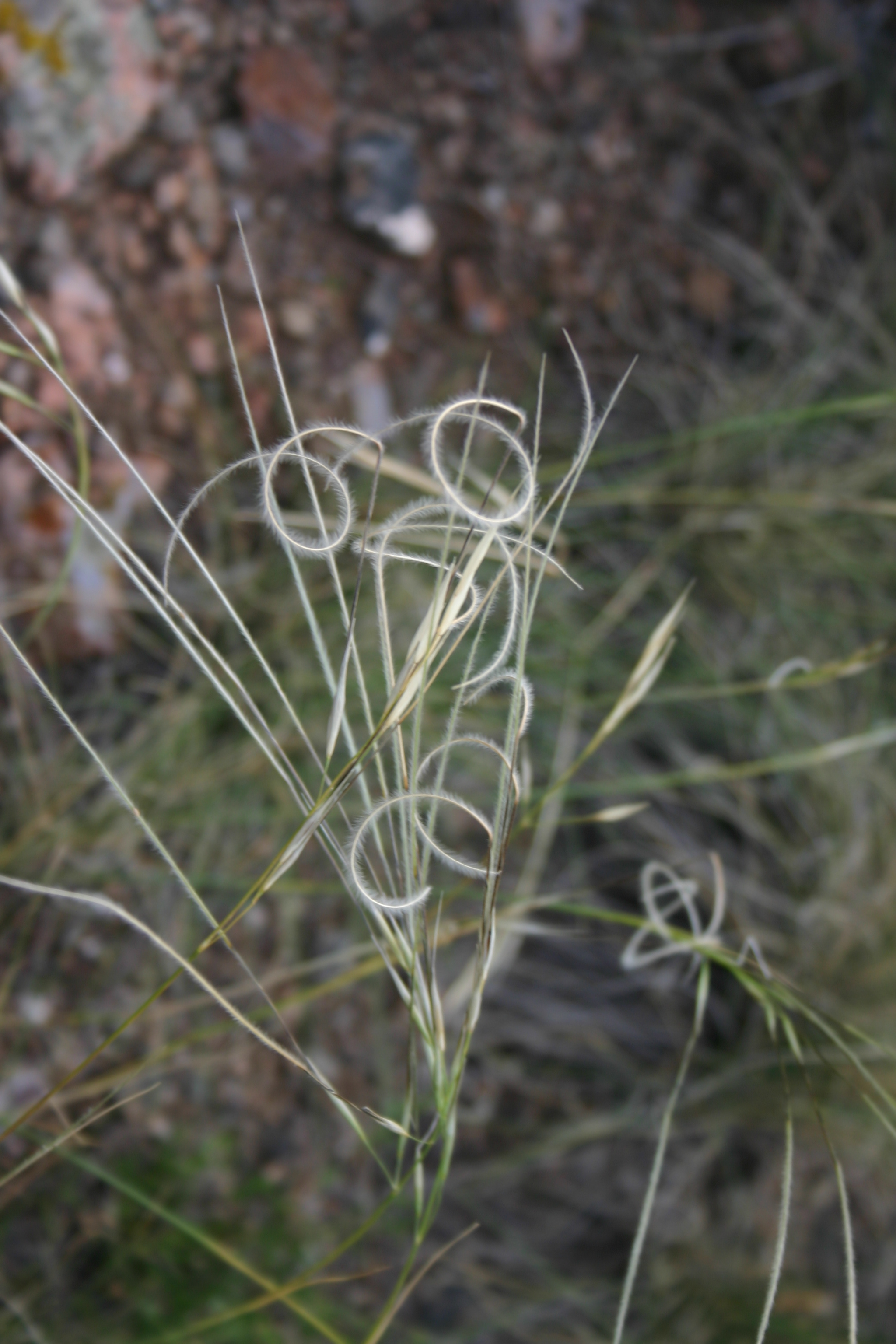

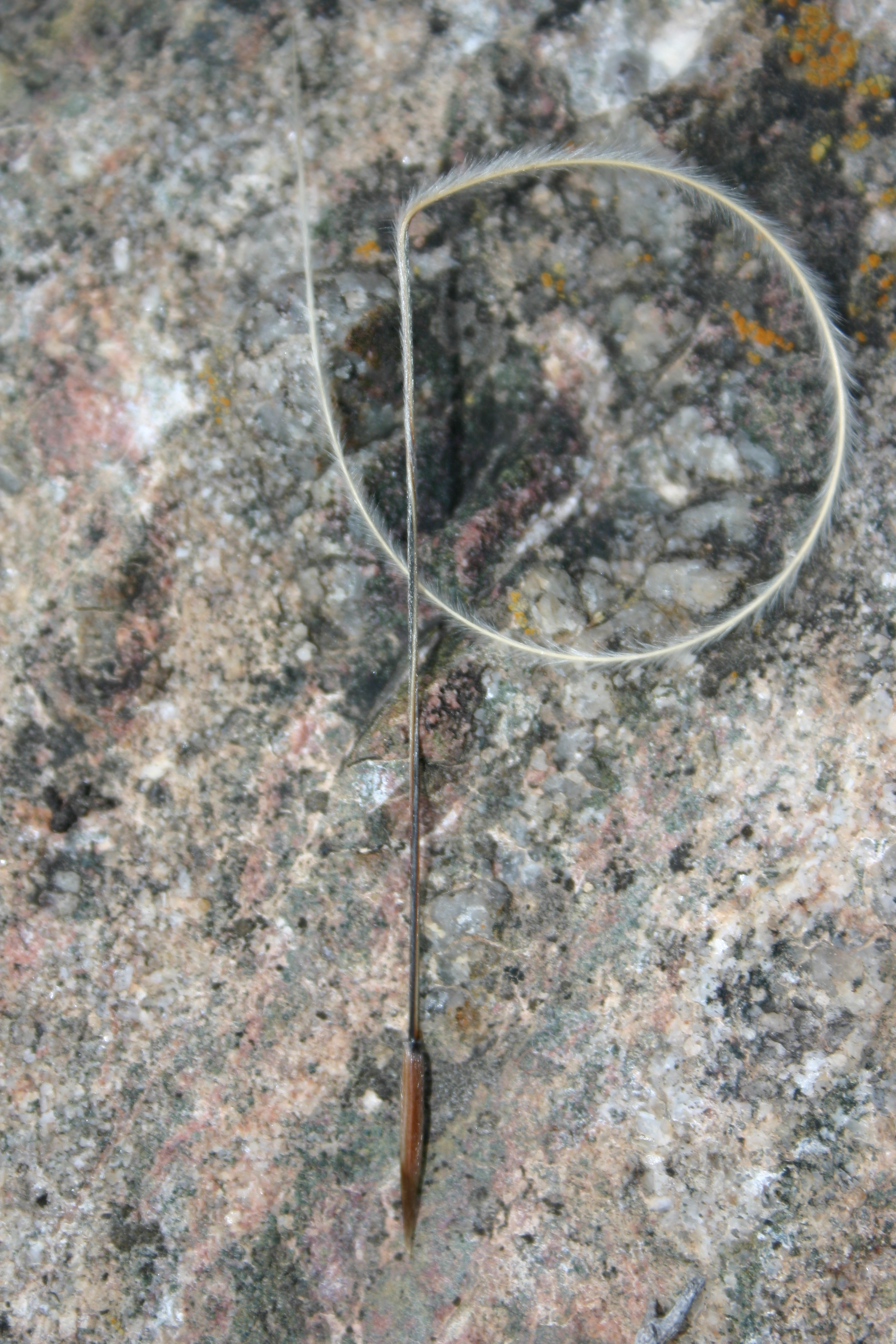
