= Mary Barkworth =

Expert in grasses

Mary E. Barkworth
- Born: 1941 (age 84–85); Marlborough, Wiltshire, England
- Education: Washington State University, Western Washington University, University of British Columbia
- Known for: Manual of Grasses for North America, Flora of North America (Volumes 24 and 25)
- Scientific career
- Fields: Botany, plant systematics
- Thesis: Intraspecific variation in Brodiaea douglasii watson, liliaceae (1975)
- Author abbrev. (botany): Barkworth

Mary Elizabeth Barkworth (born 1941, Marlborough, England) is an American botanist and professor emerita at Utah State University in Logan, Utah.

== Education and career ==
Barkworth has a B.Sc. from the University of British Columbia, and went on to teach school in British Columbia after graduation. She has an M.Ed. and a Ph.D. in 1975 from Western Washington University where she worked on variation in Brodiaea. Following her Ph.D. she worked with Agriculture Canada until moving to Utah State University in 1979, where she also served as the director of the Intermountain Herbarium. Barkworth retired in 2012.

Barkworth is known for her work on grasses, particularly members of the Stipeae and Triticeae. She also had responsibility for production of the two grass volumes in the Flora of North America. Barkworth has worked to digitize collections at OpenHerbarium.org, which includes collections from Pakistan and Somaliland. In 2013 Barkworth established a collaboration with the Daggett County Jail whereby inmates helped catalogue specimens through a collaboration between the herbarium and the jail.

== Selected publications ==
- R., Soderstrom, Thomas (1988). Grass systematics and evolution: an international symposium held at the Smithsonian Institution, Washington, D.C., July 27-31, 1986. Thomas R. Soderstrom, Khidir W. Hilu, Christopher S. Campbell, Mary E. Barkworth. Smithsonian Institution Press. ISBN 0-87474-300-1. OCLC 869053991.
- Barkworth, Mary E.; Talbott Roché, Cindy (2007). Manual of grasses for North America. Logan, Utah: Intermountain Herbarium and Utah State University Press. ISBN 978-0-87421-778-0. OCLC 659579715.
- Flora of North America: north of Mexico. Flora of North America Editorial Committee. New York. 1993. ISBN 0-19-505713-9. OCLC 26803793.
