= List of Sorbus species =

The following species are recognised in the genus Sorbus, many of which are called rowans or mountain-ashes: This list follows a narrow definition of genus Sorbus; species that have been moved to the genera Aria, Torminalis, Cormus, Chamaemespilus, Hedlundia, Scandosorbus, Karpatiosorbus, Mayovskya and Normeyera are not listed.

- Sorbus albopilosa T.T.Yu & L.T.Lu
- Sorbus americana Marshall
- Sorbus amoena McAll.
- Sorbus arachnoidea Koehne
- Sorbus aucuparia L.
- Sorbus bissetii McAll.
- Sorbus bulleyana McAll.
- Sorbus californica Greene
- Sorbus carmesina McAll.
- Sorbus cashmiriana Hedl.
- Sorbus cibagouensis H.Peng & Z.J.Yin
- Sorbus cinereopubescens McAll.
- Sorbus commixta Hedl.
- Sorbus coxii McAll.
- Sorbus decora (Sarg.) C.K.Schneid.
- Sorbus discolor (Maxim.) Maxim.
- Sorbus dolichofoliolatus X.F.Gao & Meng Li
- Sorbus domugledica Kárpáti
- Sorbus doshonglaensis Xin Chen, Xiao C.Zhang & C.Q.Tang
- Sorbus eburnea McAll.
- Sorbus ellipsoidalis McAll.
- Sorbus erzincanica Dönmez
- Sorbus esserteauana Koehne
- Sorbus fansipanensis McAll.
- Sorbus faohraei Hedrén & J.Levin
- Sorbus filipes Hand.-Mazz.
- Sorbus foliolosa (Wall.) Spach
- Sorbus forrestii McAll. & Gillham
- Sorbus frutescens McAll.
- Sorbus gilgitana McAll.
- Sorbus glabriuscula McAll.
- Sorbus glomerulata Koehne
- Sorbus gonggashanica McAll.
- Sorbus gongshanensis X.F.Gao & Meng Li
- Sorbus gracilis (Siebold & Zucc.) K.Koch
- Sorbus hajastana Gabrieljan
- Sorbus harrowiana (Balf.f. & W.W.Sm.) Rehder
- Sorbus helenae Koehne
- Sorbus herculis Kárpáti
- Sorbus himalaica Gabrieljan
- Sorbus hugh-mcallisteri Mikoláš
- Sorbus hupehensis C.K.Schneid.
- Sorbus insignis (Hook.f.) Hedl.
- Sorbus keenanii Rushforth
- Sorbus khumbuensis McAll.
- Sorbus kiukiangensis T.T.Yu
- Sorbus koehneana C.K.Schneid.
- Sorbus kongboensis McAll.
- Sorbus kurzii (G.Watt ex Prain) C.K.Schneid.
- Sorbus kusnetzovii Zinserl.
- Sorbus lanpingensis L.T.Lu
- Sorbus lingshiensis Rushforth
- Sorbus longii Rushforth
- Sorbus lushanensis Xin Chen & Jing Qiu
- Sorbus macallisteri Rushforth
- Sorbus macrantha Merr.
- Sorbus maderensis (Lowe) Dode
- Sorbus matsumurana (Makino) Koehne
- Sorbus microphylla Wenz.
- Sorbus monbeigii (Cardot) N.P.Balakr.
- Sorbus muliensis McAll.
- Sorbus obsoletidentata (Cardot) T.T.Yu
- Sorbus occidentalis (S.Watson) Greene
- Sorbus oligodonta (Cardot) Hand.-Mazz.
- Sorbus olivacea McAll.
- Sorbus ovalis McAll.
- Sorbus parva McAll.
- Sorbus parvifolia (Blatt.) N.P.Balakr.
- Sorbus parvifructa McAll.
- Sorbus pontica Zaik.
- Sorbus poteriifolia Hand.-Mazz.
- Sorbus prattii Koehne
- Sorbus × proctoriana T.C.G.Rich
- Sorbus pseudohupehensis McAll.
- Sorbus pseudovilmorinii McAll.
- Sorbus randaiensis (Hayata) Koidz.
- Sorbus reducta Diels
- Sorbus rehderiana Koehne
- Sorbus rinzenii Rushforth
- Sorbus rockii P.D.Sell
- Sorbus rosea McAll.
- Sorbus rubescens McAll.
- Sorbus rufopilosa C.K.Schneid.
- Sorbus rushforthii McAll.
- Sorbus rutilans McAll.
- Sorbus sambucifolia (Cham. & Schltdl.) M.Roem.
- Sorbus sargentiana Koehne
- Sorbus scalaris Koehne
- Sorbus scopulina Greene
- Sorbus setschwanensis (C.K.Schneid.) Koehne
- Sorbus shirinensis Hadač & Chrtek
- Sorbus sitchensis M.Roem.
- Sorbus splendens Grimshaw & C.R.Sanders
- Sorbus subfusca (Ledeb. ex Nordm.) Boiss.
- Sorbus sujoyi Ghora
- Sorbus tenuis McAll.
- Sorbus tianschanica Rupr.
- Sorbus tiantangensis X.M.Liu & C.L.Wang
- Sorbus tiliifolia H.Zare, Amini & Assadi
- Sorbus ulleungensis Chin S.Chang
- Sorbus ursina (Wall. ex G.Don) S.Schauer
- Sorbus vilmorinii C.K.Schneid.
- Sorbus wallichii (Hook.f.) T.T.Yu
- Sorbus wilsoniana C.K.Schneid.
- Sorbus × yokouchii M.Mizush. ex T.Shimizu
- Sorbus zayuensis T.T.Yu & L.T.Lu
