= Sorbus dumosa =

Sorbus dumosa may refer to several different species of plants:

- Sorbus dumosa House, a synonym for Sorbus decora, northern mountain ash
- Sorbus dumosa Greene, a synonym for Sorbus scopulina, Greene's mountain-ash
- Sorbus dumosa G.N.Jones, an unplaced species of plant that cannot be brought into synonymy
