= Pyrus sambucifolia =

Pyrus sambucifolia may refer to several different species of plants:

- Pyrus sambucifolia Cham. & Schltdl., a synonym for Sorbus sambucifolia, Siberian mountain ash
- Pyrus sambucifolia S.Watson & J.M.Coult., a synonym for Sorbus decora, northern mountain ash
- Pyrus sambucifolia Bong., a synonym for Sorbus sitchensis, Sitka mountain-ash
- Pyrus sambucifolia W.H.Brewer & S.Watson, an unplaced species of plant that cannot be brought into synonymy
