= Sorbus fruticosa =

Sorbus fruticosa may refer to two different plant species:

- Sorbus fruticosa Crantz, a synonym for Chamaemespilus alpina
- Sorbus fruticosa Steud., a synonym for Chamaemespilus alpina
- Sorbus fruticosa McAll., a synonym for Sorbus koehneana
