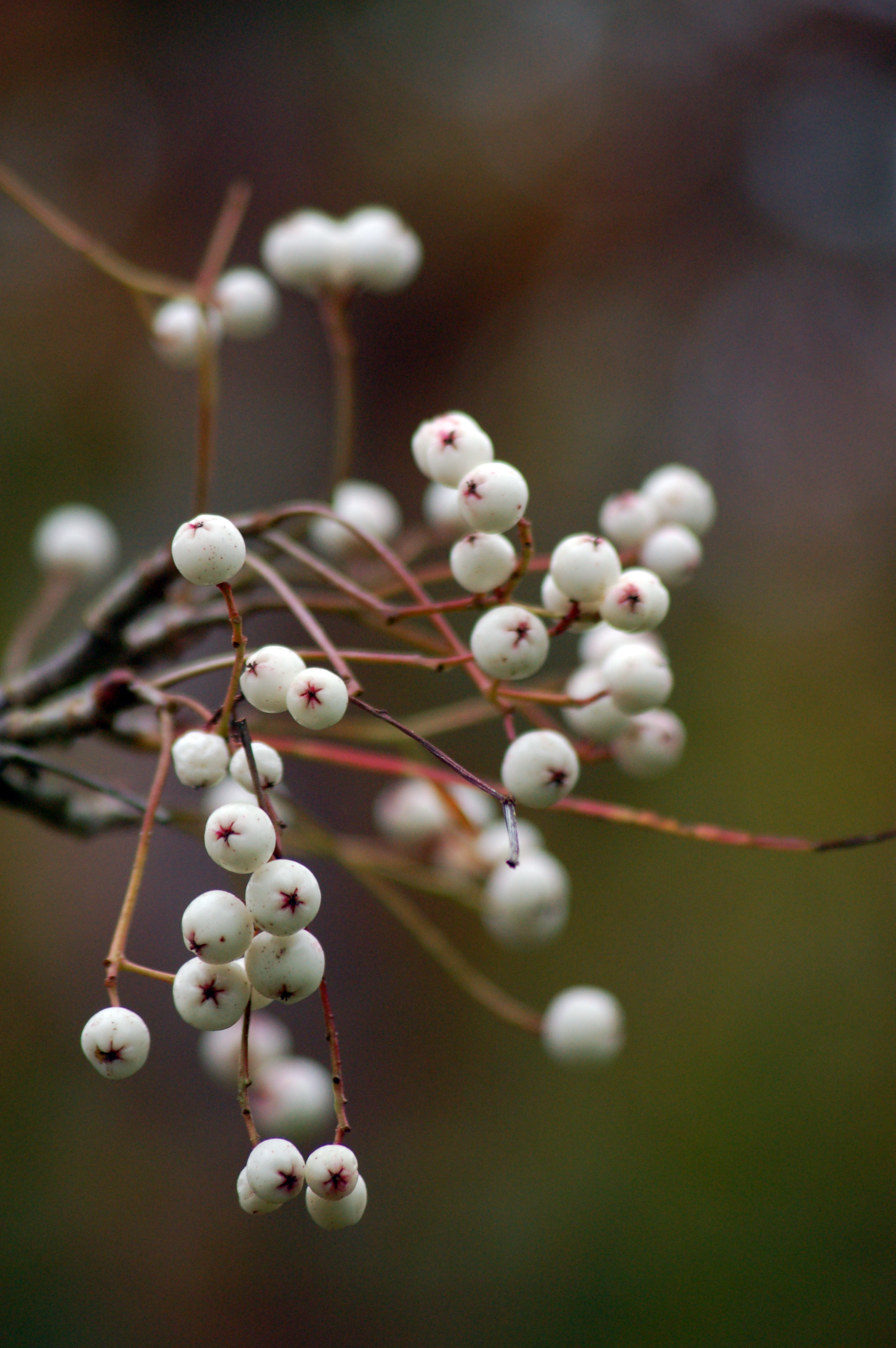
- Sorbus pseudovilmorinii berries

Scientific classification
- Kingdom: Plantae
- Clade: Tracheophytes
- Clade: Angiosperms
- Clade: Eudicots
- Clade: Rosids
- Order: Rosales
- Family: Rosaceae
- Genus: Sorbus
- Species: S. pseudovilmorinii

Binomial name
- Sorbus pseudovilmorinii McAll.

Synonyms
- Pyrus pseudovilmorinii (McAll.) M.F.Fay & Christenh.

= Sorbus pseudovilmorinii =

Species of plant

Sorbus pseudovilmorinii is a species of variable deciduous flowering tree.

== Description ==
- Height: Ultimate height of 4 meters to 7.5 meters.
- Leaves: Pinnate, with a fern-like appearance.
- Flowers: White.
- Fruit: Variable, often crimson in color, becoming white or white with crimson flecks as it reaches maturity, typically by October.

== Etymology ==
Sorbus is the ancient Latin name for the fruit of the service tree, Sorbus. ‘Service’ and ‘Sorbus’ are cognates.

Pseudovilmorinii means ‘false vilmorinii’.

== Distribution and habitat ==
Native to northern Vietnam, Tibet, and western China, including Yunnan province, from whence the most attractive specimens can be found.

Grows in mountains, forest scrub, or coniferous or mixed forests.

Prefers a sunny or partially shaded site with free-draining soil. Dislikes heavy clay soils.

== Cultivation ==
Sorbus pseudovilmorinii is the parent of several Sorbus hybrids.
