= Sorbus khumbuensis =

Scientific classification
- Kingdom: Plantae
- Clade: Tracheophytes
- Clade: Angiosperms
- Clade: Eudicots
- Clade: Rosids
- Order: Rosales
- Family: Rosaceae
- Genus: Sorbus
- Species: S. khumbuensis

Binomial name
- Sorbus khumbuensis McAll.

Synonyms
- Pyrus khumbuensis (McAll.) M.F.Fay & Christenh.

Species of flowering plant

Sorbus khumbuensis is a species of rowan in the family Rosaceae. It is part of the Sorbus microphylla aggregate with crimson fruits, turning white. It has small long-oval shaped leaves with 12-19 pairs of leaflets per leaf. It is native to eastern Nepal, and is named after the Khumbu area. This plant is cultivated in parks and gardens as an ornamental plant.
