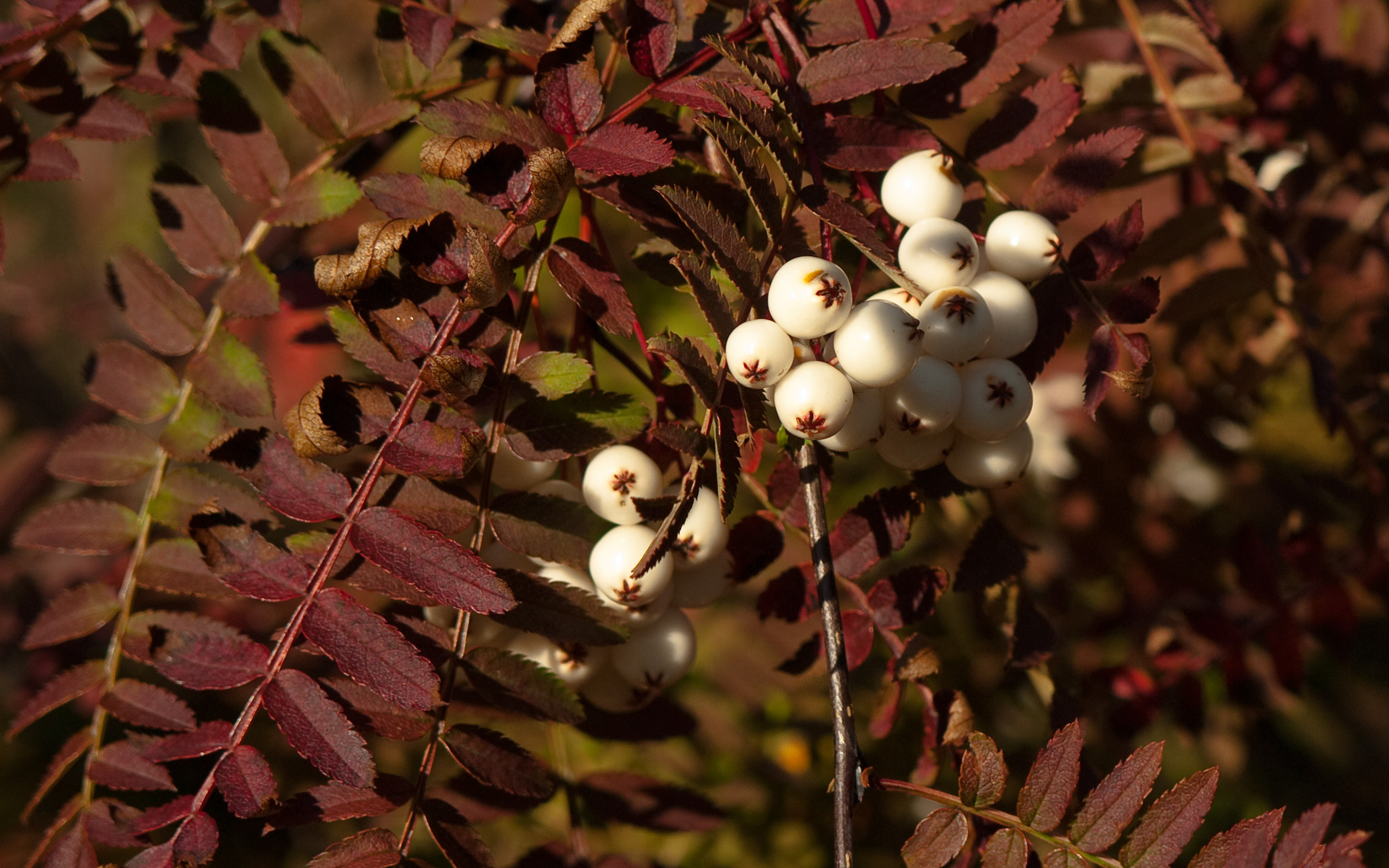
- Fruit with Autumn foliage

Scientific classification
- Kingdom: Plantae
- Clade: Embryophytes
- Clade: Tracheophytes
- Clade: Spermatophytes
- Clade: Angiosperms
- Clade: Eudicots
- Clade: Rosids
- Order: Rosales
- Family: Rosaceae
- Genus: Sorbus
- Species: S. frutescens

Binomial name
- Sorbus frutescens McAll.

Synonyms
- Pyrus frutescens (McAll.) M.F.Fay & Christenh.

= Sorbus frutescens =

Species of flowering plant

Sorbus frutescens is a species of rowan native to Gansu province of China. Often mistakenly lumped in with Sorbus koehneana, it is a very small tree reaching only 2 m (6 ft 7 in) at maturity, with white fruit against dark green pinnate leaves which turn shades of red and bronze in autumn.

It has gained the Royal Horticultural Society's Award of Garden Merit as an ornamental.

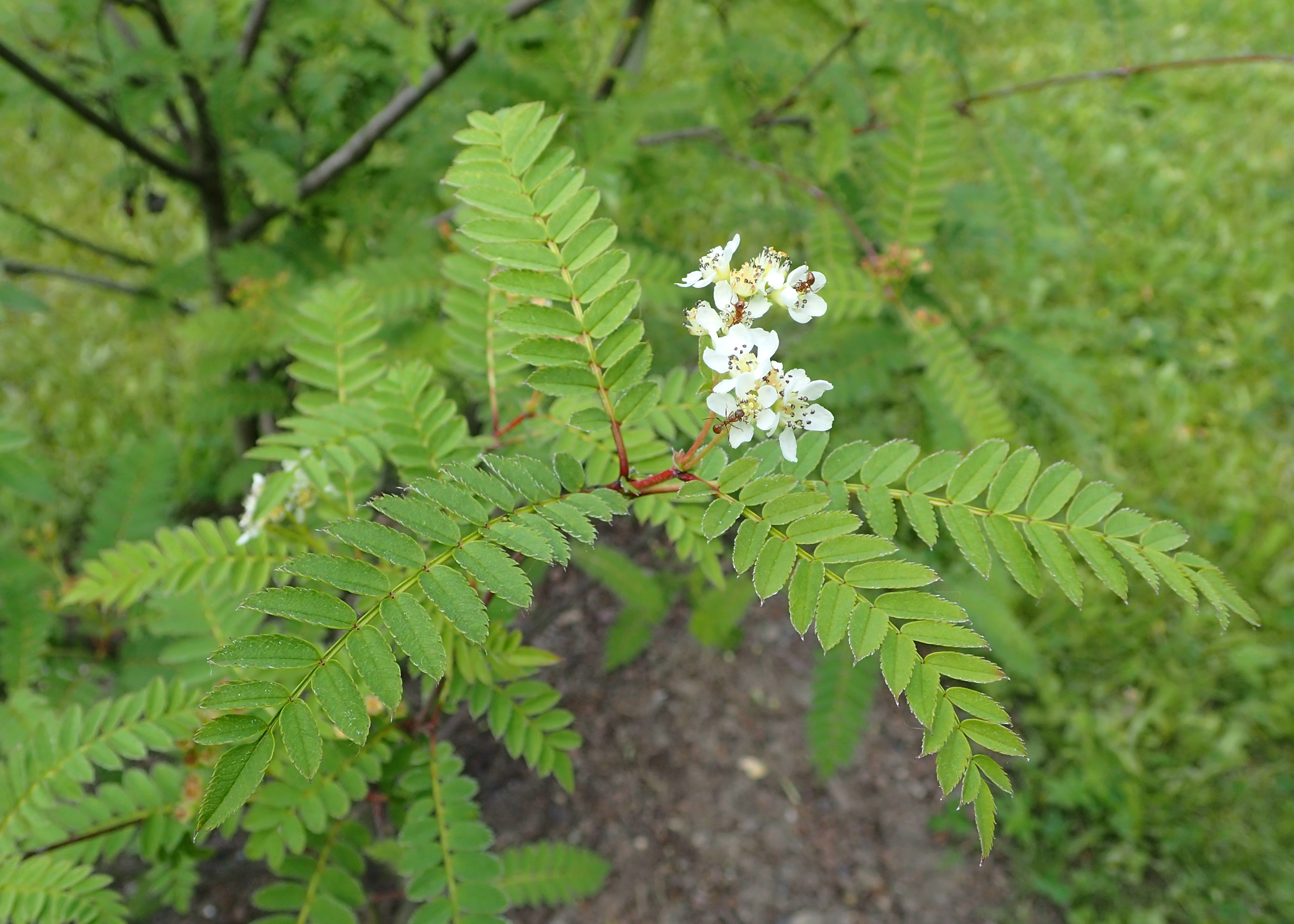

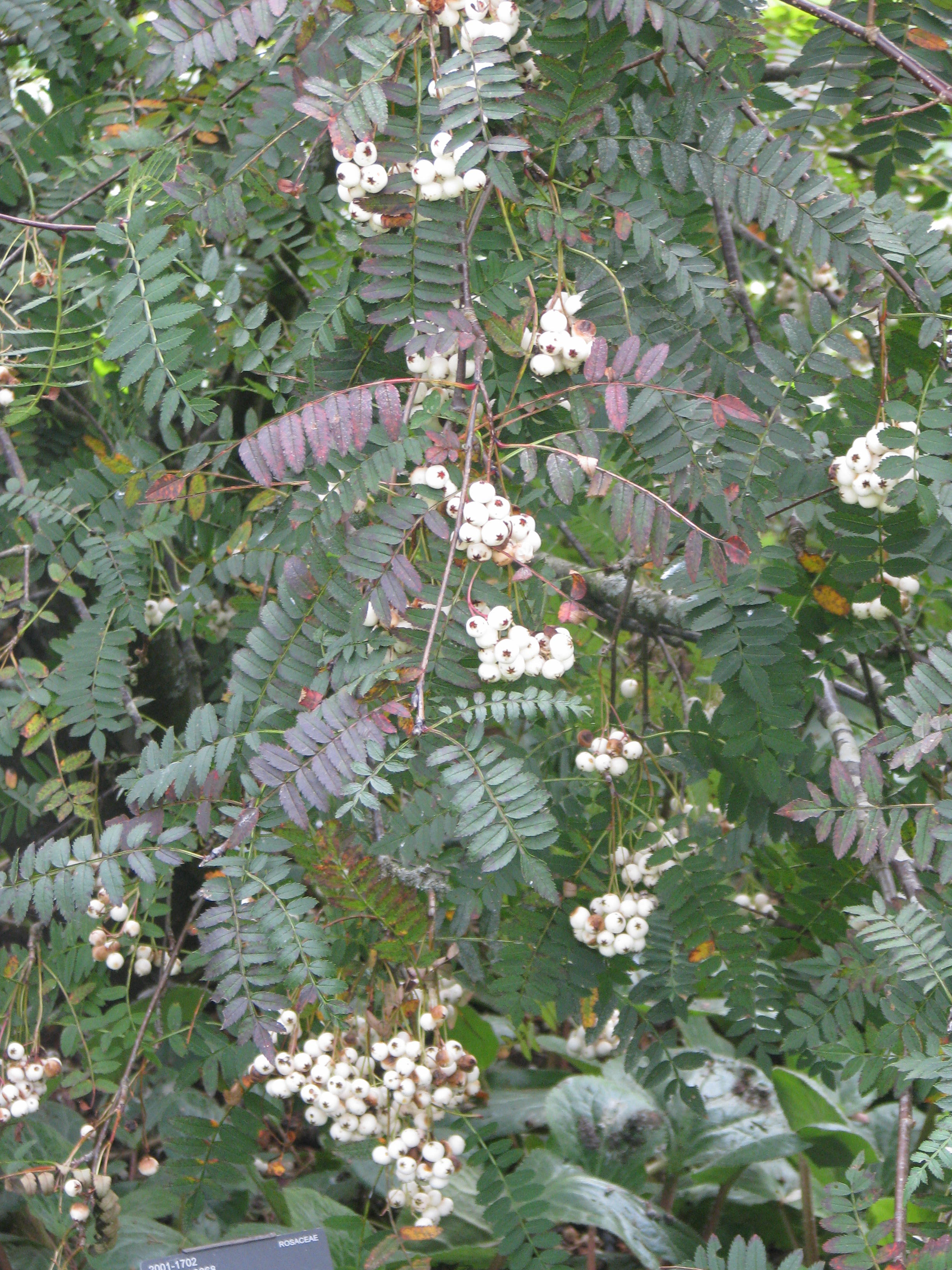
