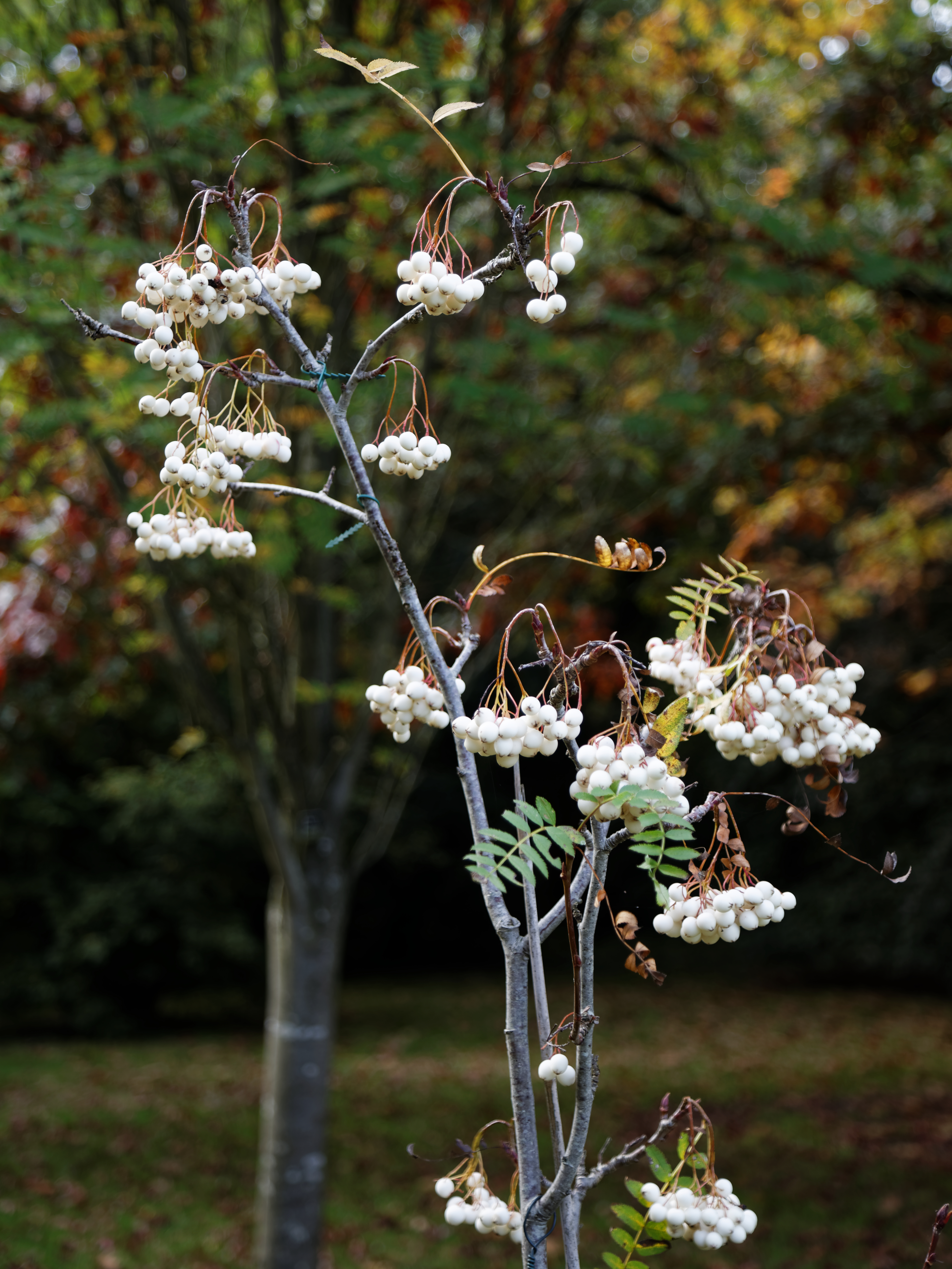
- In October

Scientific classification
- Kingdom: Plantae
- Clade: Tracheophytes
- Clade: Angiosperms
- Clade: Eudicots
- Clade: Rosids
- Order: Rosales
- Family: Rosaceae
- Genus: Sorbus
- Species: S. cashmiriana

Binomial name
- Sorbus cashmiriana Hedl.

= Sorbus cashmiriana =

Species of plant

Sorbus cashmiriana, the Kashmir rowan, is a species of flowering plant in the family Rosaceae, native to the western Himalayas, including Kashmir.

It is a small, usually short-lived deciduous tree growing to 6–8 m (20–26 ft), with a trunk up to 25 cm (10 in) in diameter. The bark is smooth grey or red-grey. The leaves are 15–23 cm (6–9 in) long, pinnate, with 15–21 leaflets, dark green on top and lighter green underneath, the petiole reddish, the leaflets 3–5.5 cm (1–2 in) long and 1.5–2 cm broad, with serrated margins. The flowers are 7–10 mm in diameter, with five very pale pink petals and pale yellowish stamens, produced in corymbs in the spring. Pollination is by insects. The fruit is a white to whitish-pink pome 12–15 mm in diameter, ripening in the autumn and often persisting long after the leaf fall into winter.

== Cultivation ==
It is a popular ornamental tree, grown for its clusters of white fruit. It has gained the Royal Horticultural Society's Award of Garden Merit.
