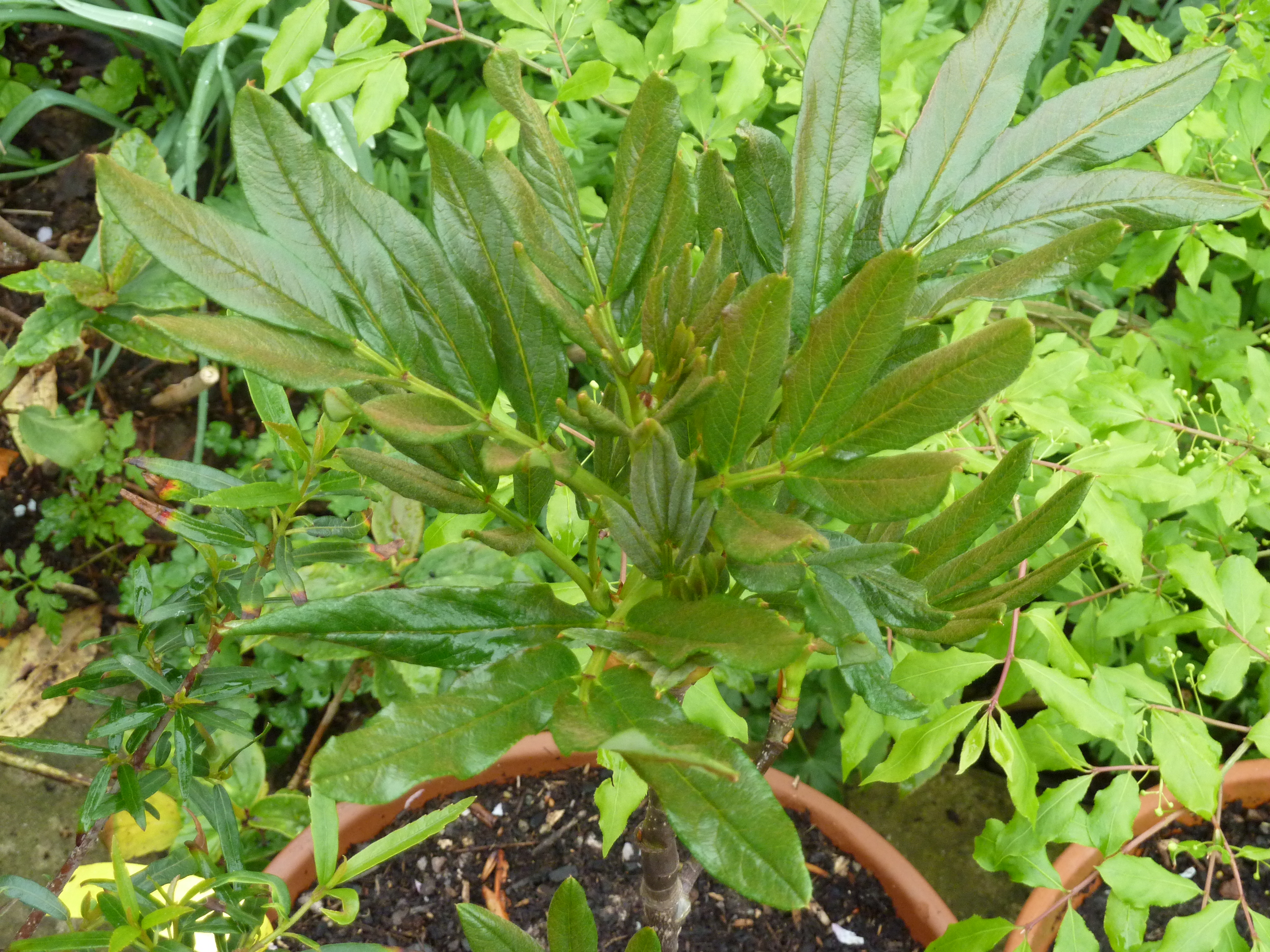

Scientific classification
- Kingdom: Plantae
- Clade: Tracheophytes
- Clade: Angiosperms
- Clade: Eudicots
- Clade: Rosids
- Order: Rosales
- Family: Rosaceae
- Genus: Sorbus
- Species: S. harrowiana

Binomial name
- Sorbus harrowiana (Balf.f. & W.W.Sm.) Rehder

Synonyms
- Pyrus harrowiana Balf.f. & W.W.Sm.

= Sorbus harrowiana =

Species of plant

Sorbus harrowiana, commonly known as Harrow rowan, is a species of rowan. It is cultivated as an ornamental plant in parks and gardens.
