= Sorbus californica =

Scientific classification
- Kingdom: Plantae
- Clade: Tracheophytes
- Clade: Angiosperms
- Clade: Eudicots
- Clade: Rosids
- Order: Rosales
- Family: Rosaceae
- Genus: Sorbus
- Section: Sorbus sect. Commixtae
- Species: S. californica

Binomial name
- Sorbus californica Greene

Synonyms
- S. cascadensis G.N.Jones

Species of plant

Sorbus californica, the California mountain ash, is an aggregate species of rowans. It forms a tree or bush with compound leaves (many leaflets) that are toothed almost from base to apex. It produces orange-red fruit. It is often confused with the western North American species S. sitchensis, which has leaflets with few teeth and pinkish fruit.

The species is native to western North America. It is found in the mountains of California as the name suggests, but is not an ash. It is sometimes cultivated.

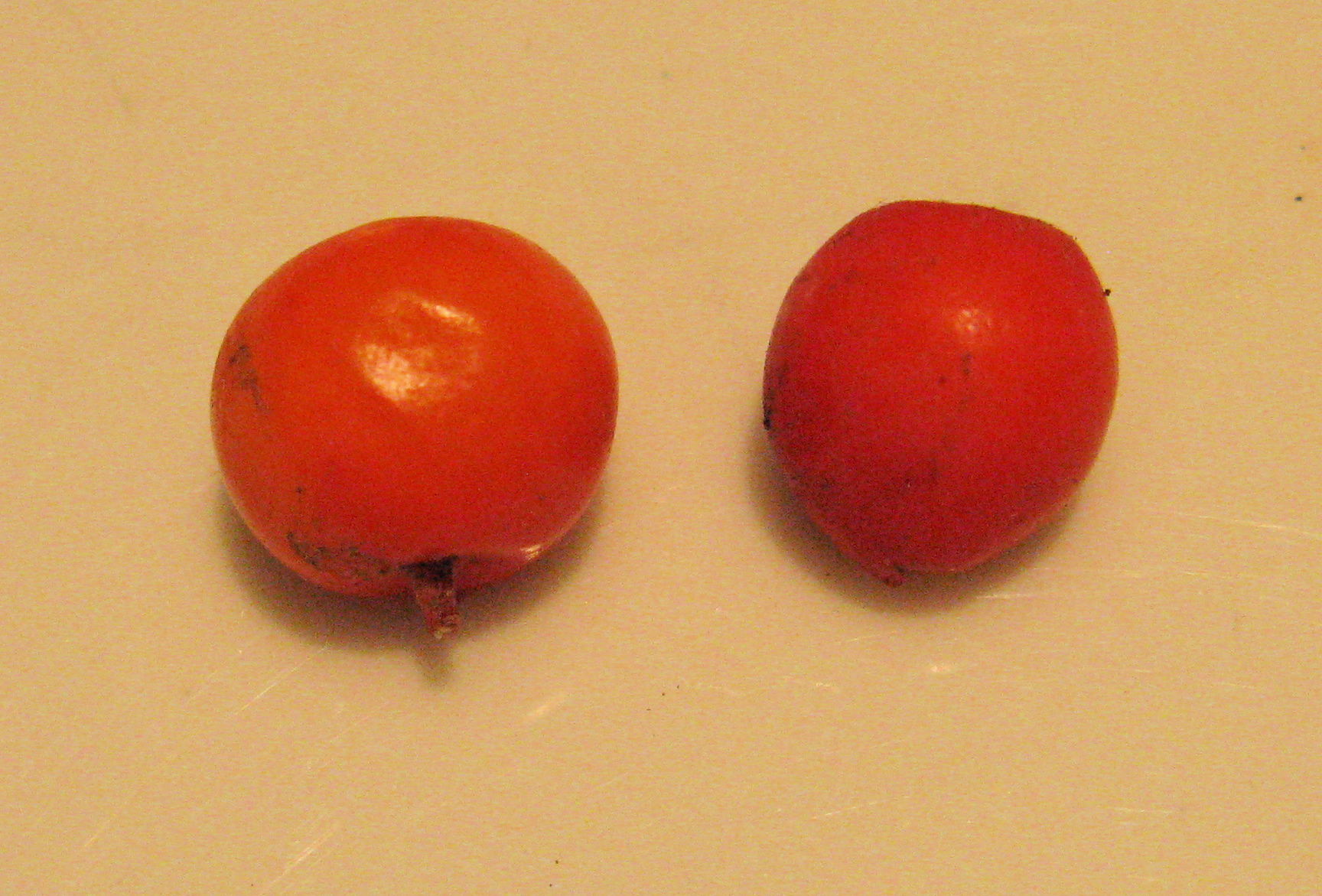
S. californica fruits (left) are apple-shaped while those of S. aucuparia (right) are conical at the stem end.

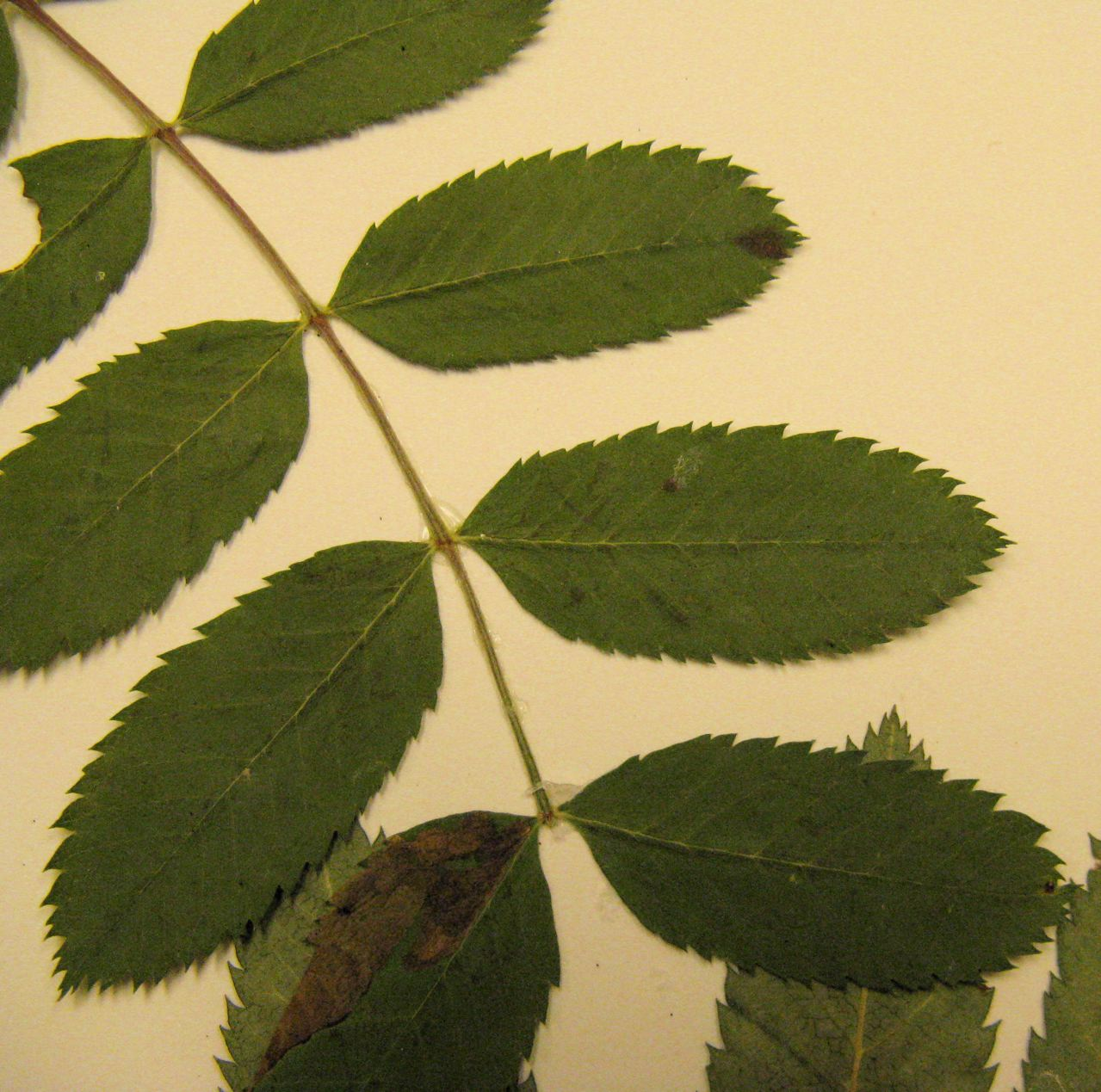
The individual leaflets are toothed almost from base to apex.
