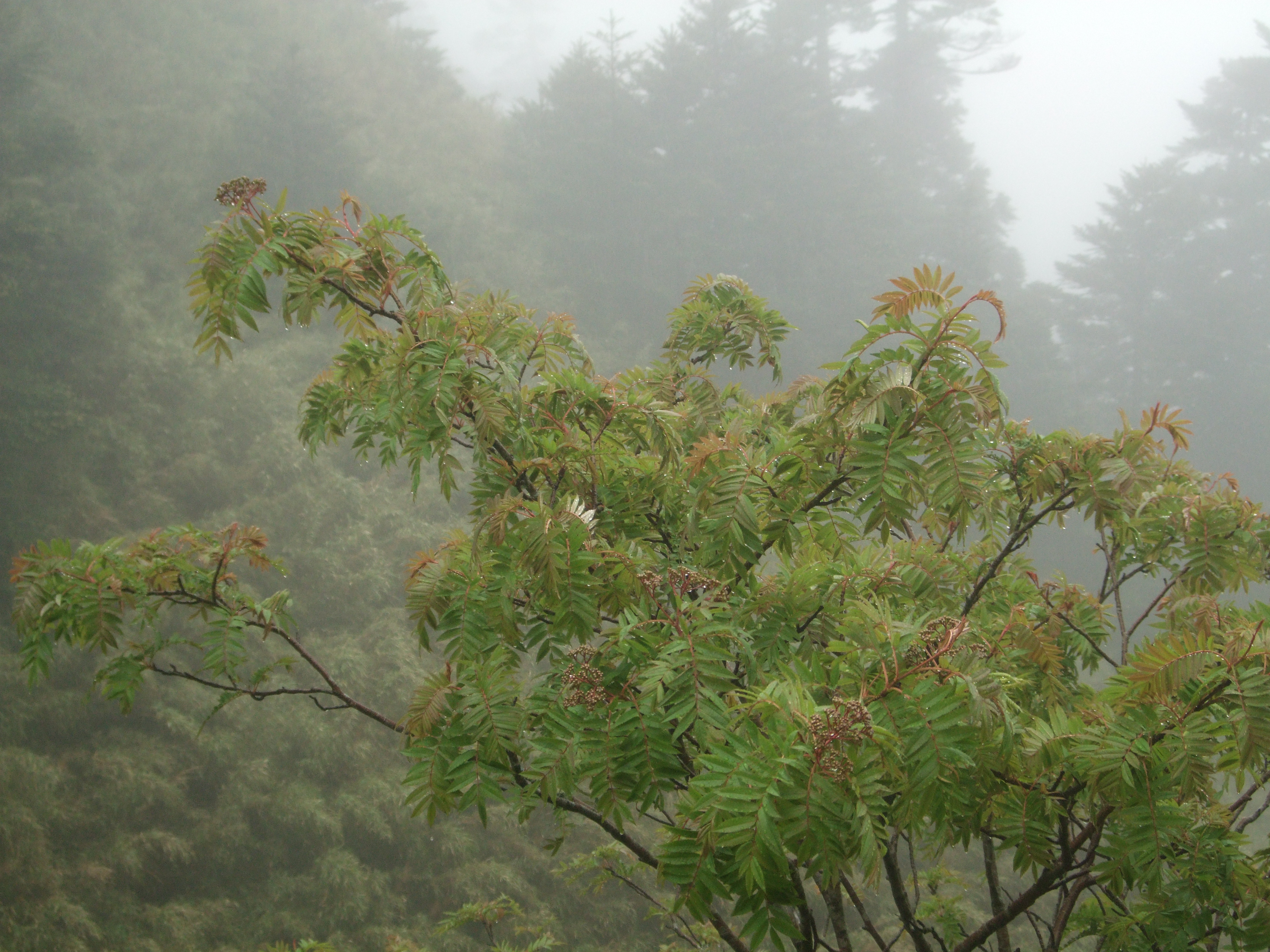

Scientific classification
- Kingdom: Plantae
- Clade: Tracheophytes
- Clade: Angiosperms
- Clade: Eudicots
- Clade: Rosids
- Order: Rosales
- Family: Rosaceae
- Genus: Sorbus
- Species: S. randaiensis

Binomial name
- Sorbus randaiensis (Hayata) Koidz.

Synonyms
- List: Pyrus aucuparia var. randaiensis Hayata; Pyrus randaiensis (Hayata) Hayata; Pyrus aucuparia var. trilocularis Hayata; Pyrus trilocularis Hayata; Sorbus rufoferruginea var. trilocularis (Hayata) Koidz.; Sorbus trilocularis (Hayata) Masam.

= Sorbus randaiensis =

Species of plant

Sorbus randaiensis is a species of deciduous tree in the family Rosaceae. It is endemic to the mountain areas of central Taiwan, with altitude 1,800m to 3,200m, mostly spotted in the forest of Xueshan, Hehuan Mountain, Mount Xiluan, and Nenggao Mountain. It is a tree 3–8 m tall with white flowers and reddish fruit.

== Naming ==
It was first described as Pyrus aucuparia var. randaiensis by Bunzō Hayata in 1911, then placed in Sorbus by Gen'ichi Koidzumi in 1913.

Its species epithet randaiensis implies that the first type specimen was collected at Mount Xiluan. (Note: Apparently based on the Japanese pronunciation of the character 巒.)

== Description ==
Deciduous trees with obvious lenticel on the branches.

=== Leaf ===
Alternate, odd number pinnate leaves, with leaflets 15–21. Leaflets without petiole, shaped from long oval to lanceolate, 3–4 cm in length, 8–12 cm in width. The front end tapered, and the basal part skew, circled or obtuse. Margin jagged. Petiole with groove, and with short furs when young.

=== Flower ===
Terminal corymbs inflorescence. Pedicels are short, about 3–4 mm in length. Petals 5, white. Hypanthium with long furs, triangle shaped. Stamens 15–20, Carpels 3–5, isolated. Styles 3–5, isolated or basal synthetic. Flower perigynous.

=== Fruit ===
Schizocarp, berry-like, globular with diameter 7 mm. The front end has the remaining traces of stigma and calyx. Turn rubine at maturation.

== Phenology ==
First leaf for the spring sprouts during April to May. Inflorescence is on about May to June. Around September to October, their fruits ripen with rubine color. And in the October to November, their leaves turn yellow or red before falling down.

== Uses ==
=== Medicine ===
Its fruit, stem, and bark can be used as medicine. Although tasting bitter, it is a cure for chronic bronchitis and cough with phlegm, and is spleen-tonifying.

=== Ornamental ===
It is a branching tree that expands outwards, displaying it's flowers and branches.

=== Food ===
The fruits are with juicy texture and sweetness, tasting delicious.
