= Sorbus pseudohupehensis =

Scientific classification
- Kingdom: Plantae
- Clade: Embryophytes
- Clade: Tracheophytes
- Clade: Spermatophytes
- Clade: Angiosperms
- Clade: Eudicots
- Clade: Rosids
- Order: Rosales
- Family: Rosaceae
- Genus: Sorbus
- Species: S. pseudohupehensis

Binomial name
- Sorbus pseudohupehensis McAll.

Synonyms
- Pyrus pseudohupehensis (McAll.) M.F.Fay & Christenh.

Species of flowering plant

Sorbus pseudohupehensis, the Chinese mountain ash, is a species of rowan native to Yunnan province in China. Available from commercial suppliers under a variety of names, it has gained the Royal Horticultural Society's Award of Garden Merit as an ornamental.
