= Sorbus splendens =

Scientific classification
- Kingdom: Plantae
- Clade: Tracheophytes
- Clade: Angiosperms
- Clade: Eudicots
- Clade: Rosids
- Order: Rosales
- Family: Rosaceae
- Genus: Sorbus
- Species: S. splendens

Binomial name
- Sorbus splendens Grimshaw & C.R.Sanders

Species of tree

Sorbus splendens, is a species of tree in the family Rosaceae. It that grows to around 10 metres (33 ft) tall and occurs in mixed forests and on mountain slopes. Its native range to China, but has been introduced to the United Kingdom and North America as an ornamental plant.
