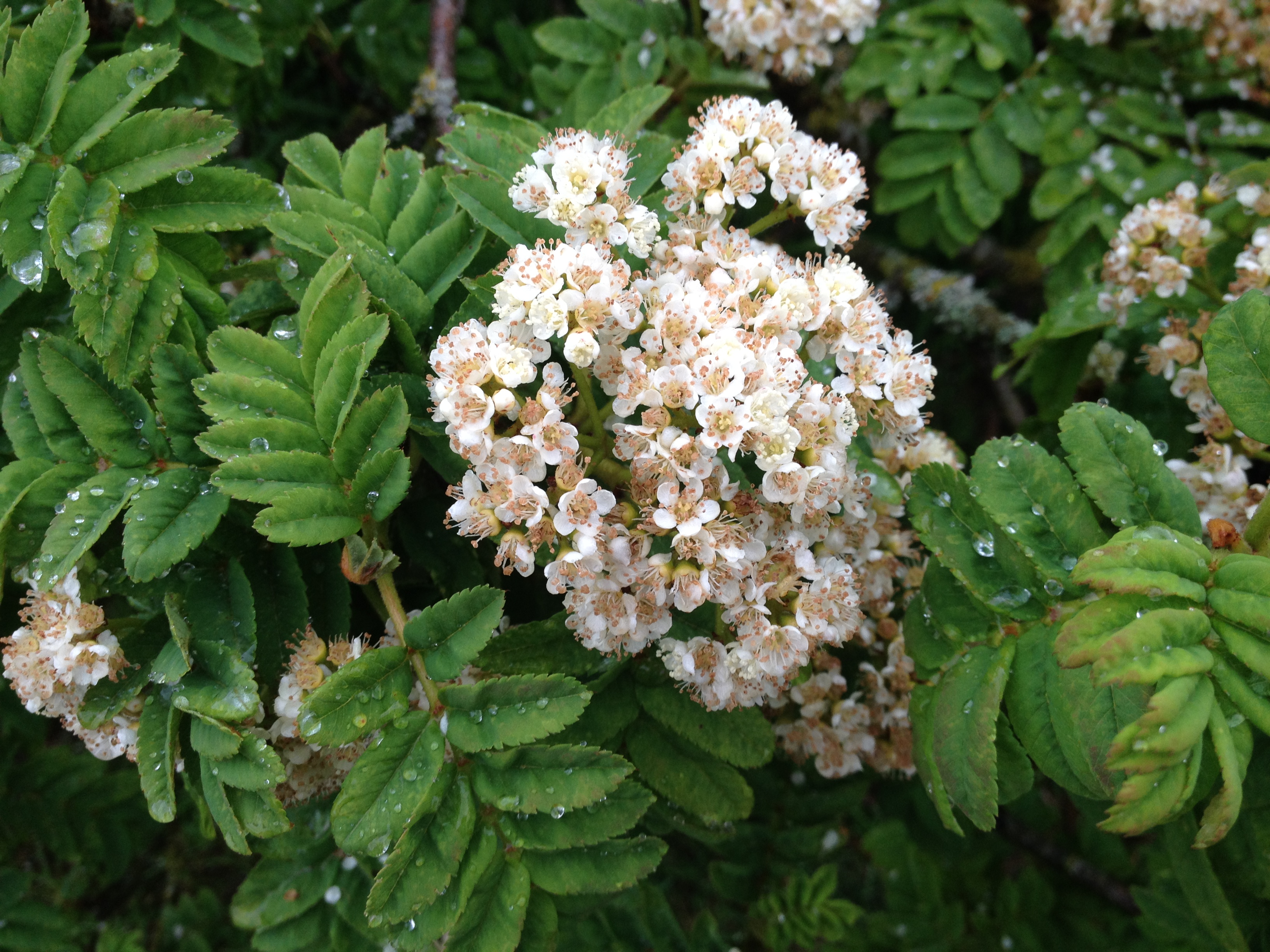

Conservation status
- Critically Endangered (IUCN 3.1)

Scientific classification
- Kingdom: Plantae
- Clade: Tracheophytes
- Clade: Angiosperms
- Clade: Eudicots
- Clade: Rosids
- Order: Rosales
- Family: Rosaceae
- Genus: Sorbus
- Species: S. maderensis

Binomial name
- Sorbus maderensis (Lowe) Dode

Synonyms
- List: Pyrus maderensis (Lowe) M.F.Fay & Christenh.; Sorbus aucuparia subsp. maderensis (Lowe) McAll.; Sorbus aucuparia var. maderensis Lowe; Pyrus aucuparia var. maderensis Lowe

= Sorbus maderensis =

Species of plant

Sorbus maderensis is a species of rowan in the family Rosaceae that is endemic to Madeira. It is threatened by habitat loss.

== Etymology ==
Sorbus is the Latin name for the fruit of the service tree. Maderensis means 'from Madeira'.
