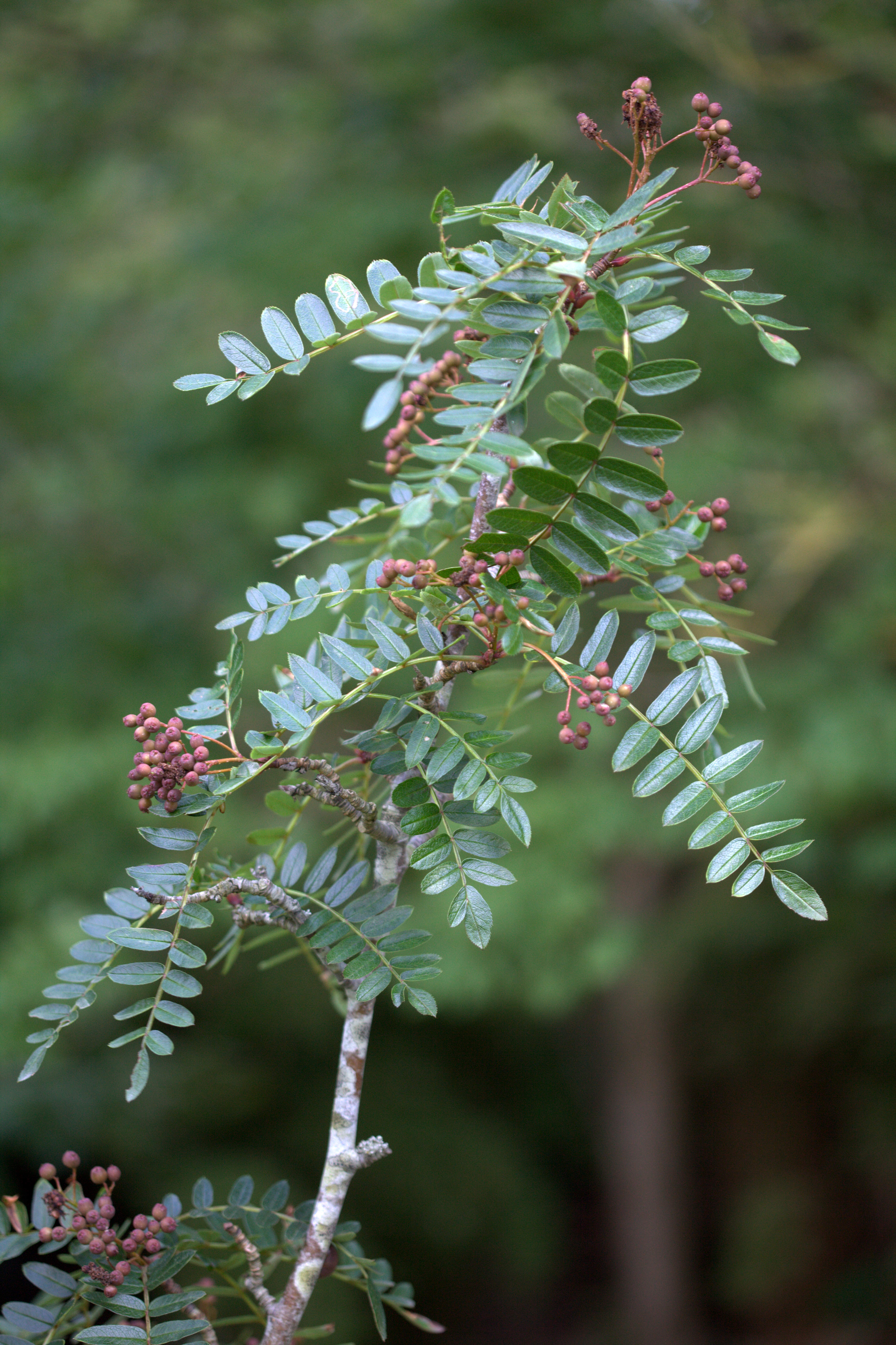

Conservation status
- Least Concern (IUCN 2.3)

Scientific classification
- Kingdom: Plantae
- Clade: Tracheophytes
- Clade: Angiosperms
- Clade: Eudicots
- Clade: Rosids
- Order: Rosales
- Family: Rosaceae
- Genus: Sorbus
- Species: S. wallichii

Binomial name
- Sorbus wallichii (Hook.f.) Yu & L.T. Lu

Synonyms
- List: Pyrus wallichii Hook.f.; Pyrus wattii (Koehne) Bennet; Sorbus apicidens Merr.; Sorbus wattii Koehne

= Sorbus wallichii =

Species of tree

Sorbus wallichii is a species of plant in the family Rosaceae. It is found in China, India, and Nepal.
