= Sorbus insignis =

Conservation status
- Least Concern (IUCN 3.1)

Scientific classification
- Kingdom: Plantae
- Clade: Tracheophytes
- Clade: Angiosperms
- Clade: Eudicots
- Clade: Rosids
- Order: Rosales
- Family: Rosaceae
- Genus: Sorbus
- Species: S. insignis

Binomial name
- Sorbus insignis (Hook.f.) Hedl.

Synonyms
- Pyrus insignis Hook.f.; Pyrus indica Roxb.

Species of tree

Sorbus insignis is a species of rowan. It is a tree to 10–15 metres (33–49 ft) tall, rarely a shrub. It is native to SW China (NW Yunnan and E Tibet), NE India (Manipur, Sikkim), Myanmar, and Nepal.

== Uses ==
The plant is sometimes grown as an ornamental plant in stone gardens, parks and yards.
