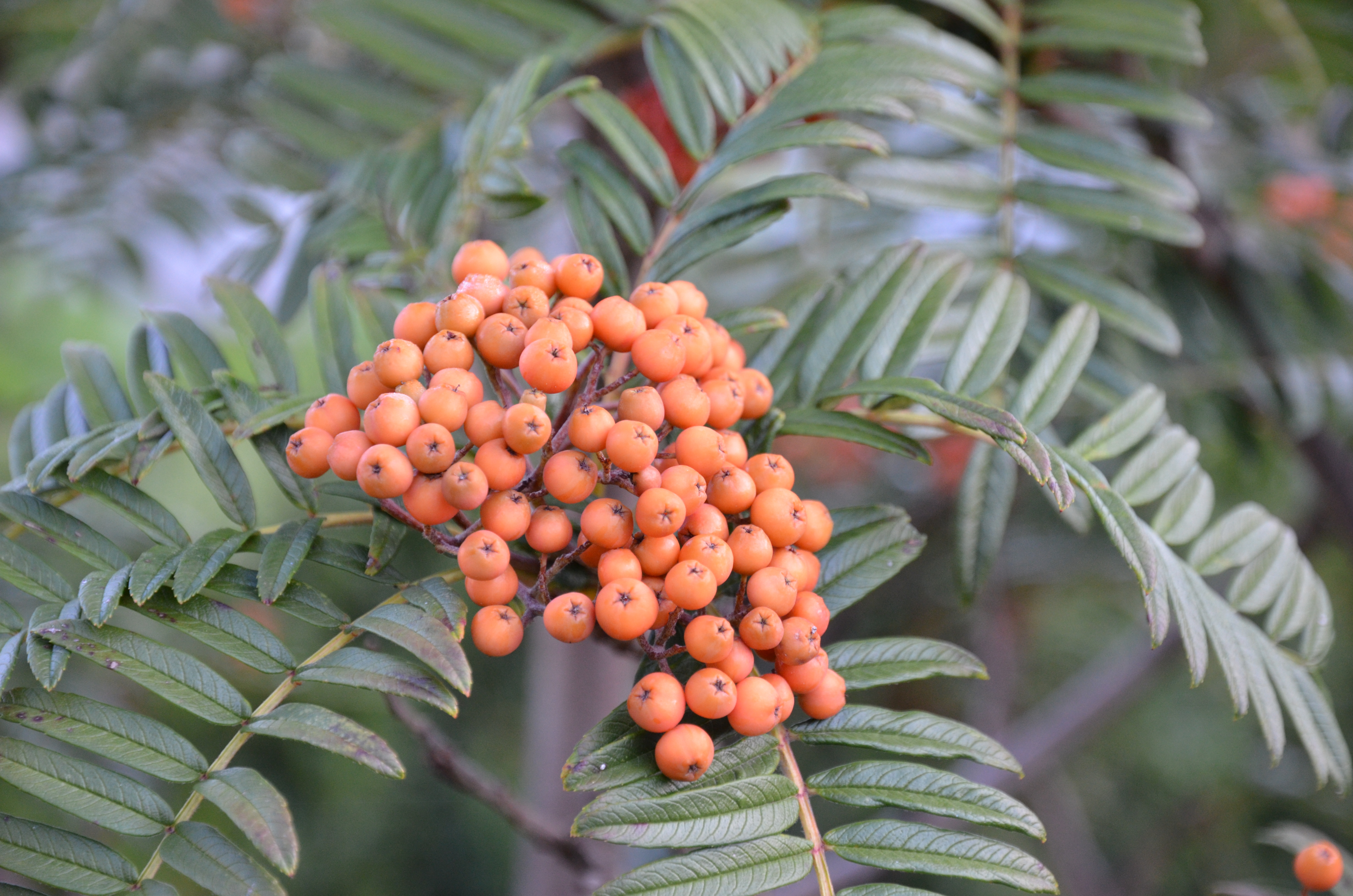

Scientific classification
- Kingdom: Plantae
- Clade: Tracheophytes
- Clade: Angiosperms
- Clade: Eudicots
- Clade: Rosids
- Order: Rosales
- Family: Rosaceae
- Genus: Sorbus
- Species: S. scalaris

Binomial name
- Sorbus scalaris Koehne

Synonyms
- List: Pyrus scalaris (Koehne) Bean; Pyrus pluripinnata (C.K.Schneid.) Cardot; Sorbus foliolosa var. pluripinnata C.K.Schneid.; Sorbus pluripinnata (C.K.Schneid.) Koehne

= Sorbus scalaris =

Species of tree

Sorbus scalaris is a species of rowan. It is native to western Sichuan and Yunnan in China where it grows in mixed forests on mountain slopes at altitudes of 1600–3000 m. S. scalaris is a shrub or small tree, 3–7 m tall.

Sorbus scalaris is sometimes cultivated. It has been labelled as the most attractive small tree among the orange-fruited Rowan species. Because it is self-incompatible and very few clones are cultivated, most seedlings raised from this species by gardeners are hybrids.
