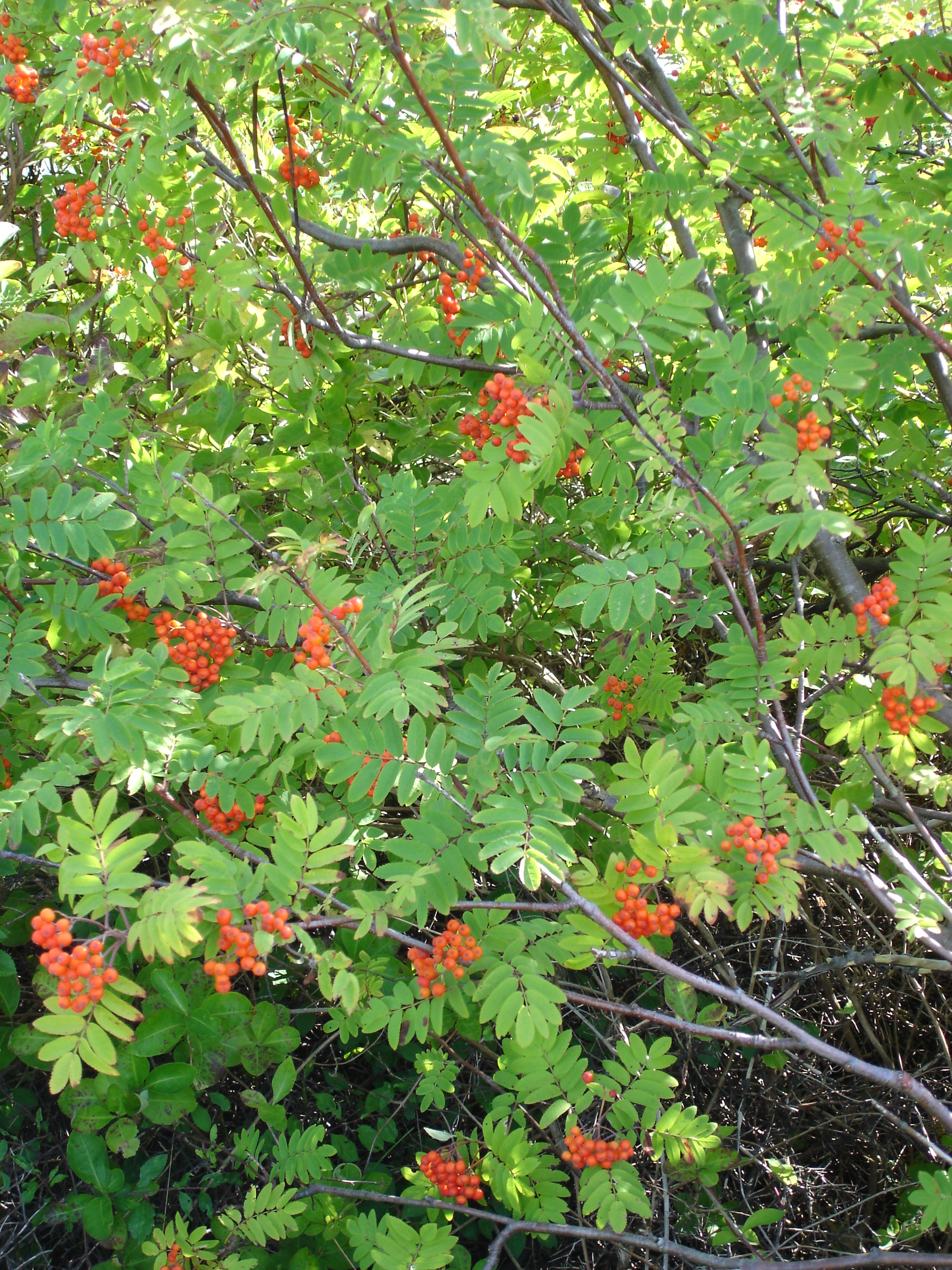
- European rowan (Sorbus aucuparia) with fruit

Scientific classification
- Kingdom: Plantae
- Clade: Tracheophytes
- Clade: Angiosperms
- Clade: Eudicots
- Clade: Rosids
- Order: Rosales
- Family: Rosaceae
- Subfamily: Amygdaloideae
- Tribe: Maleae
- Subtribe: Malinae
- Genus: Sorbus; L.

Type species
- Sorbus aucuparia L.

Species
- See here

= Sorbus =

Genus of flowering plants in the rose family

Sorbus is a genus of over 100 species of trees and shrubs in the rose family, Rosaceae. Species of Sorbus (s.str.) are commonly known as rowan or mountain-ash. The genus used to include species commonly known as whitebeam, chequer tree and service tree that are now classified in other genera (see below). The genus Sorbus, as currently circumscribed, includes only the pinnate leaved species of former subgenus Sorbus.

Sorbus is not closely related to the true ash trees which belong to the genus Fraxinus, although the leaves are superficially similar.

== Description ==
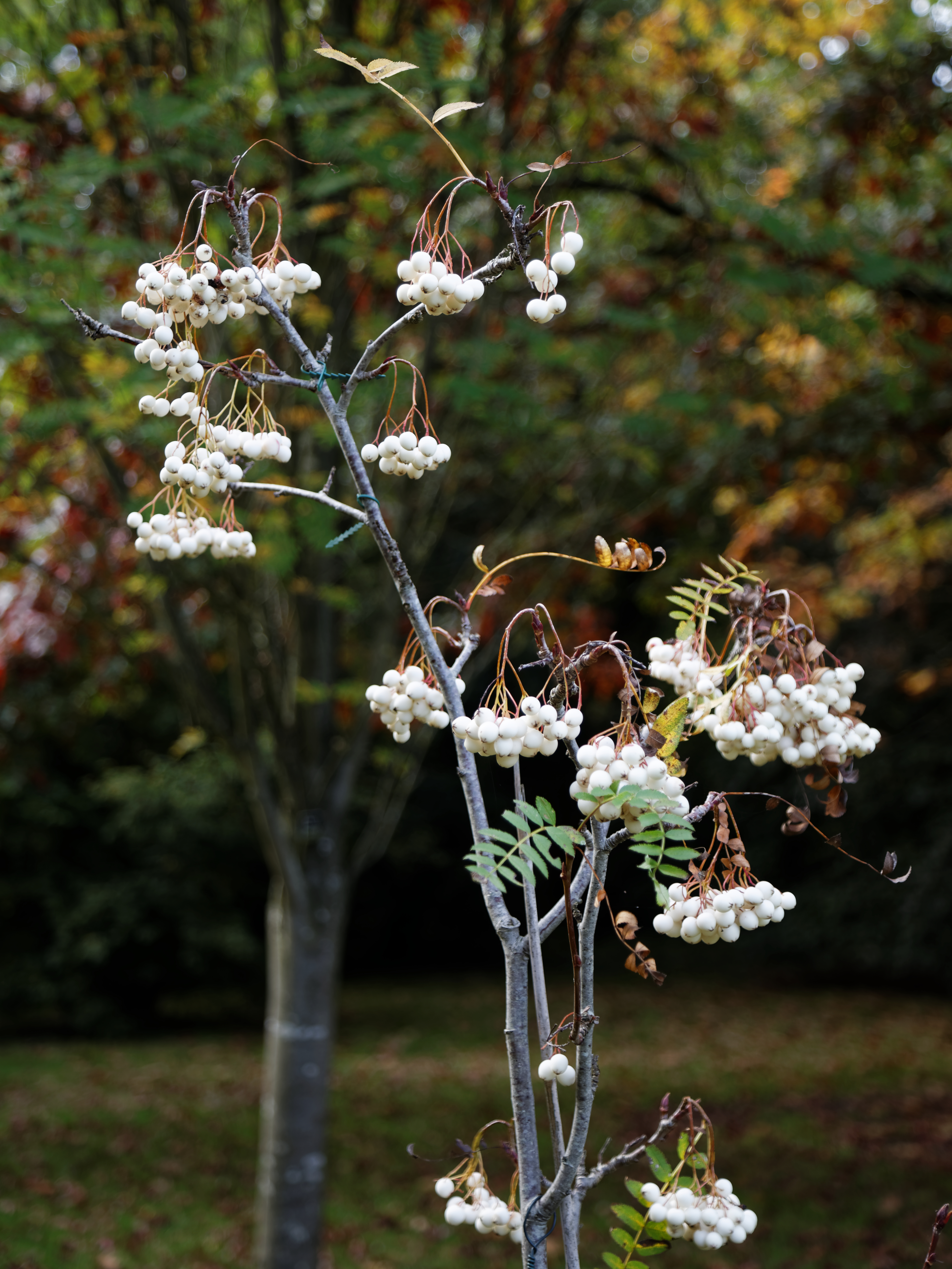
Fruiting Sorbus cashmiriana

=== Vegetative characteristics ===
Upper (left) and lower (right) surface of Sorbus aucuparia leaf

Sorbus are erect or ascending, 1–30 m tall, 1–8 stemmed shrubs or trees with initially smooth and later scaly, grey to brown or bronze bark with conspicuous, horizontal lenticels.

=== Generative characteristics ===
Detail of Sorbus aucuparia inflorescence

The 15–25(–44) stamens with ovoid or subglobose anthers are arranged in 2–3 whorls and are unequal in length. The red or orange, or more rarely brown or yellow, ovoid, globose, ellipsoid, or oblong, fleshy pome bears 3–5 seeds.

== Taxonomy ==
It was described by Carl Linnaeus in 1753. The type species is Sorbus aucuparia L. As treated in its broad sense, the genus was traditionally divided into several subgenera, but this treatment was found to be paraphyletic, comprising two disparate lineages within the Malinae subtribe. Consequently, each of the former subgenera have since been elevated into genera in their own right, with the genus name Sorbus retained only for the rowans. Additionally, it was recognised that despite a comparably large genetic distance between them, the genera Sorbus (sensu stricto), Aria, Chamaemespilus and Torminalis have interbred extensively, in various combinations, which lead to the recognition of an additional five intergeneric hybrid genera.

Sorbus (Sorbus)

- now genus Sorbus s.s., are commonly known as the rowan (primarily in the UK) or mountain-ash (in Ireland, North America and the UK), with compound leaves usually hairless or thinly hairy below; fruit carpels not fused; the type is Sorbus aucuparia (European rowan). Distribution: cool-temperate Northern Hemisphere.

Sorbus (Aria)

- now genus Aria and its intergeneric hybrids (see below), the whitebeams, with simple leaves usually strongly white-hairy below (hence the name, from German Weissbaum, 'white tree'); fruit carpels not fused; the type is Aria edulis (common whitebeam). Distribution: Europe, Maghreb and western Asia.

Sorbus (Micromeles)

- now genus Micromeles, a group of east Asian species with narrow leaves; sometimes previously included in subgenus Aria. Distribution: temperate and tropical east Asia.

Sorbus (Cormus)

- now genus Cormus, with compound leaves similar to subgenus Sorbus, but with distinct fused carpels in the fruit; just one species, Cormus domestica (true service tree). Distribution: North Africa, warm-temperate Europe, western Asia. Used to flavour some apple wines, see Apfelwein.

Sorbus (Torminaria)

- now genus Torminalis, with rather maple-like lobed leaves with pointed lobes; fruit carpels not fused; just one species (wild service tree). Distribution: warm-temperate Europe, south to the mountains of North Africa and east to the Caucasus and Lebanon ranges.

Sorbus (Chamaemespilus)

- now genus Chamaemespilus, monotypic, with a single shrubby species, false medlar. Has simple, glabrous leaves and pink flowers with erect sepals and petals. Distribution: mountains of southern Europe.

Intergeneric hybrid genera

- Hedlundia – Aria × Sorbus hybrids
- Karpatiosorbus – Aria × Torminalis hybrids
- Majovskya – Aria × Chamaemespilus hybrids
- Scandosorbus – syn. Borkhausenia; Aria × Sorbus × Torminalis hybrids
- Normeyera – Aria × Chamaemespilus × Sorbus hybrids

=== Species ===
It has 104 species:

- Sorbus albopilosa T.T.Yu & L.T.Lu
- Sorbus americana Marshall
- Sorbus amoena McAll.
- Sorbus arachnoidea Koehne
- Sorbus aucuparia L.
- Sorbus bissetii McAll.
- Sorbus bulleyana McAll.
- Sorbus californica Greene
- Sorbus carmesina McAll.
- Sorbus cashmiriana Hedl.
- Sorbus cibagouensis H.Peng & Z.J.Yin
- Sorbus cinereopubescens McAll.
- Sorbus commixta Hedl.
- Sorbus coxii McAll.
- Sorbus decora (Sarg.) C.K.Schneid.
- Sorbus discolor (Maxim.) Maxim.
- Sorbus dolichofoliolatus X.F.Gao & Meng Li
- Sorbus domugledica Kárpáti
- Sorbus doshonglaensis Xin Chen, Xiao C.Zhang & C.Q.Tang
- Sorbus eburnea McAll.
- Sorbus ellipsoidalis McAll.
- Sorbus erythrosepala Kainul., Sjöman & Aldén
- Sorbus erzincanica Dönmez
- Sorbus esserteauana Koehne
- Sorbus fansipanensis McAll.
- Sorbus faohraei Hedrén & J.Levin
- Sorbus filipes Hand.-Mazz.
- Sorbus foliolosa (Wall.) Spach
- Sorbus forrestii McAll. & Gillham
- Sorbus frutescens McAll.
- Sorbus fruticula R.Li & McAll.
- Sorbus gilgitana McAll.
- Sorbus glabriuscula McAll.
- Sorbus glomerulata Koehne
- Sorbus gonggashanica McAll.
- Sorbus gongshanensis X.F.Gao & Meng Li
- Sorbus gracilis (Siebold & Zucc.) K.Koch
- Sorbus hajastana Gabrieljan
- Sorbus harrowiana (Balf.f. & W.W.Sm.) Rehder
- Sorbus helenae Koehne
- Sorbus herculis Kárpáti
- Sorbus himalaica Gabrieljan
- Sorbus hugh-mcallisteri Mikoláš
- Sorbus hupehensis C.K.Schneid.
- Sorbus insignis (Hook.f.) Hedl.
- Sorbus keenanii Rushforth
- Sorbus khumbuensis McAll.
- Sorbus kiukiangensis T.T.Yu
- Sorbus koehneana C.K.Schneid.
- Sorbus kongboensis McAll.
- Sorbus kurzii (G.Watt ex Prain) C.K.Schneid.
- Sorbus kusnetzovii Zinserl.
- Sorbus lanpingensis L.T.Lu
- Sorbus lingshiensis Rushforth
- Sorbus longii Rushforth
- Sorbus lushanensis Xin Chen & Jing Qiu
- Sorbus macallisteri Rushforth
- Sorbus macrantha Merr.
- Sorbus maderensis (Lowe) Dode
- Sorbus matsumurana (Makino) Koehne
- Sorbus microphylla Wenz.
- Sorbus monbeigii (Cardot) N.P.Balakr.
- Sorbus muliensis McAll.
- Sorbus obsoletidentata (Cardot) T.T.Yu
- Sorbus occidentalis (S.Watson) Greene
- Sorbus oligodonta (Cardot) Hand.-Mazz.
- Sorbus olivacea McAll.
- Sorbus ovalis McAll.
- Sorbus parva McAll.
- Sorbus parvifolia (Blatt.) N.P.Balakr.
- Sorbus parvifructa McAll.
- Sorbus poteriifolia Hand.-Mazz.
- Sorbus prattii Koehne
- Sorbus × proctoriana T.C.G.Rich
- Sorbus pseudohupehensis McAll.
- Sorbus pseudovilmorinii McAll.
- Sorbus randaiensis (Hayata) Koidz.
- Sorbus reducta Diels
- Sorbus rehderiana Koehne
- Sorbus rinzenii Rushforth
- Sorbus rockii P.D.Sell
- Sorbus rosea McAll.
- Sorbus rubescens McAll.
- Sorbus rufopilosa C.K.Schneid.
- Sorbus rushforthii McAll.
- Sorbus rutilans McAll.
- Sorbus sambucifolia (Cham. & Schltdl.) M.Roem.
- Sorbus sargentiana Koehne
- Sorbus scalaris Koehne
- Sorbus scopulina Greene
- Sorbus setschwanensis (C.K.Schneid.) Koehne
- Sorbus shirinensis Hadač & Chrtek
- Sorbus sitchensis M.Roem.
- Sorbus splendens Grimshaw & C.R.Sanders
- Sorbus sujoyi Ghora
- Sorbus tenuis McAll.
- Sorbus tianschanica Rupr.
- Sorbus tiantangensis X.M.Liu & C.L.Wang
- Sorbus tiliifolia H.Zare, Amini & Assadi
- Sorbus ulleungensis Chin S.Chang
- Sorbus ursina (Wall. ex G.Don) S.Schauer
- Sorbus vilmorinii C.K.Schneid.
- Sorbus wallichii (Hook.f.) T.T.Yu
- Sorbus wilsoniana C.K.Schneid.
- Sorbus × yokouchii M.Mizush. ex T.Shimizu
- Sorbus zayuensis T.T.Yu & L.T.Lu

== Uses ==
=== Ornamental trees ===
Sorbus species are cultivated as ornamental trees for parks and gardens and as avenue trees, and have given rise to several cultivars. The following, of mixed or uncertain parentage, have gained the Royal Horticultural Society's Award of Garden Merit:

- 'Eastern Promise' (purple autumn colour, pink berries)
- 'Leonard Messel' named for Leonard Messel of Nymans in Sussex. (small tree to 4m, pink berries)
- 'Wisley Gold' (yellow berries)

== Gallery ==
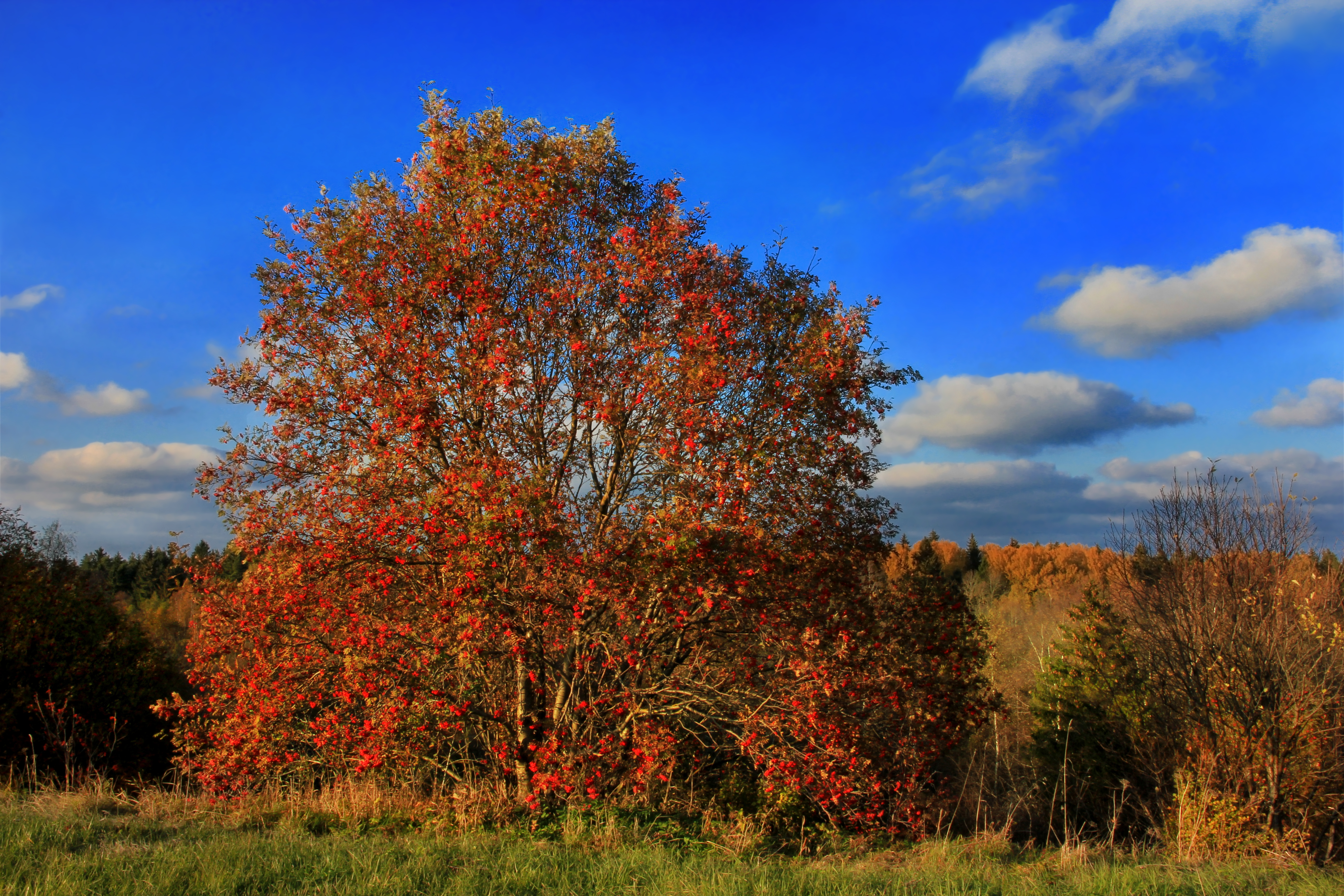
Red rowan

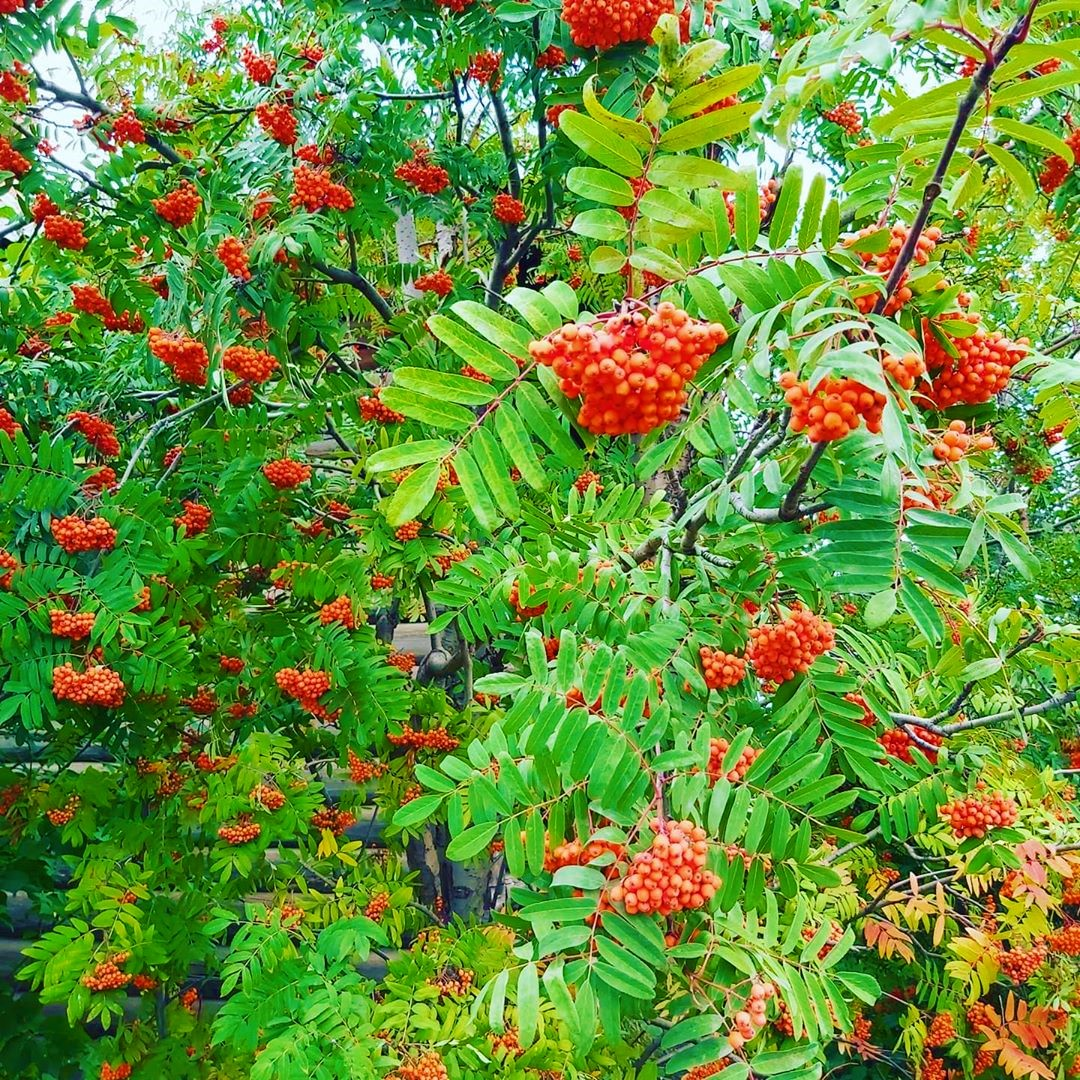
Rowan in the garden of Eastern Siberia

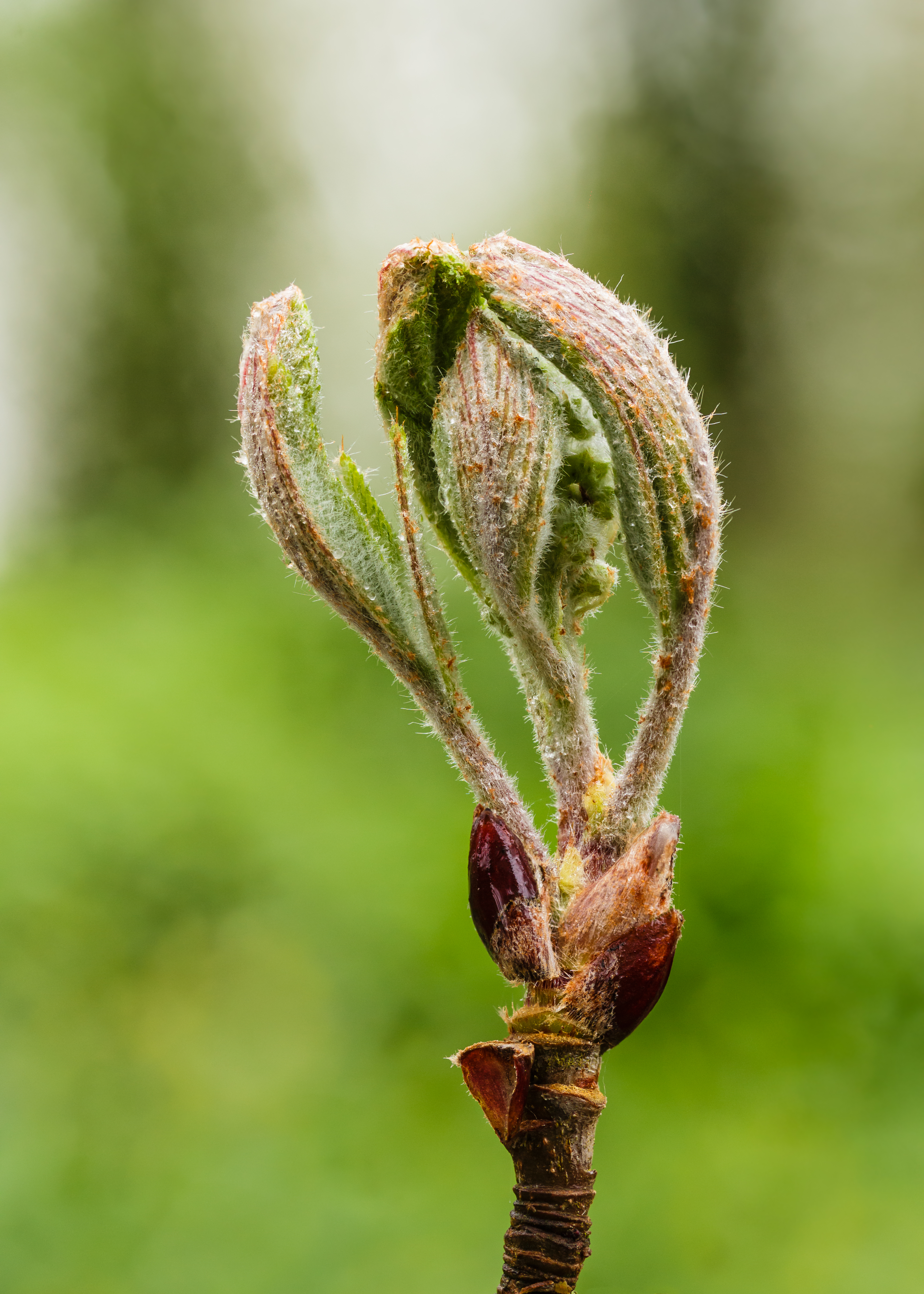
New leaf from one Sorbus opens up.
