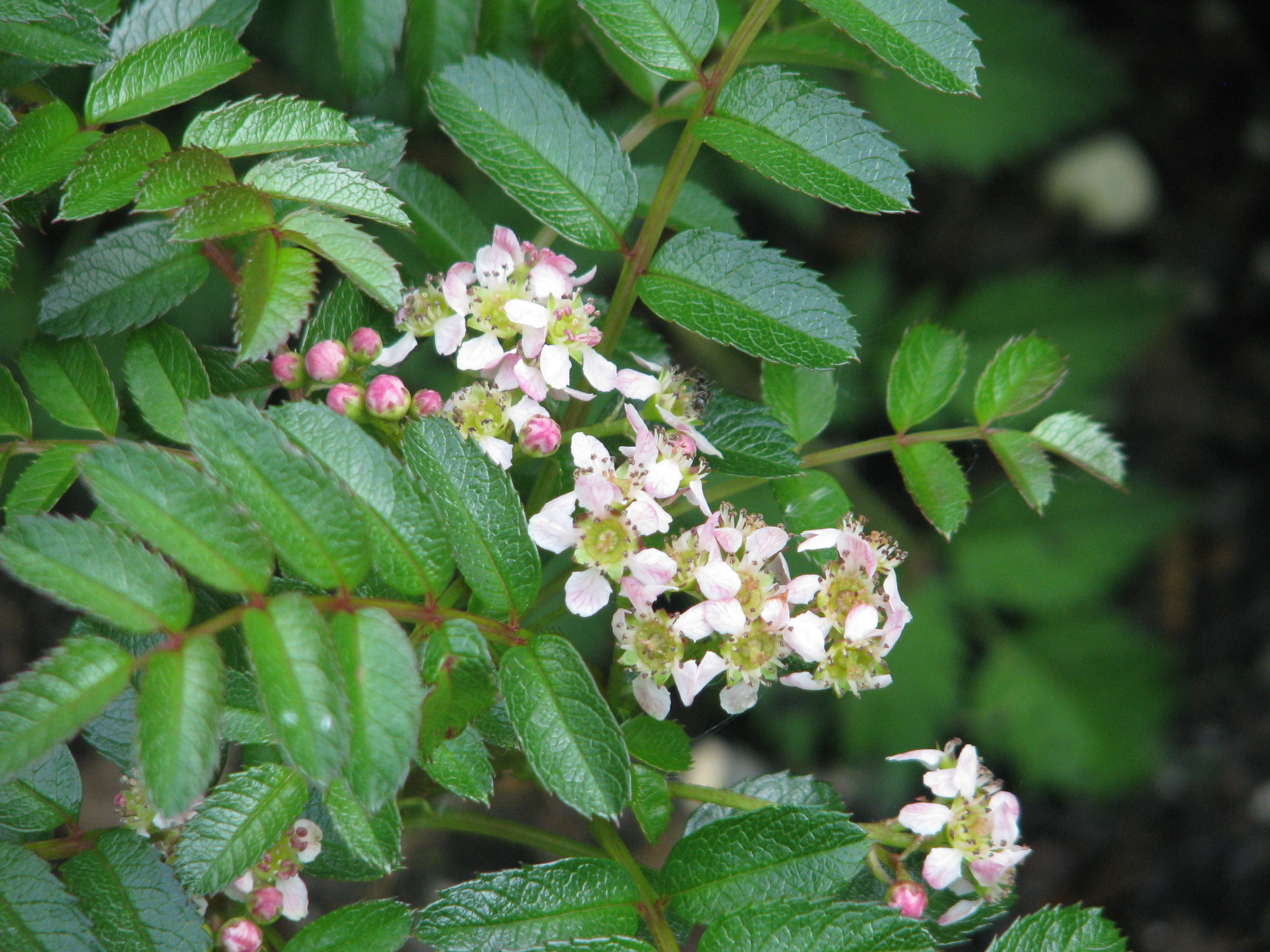
- Leaves and flowers

Scientific classification
- Kingdom: Plantae
- Clade: Embryophytes
- Clade: Tracheophytes
- Clade: Spermatophytes
- Clade: Angiosperms
- Clade: Eudicots
- Clade: Rosids
- Order: Rosales
- Family: Rosaceae
- Genus: Sorbus
- Species: S. poteriifolia

Binomial name
- Sorbus poteriifolia Hand.-Mazz.

Synonyms
- Pyrus poteriifolia (Hand.-Mazz.) M.F.Fay & Christenh.

= Sorbus poteriifolia =

Species of flowering plant

Sorbus poteriifolia is a species of rowan native to south-central China and northern Myanmar. It is a shrub found at 3,000 to 4,000 m (9,800 to 13,100 ft) above sea level. It has gained the Royal Horticultural Society's Award of Garden Merit as an ornamental.
