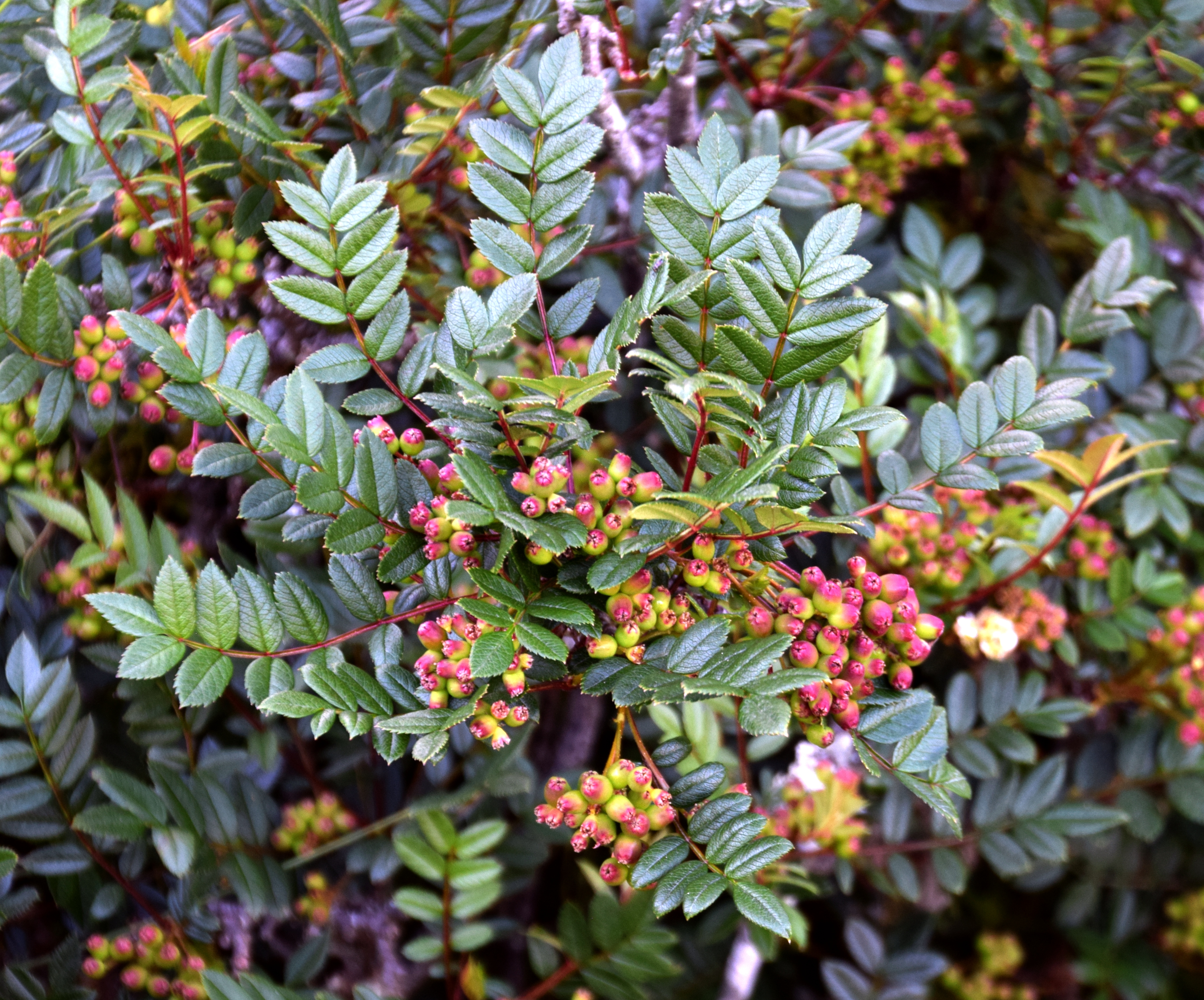

Scientific classification
- Kingdom: Plantae
- Clade: Tracheophytes
- Clade: Angiosperms
- Clade: Eudicots
- Clade: Rosids
- Order: Rosales
- Family: Rosaceae
- Genus: Sorbus
- Species: S. reducta

Binomial name
- Sorbus reducta Diels

Synonyms
- Pyrus reducta (Diels) M.F.Fay & Christenh.

= Sorbus reducta =

Species of flowering plant

Sorbus reducta , the dwarf Chinese mountain ash, is a species of flowering plant in the family Rosaceae, native to western China (South West Sichuan and North West Yunnan). Growing to 1.5 m (5 ft) tall by 2 m (7 ft) wide, it is a dense deciduous spreading shrub. Each leaf, 10 cm (4 in) long, has up to 15 leaflets which turn to brilliant shades of red in the autumn (fall). White flowers in spring are followed by red or pink, and then white berries in autumn.

The Latin specific epithet reducta means "dwarf", referring to its compact habit.

This plant has gained the Royal Horticultural Society's Award of Garden Merit.

== Subordinate taxa ==
- Sorbus reducta var. pubescens
- Sorbus reducta var. reducta
