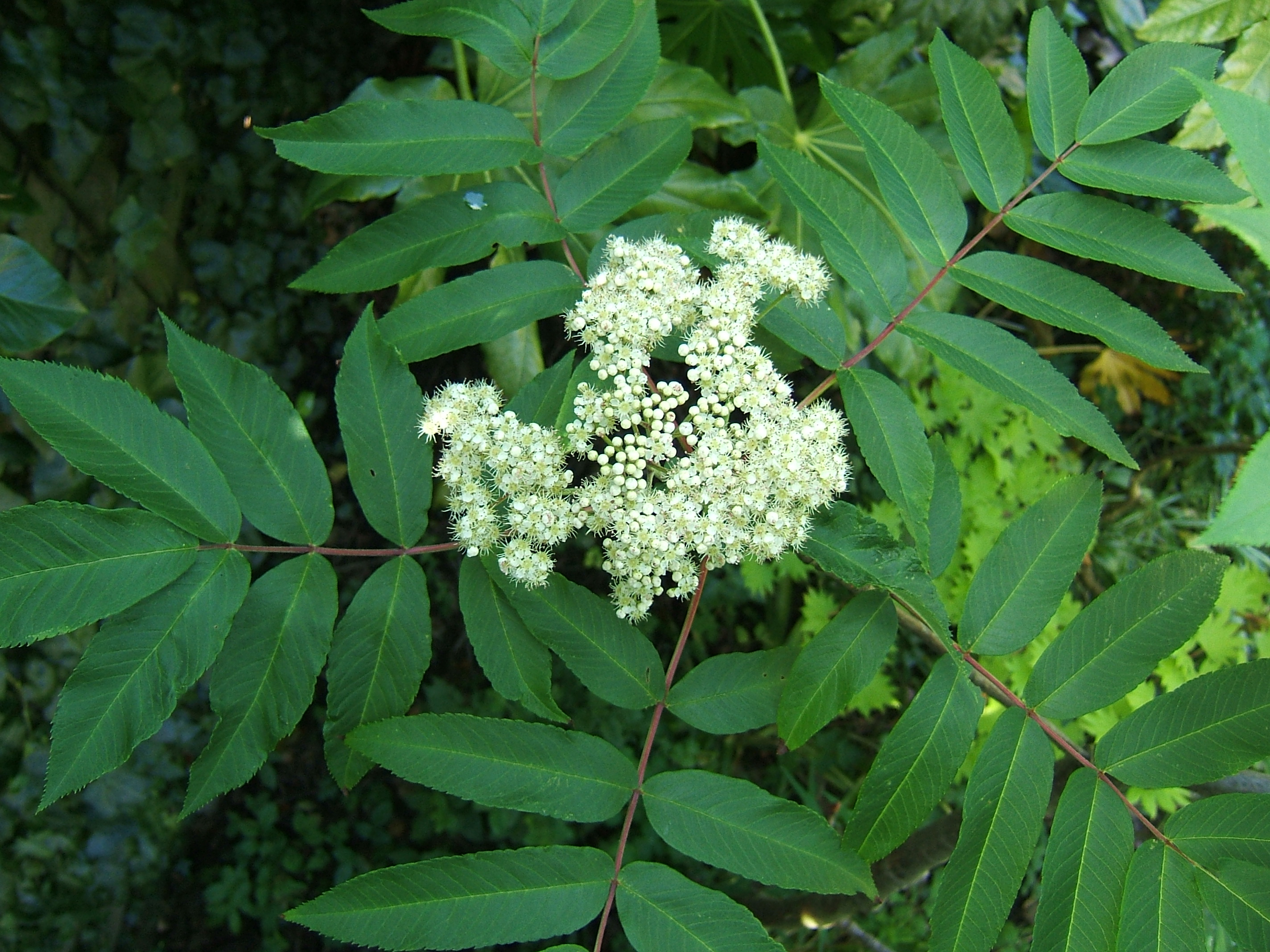
- Foliage and flowers

Scientific classification
- Kingdom: Plantae
- Clade: Tracheophytes
- Clade: Angiosperms
- Clade: Eudicots
- Clade: Rosids
- Order: Rosales
- Family: Rosaceae
- Genus: Sorbus
- Species: S. sargentiana

Binomial name
- Sorbus sargentiana Koehne

Synonyms
- Pyrus sargentiana (Koehne) Bean

= Sorbus sargentiana =

Species of tree

Sorbus sargentiana, commonly known as Sargent's rowan is a species of flowering plant in the family Rosaceae. It is native to southwestern Sichuan and northern Yunnan in China, where it grows at altitudes of 2,000–3,200 m (6,560–10,500 ft).

== Name ==
The specific epithet sargentiana refers to the American dendrologist Charles Sprague Sargent.

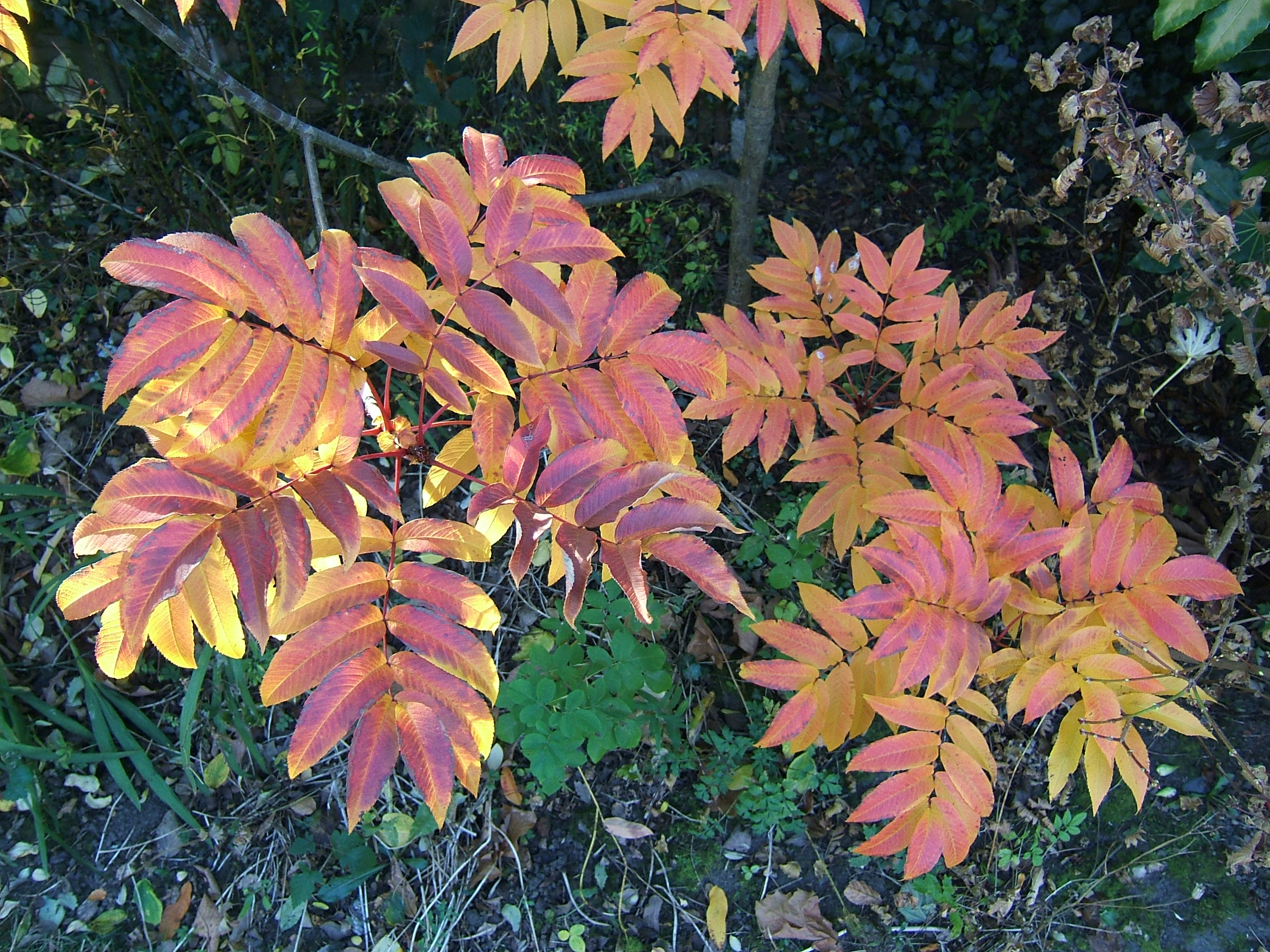
Autumn colour

== Description ==
It is a small to medium-sized deciduous tree growing to 6–16 m (20–52 ft) tall, with a trunk up to 50 cm (20 in) in diameter, and a rounded crown. The bark is dark grey, and the shoots are very stout, with large (1–2 cm), dark red, sticky resinous winter buds. The leaves are the largest of any rowan, dark green with impressed veining above, glaucous beneath, 20–35 cm (8–14 in) long and 15–20 cm (6–8 in) broad, with persistent 1 cm broad stipules. The pinnate leaves consist of 9–11 oblong-lanceolate leaflets 5–14 cm (2–6 in) cm long and 3.5–5 cm (1–2 in) broad, with an acute apex, serrated margins. The basal leaflets are slightly smaller than the apical leaflets. They change to a rich orange-pink to purple or dark red in mid-autumn (fall). The flowers are 5–7 mm in diameter, with five white petals and 20 yellowish-white stamens; they are produced 200–500 together in very large corymbs 12–25 cm (5–10 in) in diameter, in late spring to early summer. The fruit is a pome 5–8 mm diameter, bright orange-red to red, maturing in early autumn; it is juicy, and readily eaten as soon as it is ripe by thrushes, which disperse the seeds.

== Cultivation and uses ==
It is grown as an ornamental tree for its bold foliage, huge clusters of fruit, and bright autumn colour. It has gained the Royal Horticultural Society's Award of Garden Merit.
