= Sorbus esserteauana =

Scientific classification
- Kingdom: Plantae
- Clade: Tracheophytes
- Clade: Angiosperms
- Clade: Eudicots
- Clade: Rosids
- Order: Rosales
- Family: Rosaceae
- Genus: Sorbus
- Species: S. esserteauana

Binomial name
- Sorbus esserteauana Koehne

Species of tree

Sorbus esserteauana, commonly known as Esserteau's rowan, is a species of rowan. It is a small tree, typically 5–10 metres (16–33 ft) tall growing in mountain thickets and cliffs. It is an endemic species to China, being only found in western Sichuan. It has small white flowers and small red berries that are actually a pome fruit. Unlike all other species of Sorbus, the fruit are hard and inedible to humans, but they are eaten by birds that scatter the seeds. It is cultivated as an ornamental plant in gardens and parks for its decorative fruit and because it attracts birds.

When published the epithet was written as "esserteauiana". However, according to ICBN (Vienna Code) Art. 60.11 and 60C.1(c), the connecting vowel -i- in it is unnecessary and thus must be deleted.
