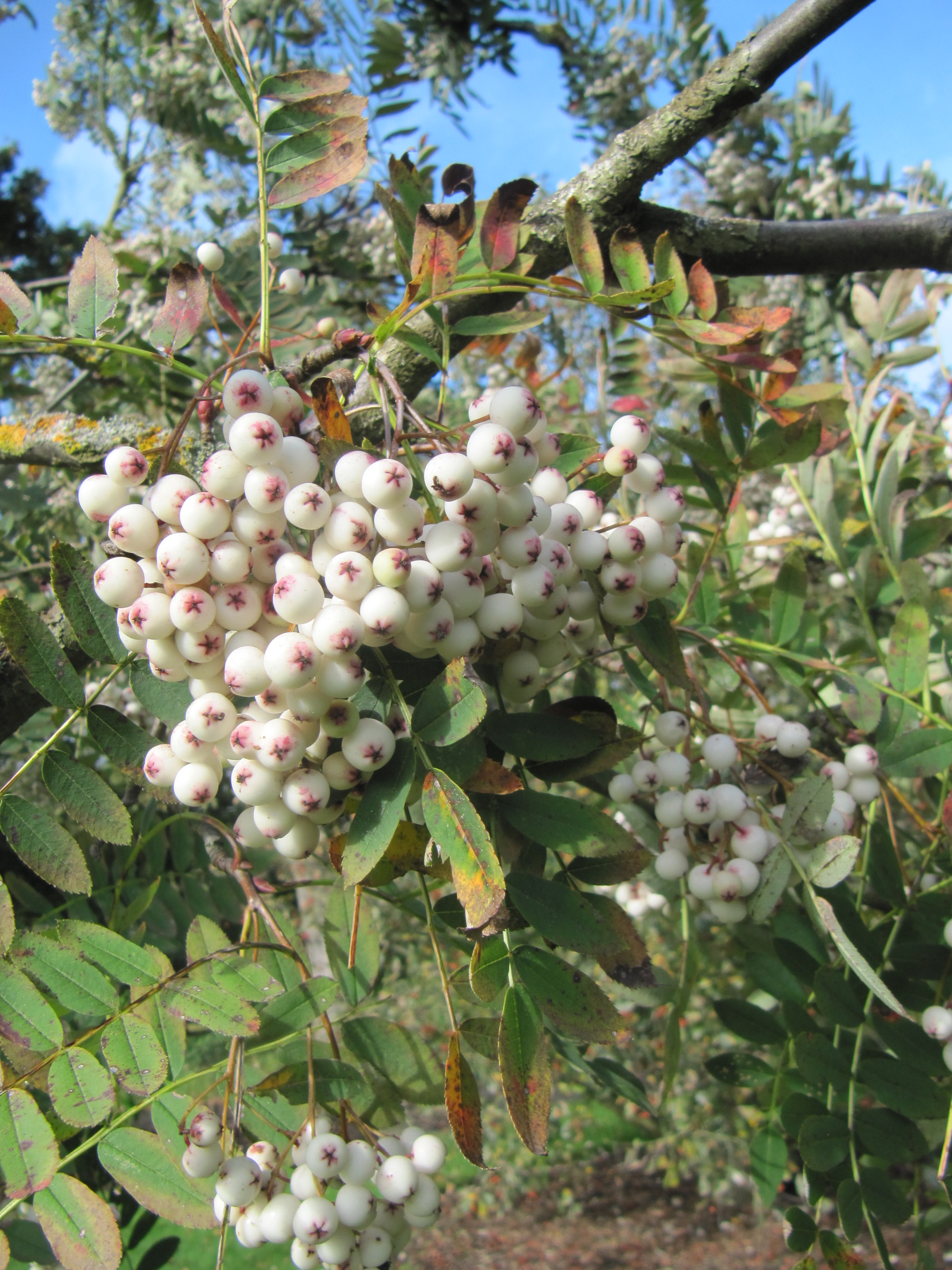

Scientific classification
- Kingdom: Plantae
- Clade: Tracheophytes
- Clade: Angiosperms
- Clade: Eudicots
- Clade: Rosids
- Order: Rosales
- Family: Rosaceae
- Genus: Sorbus
- Species: S. forrestii

Binomial name
- Sorbus forrestii McAll. & Gillham

Synonyms
- Sorbus prattii Hand.-Mazz.

= Sorbus forrestii =

Species of tree

Sorbus forrestii, commonly known as Forrest's rowan, is a species of flowering plant in the family Rosaceae, native to western China. Growing to 8 m (26 ft) tall and broad, it is a spreading deciduous tree with leaves up to 20 cm (7.9 in) long, each divided into up to 19 leaflets (pinnate). White flowers in spring are followed by masses of white berries with pink tips in autumn.

The Latin-specific epithet forrestii honours the Scottish botanist and plant collector George Forrest (1873-1932), who brought thousands of plant specimens and seeds back to Britain. Forrest had his base in North West Yunnan, which is where S. forrestii originally came from.

This hardy tree is suitable for cultivation in parks and large gardens. It has gained the Royal Horticultural Society's Award of Garden Merit.
