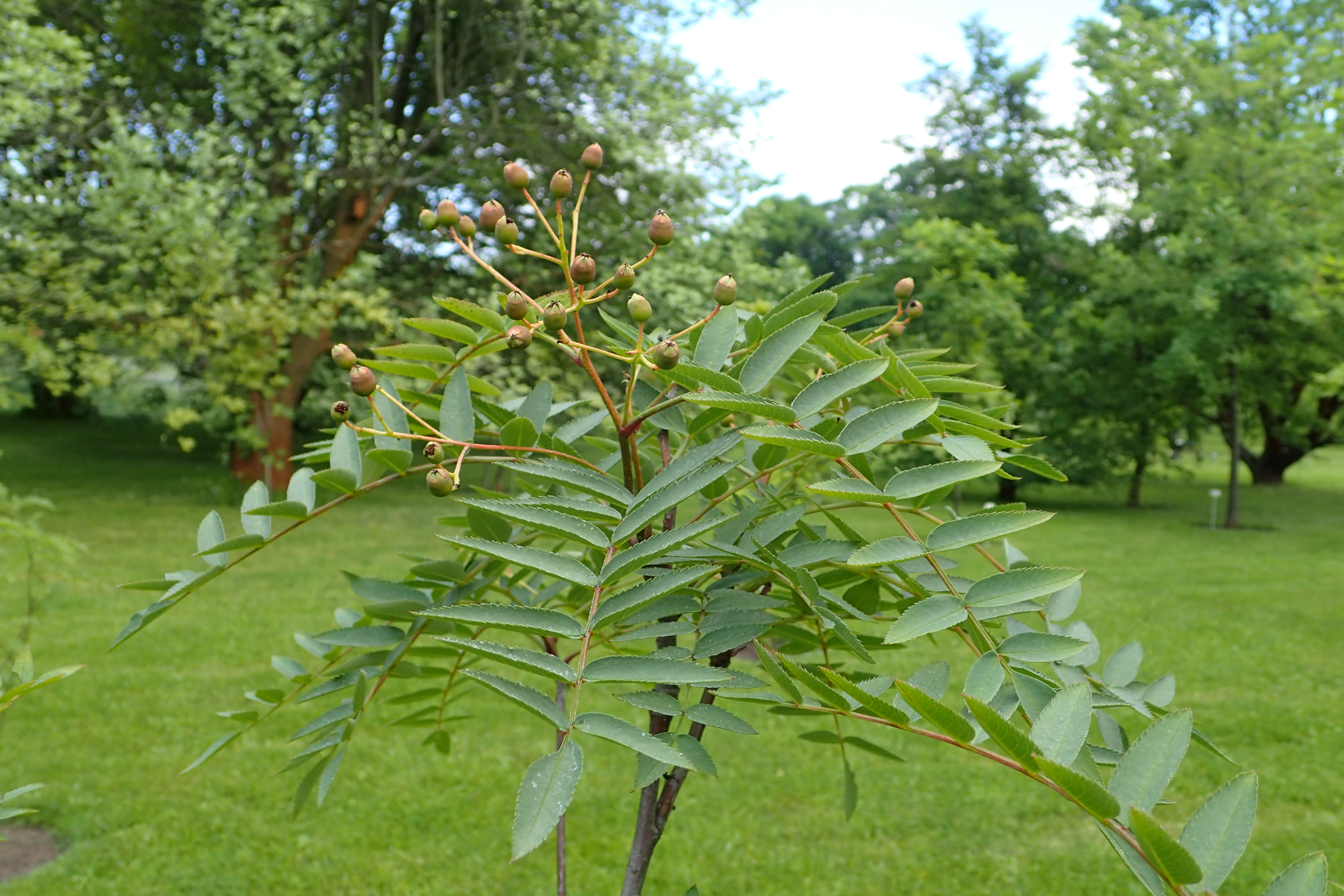

Scientific classification
- Kingdom: Plantae
- Clade: Embryophytes
- Clade: Tracheophytes
- Clade: Spermatophytes
- Clade: Angiosperms
- Clade: Eudicots
- Clade: Rosids
- Order: Rosales
- Family: Rosaceae
- Genus: Sorbus
- Species: S. rosea

Binomial name
- Sorbus rosea McAll.

Synonyms
- Pyrus gulabi M.F.Fay & Christenh.

= Sorbus rosea =

Species of flowering plant

Sorbus rosea is a species of rowan native to Kashmir in Pakistan. It is a small tree with large pink flowers and berries, dark green leaves turning to red in the Autumn, and reddish bark with silver patches. It has gained the Royal Horticultural Society's Award of Garden Merit as an ornamental.
