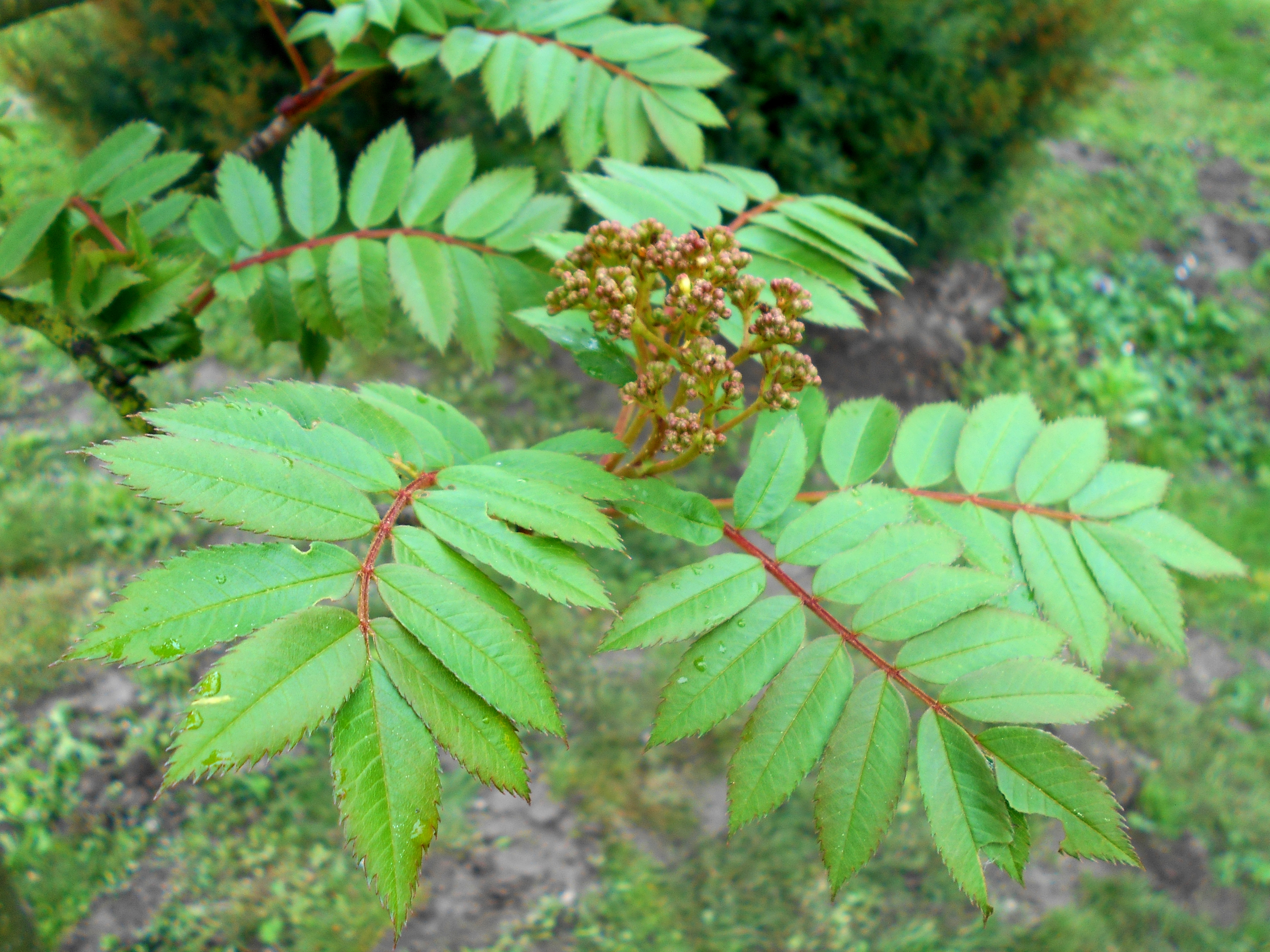
- At the botanical garden of Maria Curie-Skłodowska University

Scientific classification
- Kingdom: Plantae
- Clade: Embryophytes
- Clade: Tracheophytes
- Clade: Spermatophytes
- Clade: Angiosperms
- Clade: Eudicots
- Clade: Rosids
- Order: Rosales
- Family: Rosaceae
- Genus: Sorbus
- Species: S. discolor

Binomial name
- Sorbus discolor (Maxim.) Maxim.

Synonyms
- Pyrus discolor Maxim.; Pyrus pekinensis (Koehne) Cardot; Sorbus pekinensis Koehne

= Sorbus discolor =

Species of flowering plant

Sorbus discolor is a species of flowering plant in the family Rosaceae, native to China. Although it is recorded in wide use as an ornamental tree in the United Kingdom and other countries, it is not; "Sorbus discolor" is a name erroneously applied to Sorbus commixta, the Japanese rowan. Sorbus commixta fruit is bright orange to red, whereas the fruit of Sorbus discolor is white, or possibly dull pink to yellowish-orange.
