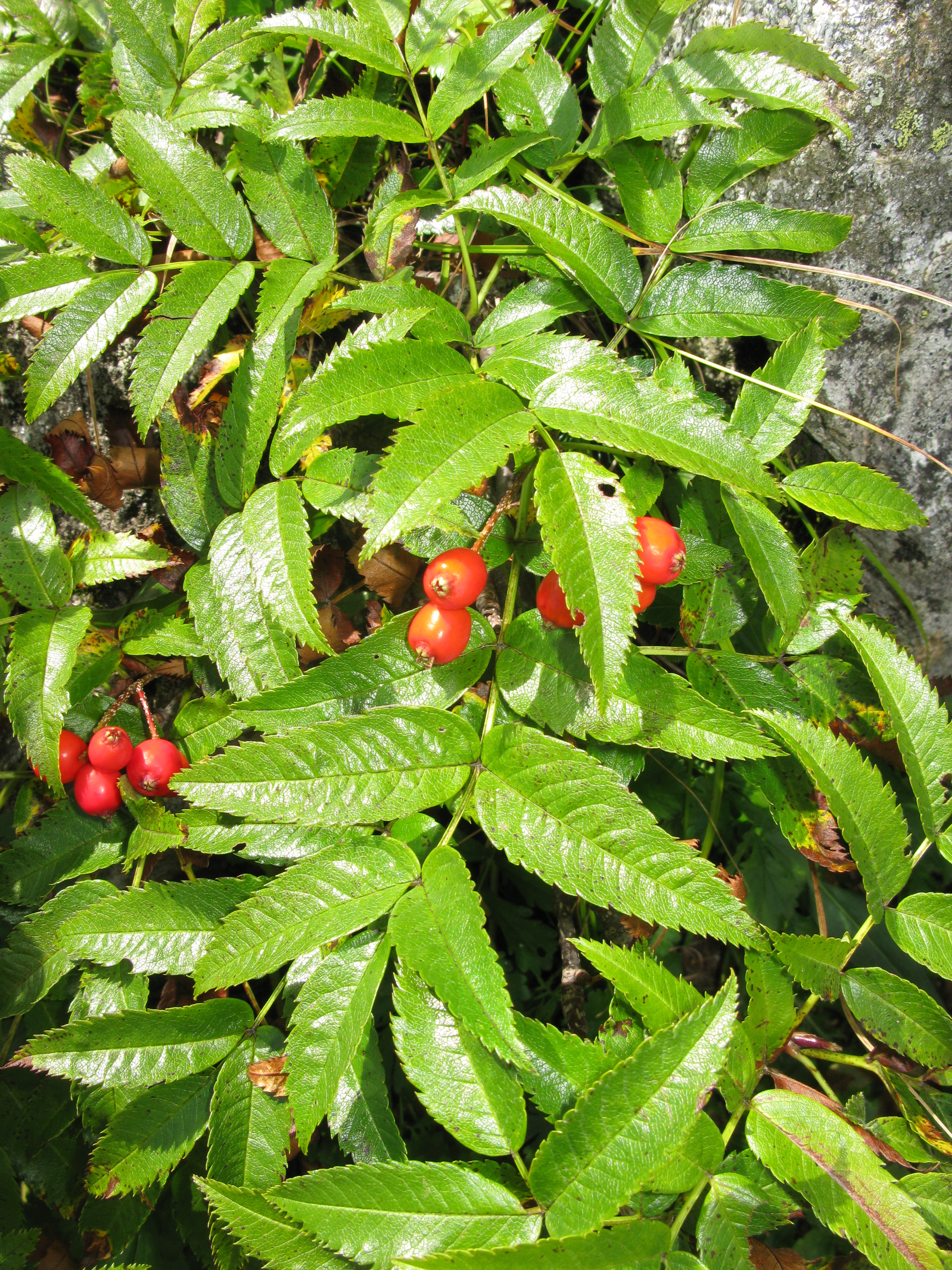

Scientific classification
- Kingdom: Plantae
- Clade: Tracheophytes
- Clade: Angiosperms
- Clade: Eudicots
- Clade: Rosids
- Order: Rosales
- Family: Rosaceae
- Genus: Sorbus
- Species: S. sambucifolia

Binomial name
- Sorbus sambucifolia (Cham. & Schltdl.) M.Roem.

Synonyms
- List: Pyrus sambucifolia Cham. & Schltdl.; Sorbus sambucifolia var. typica C.K.Schneid.; Pyrus sambucifolia var. platyphyllaria Cardot; Pyrus sambucifolia var. pseudogracilis (C.K.Schneid.) Cardot; Pyrus sambucifolia var. pumila Raf. ex Sarg.; Sorbus pseudogracilis (C.K.Schneid.) Koehne; Sorbus sambucifolia var. pseudogracilis C.K.Schneid.; Sorbus sambucifolia var. pumila Raf. ex Koehne; Sorbus schneideriana Koehne

= Sorbus sambucifolia =

Species of plant

Sorbus sambucifolia is a species of rowan native to Korea, northern and central Japan, Russian Far East and Alaska.
