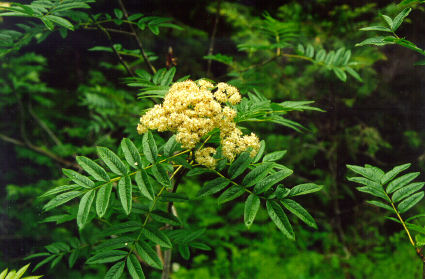

Scientific classification
- Kingdom: Plantae
- Clade: Tracheophytes
- Clade: Angiosperms
- Clade: Eudicots
- Clade: Rosids
- Order: Rosales
- Family: Rosaceae
- Genus: Sorbus
- Section: Sorbus sect. Commixtae
- Species: S. scopulina

Binomial name
- Sorbus scopulina Greene
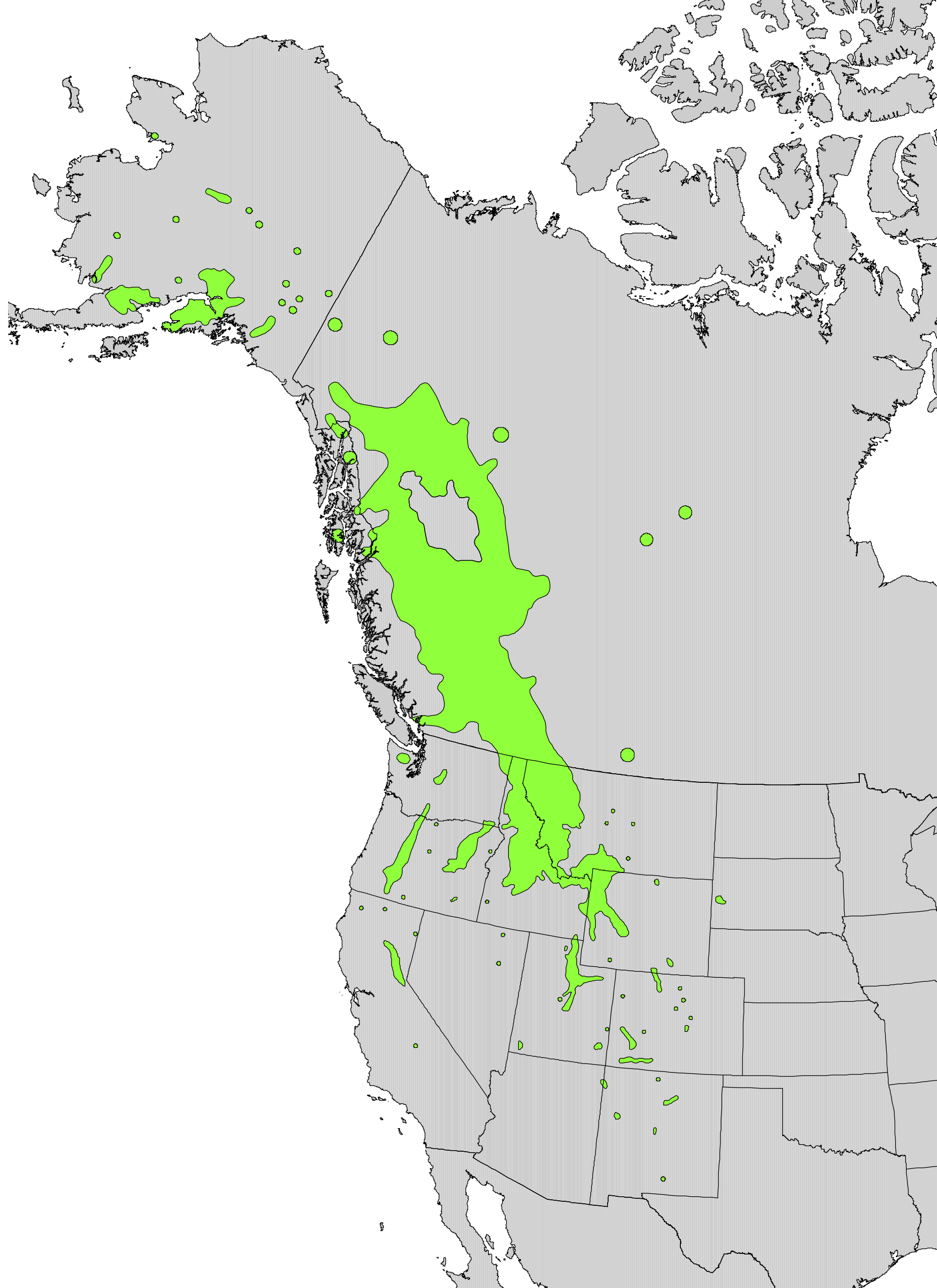
- Native range

Synonyms
- List: Pyrus scopulina (Greene) Longyear; Pyrus andersonii (G.N.Jones) M.F.Fay & Christenh.; Pyrus cascadensis (G.N.Jones) M.F.Fay & Christenh.; Sorbus alaskana G.N.Jones; Sorbus andersonii G.N.Jones; Sorbus angustifolia Rydb.; Sorbus cascadensis G.N.Jones; Sorbus dumosa Greene; Sorbus sambucifolia Rydb.; Sorbus scopulina var. cascadensis (G.N.Jones) C.L.Hitchc.; Sorbus sitchensis var. densa Jeps.; Sorbus sitchensis subsp. densa (Jeps.) A.E.Murray

= Sorbus scopulina =

Species of fruit and plant

Sorbus scopulina, also known as Greene's mountain-ash, is a North American species of rowan within the rose family. Although it may resemble poisonous species of baneberries, its own fruits are edible.

== Description ==
It is a shrub or small tree growing up to 5 metres (16 feet) tall. Its pinnate leaves have 9–13 leaflets. The flowers have five white-to-cream petals, each a few centimetres in length. The fruit is an orange-to-red pome about 1.5 cm (1/2 inch) across. The plant can be confused with poisonous baneberries, particularly the red baneberry.

== Taxonomy ==
The common name of the species honors American botanist Edward Lee Greene. Throughout the Cascade Mountains and the Pacific Northwest portions of its habitat, it is commonly called Cascade mountain-ash, sometimes listed as Sorbus scopulina var. cascadensis.

== Distribution and habitat ==
It is native to western North America, primarily in the Rocky Mountains. Various birds and mammals, including bears, consume the fruit.

== Uses ==
Despite their resemblance to poisonous baneberries, the edible fruits were used by Native Americans and early settlers, being cooked and made into jelly. They taste bitter when fresh, and are better when they redden.
