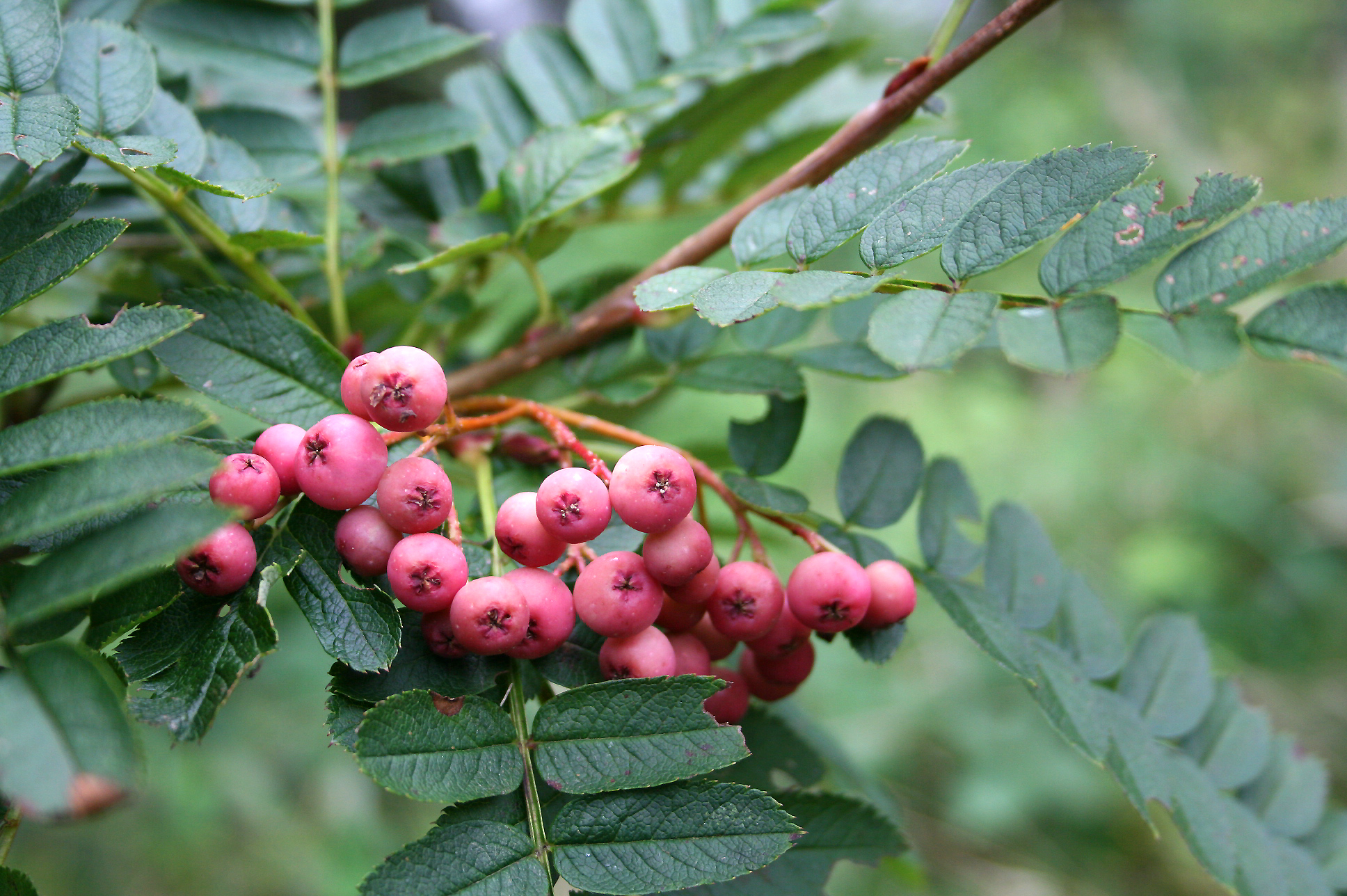

Scientific classification
- Kingdom: Plantae
- Clade: Tracheophytes
- Clade: Angiosperms
- Clade: Eudicots
- Clade: Rosids
- Order: Rosales
- Family: Rosaceae
- Genus: Sorbus
- Species: S. vilmorinii

Binomial name
- Sorbus vilmorinii C.K.Schneid.

Synonyms
- Pyrus vilmorinii (C.K.Schneid.) Asch. & Graebn.; Cormus foliolosa M.Vilm. & Bois; Sorbus vilmorinii var. typica C.K.Schneid.

= Sorbus vilmorinii =

Species of tree

Sorbus vilmorinii, the Vilmorin's rowan or Vilmorin's mountain ash, is a species of flowering plant in the family Rosaceae, native to Sichuan, Tibet and Yunnan in China.

It is a deciduous shrub or small tree, 4–6 metres (13–20 ft) tall, with ferny leaves, each having multiple leaflets that turn purple in autumn (fall). The fruits, which can last through winter, are crimson, turning to pale pink. They are ornamental, and not for consumption.

The specific epithet vilmorinii refers to the 19th century French horticulturalist Maurice de Vilmorin.

It grows in a wide range of habitats (mountain slopes, roadsides, mixed forests along river banks, grasslands, bamboo thickets).

Sorbus vilmorinii was described based on a specimen in cultivation that was an apomictic microspecies. However, almost indistinguishable specimens are diploid and frequent in the wild. Also hybrids are common in the wild.

In cultivation, this plant provides a long season of interest as an elegant, compact tree which can be grown in smaller gardens. It has gained the Royal Horticultural Society's Award of Garden Merit.
