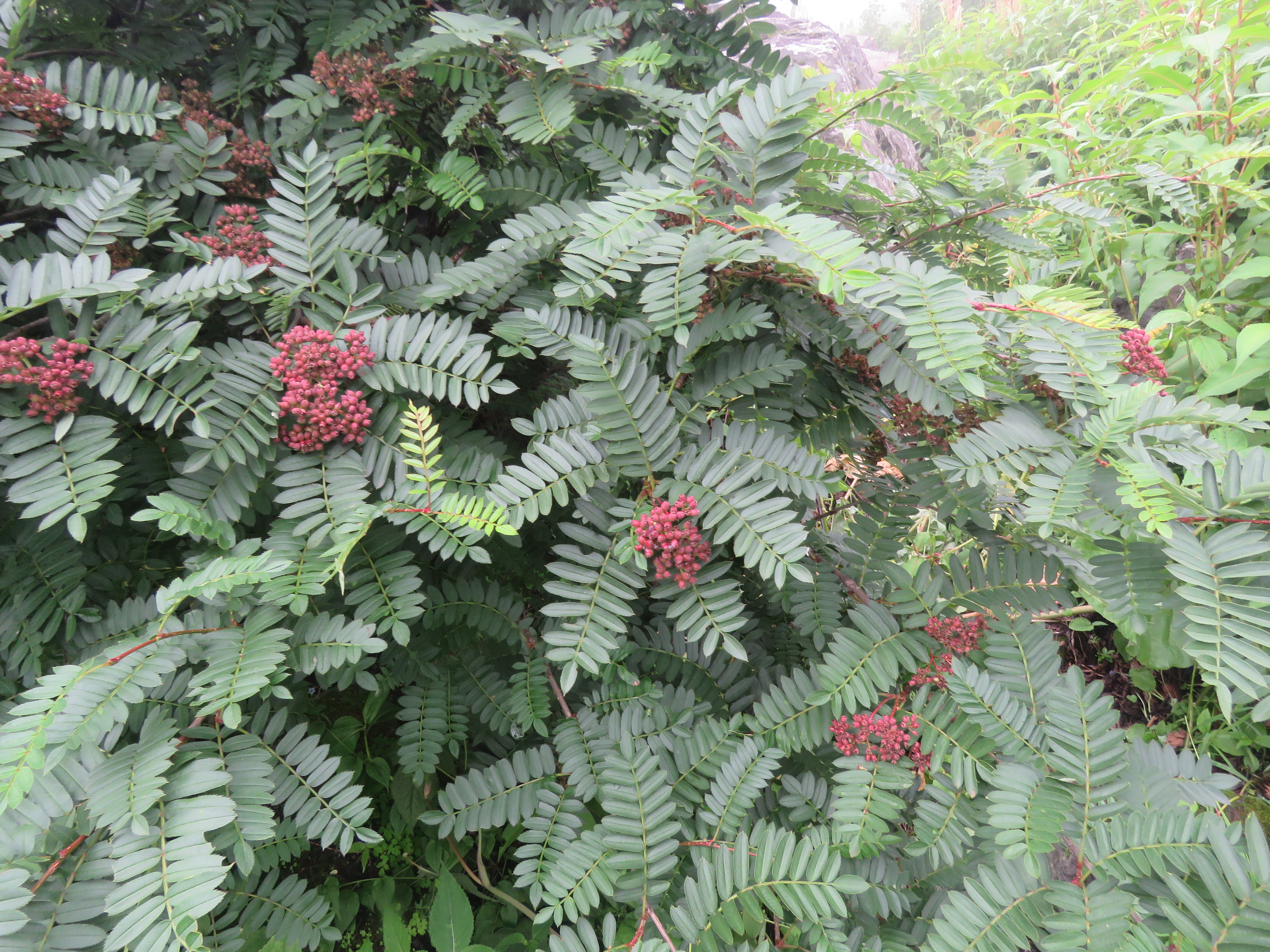

Conservation status
- Least Concern (IUCN 3.1)

Scientific classification
- Kingdom: Plantae
- Clade: Embryophytes
- Clade: Tracheophytes
- Clade: Spermatophytes
- Clade: Angiosperms
- Clade: Eudicots
- Clade: Rosids
- Order: Rosales
- Family: Rosaceae
- Genus: Sorbus
- Species: S. microphylla

Binomial name
- Sorbus microphylla (Wall. ex Hook.f.) Wenz.

Synonyms
- Pyrus microphylla (Wenz.) Wall. ex Hook.f.

= Sorbus microphylla =

Species of flowering plant

Sorbus microphylla, the small-leaf rowan, is a species of plant found in the Himalayas and China. It is probably a species aggregate. The berries are eaten by red pandas.
