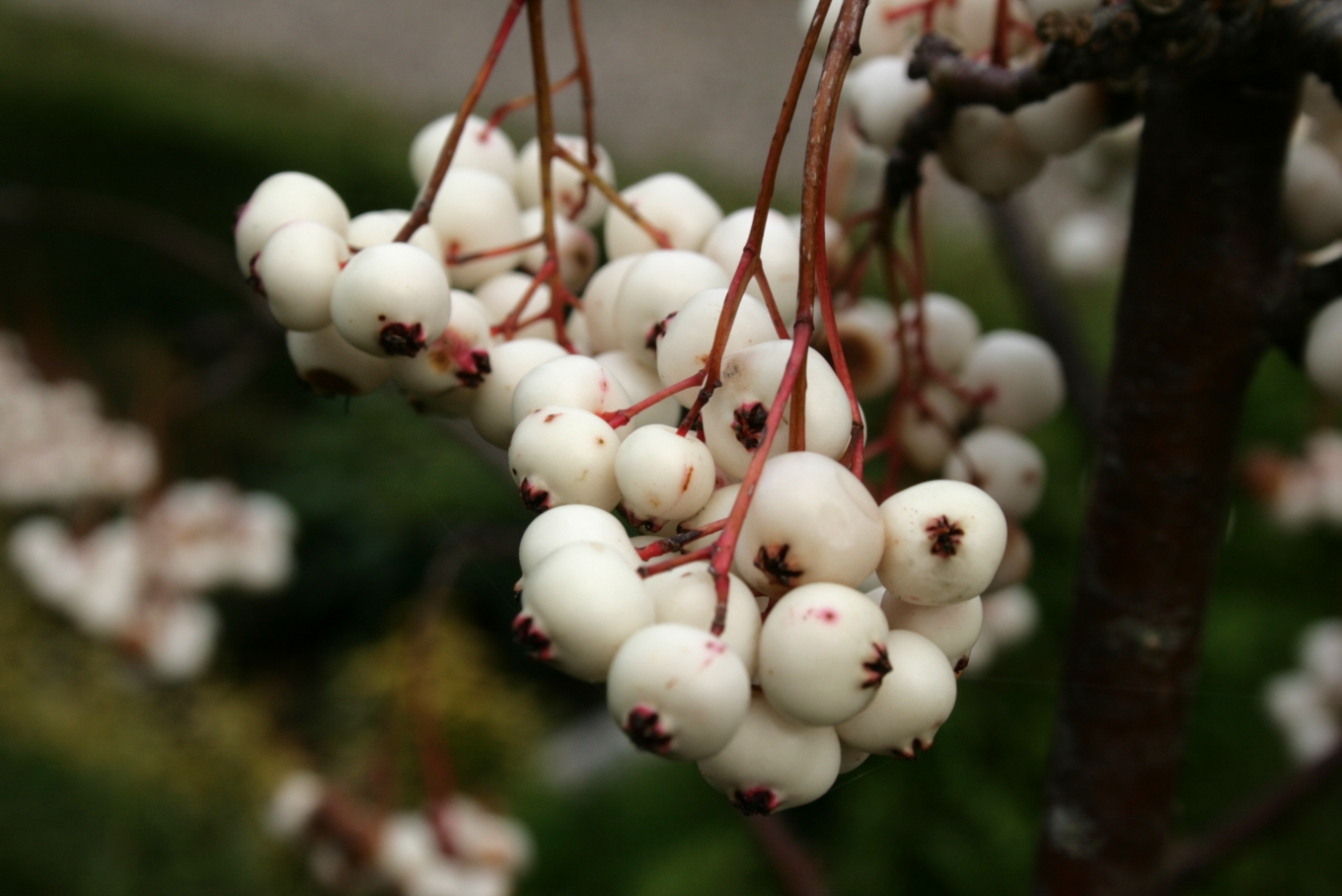
- Sorbus koehneana has white berries with red pedicels

Scientific classification
- Kingdom: Plantae
- Clade: Embryophytes
- Clade: Tracheophytes
- Clade: Spermatophytes
- Clade: Angiosperms
- Clade: Eudicots
- Clade: Rosids
- Order: Rosales
- Family: Rosaceae
- Genus: Sorbus
- Species: S. koehneana

Binomial name
- Sorbus koehneana C.K.Schneid.

Synonyms
- List: Pyrus koehneana (C.K.Schneid.) Cardot; Pyrus multijuga (Koehne) M.F.Fay & Christenh.; Sorbus multijuga Koehne; Sorbus unguiculata Koehne; Sorbus valbrayi H.Lév.

= Sorbus koehneana =

Species of flowering plant

Sorbus koehneana, also known as Koehne mountain ash, is a species of rowan native to central and southeast China and Qinghai. It is found in mixed forests or thickets in mountains 2,300 to 4,000 m above sea level. The species epithet is named after Bernhard Adalbert Emil Koehne, a late 19th century German botanist. Sorbus koehneana has white fruits and it's famous for the bright red color of its leaves in autumn.
