= List of trees of Canada =

This list compiles many of the common large shrubs and trees found in Canada. The Canadian flora is depauperate because of the near total glaciation event in the Pleistocene. Due to the vast area of Canada, a tree that is common in one area may be completely absent in another. In particular, many warm-temperate trees can only be grown on the mild pacific coast (where gardens may contain additional species not listed here).

See also provincial tree emblems of Canada for the official trees of the provinces and territories of Canada.

== Pinophyta (Conifers) ==
Abies (firs)

- Abies amabilis (Pacific Silver Fir)
- Abies balsamea (Balsam Fir)
- Abies bifolia (Rocky Mountains Subalpine Fir)
- Abies concolor (white fir) - introduced
- Abies grandis (Grand Fir)
- Abies lasiocarpa (Coast Range Subalpine Fir)
- Abies magnifica (Red Fir) - introduced
- Abies nordmanniana (Nordmann Fir) - introduced
- Abies pinsapo (Spanish Fir) - introduced
- Abies procera (Noble Fir) - introduced

Araucaria

- Araucaria araucana (Monkey-puzzle) - introduced

Cedrus (cedars)

- Cedrus atlantica (Atlas Cedar) - introduced
- Cedrus deodara (Deodar Cedar) - introduced
- Cedrus libani (Lebanon Cedar) - introduced

Chamaecyparis

- Chamaecyparis lawsoniana (Lawson's Cypress) - introduced
- Chamaecyparis obtusa (Hinoki Cypress) - introduced
- Chamaecyparis pisifera (Sawara Cypress) - introduced

Cryptomeria

- Cryptomeria japonica (Sugi) - introduced

Cupressus

- Cupressus arizonica (Arizona Cypress) - introduced
- Cupressus macrocarpa (Monterey Cypress) - introduced

Juniperus (junipers)

- Juniperus chinensis (Chinese Juniper) - introduced
- Juniperus communis (Common Juniper)
- Juniperus horizontalis (Creeping Juniper)
- Juniperus sabina (Savin Juniper) - introduced
- Juniperus scopulorum (Rocky Mountain juniper)
- Juniperus virginiana (Eastern Juniper)

Larix (larches)

- Larix decidua (European Larch) - introduced
- Larix gmelinii (Dahurian Larch) - introduced
- Larix kaempferi (Japanese Larch) - introduced
- Larix laricina (Tamarack Larch)
- Larix lyallii (Subalpine Larch)
- Larix occidentalis (Western Larch)
- Larix sibirica (Siberian Larche) - introduced

Metasequoia

- Metasequoia glyptostroboides (Dawn Redwood) - introduced

Picea (spruces)

- Picea abies (Norway Spruce) - introduced
- Picea engelmannii (Engelmann Spruce)
- Picea glauca (White Spruce)
- Picea mariana (Black Spruce)
- Picea omorika (Serbian Spruce) - introduced
- Picea pungens (Colorado Spruce) - introduced
- Picea rubens (Red Spruce)
- Picea sitchensis (Sitka Spruce)

Pinus (pines)

- Pinus albicaulis (Whitebark Pine)
- Pinus aristata (Bristlecone Pine) - introduced
- Pinus banksiana (Jack Pine)
- Pinus contorta subsp. contorta Shore Pine
- Pinus contorta subsp. latifolia Lodgepole Pine
- Pinus flexilis (Limber Pine)
- Pinus monticola (Western White Pine)
- Pinus mugo (Mountain Pine) - introduced
- Pinus nigra (European Black Pine) or Austrian Pine - introduced
- Pinus ponderosa (Ponderosa Pine)
- Pinus resinosa (Red Pine)
- Pinus rigida (Pitch Pine)
- Pinus strobus (eastern white pine)
- Pinus sylvestris (Scots Pine) - introduced

Platycladus

- Platycladus orientalis (Chinese Arborvitae) (previously known as Thuja orientalis) - introduced

Pseudotsuga

- Pseudotsuga menziesii subsp. menziesii (Coast Douglas-fir)
- Pseudotsuga menziesii subsp. glauca (Rocky Mountain Douglas-fir)

Sciadopitys

- Sciadopitys verticillata (Umbrella-pine) - introduced

Sequoia

- Sequoia sempervirens (Coast Redwood) - introduced

Sequoiadendron

- Sequoiadendron giganteum (Giant Sequoia) - introduced

Taxodium (cypresses)

- Taxodium distichum (Baldcypress) - introduced

Taxus (yews)

- Taxus baccata (English Yew) - introduced
- Taxus brevifolia (Western Yew)
- Taxus canadensis (Canada Yew)
- Taxus cuspidata (Japanese Yew) - introduced

Thuja (thujas)

- Thuja occidentalis (Eastern Arborvitae)
- Thuja plicata (Western Redcedar)

Tsuga (hemlocks)

- Tsuga canadensis (Eastern Hemlock)
- Tsuga heterophylla (Western Hemlock)
- Tsuga mertensiana (Mountain Hemlock)

Xanthocyparis

- Xanthocyparis nootkatensis (Nootka Cypress, Yellow-cedar) (previously included in Chamaecyparis)

== Ginkgophyta (Ginkgos) ==
Ginkgo

- Ginkgo biloba (Ginkgo) - introduced

== Magnoliophyta (Broadleaves) ==
Acer (maples)

- Acer circinatum (Vine maple)
- Acer × freemanii (Freeman's maple) (hybrid red maple × silver maple)
- Acer ginnala (Amur maple) - introduced
- Acer glabrum (Douglas maple)
- Acer macrophyllum (Bigleaf maple)
- Acer negundo (Manitoba maple or boxelder)
- Acer nigrum (Black maple)
- Acer palmatum (Japanese maple) - introduced
- Acer pensylvanicum (Striped maple)
- Acer platanoides (Norway maple) - introduced
- Acer pseudoplatanus (Sycamore maple) - introduced
- Acer rubrum (Red maple)
- Acer saccharinum (Silver maple)
- Acer saccharum (Sugar maple)
- Acer spicatum (Mountain maple)

Aesculus (buckeyes and horse-chestnuts)

- Aesculus × carnea (Red Horse-chestnut) - introduced
- Aesculus glabra (Ohio Buckeye)
- Aesculus hippocastanum (Common Horse-chestnut) - introduced

Ailanthus

- Ailanthus altissima (Ailanthus) - introduced

Alnus (alders)

- Alnus glutinosa (Black alder) - introduced
- Alnus incana (Speckled alder)
- Alnus rubra (Red alder)
- Alnus serrulata (Hazel alder)
- Alnus viridis (Green alder)

Amelanchier (serviceberries)

- Amelanchier alnifolia (Juneberry or Saskatoon berry)
- Amelanchier arborea (Downy serviceberry)
- Amelanchier bartramiana (Mountain serviceberry)
- Amelanchier florida (Pacific serviceberry)
- Amelanchier laevis (Smooth serviceberry)
- Amelanchier sanguinea (Roundleaf serviceberry)

Aralia

- Aralia elata (Japanese angelica-tree) - introduced

Arbutus

- Arbutus menziesii (Pacific Madrone)

Asimina

- Asimina triloba (Pawpaw)

Betula (birches)

- Betula alleghaniensis (Yellow Birch)
- Betula cordifolia (Mountain Paper Birch)
- Betula kenaica (Kenai Paper Birch)
- Betula lenta (Cherry Birch)
- Betula neoalaskana (Alaska Paper Birch)
- Betula occidentalis (Water Birch)
- Betula papyrifera (Paper Birch)
- Betula pendula (Silver Birch) - introduced
- Betula populifolia (Gray Birch)

Caragana

- Caragana arborescens (Siberian pea-tree) - introduced

Carpinus (hornbeams)

- Carpinus betulus (European Hornbeam) - introduced
- Carpinus caroliniana (American Hornbeam)

Carya (hickories)

- Carya cordiformis (Bitternut Hickory)
- Carya glabra (Pignut Hickory)
- Carya laciniosa (Shellbark Hickory)
- Carya ovata (Shagbark Hickory)

Castanea (chestnuts)

- Castanea dentata (American Chestnut)
- Castanea mollissima (Chinese Chestnut) - introduced

Catalpa (catalpas)

- Catalpa bignonioides (Southern catalpa) - introduced
- Catalpa ovata (Japanese catalpa) - introduced
- Catalpa speciosa (Northern catalpa) - introduced

Celtis (hackberries)

- Celtis occidentalis (Hackberry)
- Celtis tenuifolia (Dwarf hackberry)

Cephalanthus

- Cephalanthus occidentalis (Button-bush))

Cercidiphyllum

- Cercidiphyllum japonicum (Katsura-tree) - introduced

Cercis

- Cercis canadensis (Redbud)

Cladrastis

- Cladrastis kentukea (Yellow-wood) - introduced

Cornus (dogwoods)

- Cornus alternifolia (Alternate-leaved dogwood)
- Cornus florida (Flowering Dogwood)
- Cornus kousa (Kousa Dogwood) - introduced
- Cornus mas (European Cornel) - introduced
- Cornus nuttallii (Pacific Dogwood)

Corylus (hazels )

- Corylus americana (American Hazel)
- Corylus avellana (Common hazel) - introduced
- Corylus colurna (Turkish Hazel) - introduced
- Corylus cornuta (Beaked Hazel)
- Corylus maxima (Filbert) - introduced

Cotinus

- Cotinus coggygria (Smokebush) - introduced

Crataegus (Hawthorns) - too many species to list.

Elaeagnus

- Elaeagnus angustifolia (Russian-olive) - introduced
- Elaeagnus commutata (Silverberry)

Euonymus (Euonymus)

- Euonymus alatus (Winged euonymus) - introduced
- Euonymus atropurpureus (Burning-bush) euonymus
- Euonymus europaeus (European spindle) - introduced
- Euonymus fortunei (Winter-creeper euonymus) - introduced

Fagus (beeches)

- Fagus grandifolia (American Beech)
- Fagus sylvatica (European beech) - introduced

Fraxinus (ashes)

- Fraxinus americana (White Ash)
- Fraxinus excelsior (European Ash) - introduced
- Fraxinus latifolia (Oregon Ash)
- Fraxinus nigra (Black Ash)
- Fraxinus pennsylvanica (Green Ash)
- Fraxinus profunda (Pumpkin Ash)
- Fraxinus quadrangulata (Blue Ash)

Gleditsia

- Gleditsia triacanthos (Honey-locust)

Gymnocladus

- Gymnocladus dioicus (Kentucky coffee-tree)

Hamamelis

- Hamamelis virginiana (Witch-hazel)

Hippophae

- Hippophae rhamnoides (Sea-buckthorn) - introduced

Ilex (hollies)

- Ilex aquifolium (English Holly) - introduced
- Ilex mucronata (Mountain Holly; syn. Nemopanthus mucronatus)
- Ilex opaca (American Holly) - introduced
- Ilex verticillata (Common Winterberry)

Juglans (walnuts)

- Juglans cinerea (Butternut)
- Juglans nigra (Black Walnut)
- Juglans regia (Persian Walnut) - introduced

Laburnum

- Laburnum anagyroides (Laburnum) - introduced

Liquidambar

- Liquidambar styraciflua (sweetgum) - introduced

Liriodendron

- Liriodendron tulipifera (tulip tree)

Maclura

- Maclura pomifera (Osage-orange) - introduced

Magnolia (magnolias)

- Magnolia acuminata (Cucumber tree)
- Magnolia × soulangeana (Saucer magnolia) - introduced

Malus (apples)

- Malus baccata (Siberian crab apple) - introduced
- Malus coronaria (Wild crab apple)
- Malus fusca (Pacific crab apple)
- Malus sylvestris (Common apple) - introduced

Morus (mulberries)

- Morus alba (White Mulberry) - introduced
- Morus rubra (Red Mulberry)

Myrica

- Myrica californica (Pacific bayberry)

Nemopanthus – see Ilex

Nyssa (tupelos)

- Nyssa sylvatica (Black tupelo)

Ostrya

- Ostrya virginiana (American hornbeam or Ironwood)

Phellodendron

- Phellodendron amurense (Amur cork-tree) - introduced

Platanus (planes)

- Platanus × hispanica (London plane) - introduced
- Platanus occidentalis (American sycamore)

Populus (poplars, balsam poplars, aspens, cottonwoods)

- Populus × acuminata (Lanceleaf cottonwood)
- Populus alba (White Poplar) - introduced
- Populus angustifolia (Narrowleaf cottonwood)
- Populus balsamifera (Eastern Balsam Poplar)
- Populus × canadensis (Carolina poplar) - introduced
- Populus deltoides (Eastern Cottonwood)
- Populus grandidentata (Bigtooth Aspen)
- Populus heterophylla (Swamp cottonwood)
- Populus × jackii (Jack's hybrid poplar)
- Populus nigra (Black Poplar, Lombardy poplar) - introduced
- Populus simonii (Simon's poplar) - introduced
- Populus tremuloides (Trembling Aspen)
- Populus trichocarpa (Black Cottonwood)

Prunus (cherries, plums, peaches)

- Prunus americana (American plum)
- Prunus armeniaca (Apricot) - introduced
- Prunus avium (Sweet cherry) - introduced
- Prunus cerasus (Sour cherry) - introduced
- Prunus emarginata (Bitter cherry)
- Prunus maackii (Amur chokecherry) - introduced
- Prunus nigra (Canada plum)
- Prunus pensylvanica (Pin cherry)
- Prunus serotina (Black cherry)
- Prunus serrulata (Japanese flowering cherry) - introduced
- Prunus virginiana (Chokecherry)

Ptelea

- Ptelea trifoliata (Hoptree)

Pyrus (pears)

- Pyrus communis (Common pear)

Quercus (oaks)

- Quercus alba (white oak)
- Quercus bicolor (Swamp white oak)
- Quercus coccinea (Scarlet oak)
- Quercus ellipsoidalis (Northern pin oak)
- Quercus garryana (Garry oak)
- Quercus ilicifolia (Bear oak)
- Quercus imbricaria (Shingle oak)
- Quercus macrocarpa (Bur oak)
- Quercus montana (Chestnut oak)
- Quercus muehlenbergii (Chinquapin oak)
- Quercus palustris (Pin oak)
- Quercus prinoides (Dwarf chinquapin oak)
- Quercus robur (English oak) - introduced
- Quercus rubra (Northern red oak)
- Quercus shumardii (Shumard oak)
- Quercus velutina (Black oak)

Rhamnus (buckthorns)

- Rhamnus cathartica (European buckthorn) - introduced
- Rhamnus frangula (Glossy buckthorn) - introduced
- Rhamnus purshiana (Cascara buckthorn)

Rhododendron (rhododendrons)

- Rhododendron macrophyllum (Pacific rhododendron)
- Rhododendron maximum (Rosebay rhododendron) - introduced
- Rhododendron ponticum (Pontic rhododendron) - introduced

Rhus (sumacs)

- Rhus copallina (Shining sumac)
- Rhus glabra (Smooth sumac)
- Rhus typhina (Staghorn sumac)

Robinia

- Robinia pseudoacacia (Black locust) - introduced

Sassafras

- Sassafras albidum (Sassafras)

Salix (willows) - too many species to list.

Sambucus (elder)

- Sambucus callicarpa (Red-berry elder)
- Sambucus canadensis (American elder)
- Sambucus cerulea (Blue-berry elder)
- Sambucus melanocarpa (Black-berry elder)
- Sambucus pubens (Eastern red-berry elder)

Shepherdia

- Shepherdia argentea (Silver buffalo-berry)

Sorbus (rowans)

- Sorbus americana (American Rowan or mountain-ash)
- Sorbus aucuparia (European rowan) - introduced
- Sorbus decora (Showy Rowan or mountain-ash)
- Sorbus sitchensis (Sitka Rowan or mountain-ash)

Syringa

- Syringa vulgaris (Common lilac)

Tilia (lindens)

- Tilia americana (Basswood)
- Tilia cordata (Little-leaf linden) - introduced
- Tilia tomentosa (Silver linden) - introduced

Toxicodendron

- Toxicodendron vernix (Poison-sumac)

Ulmus (elms)

- Ulmus americana (American elm or White elm)
- Ulmus glabra (Wych elm) - introduced
- Ulmus procera (English elm) - introduced
- Ulmus pumila (Siberian elm) - introduced
- Ulmus rubra (Slippery elm)
- Ulmus thomasii (Rock elm)

Viburnum (viburnums)

- Viburnum edule (Squashberry)
- Viburnum lantana (Wayfaring-tree) - introduced
- Viburnum lentago (Sweet viburnum, nannyberry)
- Viburnum opulus (Wayfaring tree) - introduced
- Viburnum trilobum (Highbush cranberry)

Zanthoxylum (Zanthoxylums, prickly-ashes)

- Zanthoxylum americanum (Common prickly-ash)
- Zanthoxylum clava-herculis (Southern prickly-ash)

Zelkova

- Zelkova serrata (Japanese zelkova) - introduced

== See also ==
- List of trees of Quebec
