= List of trees of Quebec =

Tree species found in Quebec, Canada

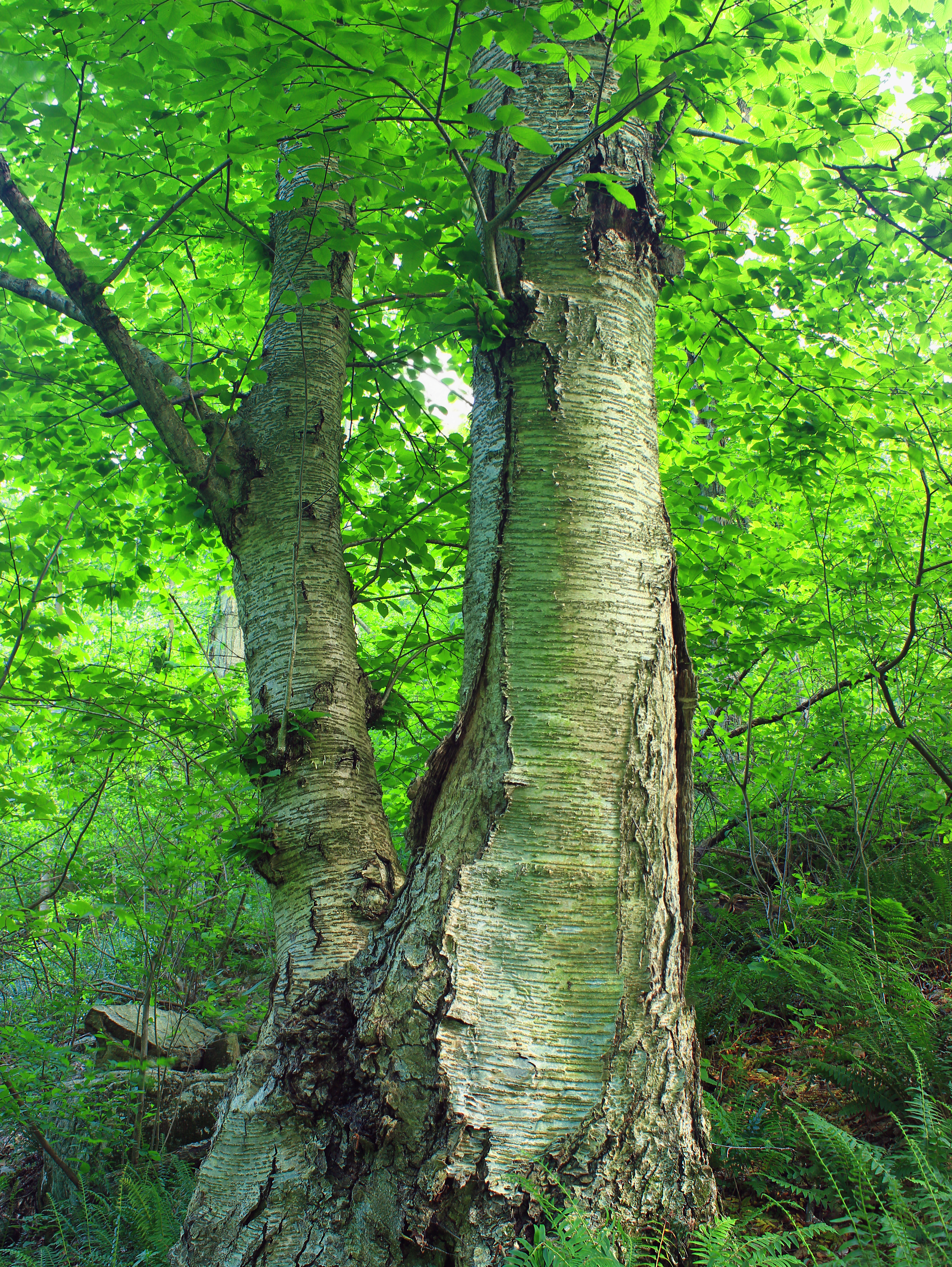
The yellow birch is Quebec's tree emblem.

Different forest areas of Quebec: 1. Middle Arctic Tundra; 2. Low Arctic Tundra; 3. Torngat Mountain Tundra; 4. Eastern Canadian Shield Taiga; 5. Southern Hudson Bay Taiga; 6. Central Canadian Shield Forests; 7. Eastern Canadian Forests; 8. Eastern Forest/Boreal Transition; 9. Eastern Great Lakes Lowland Forests; 10. New England/Acadian Forests; 11. Gulf of St. Lawrence Lowland Forests

This list catalogs the trees in Quebec. It includes 140 tree species, of which 99 are native, 40 are introduced, and one is extirpated, the Smooth sumac.

The list is based on two sources: Trees of Canada, 2017 by John Laird Farrar and VASCAN, the Database of Vascular Plants of Canada. For each species, the binomial name is given followed by the author citation, the common name, and its status in the province: native, introduced, or extirpated. The common names and status come from VASCAN. The status – native or introduced – specifically concerns the territory of Quebec: a species may be introduced or naturalized in the province but native elsewhere in Canada.

== Order Pinales ==
=== Family Cupressaceae ===
- Juniperus communis (L.), 1753 / Common Juniper / Native
- Juniperus horizontalis (Moench), 1794 / Creeping Juniper / Native
- Juniperus virginiana (L.), 1753 / Eastern Red Cedar / Native
- Thuja occidentalis (L.), 1753 / Eastern White Cedar / Native

=== Family Pinaceae ===
- Pinus strobus (L.), 1753 / Eastern white pine / native
- Pinus rigida (Mill.), 1768 / Pitch Pine / Native
- Pinus resinosa (Aiton), 1789 / Red Pine / Native
- Pinus banksiana (Lamb.), 1803 / Jack Pine / Native
- Pinus sylvestris (L.), 1753 / Scots Pine / Introduced
- Pinus nigra R. (Legay), 1785 / Austrian Pine / Introduced
- Pinus mugo Turra, 1764 / Mountain Pine / Introduced
- Larix laricina (Du Roi) K.Koch, 1873 / Tamarack / Native
- Larix decidua Mill., 1768 / European Larch / Introduced
- Abies balsamea (L.) Mill., 1768 / Balsam Fir / Native
- Picea glauca (Moench) Voss, 1907 / White Spruce / Native
- Picea rubens (Sarg.), 1898 / Red Spruce / Native
- Picea mariana Mill.,Briton, Sterns & Poggenburg / Black Spruce / Native
- Picea abies (L.) H. Karst, 1881 / Norway Spruce / Introduced
- Tsuga canadensis (L.) Carrière, 1855 / Eastern Hemlock / Native
- Taxus canadensis (Marshall), 1785 / Canada Yew / Native

== Order Sapindales ==
=== Family Sapindaceae ===
- Acer saccharum (Marsh.), 1785 / Sugar Maple / Native
- Acer nigrum (L.), 1753 / Black Maple / Native
- Acer rubrum (L.), 1753 / Red Maple / Native
- Acer saccharinum (L.), 1753 / Silver Maple / Native
- Acer negundo (L.), 1753 / Manitoba Maple / Introduced
- Acer spicatum Lam. / Mountain Maple / Native
- Acer pensylvanicum (L.), 1753 / Striped Maple / Native
- Acer platanoides (L.), 1753 / Norway Maple / Introduced
- Acer ginnala (Maxim.) Wesm., 1890 / Amur Maple / Introduced
- Aesculus hippocastanum (L.), 1753 / Horse Chestnut / Introduced
- Phellodendron amurense (Rupr.), 1857 / Amur Cork Tree / Introduced

=== Family Rutaceae ===
- Zanthoxylum americanum Mill., 1768 / Northern Prickly Ash / Native
- Ptelea trifoliata (L.), 1753 / Hop Tree / Introduced

=== Family Anacardiaceae ===
- Rhus glabra L. / Smooth Sumac / Extirpated
- Rhus typhina L., 1756 / Staghorn Sumac / Native
- Toxicodendron vernix Stokes F.Barkley / Poison Sumac / Native

=== Family Simaroubaceae ===
- Ailanthus altissima (Mill.) Swingle, 1916 / Tree of Heaven / Introduced

== Order Lamiales or Scrophulariales ==
=== Family Oleaceae ===
- Fraxinus americana (L.), 1753 / White Ash / Native
- Fraxinus pennsylvanica (Marshall) / Red Ash / Native
- Fraxinus nigra Marshall, 1785 / Black Ash / Native
- Syringa vulgaris Linné, 1753 / Common Lilac / Introduced

== Order Dipsacales ==
=== Family Caprifoliaceae ===
- Sambucus canadensis L., 1753 / American Elder / Native
- Sambucus racemosa L., 1753 / Red Elder / Native
- Viburnum lentago L., 1753 / Nannyberry / Native
- Viburnum opulus L., 1753 / European Cranberry Bush / Introduced
- Viburnum lantana L., 1753 / Wayfaring Tree / Introduced
- Viburnum edule (Michx.) Raf., 1808 / Squashberry / Native
- Viburnum trilobum Marshall / American Cranberrybush / Native

== Order Cornales ==
=== Family Cornaceae ===
- Cornus alternifolia L., 1758 / Alternate-leaved Dogwood / Native

== Order Celastrales ==
=== Family Celastraceae ===
- Euonymus europaeus L. 1753 / European Spindle / Introduced
- Euonymus alatus (Thunb.) Siebold / Winged Spindle / Introduced

== Order Gentianales ==
=== Family Rubiaceae ===
- Cephalanthus occidentalis L., 1753 / Buttonbush / Native

== Order Rosales ==
=== Family Elaeagnaceae ===
- Shepherdia argentea (Pursh) Nutt., 1818 / Silver Buffaloberry / Introduced
- Shepherdia canadensis (L.) Nutt. / Canada Buffaloberry / Native
- Hippophae rhamnoides L., 1753 / Sea Buckthorn / Introduced
- Elaeagnus angustifolia L., 1753 / Russian Olive / Introduced
- Elaeagnus commutata Bernhardi ex Rydberg, 1917 / Silverberry / Native

=== Family Rosaceae ===
- Sorbus decora C.K.Schneid. / Showy Mountain Ash / Native
- Sorbus americana Marsh., 1785 / American mountain ash / Native
- Sorbus aucuparia L., 1753 / European Mountain Ash / Introduced
- Amelanchier arborea (F.Michx.) Fernald, 1941 / Downy Serviceberry / Native
- Amelanchier laevis Wiegand, 1912 / Smooth Serviceberry / Native
- Amelanchier sanguinea (Pursh) DC., 1825 / Roundleaf Serviceberry / Native
- Amelanchier bartramiana (Tausch) M.Roem., 1847 / Bartram's Serviceberry / Native
- Malus sylvestris (L.) Mill. 1768 / European Crab Apple / Introduced
- Prunus cerasus L., 1753 / Sour Cherry / Introduced
- Prunus pensylvanica L.f., 1782 / Pin Cherry / Native
- Prunus serotina Ehrh., 1788 / Black Cherry / Native
- Prunus virginiana L., 1753 / Choke Cherry / Native
- Prunus nigra Aiton, 1789 / Canada Plum / Native
- Prunus americana Marshall, 1785 / American Plum / Introduced
- Crataegus chrysocarpa Ashe, 1900 / Fireberry Hawthorn / Native
- Crataegus punctata Jacq. / Dotted Hawthorn / Native
- Crataegus mollis (Torr. & A.Gray) Scheele, 1848 / Downy Hawthorn / Native
- Crataegus crus-galli L., 1753 / Cockspur Hawthorn / Native
- Crataegus coccinea L., 1753 / Scarlet Hawthorn / Native
- Crataegus succulenta ader (Schrad. ex Link / Fleshy Hawthorn / Native
- Crataegus flabellata (Bosc ex Spach) Rydb. / Fanleaf Hawthorn / Native
- Crataegus monogyna Jacq., 1775 / Common Hawthorn / Introduced

== Order Juglandales ==
=== Family Juglandaceae ===
- Juglans cinerea (L.), 1759 / Butternut / Native
- Juglans nigra (L.), 1753 / Black Walnut / Introduced
- Carya ovata (Mill.) K.Koch, 1869 / Shagbark Hickory / Native
- Carya cordiformis (Wangenh.) K.Koch, 1869 / Bitternut Hickory / Native

== Order Fabales ==
=== Family Fabaceae ===
- Robinia pseudoacacia (L.), 1753 / Black Locust / Introduced
- Caragana arborescens (Fabr.) / Siberian Pea Shrub / Introduced

== Order Urticales ==
=== Family Moraceae ===
- Morus alba (L.), 1753 / White Mulberry / Introduced

=== Family Ulmaceae ===
- Ulmus americana L., 1753 / American elm / Native
- Ulmus thomasii Sarg., 1902 / Rock Elm / Native
- Ulmus rubra Muhl., 1793 / Slippery Elm / Native
- Ulmus pumila L. / Siberian Elm / Introduced
- Celtis occidentalis L., (1753) / Hackberry / Native

== Order Hamamelidales ==
=== Family Platanaceae ===
- Platanus occidentalis (L.), 1753 / American Sycamore / Native

== Order Fagales ==
=== Family Fagaceae ===
- Quercus rubra L., 1753 / Northern Red Oak / Native
- Quercus alba L., 1753 / White Oak / Native
- Quercus macrocarpa Michx. / Bur Oak / Native
- Quercus bicolor Willd., 1801 / Swamp White Oak / Native
- Fagus grandifolia Ehrh., 1788 / American Beech / Native

=== Family Betulaceae ===
- Betula papyrifera Marshall, 1785 / Paper Birch / Native
- Betula cordifolia Regel, 1861 / Mountain Paper Birch / Native
- Betula xcaerulea-grandis Blanchard / Blueleaf Birch / Native
- Betula populifolia Marshall, 1785 / Gray Birch / Native
- Betula alleghaniensis Britton, 1904 / Yellow Birch / Native
- Alnus incana (L.) Moench 1794 / Speckled Alder / Native
- Alnus viridis subsp. crispa (Aiton) Raus / Green Alder / Native
- Alnus serrulata (Aiton) Willd. / Smooth Alder / Native
- Carpinus caroliniana Walter, 1788 / American Hornbeam / Native
- Ostrya virginiana (Mill.) K.Koch / Eastern Hophornbeam / Native
- Corylus cornuta Marshall, 1785 / Beaked Hazelnut / Native
- Corylus americana Marshall, 1785 / American Hazelnut / Native

== Order Hamamelidales ==
=== Family Hamamelidaceae ===
- Hamamelis virginiana (L.), 1753 / American Witch Hazel / Native

== Order Celastrales ==
=== Family Aquifoliaceae ===
- Ilex verticillata (L.) A.Gray / Winterberry / Native
- Ilex mucronata (L.) M.Powell, Savol. & S.Andrews, 2000 / Mountain Holly / Native

== Order Rhamnales ==
=== Family Rhamnaceae ===
- Rhamnus cathartica (L.), 1753 / Common Buckthorn / Introduced
- Frangula alnus (Mill.), 1768 / Glossy Buckthorn / Introduced

== Order Malvales ==
=== Family Tiliaceae ===
- Tilia americana (L.), 1753 / American Basswood / Native

== Order Salicales ==
=== Family Salicaceae ===
- Salix amygdaloides Andersson / Peachleaf Willow / Native
- Salix bebbiana Sarg., 1895 / Bebb Willow / Native
- Salix arbusculoides Andersson / Little Tree Willow / Native
- Salix discolor Muhl. / Pussy Willow / Native
- Salix pyrifolia Andersson / Balsam Willow / Native
- Salix lucida var. lucida Muhl. / Shining Willow / Native
- Salix pentandra L. / Bay Willow / Introduced
- Salix nigra Marshall, 1785 / Black Willow / Native
- Salix fragilis L., 1753 / Crack Willow / Introduced
- Salix alba L., 1753 / White Willow / Introduced
- Salix alaxensis Andersson, Coville / Felt-leaf Willow / Native
- Salix petiolaris Sm. / Meadow Willow / Native
- Salix eriocephala Michx., 1803 / Missouri Willow / Native
- Salix pellita Anders. 1891 / Satiny Willow / Native
- Salix viminalis L., 1753 / Basket Willow / Introduced
- Salix purpurea L., 1753 / Purple Willow / Introduced
- Salix daphnoides Vill. 1779 / European Violet Willow / Introduced
- Populus balsamifera L., 1753 / Balsam Poplar / Native
- Populus ×jackii Sarg. / Jack's Hybrid Poplar / Native
- Populus deltoides W. Bartram ex Marshall, 1785 / Eastern Cottonwood / Native
- Populus tremuloides Michx., 1803 / Quaking Aspen / Native
- Populus grandidentata Michx., 1803 / Bigtooth Aspen / Native
- Populus nigra L., 1753 / Black Poplar / Introduced
- Populus alba L., 1753 / White Poplar / Introduced
- Populus ×canadensis Moench, 1785 / Carolina Poplar / Native

== See also ==
- List of trees of Canada
- Ecological regions of Quebec
- List of lakes of Quebec
- List of rivers of Quebec
- Forests of Canada
- List of mammals of Quebec
- List of reptiles of Quebec
- List of amphibians of Quebec
- List of birds of Quebec
- Exceptional forest ecosystems of Quebec
