= List of mammals of Quebec =

This list of mammals in Quebec is based on the "List of vertebrate fauna of Quebec". It includes species that have disappeared in recent history and introduced species. It contains 97 species in nine orders: one species of didelphimorphs, ten species of insectivores, eight species of chiropterans, three species of lagomorphs, 25 species of rodents, 21 species of fissipeds, five species of artiodactyls, seven species of pinnipeds, and 17 species of cetaceans.

This list is focused on wild mammals only. As such, humans, domesticated mammals and exotic pets are not included.

== Didelphimorphia ==
Photo	Names (English / Scientific)	IUCN Status	Notes	Range Map
Family Didelphidae
	Virginia opossum Didelphis virginiana	LC	The only marsupial in North America. Poorly adapted to Quebec winters, it can disappear completely from the northern part of its range during harsh winters until individuals from the south recolonize the territory.	

== Insectivora ==
Photo	Names (English / Scientific)	IUCN Status	Notes	Range Map
Family Soricidae
	Cinereus shrew Sorex cinereus	LC	The most widespread shrew in Quebec and North America. Often also the most abundant in the habitats it occupies, particularly in the boreal forest.	
	Smoky shrew Sorex fumeus	LC		
	Arctic shrew Sorex arcticus	LC	The distribution of this species corresponds largely to the boreal forest.	
	Long-tailed shrew Sorex dispar	LC	This species is likely to be designated threatened or vulnerable by the MFFP.	
Missing illustration	Gaspé shrew Sorex gaspensis	NE	Rare, this shrew is also the only endemic to Canada. In Quebec, it is found in the regions of Gaspésie, Chaudière-Appalaches and Estrie. It is likely to be designated threatened or vulnerable.	
	American water shrew Sorex palustris	LC	This shrew has an extensive range, but it is not abundant and rarely observed.	
Missing illustration	American pygmy shrew Sorex hoyi	LC	The smallest mammal in eastern Canada. Although its range is vast, this shrew is rare.	
	Northern short-tailed shrew Blarina brevicauda	LC	Common within its range.	
Family Talpidae
	Hairy-tailed mole Parascalops breweri	LC		
	Star-nosed mole Condylura cristata	LC	The most northern of the North American moles.	

== Chiroptera ==
Photo	Names (English / Scientific)	IUCN Status	Notes	Range Map
Family Vespertilionidae
	Little brown bat Myotis lucifugus	LC	COSEWIC considers this species as endangered.	
	Northern long-eared bat Myotis septentrionalis	LC	COSEWIC considers this species as endangered.	
	Eastern small-footed bat Myotis leibii	LC	This species is likely to be designated threatened or vulnerable by the MFFP.	
	Tricolored bat Perimyotis subflavus	LC	COSEWIC considers this species as endangered. The MFFP considers it likely to be designated threatened or vulnerable.	
	Silver-haired bat Lasionycteris noctivagans	LC	Migratory species. This species is likely to be designated threatened or vulnerable by the MFFP.	
	Eastern red bat Lasiurus borealis	LC	Migratory species. This species is likely to be designated threatened or vulnerable by the MFFP.	
	Hoary bat Lasiurus cinereus	LC	Migratory species. This species is likely to be designated threatened or vulnerable by the MFFP.	
	Big brown bat Eptesicus fuscus	LC		

== Lagomorpha ==
Photo	Names (English / Scientific)	IUCN Status	Notes	Range Map
Family Leporidae
	Eastern cottontail Sylvilagus floridanus	LC	Expanding in southern Quebec.	
	Snowshoe hare Lepus americanus	LC	Introduced to Anticosti Island during the winter of 1902-1903.	
	Arctic hare Lepus arcticus	LC		

== Rodentia ==
Photo	Names (English / Scientific)	IUCN Status	Notes	Range Map
Family Sciuridae
	Eastern chipmunk Tamias striatus	LC		
	Least chipmunk Tamias minimus	LC		
	Groundhog; Marmota monax	LC		
	Eastern gray squirrel Sciurus carolinensis	LC	The Eastern gray squirrel has been introduced to various locations in western North America, England, Scotland, Ireland, Italy and South Africa.	
	American red squirrel Tamiasciurus hudsonicus	LC		
	Southern flying squirrel Glaucomys volans	LC	This species is likely to be designated threatened or vulnerable by the MFFP.	
	Northern flying squirrel Glaucomys sabrinus	LC		
Family Castoridae
	North American beaver Castor canadensis	LC	Introduced to Anticosti Island in 1890, in the Haida Gwaii archipelago, in Finland (1937), in the Kamchatka peninsula, in Poland, in Tierra del Fuego (1948), in Argentina and in France (1970s).	
Family Cricetidae
	Deer mouse Peromyscus maniculatus	LC	This species occupies a large part of North America and is abundant. It is found in a great variety of habitats. Its swimming abilities have allowed it to colonize several islands.	
	White-footed mouse Peromyscus leucopus	LC		
	Southern red-backed vole Myodes gapperi	LC		
Missing illustration	Eastern heather vole Phenacomys ungava	LC	The taxonomy of this species is subject to controversy. Some consider P. ungava as an integral part of P. intermedius.	
	Woodland vole Microtus pinetorum	LC	Present only in southern Estrie and Montérégie. The MFFP considers this species likely to be designated threatened or vulnerable. COSEWIC considers the status of this species as special concern.	
	Meadow vole Microtus pennsylvanicus	LC	Extensive distribution. Present throughout Quebec.	
	Rock vole Microtus chrotorrhinus	LC	This species is likely to be designated threatened or vulnerable by the MFFP.	
	Muskrat; Ondatra zibethicus	LC	Introduced to Anticosti Island in 1930.	
	Southern bog lemming Synaptomys cooperi	LC	This species is likely to be designated threatened or vulnerable by the MFFP.	
Missing illustration	Northern bog lemming Synaptomys borealis	LC		
	Ungava collared lemming Dicrostonyx hudsonius	LC	Endemic to the Quebec-Labrador peninsula.	
Family Muridae
	Brown rat Rattus norvegicus	LC	Originally from East Asia, the Brown rat has colonized all continents except Antarctica. It is estimated to have appeared in North America around 1750. Distribution in northern regions is fluctuating given that winter cold often decimates populations, but these are constantly renewed with the reintroduction of new individuals via maritime transport.	
	Black rat Rattus rattus	LC	Originally from Asia, like the Brown rat, the Black rat has colonized all continents except Antarctica via maritime transport. In Quebec, it is found only in the Port of Montreal where its presence is increasing.	
	House mouse Mus musculus	LC	Originally from the Old World, the House mouse was introduced to Canada during the 17th century.	
Family Dipodidae
	Meadow jumping mouse Zapus hudsonius	LC		
	Woodland jumping mouse Napaeozapus insignis	LC		
Family Erethizontidae
	North American porcupine Erethizon dorsatum	LC		

== Carnivora ==
Photo	Names (English / Scientific)	IUCN Status	Notes	Range Map
Family Canidae
	Coyote; Canis latrans	LC	In constant expansion since European colonization. The first mention in Quebec comes from Luskville in the municipality of Pontiac in 1944.	
	Gray wolf Canis lupus	LC	COSEWIC considers the Eastern wolf (C. l. lycaon) as threatened. Formerly present throughout Quebec, it was decimated from regions south of the St. Lawrence River during the second half of the 19th century.	
	Arctic fox Vulpes lagopus	LC	The Arctic fox has the most insulating fur of all mammals.	
	Red fox Vulpes vulpes	LC		
	Gray fox Urocyon cinereoargenteus	LC	COSEWIC considers this species as threatened.	
Family Ursidae
	American black bear Ursus americanus	LC	Once abundant on Anticosti Island, the American black bear is now extinct there.	
	Polar bear Ursus maritimus	VU	MFFP considers the Polar bear as vulnerable. COSEWIC considers the status of this species as special concern.	
	Grizzly bear Ursus arctos	LC	A now extinct population of Grizzly bear once occupied northern Quebec and Labrador until the beginning of the twentieth century.	
Family Procyonidae
	Raccoon; Procyon lotor	LC	Introduced to the Haida Gwaii archipelago, Prince Edward Island, Grand Manan Island, Europe and Russia.	
Family Mustelidae
	American marten Martes americana	LC	Disappeared from Anticosti Island at the beginning of the 20th century.	
	Fisher; Martes pennanti	LC		
	Stoat; Mustela erminea	LC		
	Least weasel Mustela nivalis	LC	This species is likely to be designated threatened or vulnerable by the MFFP.	
	Long-tailed weasel Mustela frenata	LC		
	American mink Neovison vison	LC	Introduced to South America, Europe and Asia.	
	Wolverine; Gulo gulo	LC	COSEWIC considers the status of the Wolverine as special concern. In Quebec, the range and abundance have greatly diminished from the 19th century.	
	North American river otter Lontra canadensis	LC		
Family Mephitidae
	Striped skunk Mephitis mephitis	LC		
Family Felidae
	Cougar; Puma concolor	LC	The Cougar is likely to be designated threatened or vulnerable by the MFFP. The population has undergone significant decline in eastern North America, but recently several signs may betray a return of the species.	
	Canada lynx Lynx canadensis	LC		
	Bobcat; Lynx rufus	LC		

== Artiodactyla ==
Photo	Names (English / Scientific)	IUCN Status	Notes	Range Map
Family Cervidae
	White-tailed deer Odocoileus virginianus	LC	Introduced to Anticosti Island in 1896.	
	Moose; Alces americanus	LC		
	Woodland caribou Rangifer tarandus caribou	NE	The status of the subspecies R. t. caribou is not evaluated by the IUCN, but the status of the species R. tarandus is of least concern. The Ministry of Forests, Wildlife and Parks considers the Woodland caribou, forest ecotype as vulnerable, but the Woodland caribou, mountain ecotype, Gaspésie population as threatened. COSEWIC considers the Gaspésie-Atlantic, Eastern migratory and Torngat Mountains populations as endangered and the boreal population as threatened.	
	Elk; Cervus canadensis	LC	The subspecies C. c. canadensis, now extinct, once occupied southern Quebec until the 1830s. The first specimen of this species described by Johann Christian Erxleben in 1777 came from Quebec.	
Family Bovidae
	Muskox; Ovibos moschatus	LC	Muskoxen were introduced in 1967 in the Kuujjuaq region. Initially captive, they were released to return to the wild from 1973.	

== Pinnipedia ==
Photo	Names (English / Scientific)	IUCN Status	Notes	Range Map
Family Phocidae
	Harbor seal Phoca vitulina	LC	COSEWIC considers the Lacs des Loups Marins subspecies (P. v. mellonae) as endangered. The MFFP considers the same subspecies as likely to be designated threatened or vulnerable.	
	Grey seal Halichoerus grypus	LC		
	Harp seal Pagophilus groenlandicus	LC		
	Hooded seal Cystophora cristata	VU		
	Ringed seal Pusa hispida	LC		
	Bearded seal Erignathus barbatus	LC		
Family Odobenidae
	Walrus; Odobenus rosmarus	VU	The MFFP considers this species as likely to be designated threatened or vulnerable. COSEWIC considers the status of the Central Arctic and Low Arctic population (O. r. rosmarus) as special concern. A population once occupied the coastal waters of the Maritimes and the Gulf of St. Lawrence until the 1800s but was hunted to extinction.	

== Cetacea ==
Photo	Names (English / Scientific)	IUCN Status	Notes	Range Map
Family Phocoenidae
	Harbour porpoise Phocoena phocoena	LC	This species is likely to be designated threatened or vulnerable by the MFFP and COSEWIC considers it as special concern.	
Family Delphinidae
	Atlantic white-sided dolphin Lagenorhynchus acutus	LC		
	White-beaked dolphin Lagenorhynchus albirostris	LC		
	Short-beaked common dolphin Delphinus delphis	LC		
	Long-finned pilot whale Globicephala melas	LC		
	Killer whale Orcinus orca	DD	COSEWIC considers the Northwest Atlantic and Eastern Arctic population as special concern.	
Family Monodontidae
	Beluga whale Delphinapterus leucas	LC	The Ministry of Forests, Wildlife and Parks considers the St. Lawrence Estuary population as threatened and the Eastern Hudson Bay and Ungava Bay populations as likely to be designated threatened or vulnerable. COSEWIC considers the St. Lawrence Estuary, Eastern Hudson Bay and Ungava Bay populations as threatened.	
	Narwhal; Monodon monoceros	NT	COSEWIC considers the status of this species as special concern.	
Family Ziphiidae
	Northern bottlenose whale Hyperoodon ampullatus	DD	COSEWIC considers the Scotian Shelf population as endangered and the Davis Strait, Baffin Bay and Labrador Sea population as special concern.	
Family Physeteridae
	Sperm whale Physeter macrocephalus	VU		
Family Balaenopteridae
	Common minke whale Balaenoptera acutorostrata	LC		
	Fin whale Balaenoptera physalus	VU	This species is likely to be designated threatened or vulnerable by the MFFP and COSEWIC considers the Atlantic population as special concern.	
	Sei whale Balaenoptera borealis	EN		
	Blue whale Balaenoptera musculus	EN	This species is likely to be designated threatened or vulnerable by the MFFP. COSEWIC considers the Atlantic population as endangered.	
	Humpback whale Megaptera novaeangliae	LC		
Family Balaenidae
	North Atlantic right whale Eubalaena glacialis	EN	The North Atlantic right whale is likely to be designated threatened or vulnerable by the MFFP. Population recovery is hindered by human-caused mortality.	
	Bowhead whale Balaena mysticetus	LC	COSEWIC considers the Eastern Canada and Western Greenland population as special concern.	

== See also ==
- List of mammals of Canada
- List of birds of Quebec
- List of reptiles of Quebec
- List of amphibians of Quebec
- List of trees of Quebec
