= List of reptiles of Quebec =

Reptiles in Quebec are classified into two orders: Testudines — the turtles — and Squamata — the snakes. There are eleven species of turtles classified in five families, including two exotic species. The snake species, numbering nine, are classified in four families, and include one species whose presence remains to be confirmed.

== Testudines ==
Photo	Names (common / scientific)	IUCN Status	Notes	Distribution map
Family Chelydridae
	Common snapping turtle Chelydra serpentina	LC	The AARQ reports observations in Abitibi-Témiscamingue, around Lac Saint-Jean, and in the Bas-Saint-Laurent. Common and widespread in Quebec. However, COSEWIC considers the status of this species of special concern.	
Family Kinosternidae
	Common musk turtle Sternotherus odoratus	LC	This species is designated as threatened in Quebec and is found only in the Outaouais, along the Ottawa River, between Portage-du-Fort and the locality of Quyon, as well as between Gatineau and Plaisance National Park. The first record of the species in the province dates from 1989. COSEWIC considers the status of this species of special concern.	
Family Emydidae
	Painted turtle Chrysemys picta	LC	Common and widespread in Quebec. However, COSEWIC considers the status of the subspecies C. p. picta of special concern. The painted turtle is the only reptile resistant to freezing.	
	Northern map turtle Graptemys geographica	LC	This species is designated as vulnerable in Quebec. COSEWIC considers the status of this species of special concern.	
	Blanding's turtle Emydoidea blandingii	EN	This species is designated as threatened in Quebec. COSEWIC considers this species endangered.	
	Wood turtle Glyptemys insculpta	EN	This species is designated as vulnerable in Quebec. COSEWIC considers this species threatened.	
	Spotted turtle Clemmys guttata	EN	This species is likely to be designated as threatened or vulnerable in Quebec. COSEWIC considers this species endangered.	
	Red-eared slider Trachemys scripta elegans	LC	Exotic species. It has not been proven to have established permanently in Quebec, although there are numerous observations in nature from individuals released from captivity.	
	Common box turtle Terrapene carolina	VU	Exotic species that is not established in Quebec. A few individuals, probably released from captivity, have been observed in the wild.	
Family Trionychidae
	Eastern spiny softshell Apalone spinifera	LC	This species is designated as threatened in Quebec. The only known population in the province is found in Lake Champlain and some of its tributaries. COSEWIC considers this species endangered.	
Family Dermochelyidae
	Leatherback sea turtle Dermochelys coriacea	VU	This species is designated as threatened in Quebec. COSEWIC considers the Atlantic population of this species endangered. Its presence in Quebec is limited to a few observations in the Gulf of Saint Lawrence.	

== Squamata ==
Photo	Names (common / scientific)	IUCN Status	Notes	Distribution map
Family Natricidae
	Common garter snake Thamnophis sirtalis	LC	The most common, widespread, and northernmost snake in Quebec.	
	Eastern ribbon snake Thamnophis sauritus	LC	This species is likely to be designated as threatened or vulnerable in Quebec. Rare, the few observations come from southern Outaouais. The first record in Quebec was reported in 2003.	
	Northern water snake Nerodia sipedon	LC	This species is likely to be designated as threatened or vulnerable in Quebec. The majority of observations come from the Outaouais.	
	Northern red-bellied snake Storeria occipitomaculata	LC	Common and widespread in Quebec.	
	De Kay's brown snake Storeria dekayi	LC	This species is likely to be designated as threatened or vulnerable in Quebec. Rare species. Observations come from the greater Montreal region.	
Family Colubridae
	Smooth green snake Opheodrys vernalis	LC	This species is likely to be designated as threatened or vulnerable in Quebec.	
	Eastern milksnake Lampropeltis triangulum	LC	This species is likely to be designated as threatened or vulnerable in Quebec. COSEWIC considers the status of this species of special concern.	
Family Dipsadidae
	Northern ringneck snake Diadophis punctatus	LC	This species is likely to be designated as threatened or vulnerable in Quebec.	
Family Viperidae
	Timber rattlesnake Crotalus horridus	LC	Borderline species. Unconfirmed observations of this species come from around lakes Champlain and Memphremagog as well as in Montérégie near the border. It is probable that this rattlesnake once occupied the province, but it is unlikely that it can be confirmed today given that it has been extirpated from several regions in the north of its range.	

== See also ==
- List of birds of Quebec
- List of amphibians of Quebec
- List of trees of Quebec
- List of mammals of Quebec
- List of reptiles of Canada
