= Pyrus sitchensis =

Pyrus sitchensis may refer to two different species of plants:

- Pyrus sitchensis (M.Roem.) Piper, a synonym for Sorbus sitchensis, Sitka mountain-ash
- Pyrus sitchensis B.L.Rob. & Fernald, a synonym for Sorbus decora, northern mountain ash
