= List of birds of Quebec =

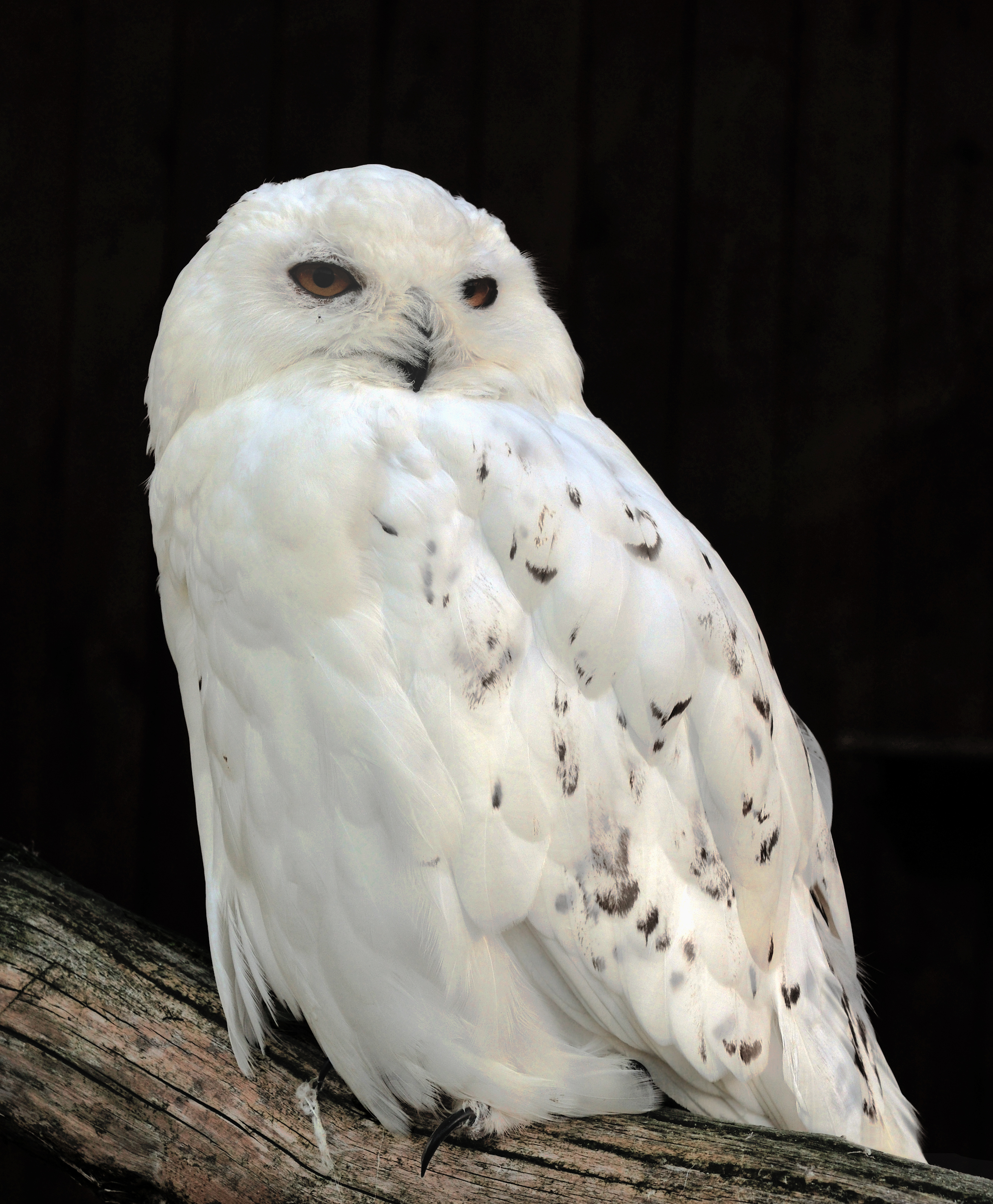
The snowy owl is the provincial bird of Quebec.

This is a list of bird species confirmed in the Canadian province of Quebec. Unless otherwise noted, the list is that of the Regroupement QuébecOiseaux (RQ) Checklist of the Birds of Quebec as of April 2021. The RQ Checklist contains 471 species. Of them, 152 are casual as defined below. Four species are extinct and seven species were introduced to North America. The list does not include species of unknown or captive origin.

This list is presented in the taxonomic sequence of the Check-list of North and Middle American Birds, 7th edition through the 62nd Supplement, published by the American Ornithological Society (AOS). Common and scientific names are also those of the Check-list, except that Canadian English spellings are used and the common names of families are from the Clements taxonomy because the AOS list does not include them. French names in parentheses are from the RQ Checklist.

The following tags are used to describe some categories of occurrence.

- (C) Casual - species which neither breed in Quebec nor are regular migrants
- (I) Introduced - introduced to North America by humans, but not necessarily directly introduced in Quebec

== Ducks, geese, and waterfowl ==
Order: Anseriformes Family: Anatidae

Anatidae includes the ducks and most duck-like waterfowl, such as geese and swans. These birds are adapted to an aquatic existence with webbed feet, bills which are flattened to a greater or lesser extent, and feathers that are excellent at shedding water due to special oils.

- Black-bellied whistling-duck (dendrocygne à ventre noir), Dendrocygna autumnalis (C)
- Fulvous whistling-duck (dendrocygne fauve), Dendrocygna bicolor (C)
- Snow goose (oie des neiges), Anser caerulescens
- Ross's goose (oie de Ross), Anser rossii
- Greater white-fronted goose (oie rieuse), Anser albifrons
- Taiga bean-goose (oie des moissons), Anser fabalis (C)
- Tundra bean-goose (oie de la toundra), Anser serrirostris (C)
- Pink-footed goose (oie à bec court), Anser brachyrhynchus (C)
- Greylag goose (oie cendrée), Anser anser (C)
- Brant (bernache cravant), Branta bernicla
- Barnacle goose (bernache nonnette), Branta leucopsis (C)
- Cackling goose (bernache de Hutchins), Branta hutchinsii
- Canada goose (bernache du Canada), Branta canadensis
- Mute swan (cygne tuberculé), Cygnus olor (I)
- Trumpeter swan (cygne tuberculé), Cygnus buccinator
- Tundra swan (cygne siffleur), Cygnus columbianus
- Common shelduck (tadorne de Belon), Tadorna tadorna (C)
- Wood duck (canard branchu), Aix sponsa
- Garganey (sarcelle d'été), Spatula querquedula (C)
- Blue-winged teal (sarcelle à ailes bleues), Spatula discors
- Cinnamon teal (sarcelle cannelle), Spatula cyanoptera (C)
- Northern shoveler (canard souchet), Spatula clypeata
- Gadwall (canard chipeau), Mareca strepera
- Eurasian wigeon (canard siffleur), Mareca penelope
- American wigeon (canard d'Amérique), Mareca americana
- Mallard (canard colvert), Anas platyrhynchos
- American black duck (canard noir), Anas rubripes
- Northern pintail (canard pilet), Anas acuta
- Green-winged teal (sarcelle d'hiver), Anas crecca
- Canvasback (fuligule à dos blanc), Aythya valisineria
- Redhead (fuligule à tête rouge), Aythya americana
- Ring-necked duck (fuligule à collier), Aythya collaris
- Tufted duck (fuligule morillon), Aythya fuligula (C)
- Greater scaup (fuligule milouinan), Aythya marila
- Lesser scaup (petit Fuligule), Aythya affinis
- Steller's eider (eider de Steller), Polysticta stelleri (C)
- King eider (eider à tête grise), Somateria spectabilis
- Common eider (eider à duvet), Somateria mollissima
- Harlequin duck (arlequin plongeur), Histrionicus histrionicus
- Labrador duck (eider du Labrador), Camptorhynchus labradorius (Extinct)
- Surf scoter (macreuse à front blanc), Melanitta perspicillata
- White-winged scoter (macreuse à ailes blanches), Melanitta deglandi
- Black scoter (macreuse à bec jaune), Melanitta americana
- Long-tailed duck (harelde kakawi), Clangula hyemalis
- Bufflehead (petit Garrot), Bucephala albeola
- Common goldeneye (garrot à oeil d'or), Bucephala clangula
- Barrow's goldeneye (garrot d'Islande), Bucephala islandica
- Hooded merganser (harle couronné), Lophodytes cucullatus
- Common merganser (grand Harle), Mergus merganser
- Red-breasted merganser (harle huppé), Mergus serrator
- Ruddy duck (érismature rousse), Oxyura jamaicensis

== Pheasants, grouse, and allies ==
Order: Galliformes Family: Phasianidae

Phasianidae consists of the pheasants and their allies. These are terrestrial species, variable in size but generally plump with broad relatively short wings. Many species are gamebirds or have been domesticated as a food source for humans.

- Wild turkey (dindon sauvage), Meleagris gallopavo
- Ruffed grouse (gélinotte huppée), Bonasa umbellus
- Spruce grouse (tétras du Canada), Canachites canadensis
- Willow ptarmigan (lagopède des saules), Lagopus lagopus
- Rock ptarmigan (lagopède alpin), Lagopus mutus
- Sharp-tailed grouse (tétras à queue fine), Tympanuchus phasianellus
- Grey partridge (perdrix grise), Perdix perdix (I)

== Grebes ==
Order: Podicipediformes Family: Podicipedidae

Grebes are small to medium-large freshwater diving birds. They have lobed toes and are excellent swimmers and divers. However, they have their feet placed far back on the body, making them quite ungainly on land.

- Pied-billed grebe (grèbe à bec bigarré), Podilymbus podiceps
- Horned grebe (grèbe esclavon), Podiceps auritus
- Red-necked grebe (grèbe jougris), Podiceps grisegena
- Eared grebe (grèbe à cou noir), Podiceps nigricollis (C)
- Western grebe (grèbe élégant), Aechmorphorus occidentalis (C)

== Pigeons and doves ==
Order: Columbiformes Family: Columbidae

Pigeons and doves are stout-bodied birds with short necks and short slender bills with a fleshy cere. They feed on seeds, fruit and plants. Unlike most other birds, the doves and pigeons produce "crop milk," which is secreted by a sloughing of fluid-filled cells from the lining of the crop. Both sexes produce this highly nutritious substance to feed to the young.

- Rock pigeon (pigeon biset), Columba livia (I)
- Common wood pigeon (pigeon ramier), Columba palumbus (C)
- Band-tailed pigeon (pigeon à queue barrée), Patagioenas fasciata (C)
- Eurasian collared-dove (tourterelle turque), Streptopelia decaocto (I)
- Passenger pigeon (tourte voyageuse), Ectopistes migratorius (Extinct)
- Common ground dove (colombe à queue noire), Columbina passerina (C)
- White-winged dove (tourterelle à ailes blanches), Zenaida asiatica (C)
- Mourning dove (tourterelle triste), Zenaida macroura

== Cuckoos ==
Order: Cuculiformes Family: Cuculidae

The family Cuculidae includes cuckoos, roadrunners, and anis. These birds are of variable size with slender bodies, long tails, and strong legs.

- Common cuckoo (coucou gris), Cuculus canorus (C)
- Yellow-billed cuckoo (coulicou à bec jaune), Coccyzus americanus
- Black-billed cuckoo (coulicou à bec noir), Coccyzus erythropthalmus

== Nightjars and allies ==
Order: Caprimulgiformes Family: Caprimulgidae

Nightjars are medium-sized nocturnal birds that usually nest on the ground. They have long wings, short legs, and very short bills. Most have small feet, of little use for walking, and long pointed wings. Their soft plumage is cryptically coloured to resemble bark or leaves.

- Common nighthawk (engoulevent d'Amérique), Chordeiles minor
- Chuck-will's-widow (engoulevent de Caroline), Antrostomus carolinensis (C)
- Eastern whip-poor-will (engoulevent bois-pourri), Antrostomus vociferus

== Swifts ==
Order: Apodiformes Family: Apodidae

The swifts are small birds which spend the majority of their lives flying. These birds have very short legs and never settle voluntarily on the ground, perching instead only on vertical surfaces. Many swifts have long swept-back wings which resemble a crescent or boomerang.

- Chimney swift (martinet ramoneur), Chaetura pelagica
- Common swift (martinet noir), Apus apus (C)

== Hummingbirds ==
Order: Apodiformes Family: Trochilidae

Hummingbirds are small birds capable of hovering in mid-air due to the rapid flapping of their wings. They are the only birds that can fly backwards.

- Mexican violetear (colibri thalassin), Colibri thalassinus (C)
- Amethyst-throated mountain-gem (colibri à gorge améthyste), Lampornis amethystinus (C)
- Ruby-throated hummingbird (colibri à gorge rubis), Archilochus colubris
- Anna's hummingbird (colibri d'Anna), Calypte anna (C)
- Rufous hummingbird (colibri roux), Selasphorus rufus (C)
- Broad-billed hummingbird (colibri circé), Cynanthus latirostris (C)

== Rails, gallinules, and coots ==
Order: Gruiformes Family: Rallidae

Rallidae is a large family of small to medium-sized birds which includes the rails, crakes, coots, and gallinules. The most typical family members occupy dense vegetation in damp environments near lakes, swamps, or rivers. In general they are shy and secretive birds, making them difficult to observe. Most species have strong legs and long toes which are well adapted to soft uneven surfaces. They tend to have short, rounded wings and to be weak fliers.

- Clapper rail (râle tapageur), Rallus crepitans (C)
- King rail (râle élégant), Rallus elegans (C)
- Virginia rail (râle de Virginie), Rallus limicola
- Sora (marouette de Caroline), Porzana carolina
- Common gallinule (gallinule d'Amérique), Gallinula galeata
- Eurasian coot (foulque macroule), Fulica atra (C)
- American coot (foulque d'Amérique), Fulica americana
- Purple gallinule (talève violacée), Porphyrio martinicus (C)
- Yellow rail (râle jaune), Coturnicops noveboracensis

== Cranes ==
Order: Gruiformes Family: Gruidae

Cranes are large, long-legged and long-necked birds. Unlike the similar-looking but unrelated herons, cranes fly with necks outstretched, not pulled back. Most have elaborate and noisy courting displays or "dances".

- Sandhill crane (grue du Canada), Antigone canadensis
- Common crane (grue cendrée), Grus grus (C)
- Whooping crane (grue blanche), Grus americana (C)

== Stilts and avocets ==
Order: Charadriiformes Family: Recurvirostridae

Recurvirostridae is a family of large wading birds which includes the avocets and stilts. The avocets have long legs and long up-curved bills. The stilts have extremely long legs and long, thin, straight bills.

- Black-necked stilt (échasse d'Amérique), Himantopus mexicanus (C)
- American avocet (avocette d'Amérique), Recurvirostra americana (C)

== Oystercatchers ==
Order: Charadriiformes Family: Haematopodidae

The oystercatchers are large, obvious, and noisy plover-like birds, with strong bills used for smashing or prying open molluscs.

- American oystercatcher (huîtrier d'Amérique), Haematopus palliatus (C)

== Plovers and lapwings ==
Order: Charadriiformes Family: Charadriidae

The family Charadriidae includes the plovers, dotterels, and lapwings. They are small to medium-sized birds with compact bodies, short thick necks, and long, usually pointed, wings. They are found in open country worldwide, mostly in habitats near water.

- Northern lapwing (vanneau huppé), Vanellus vanellus (C)
- Black-bellied plover (pluvier argenté), Pluvialis squatarola
- European golden-plover (pluvier doré), Pluvialis apricaria (C)
- American golden-plover (pluvier bronzé), Pluvialis dominica
- Killdeer (pluvier kildir), Charadrius vociferus
- Common ringed plover (pluvier grand-gravelot), Charadrius hiaticula (C)
- Semipalmated plover (pluvier semipalmé), Charadrius semipalmatus
- Piping plover (pluvier siffleur), Charadrius melodus
- Wilson's plover (pluvier de Wilson), Charadrius wilsonia (C)

== Sandpipers and allies ==
Order: Charadriiformes Family: Scolopacidae

Scolopacidae is a large diverse family of small to medium-sized shorebirds including the sandpipers, curlews, godwits, shanks, tattlers, woodcocks, snipes, dowitchers, and phalaropes. The majority of these species eat small invertebrates picked out of the mud or soil. Different lengths of legs and bills enable multiple species to feed in the same habitat, particularly on the coast, without direct competition for food.

- Upland sandpiper (maubèche des champs), Bartramia longicauda
- Whimbrel (courlis corlieu), Numenius phaeopus
- Eskimo curlew (courlis esquimau), Numenius borealis (Extinct)
- Bar-tailed godwit (barge rousse), Limosa lapponica (C)
- Black-tailed godwit (barge à queue noire), Limosa limosa (C)
- Hudsonian godwit (barge hudsonienne), Limosa haemastica
- Marbled godwit (barge marbrée), Limosa fedoa
- Ruddy turnstone (tournepierre à collier), Arenaria interpres
- Red knot (bécasseau maubèche), Calidris canutus
- Ruff (combattant varié), Calidris pugnax (C)
- Sharp-tailed sandpiper (bécasseau à queue pointue), Calidris acuminata (C)
- Stilt sandpiper (bécasseau à échasses), Calidris himantopus
- Curlew sandpiper (bécasseau cocorli), Calidris ferruginea (C)
- Red-necked stint (bécasseau à col roux), Calidris ruficollis (C)
- Sanderling (bécasseau sanderling), Calidris alba
- Dunlin (bécasseau variable), Calidris alpina
- Purple sandpiper (bécasseau violet), Calidris maritima
- Baird's sandpiper (bécasseau de Baird), Calidris bairdii
- Least sandpiper (bécasseau minuscule), Calidris minutilla
- White-rumped sandpiper (bécasseau à croupion blanc), Calidris fuscicollis
- Buff-breasted sandpiper (bécasseau roussâtre), Calidris subruficollis
- Pectoral sandpiper (bécasseau à poitrine cendrée), Calidris melanotos
- Semipalmated sandpiper (bécasseau semipalmé), Calidris pusilla
- Western sandpiper (bécasseau d'Alaska), Calidris mauri
- Short-billed dowitcher (bécassin roux), Limnodromus griseus
- Long-billed dowitcher (bécassin à long bec), Limnodromus scolopaceus
- American woodcock (bécasse d'Amérique), Scolopax minor
- Wilson's snipe (bécassine de Wilson), Gallinago delicata
- Spotted sandpiper (chevalier grivelé), Actitis macularia
- Solitary sandpiper (chevalier solitaire), Tringa solitaria
- Lesser yellowlegs (petit Chevalier), Tringa flavipes
- Willet (chevalier semipalmé), Tringa semipalmata
- Common greenshank (chevalier aboyeur), Tringa nebularia (C)
- Greater yellowlegs (grand Chevalier), Tringa melanoleuca
- Wilson's phalarope (phalarope de Wilson), Phalaropus tricolor
- Red-necked phalarope (phalarope à bec étroit), Phalaropus lobatus
- Red phalarope (phalarope à bec large), Phalaropus fulicarius

== Skuas and jaegers ==
Order: Charadriiformes Family: Stercorariidae

Skuas and jaegers are in general medium to large birds, typically with grey or brown plumage, often with white markings on the wings. They have longish bills with hooked tips and webbed feet with sharp claws. They look like large dark gulls, but have a fleshy cere above the upper mandible. They are strong, acrobatic fliers.

- Pomarine jaeger (labbe pomarin), Stercorarius pomarinus
- Parasitic jaeger (labbe parasite), Stercorarius parasiticus
- Long-tailed jaeger (labbe à longue queue), Stercorarius longicaudus

== Auks, murres, and puffins ==
Order: Charadriiformes Family: Alcidae

Alcids are superficially similar to penguins due to their black-and-white colours, their upright posture, and some of their habits, however they are only distantly related to the penguins and are able to fly. Auks live on the open sea, only deliberately coming ashore to nest.

- Dovekie (mergule nain), Alle alle
- Common murre (guillemot marmette), Uria aalge
- Thick-billed murre (guillemot de Brünnich), Uria lomvia
- Razorbill (petit Pingouin), Alca torda
- Great auk (grand Pingouin), Pinguinus impennis (Extinct)
- Black guillemot (guillemot à miroir), Cepphus grylle
- Long-billed murrelet (guillemot à long bec), Brachyramphus perdix (C)
- Ancient murrelet (guillemot à cou blanc), Synthliboramphus antiquus (C)
- Atlantic puffin (macareux moine), Fratercula arctica

== Gulls, terns, and skimmers ==
Order: Charadriiformes Family: Laridae

Laridae is a family of medium to large seabirds and includes gulls, terns, kittiwakes, and skimmers. They are typically grey or white, often with black markings on the head or wings. They have stout, longish bills and webbed feet.

- Black-legged kittiwake (mouette tridactyle), Rissa tridactyla
- Ivory gull (mouette blanche), Pagophila eburnea (C)
- Sabine's gull (mouette de Sabine), Xema sabini
- Bonaparte's gull (mouette de Bonaparte), Chroicocephalus philadelphia
- Black-headed gull (mouette rieuse), Chroicocephalus ridibundus
- Little gull (mouette pygmée), Hydrocoleus minutus
- Ross's gull (mouette rosée), Rhodostethia rosea (C)
- Laughing gull (mouette atricille), Leucophaeus atricilla (C)
- Franklin's gull (mouette de Franklin), Leucophaeus pipixcan (C)
- Black-tailed gull (goéland à queue noire), Larus crassirostris (C)
- Common gull (goéland cendré), Larus canus (C)
- Short-billed gullLarus brachyrhynchus (C)
- Ring-billed gull (goéland à bec cerclé), Larus delawarensis
- California gull (goéland de Californie), Larus californicus (C)
- Herring gull (goéland argenté), Larus argentatus
- Yellow-legged gull (goéland leucophée), Larus cachinnans (C)
- Iceland gull (goéland arctique), Larus glaucoides
- Lesser black-backed gull (goéland brun), Larus fuscus
- Slaty-backed gull (goéland à manteau ardoisé), Larus schistisagus (C)
- Glaucous gull (goéland bourgmestre), Larus hyperboreus
- Great black-backed gull (goéland marin), Larus marinus
- Sooty tern (sterne fuligineuse), Onychoprion fuscatus (C)
- Gull-billed tern (sterne hansel), Gelochelidon nilotica (C)
- Caspian tern (sterne caspienne), Hydroprogne caspia
- Black tern (guifette noire), Chlidonias niger
- White-winged tern (guifette leucoptère), Chlidonias leucopterus (C)
- Roseate tern (sterne de Dougall), Sterna dougallii (C)
- Common tern (sterne pierregarin), Sterna hirundo
- Arctic tern (sterne arctique), Sterna paradisaea
- Forster's tern (sterne de Forster), Sterna forsteri (C)
- Royal tern (sterne royale), Thalasseus maximus (C)
- Sandwich tern (sterne caugek), Thalasseus sandvicensis (C)
- Black skimmer (bec-en-ciseaux noir), Rynchops niger (C)

== Loons ==
Order: Gaviiformes Family: Gaviidae

Loons are aquatic birds the size of a large duck, to which they are unrelated. Their plumage is largely grey or black, and they have spear-shaped bills. Loons swim well and fly adequately, but are almost hopeless on land, because their legs are placed towards the rear of the body.

- Red-throated loon (plongeon catmarin), Gavia stellata
- Pacific loon (plongeon du Pacifique), Gavia pacifica
- Common loon (plongeon huard), Gavia immer

== Albatrosses ==
Order: Procellariiformes Family: Diomedeidae

The albatrosses are amongst the largest of flying birds, and the great albatrosses from the genus Diomedea have the largest wingspans of any extant birds.

- Yellow-nosed albatross (albatros à nez jaune), Thalassarche chlororhynchos (C)

== Southern storm-petrels ==
Order: Procellariiformes Family: Oceanitidae

The storm-petrels are the smallest seabirds, relatives of the petrels, feeding on planktonic crustaceans and small fish picked from the surface, typically while hovering. The flight is fluttering and sometimes bat-like. Until 2018, this family's three species were included with the other storm-petrels in family Hydrobatidae.

- Wilson's storm-petrel (océanite de Wilson), Oceanites oceanicus

== Northern storm-petrels ==
Order: Procellariiformes Family: Hydrobatidae

Though the members of this family are similar in many respects to the southern storm-petrels, including their general appearance and habits, there are enough genetic differences to warrant their placement in a separate family.

- Leach's storm-petrel (océanite cul-blanc), Hydrobates leucorhous

== Shearwaters and petrels ==
Order: Procellariiformes Family: Procellariidae

The procellariids are the main group of medium-sized "true petrels", characterized by united nostrils with medium septum and a long outer functional primary.

- Northern fulmar (fulmar boréal), Fulmarus glacialis
- Cory's shearwater (puffin cendré), Calonectris diomedea (C)
- Sooty shearwater (puffin fuligineux), Ardenna griseus
- Great shearwater (puffin majeur), Ardenna gravis
- Manx shearwater (puffin des Anglais), Puffinus puffinus

== Storks ==
Order: Ciconiiformes Family: Ciconiidae

Storks are large, heavy, long-legged, long-necked wading birds with long stout bills and wide wingspans. They lack the powder down that other wading birds such as herons, spoonbills and ibises use to clean off fish slime. Storks lack a pharynx and are mute.

- Wood stork (tantale d'Amérique), Mycteria americana (C)

== Frigatebirds ==
Order: Suliformes Family: Fregatidae

Frigatebirds are large seabirds usually found over tropical oceans. They are large, black, or black-and-white, with long wings and deeply forked tails. The males have coloured inflatable throat pouches. They do not swim or walk and cannot take off from a flat surface. Having the largest wingspan-to-body-weight ratio of any bird, they are essentially aerial, able to stay aloft for more than a week.

- Magnificent frigatebird (frégate superbe), Fregata magnificens (C)

== Boobies and gannets ==
Order: Suliformes Family: Sulidae

The sulids comprise the gannets and boobies. Both groups are medium-large coastal seabirds that plunge-dive for fish.

- Brown booby (fou brun), Sula leucogaster (C)
- Northern gannet (fou de Bassan), Morus bassanus

== Cormorants and shags ==
Order: Suliformes Family: Phalacrocoracidae

Cormorants are medium-to-large aquatic birds, usually with mainly dark plumage and areas of coloured skin on the face. The bill is long, thin, and sharply hooked. Their feet are four-toed and webbed.

- Great cormorant (grand Cormoran), Phalacrocorax carbo
- Double-crested cormorant (cormoran à aigrettes), Nannopterum auritum
- Neotropic cormorant (cormoran vigua), Nannopterum brasilianum (C)

== Pelicans ==
Order: Pelecaniformes Family: Pelecanidae

Pelicans are very large water birds with a distinctive pouch under their beak. Like other birds in the order Pelecaniformes, they have four webbed toes.

- American white pelican (pélican d'Amérique), Pelecanus erythrorhynchos (C)
- Brown pelican (pélican brun), Pelecanus occidentalis (C)

== Herons, egrets, and bitterns ==
Order: Pelecaniformes Family: Ardeidae

The family Ardeidae contains the herons, egrets, and bitterns. Herons and egrets are medium to large wading birds with long necks and legs. Bitterns tend to be shorter necked and more secretive. Members of Ardeidae fly with their necks retracted, unlike other long-necked birds such as storks, ibises, and spoonbills.

- American bittern (butor d'Amérique), Botaurus lentiginosus
- Least bittern (petit Blongios), Ixobrychus exilis
- Great blue heron (grand Héron), Ardea herodias
- Great egret (grande Aigrette), Ardea alba
- Little egret (aigrette garzette), Egretta garzetta (C)
- Snowy egret (aigrette neigeuse), Egretta thula (C)
- Little blue heron (aigrette bleue), Egretta caerulea (C)
- Tricolored heron (aigrette tricolore), Egretta tricolor (C)
- Cattle egret (héron garde-boeufs), Bubulcus ibis (C)
- Green heron (héron vert), Butorides virescens
- Black-crowned night-heron (bihoreau gris), Nycticorax nycticorax
- Yellow-crowned night-heron (bihoreau violacé), Nyctanassa violacea (C)

== Ibises and spoonbills ==
Order: Pelecaniformes Family: Threskiornithidae

The family Threskiornithidae includes the ibises and spoonbills. They have long, broad wings. Their bodies tend to be elongated, the neck more so, with rather long legs. The bill is also long, decurved in the case of the ibises, straight and distinctively flattened in the spoonbills.

- White ibis (ibis blanc), Eudocimus albus (C)
- Glossy ibis (ibis falcinelle), Plegadis falcinellus (C)
- White-faced ibis (ibis à face blanche), Plegadis chihi (C)
- Roseate spoonbill (spatule rosée), Ajaia ajaja (C)

== New World vultures ==
Order: Cathartiformes Family: Cathartidae

The New World vultures are not closely related to Old World vultures, but superficially resemble them because of convergent evolution. Like the Old World vultures, they are scavengers. However, unlike Old World vultures, which find carcasses by sight, New World vultures have a good sense of smell with which they locate carcasses.

- Black vulture (urubu noir), Coragyps atratus (C)
- Turkey vulture (urubu à tête rouge), Cathartes aura

== Osprey ==
Order: Accipitriformes Family: Pandionidae

Pandionidae is a family of fish-eating birds of prey possessing a very large, powerful hooked beak for tearing flesh from their prey, strong legs, powerful talons, and keen eyesight. The family is monotypic.

- Osprey (balbuzard pêcheur), Pandion haliaetus

== Hawks, eagles, and kites ==
Order: Accipitriformes Family: Accipitridae

Accipitridae is a family of birds of prey which includes hawks, eagles, kites, harriers, and Old World vultures. These birds have very large powerful hooked beaks for tearing flesh from their prey, strong legs, powerful talons, and keen eyesight.

- Swallow-tailed kite (naucler à queue fourchue), Elanoides forficatus (C)
- Golden eagle (aigle royal), Aquila chrysaetos
- Northern harrier (busard des marais), Circus hudsonius
- Sharp-shinned hawk (épervier brun), Accipiter striatus
- Cooper's hawk (épervier de Cooper), Accipiter cooperii
- American goshawk (autour des palombes), Accipiter atricapillus
- Bald eagle (pygargue à tête blanche), Haliaeetus leucocephalus
- Steller's sea-eagle, Haliaeetus pelagicus (C)
- Mississippi kite (milan du Mississippi), Ictinia mississippiensis (C)
- Red-shouldered hawk (buse à épaulettes), Buteo lineatus
- Broad-winged hawk (petite Buse), Buteo platypterus
- Swainson's hawk (buse de Swainson), Buteo swainsoni (C)
- Red-tailed hawk (buse à queue rousse), Buteo jamaicensis
- Rough-legged hawk (buse pattue), Buteo lagopus

== Barn owls ==
Order: Strigiformes Family: Tytonidae

Owls in the family Tytonidae are medium to large owls with large heads and characteristic heart-shaped faces.

- American barn owl (effraie des clochers), Tyto furcata

== Owls ==
Order: Strigiformes Family: Strigidae

Typical owls are small to large solitary nocturnal birds of prey. They have large forward-facing eyes and ears, a hawk-like beak, and a conspicuous circle of feathers around each eye called a facial disk.

- Eastern screech-owl (petit-duc maculé), Megascops asio
- Great horned owl (grand-duc d'Amérique), Bubo virginianus
- Snowy owl (harfang des neiges), Bubo scandiacus
- Northern hawk owl (chouette épervière), Surnia ulula
- Burrowing owl (chevêche des terriers), Athene cunicularia (C)
- Barred owl (chouette rayée), Strix varia
- Great grey owl (chouette lapone), Strix nebulosa
- Long-eared owl (hibou moyen-duc), Asio otus
- Short-eared owl (hibou des marais), Asio flammeus
- Boreal owl (nyctale de Tengmalm), Aegolius funereus
- Northern saw-whet owl (petite Nyctale), Aegolius acadicus

== Kingfishers ==
Order: Coraciiformes Family: Alcedinidae

Kingfishers are medium-sized birds with large heads, long, pointed bills, short legs, and stubby tails.

- Belted kingfisher (martin-pêcheur d'Amérique), Megaceryle alcyon

== Woodpeckers ==
Order: Piciformes Family: Picidae

Woodpeckers are small to medium-sized birds with chisel-like beaks, short legs, stiff tails, and long tongues used for capturing insects. Some species have feet with two toes pointing forward and two backward, while several species have only three toes. Many woodpeckers have the habit of tapping noisily on tree trunks with their beaks.

- Red-headed woodpecker (pic à tête rouge), Melanerpes erythrocephalus
- Red-bellied woodpecker (pic à ventre roux), Melanerpes carolinus
- Yellow-bellied sapsucker (pic maculé), Sphyrapicus varius
- American three-toed woodpecker (pic à dos rayé), Picoides dorsalis
- Black-backed woodpecker (pic à dos noir), Picoides arcticus
- Downy woodpecker (pic mineur), Dryobates pubescens
- Hairy woodpecker (pic chevelu), Dryobates villosus
- Northern flicker (pic flamboyant), Colaptes auratus
- Pileated woodpecker (grand Pic), Dryocopus pileatus

== Falcons and caracaras ==
Order: Falconiformes Family: Falconidae

Falconidae is a family of diurnal birds of prey, notably the falcons and caracaras. They differ from hawks, eagles, and kites in that they kill with their beaks instead of their talons.

- Crested caracara (caracara du Nord), Caracara plancus (C)
- American kestrel (crécerelle d'Amérique), Falco sparverius
- Merlin (faucon émerillon), Falco columbarius
- Gyrfalcon (faucon gerfaut), Falco rusticolus
- Peregrine falcon (faucon pèlerin), Falco peregrinus

== Tyrant flycatchers ==
Order: Passeriformes Family: Tyrannidae

Tyrant flycatchers are Passerine birds which occur throughout North and South America. They superficially resemble the Old World flycatchers, but are more robust and have stronger bills. They do not have the sophisticated vocal capabilities of the songbirds. Most, but not all, are rather plain. As the name implies, most are insectivorous.

- Small-billed elaenia, Elaenia parvirostris (C)
- Ash-throated flycatcher (tyran à gorge cendrée), Myiarchus cinerascens (C)
- Great crested flycatcher (tyran huppé), Myiarchus crinitus
- Tropical kingbird (tyran mélancolique), Tyrannus melancholicus (C)
- Western kingbird (tyran de l'Ouest), Tyrannus verticalis (C)
- Eastern kingbird (tyran tritri), Tyrannus tyrannus
- Grey kingbird (tyran gris), Tyrannus dominicensis (C)
- Scissor-tailed flycatcher (tyran à longue queue), Tyrannus forficatus (C)
- Fork-tailed flycatcher (tyran des savanes), Tyrannus savana (C)
- Olive-sided flycatcher (moucherolle à côtés olive), Contopus cooperi
- Western wood-pewee (pioui de l'Ouest), Contopus sordidulus (C)
- Eastern wood-pewee (pioui de l'Est), Contopus virens
- Yellow-bellied flycatcher (moucherolle à ventre jaune), Empidonax flaviventris
- Acadian flycatcher (moucherolle vert), Empidonax virescens (C)
- Alder flycatcher (moucherolle des aulnes), Empidonax alnorum
- Willow flycatcher (moucherolle des saules), Empidonax traillii
- Least flycatcher (moucherolle tchébec), Empidonax minimus
- Eastern phoebe (moucherolle phébi), Sayornis phoebe
- Say's phoebe (moucherolle à ventre roux), Sayornis saya (C)
- Vermilion flycatcher (moucherolle vermillon), Pyrocephalus rubinus (C)

== Vireos, shrike-babblers, and erpornis ==
Order: Passeriformes Family: Vireonidae

The vireos are a group of small to medium-sized passerine birds mostly restricted to the New World, though a few other members of the family are found in Asia. They are typically greenish in colour and resemble wood warblers apart from their heavier bills.

- Black-capped vireo (viréo à tête noire), Vireo atricapilla (C)
- White-eyed vireo (viréo aux yeux blancs), Vireo griseus (C)
- Yellow-throated vireo (viréo à gorge jaune), Vireo flavifrons
- Blue-headed vireo (viréo à tête bleue), Vireo solitarius
- Philadelphia vireo (viréo de Philadelphie), Vireo philadelphicus
- Warbling vireo (viréo mélodieux), Vireo gilvus
- Red-eyed vireo (viréo aux yeux rouges), Vireo olivaceus
- Yellow-green vireo (viréo jaune-verdâtre), Vireo flavoviridis (C)

== Shrikes ==
Order: Passeriformes Family: Laniidae

Shrikes are passerine birds known for their habit of catching other birds and small animals and impaling the uneaten portions of their bodies on thorns. A shrike's beak is hooked, like that of a typical bird of prey.

- Loggerhead shrike (pie-grièche migratrice), Lanius ludovicianus
- Northern shrike (pie-grièche boréale), Lanius borealis

== Crows, jays, and magpies ==
Order: Passeriformes Family: Corvidae

The family Corvidae includes crows, ravens, jays, choughs, magpies, treepies, nutcrackers, and ground jays. Corvids are above average in size among the Passeriformes, and some of the larger species show high levels of intelligence.

- Canada jay (mésangeai du Canada), Perisoreus canadensis
- Blue jay (geai bleu), Cyanocitta cristata
- Black-billed magpie (pie d'Amérique), Pica hudsonia (C)
- Eurasian jackdaw (choucas des tours), Corvus monedula (C)
- American crow (corneille d'Amérique), Corvus brachyrhynchos
- Fish crow (corneille de rivage), Corvus ossifragus (C)
- Common raven (grand Corbeau), Corvus corax

== Tits, chickadees, and titmice ==
Order: Passeriformes Family: Paridae

The Paridae are mainly small stocky woodland species with short stout bills. Some have crests. They are adaptable birds, with a mixed diet including seeds and insects.

- Black-capped chickadee (mésange à tête noire), Poecile atricapilla
- Boreal chickadee (mésange à tête brune), Poecile hudsonica
- Tufted titmouse (mésange bicolore), Baeolophus bicolor

== Larks ==
Order: Passeriformes Family: Alaudidae

Larks are small terrestrial birds with often extravagant songs and display flights. Most larks are fairly dull in appearance. Their food is insects and seeds.

- Eurasian skylark (alouette des champs), Alauda arvensis (C)
- Horned lark (alouette hausse-col), Eremophila alpestris

== Swallows ==
Order: Passeriformes Family: Hirundinidae

The family Hirundinidae is adapted to aerial feeding. They have a slender streamlined body, long pointed wings, and a short bill with a wide gape. The feet are adapted to perching rather than walking, and the front toes are partially joined at the base.

- Bank swallow (hirondelle de rivage), Riparia riparia
- Tree swallow (hirondelle bicolore), Tachycineta bicolor
- Violet-green swallow (hirondelle à face blanche), Tachycineta thalassina (C)
- Northern rough-winged swallow (hirondelle à ailes hérissées), Stelgidopteryx serripennis
- Purple martin (hirondelle noire), Progne subis
- Barn swallow (hirondelle rustique), Hirundo rustica
- Cliff swallow (hirondelle à front blanc), Petrochelidon pyrrhonota
- Cave swallow (hirondelle à front brun), Petrochelidon fulva (C)

== Kinglets ==
Order: Passeriformes Family: Regulidae

The kinglets are a small family of birds which resemble the titmice. They are very small insectivorous birds. The adults have coloured crowns, giving rise to their name.

- Ruby-crowned kinglet (roitelet à couronne rubis), Corthylio calendula
- Golden-crowned kinglet (roitelet à couronne dorée), Regulus satrapa

== Waxwings ==
Order: Passeriformes Family: Bombycillidae

The waxwings are a group of passerine birds with soft silky plumage and unique red tips to some of the wing feathers. In the Bohemian and cedar waxwings, these tips look like sealing wax and give the group its name. These are arboreal birds of northern forests. They live on insects in summer and berries in winter.

- Bohemian waxwing (jaseur boréal), Bombycilla garrulus
- Cedar waxwing (jaseur d'Amérique), Bombycilla cedrorum

== Nuthatches ==
Order: Passeriformes Family: Sittidae

Nuthatches are small woodland birds. They have the unusual ability to climb down trees head first, unlike other birds which can only go upwards. Nuthatches have big heads, short tails and powerful bills and feet.

- Red-breasted nuthatch (sittelle à poitrine rousse), Sitta canadensis
- White-breasted nuthatch (sittelle à poitrine blanche), Sitta carolinensis

== Treecreepers ==
Order: Passeriformes Family: Certhiidae

Treecreepers are small woodland birds, brown above and white below. They have thin pointed down-curved bills, which they use to extricate insects from bark. They have stiff tail feathers, like woodpeckers, which they use to support themselves on vertical trees.

- Brown creeper (grimpereau brun), Certhia americana

== Gnatcatchers ==
Order: Passeriformes Family: Polioptilidae

These dainty birds resemble Old World warblers in their structure and habits, moving restlessly through the foliage seeking insects. The gnatcatchers are mainly soft bluish grey in colour and have the typical insectivore's long sharp bill. Many species have distinctive black head patterns (especially males) and long, regularly cocked, black-and-white tails.

- Blue-grey gnatcatcher (gobemoucheron gris-bleu), Polioptila caerulea

== Wrens ==
Order: Passeriformes Family: Troglodytidae

Wrens are small and inconspicuous birds, except for their loud songs. They have short wings and thin down-turned bills. Several species often hold their tails upright. All are insectivorous.

- Rock wren (troglodyte des rochers), Salpinctes obsoletus (C)
- House wren (troglodyte familier), Troglodytes aedon
- Winter wren (troglodyte des forêts), Troglodytes hiemalis
- Sedge wren (troglodyte à bec court), Cistothorus platensis
- Marsh wren (troglodyte des marais), Cistothorus palustris
- Carolina wren (troglodyte de Caroline), Thryothorus ludovicianus

== Mockingbirds and thrashers ==
Order: Passeriformes Family: Mimidae

The mimids are a family of passerine birds which includes thrashers, mockingbirds, tremblers, and the New World catbirds. These birds are notable for their vocalization, especially their remarkable ability to mimic a wide variety of birds and other sounds heard outdoors. The species tend towards dull greys and browns in their appearance.

- Grey catbird (moqueur chat), Dumetella carolinensis
- Brown thrasher (moqueur roux), Toxostoma rufum
- Northern mockingbird (moqueur polyglotte), Mimus polyglottos

== Starlings ==
Order: Passeriformes Family: Sturnidae

Starlings and mynas are small to medium-sized Old World passerine birds with strong feet. Their flight is strong and direct and most are very gregarious. Their preferred habitat is fairly open country, and they eat insects and fruit. The plumage of several species is dark with a metallic sheen.

- European starling (étourneau sansonnet), Sturnus vulgaris (I)

== Thrushes and allies ==
Order: Passeriformes Family: Turdidae

The thrushes are a group of passerine birds that occur mainly but not exclusively in the Old World. They are plump, soft plumaged, small to medium-sized insectivores or sometimes omnivores, often feeding on the ground. Many have attractive songs.

- Eastern bluebird (merlebleu de l'Est), Sialia sialis
- Mountain bluebird (merlebleu azuré), Sialia currucoides (C)
- Townsend's solitaire (solitaire de Townsend), Myadestes townsendi (C)
- Veery (grive fauve), Catharus fuscescens
- Grey-cheeked thrush (grive à joues grises), Catharus minimus
- Bicknell's thrush (grive de Bicknell), Catharus bicknelli
- Swainson's thrush (grive à dos olive), Catharus ustulatus
- Hermit thrush (grive solitaire), Catharus guttatus
- Wood thrush (grive des bois), Hylocichla mustelina
- Fieldfare (grive litorne), Turdus pilaris (C)
- Redwing (grive mauvis), Turdus iliacus (C)
- Song thrush (grive musicienne), Turdus philomelos (C)
- American robin (merle d'Amérique), Turdus migratorius
- Varied thrush (grive à collier), Ixoreus naevius (C)

== Old World flycatchers ==
Order: Passeriformes Family: Muscicapidae

The Old World flycatchers are a large family of small passerine birds. These are mainly small arboreal insectivores, many of which, as the name implies, take their prey on the wing.

- Northern wheatear (traquet motteux), Oenanthe oenanthe
- European robin (rouge-gorge) Erithacus rubecula (C)

== Old World sparrows ==
Order: Passeriformes Family: Passeridae

Old World sparrows are small passerine birds. In general, sparrows tend to be small plump brownish or greyish birds with short tails and short powerful beaks. Sparrows are seed eaters, but they also consume small insects.

- House sparrow (moineau domestique), Passer domesticus (I)
- Eurasian tree sparrow, Passer montanus (I)

== Wagtails and pipits ==
Order: Passeriformes Family: Motacillidae

Motacillidae is a family of small passerine birds with medium to long tails. They include the wagtails, longclaws and pipits. They are slender ground-feeding insectivores of open country.

- White wagtail (bergeronnette grise), Motacilla alba (C)
- American pipit (pipit d'Amérique), Anthus rubescens

== Finches, euphonias, and allies ==
Order: Passeriformes Family: Fringillidae

Finches are seed-eating passerine birds, that are small to moderately large and have a strong beak, usually conical and in some species very large. All have twelve tail feathers and nine primaries. These birds have a bouncing flight with alternating bouts of flapping and gliding on closed wings, and most sing well.

- Brambling (pinson du Nord), Fringilla montifringilla (C)
- Evening grosbeak (gros-bec errant), Coccothraustes vespertinus
- Pine grosbeak (durbec des sapins), Pinicola enucleator
- Grey-crowned rosy-finch (roselin à tête grise), Leucosticte tephrocotis (C)
- House finch (roselin familier), Haemorhous mexicanus (Native to the southwestern U.S.; introduced in the east)
- Purple finch (roselin pourpré), Haemorhous purpureus
- Common redpoll (sizerin flammé), Acanthis flammea
- Hoary redpoll (sizerin blanchâtre), Acanthis hornemanni
- Red crossbill (bec-croisé des sapins), Loxia curvirostra
- White-winged crossbill (bec-croisé bifascié), Loxia leucoptera
- Pine siskin (tarin des pins), Spinus pinus
- American goldfinch (chardonneret jaune), Spinus tristis

== Longspurs and snow buntings ==
Order: Passeriformes Family: Calcariidae

The Calcariidae are a group of passerine birds that were traditionally grouped with the New World sparrows, but differ in a number of respects and are usually found in open grassy areas.

- Lapland longspur (plectrophane lapon), Calcarius lapponicus
- Smith's longspur (plectrophane de Smith), Calcarius pictus (C)
- Snow bunting (plectrophane des neiges), Plectrophenax nivalis

== New World sparrows ==
Order: Passeriformes Family: Passerellidae

Until 2017, these species were considered part of the family Emberizidae. Most of the species are known as sparrows, but these birds are not closely related to the Old World sparrows which are in the family Passeridae. Many of these have distinctive head patterns.

- Grasshopper sparrow (bruant sauterelle), Ammodramus savannarum
- Black-throated sparrow (bruant à gorge noire), Amphispiza bilineata (C)
- Lark sparrow (bruant à joues marron), Chondestes grammacus (C)
- Lark bunting (bruant noir et blanc), Calamospiza melanocorys (C)
- Chipping sparrow (bruant familier), Spizella passerina
- Clay-coloured sparrow (bruant des plaines), Spizella pallida
- Field sparrow (bruant des champs), Spizella pusilla
- Brewer's sparrow (bruant de Brewer), Spizella breweri (C)
- Fox sparrow (bruant fauve), Passerella iliaca
- American tree sparrow (bruant hudsonien), Spizelloides arborea
- Dark-eyed junco (junco ardoisé), Junco hyemalis
- White-crowned sparrow (bruant à couronne blanche), Zonotrichia leucophrys
- Golden-crowned sparrow (bruant à couronne dorée), Zonotrichia atricapilla (C)
- Harris's sparrow (bruant à face noire), Zonotrichia querula (C)
- White-throated sparrow (bruant à gorge blanche), Zonotrichia albicollis
- Vesper sparrow (bruant vespéral), Pooecetes gramineus
- LeConte's sparrow (bruant de LeConte), Ammospiza leconteii
- Seaside sparrow (bruant maritime), Ammospiza maritimus (C)
- Nelson's sparrow (bruant de Nelson), Ammospiza nelsoni
- Henslow's sparrow (bruant de Henslow), Centronyx henslowii
- Savannah sparrow (bruant des prés), Passerculus sandwichensis
- Song sparrow (bruant chanteur), Melospiza melodia
- Lincoln's sparrow (bruant de Lincoln), Melospiza lincolnii
- Swamp sparrow (bruant des marais), Melospiza georgiana
- Green-tailed towhee (tohi à queue verte), Pipilo chlorurus (C)
- Spotted towhee (tohi tacheté), Pipilo maculatus (C)
- Eastern towhee (tohi à flancs roux), Pipilo erythrophthalmus

== Yellow-breasted chat ==
Order: Passeriformes Family: Icteriidae

This species was historically placed in the wood-warblers (Parulidae) but nonetheless most authorities were unsure if it belonged there. It was placed in its own family in 2017.

- Yellow-breasted chat (ictérie polyglotte), Icteria virens (C)

== Troupials and allies ==
Order: Passeriformes Family: Icteridae

The icterids are a group of small to medium-sized, often colourful passerine birds restricted to the New World and include the grackles, New World blackbirds, and New World orioles. Most species have black as a predominant plumage colour, often enlivened by yellow, orange, or red.

- Yellow-headed blackbird (carouge à tête jaune), Xanthocephalus xanthocephalus (C)
- Bobolink (goglu des prés), Dolichonyx oryzivorus
- Eastern meadowlark (sturnelle des prés), Sturnella magna
- Western meadowlark (sturnelle de l'Ouest), Sturnella neglecta
- Orchard oriole (oriole des vergers), Icterus spurius
- Hooded oriole (oriole masqué), Icterus cucullatus (C)
- Bullock's oriole (oriole de Bullock), Icterus bullockii (C)
- Baltimore oriole (oriole de Baltimore), Icterus galbula
- Red-winged blackbird (carouge à épaulettes), Agelaius phoeniceus
- Brown-headed cowbird (vacher à tête brune), Molothrus ater
- Rusty blackbird (quiscale rouilleux), Euphagus carolinus
- Brewer's blackbird (quiscale de Brewer), Euphagus cyanocephalus (C)
- Common grackle (quiscale bronzé), Quiscalus quiscula

== New World warblers ==
Order: Passeriformes Family: Parulidae

The wood-warblers are a group of small, often colourful, passerine birds restricted to the New World. Most are arboreal, but some are more terrestrial. Most members of this family are insectivores.

- Ovenbird (paruline couronnée), Seiurus aurocapilla
- Worm-eating warbler (paruline vermivore), Helmitheros vermivorum (C)
- Louisiana waterthrush (paruline hochequeue), Parkesia motacilla
- Northern waterthrush (paruline des ruisseaux), Parkesia noveboracensis
- Golden-winged warbler (paruline à ailes dorées), Vermivora chrysoptera
- Blue-winged warbler (paruline à ailes bleues), Vermivora cyanoptera
- Black-and-white warbler (paruline noir et blanc), Mniotilta varia
- Prothonotary warbler (paruline orangée), Protonotaria citrea (C)
- Tennessee warbler (paruline obscure), Leiothlypis peregrina
- Orange-crowned warbler (paruline verdâtre), Leiothlypis celata
- Nashville warbler (paruline à joues grises), Leiothlypis ruficapilla
- Connecticut warbler (paruline à gorge grise), Oporornis agilis
- Mourning warbler (paruline triste), Geothlypis philadelphia
- Kentucky warbler (paruline du Kentucky), Geothlypis formosa (C)
- Common yellowthroat (paruline masquée), Geothlypis trichas
- Hooded warbler (paruline à capuchon), Setophaga citrina (C)
- American redstart (paruline flamboyante), Setophaga ruticilla
- Kirtland's warbler (paruline de Kirtland), Setophaga kirtlandii (C)
- Cape May warbler (paruline tigrée), Setophaga tigrina
- Cerulean warbler (paruline azurée), Setophaga cerulea
- Northern parula (paruline à collier), Setophaga americana
- Magnolia warbler (paruline à tête cendrée), Setophaga magnolia
- Bay-breasted warbler (paruline à poitrine baie), Setophaga castanea
- Blackburnian warbler (paruline à gorge orangée), Setophaga fusca
- Yellow warbler (paruline jaune), Setophaga petechia
- Chestnut-sided warbler (paruline à flancs marron), Setophaga pensylvanica
- Blackpoll warbler (paruline rayée), Setophaga striata
- Black-throated blue warbler (paruline bleue), Setophaga caerulescens
- Palm warbler (paruline à couronne rousse), Setophaga palmarum
- Pine warbler (paruline des pins), Setophaga pinus
- Yellow-rumped warbler (paruline à croupion jaune), Setophaga coronata
- Yellow-throated warbler (paruline à gorge jaune), Setophaga dominica (C)
- Prairie warbler (paruline des prés), Setophaga discolor (C)
- Black-throated grey warbler (paruline grise), Setophaga nigrescens (C)
- Townsend's warbler (paruline de Townsend), Setophaga townsendi (C)
- Hermit warbler (paruline à tête jaune), Setophaga occidentalis (C)
- Black-throated green warbler (paruline à gorge noire), Setophaga virens
- Canada warbler (paruline du Canada), Cardellina canadensis
- Wilson's warbler (paruline à calotte noire), Cardellina pusilla
- Painted redstart (paruline à ailes blanches), Myioborus pictus (C)

== Cardinals and allies ==
Order: Passeriformes Family: Cardinalidae

The cardinals are a family of robust, seed-eating birds with strong bills. They are typically associated with open woodland. The sexes usually have distinct plumages.

- Hepatic tanager (piranga orangé), Piranga flava (C)
- Summer tanager (piranga vermillon), Piranga rubra (C)
- Scarlet tanager (piranga écarlate), Piranga olivacea
- Western tanager (piranga à tête rouge), Piranga ludoviciana (C)
- Northern cardinal (cardinal rouge), Cardinalis cardinalis
- Rose-breasted grosbeak (cardinal à poitrine rose), Pheucticus ludovicianus
- Black-headed grosbeak (cardinal à tête noire), Pheucticus melanocephalus (C)
- Blue grosbeak (guiraca bleu), Passerina caerulea (C)
- Lazuli bunting (passerin azuré), Passerina amoena (C)
- Indigo bunting (passerin indigo), Passerina cyanea
- Painted bunting (passerin nonpareil), Passerina ciris (C)
- Dickcissel (dickcissel d'Amérique), Spiza americana (C)

== See also ==
- List of birds in Mont-Tremblant National Park
- List of birds of Canada
- List of Migratory Bird Sanctuaries of Canada
- Lists of birds by region
- List of mammals of Quebec
- List of reptiles of Quebec
- List of amphibians of Quebec
- List of trees of Quebec
