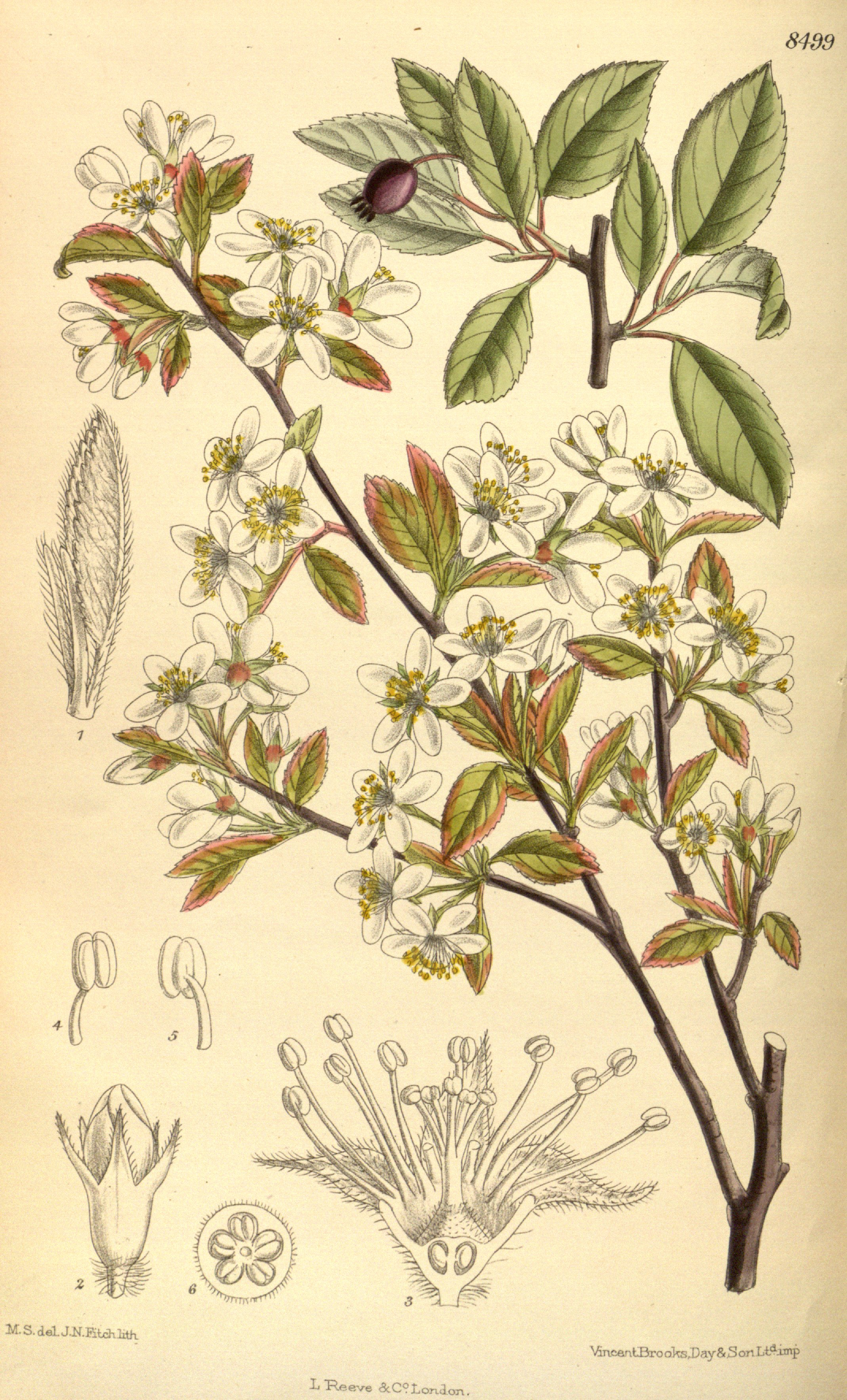

Conservation status
- Least Concern (IUCN 3.1)

Scientific classification
- Kingdom: Plantae
- Clade: Tracheophytes
- Clade: Angiosperms
- Clade: Eudicots
- Clade: Rosids
- Order: Rosales
- Family: Rosaceae
- Genus: Amelanchier
- Species: A. bartramiana

Binomial name
- Amelanchier bartramiana (Tausch) M.Roem.

Synonyms
- Pyrus bartramiana Tausch

= Amelanchier bartramiana =

Species of flowering plant

Amelanchier bartramiana is a species of serviceberry. Common names include mountain serviceberry, mountain shadbush, Bartram's serviceberry, mountain juneberry, Bartram juneberry, and the oblongfruit serviceberry.

The leaves of A. bartramiana are either brown or green coloured, are egg-shaped and tapered at both ends with fine teeth almost to the base. It has 6–12 teeth while its lateral veins comes 10–16 pairs. Its petioles are 2–10 millimetres (0.079–0.394 in) long while its blades are ovate and elliptic. The flowers have five white petals, appearing singly or in clusters of up to four blossoms. The pomes are red, ripening to dark purple and are pear-shaped. The fruits are edible and can be eaten raw or cooked.

== See also ==
- Cranberry Glades, West Virginia
