= List of amphibians of Quebec =

Amphibians in Quebec are classified into two orders: Caudata — which includes salamanders and newts — and Anura — which includes toads and frogs. The first order comprises ten species classified in four families, and the second order also comprises ten species classified in three families.

== Caudata ==
| Photo | Names (common / scientific) | IUCN Status | Notes | Distribution map |
|---|---|---|---|---|
Family Proteidae
| | Common mudpuppy Necturus maculosus | LC | Common and widespread in the Saint Lawrence River, Ottawa River, and Richelieu River. Often caught by ice fishing enthusiasts and commercial fishing operations. | |
Family Salamandridae
| | Eastern red-spotted newt Notophthalmus viridescens | LC | Common and widespread in Quebec. | |
Family Ambystomatidae
| | Spotted salamander Ambystoma maculatum | LC | Common and widespread in Quebec. This species can live up to 32 years. | |
| | Blue-spotted salamander Ambystoma laterale | LC | Common and widespread in Quebec. | |
Family Plethodontidae
| | Northern dusky salamander Desmognathus fuscus | LC | This species is likely to be designated as threatened or vulnerable in Quebec. | |
| | Allegheny Mountain dusky salamander Desmognathus ochrophaeus | LC | This species is designated as threatened in Quebec. COSEWIC considers the Appalachian population as critically endangered. The rarest salamander in the province, found only on the north slope of Covey Hill in Havelock, where it was first observed in 1988. | |
| | Northern two-lined salamander Eurycea bislineata | LC | Common and widespread in Quebec. | |
| | Northern spring salamander Gyrinophilus porphyriticus | LC | This species is designated as vulnerable in Quebec. COSEWIC considers this species threatened. | |
| | Four-toed salamander Hemidactylium scutatum | LC | This species is likely to be designated as threatened or vulnerable in Quebec. | |
| | Eastern red-backed salamander Plethodon cinereus | LC | Common and widespread in Quebec. | |

== Anura ==
| Photo | Names (common / scientific) | IUCN Status | Notes | Distribution map |
|---|---|---|---|---|
Family Bufonidae
| | American toad Anaxyrus americanus | LC | Common and widespread in Quebec. | |
Family Hylidae
| | Gray treefrog Dryophytes versicolor | LC | Common and widespread in Quebec. | |
| | Spring peeper Pseudacris crucifer | LC | Common and widespread in Quebec. | |
| | Western chorus frog Pseudacris triseriata | LC | Following a revision of the genus Pseudacris, the population of Western chorus frog in Quebec and eastern Ontario is now considered to belong to the species Boreal chorus frog. The Western chorus frog is no longer a species present in Quebec. | |
| | Boreal chorus frog Pseudacris maculata | LC | This species is likely to be designated as threatened or vulnerable in Quebec. | |
Family Ranidae
| | Wood frog Lithobates sylvaticus | LC | Common and widespread in Quebec. The most northern amphibian in North America, the only one whose range extends beyond the Arctic Circle and reaches the Arctic Ocean. | |
| | Northern leopard frog Lithobates pipiens | LC | Common and widespread in Quebec. Introduced to Anticosti Island in 1899. It is legal to hunt this species in Quebec. | |
| | Pickerel frog Lithobates palustris | LC | This species is likely to be designated as threatened or vulnerable in Quebec. | |
| | Green frog Lithobates clamitans | LC | Common and widespread in Quebec. Introduced to Anticosti Island, the Magdalen Islands, Newfoundland, and British Columbia. It is legal to hunt this species in Quebec. | |
| | Mink frog Lithobates septentrionalis | LC | Common and widespread in Quebec. Introduced to Anticosti Island. | |
| | American bullfrog Lithobates catesbeianus | LC | Common and widespread in Quebec. It is legal to hunt this species in Quebec. | |

== See also ==
- List of birds of Quebec
- List of trees of Quebec
