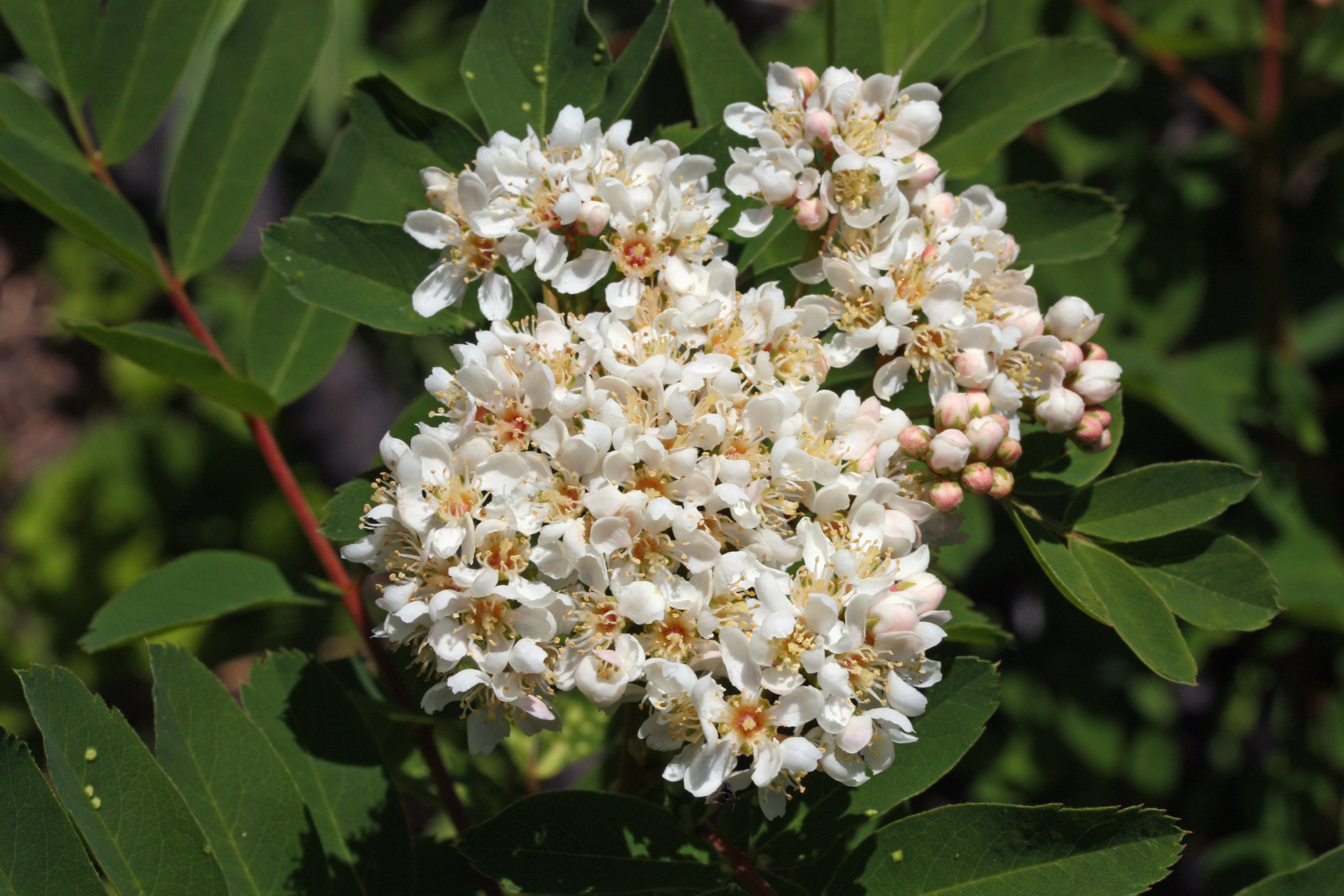
- Flower cymes

Scientific classification
- Kingdom: Plantae
- Clade: Tracheophytes
- Clade: Angiosperms
- Clade: Eudicots
- Clade: Rosids
- Order: Rosales
- Family: Rosaceae
- Genus: Sorbus
- Species: S. sitchensis

Binomial name
- Sorbus sitchensis M.Roem.
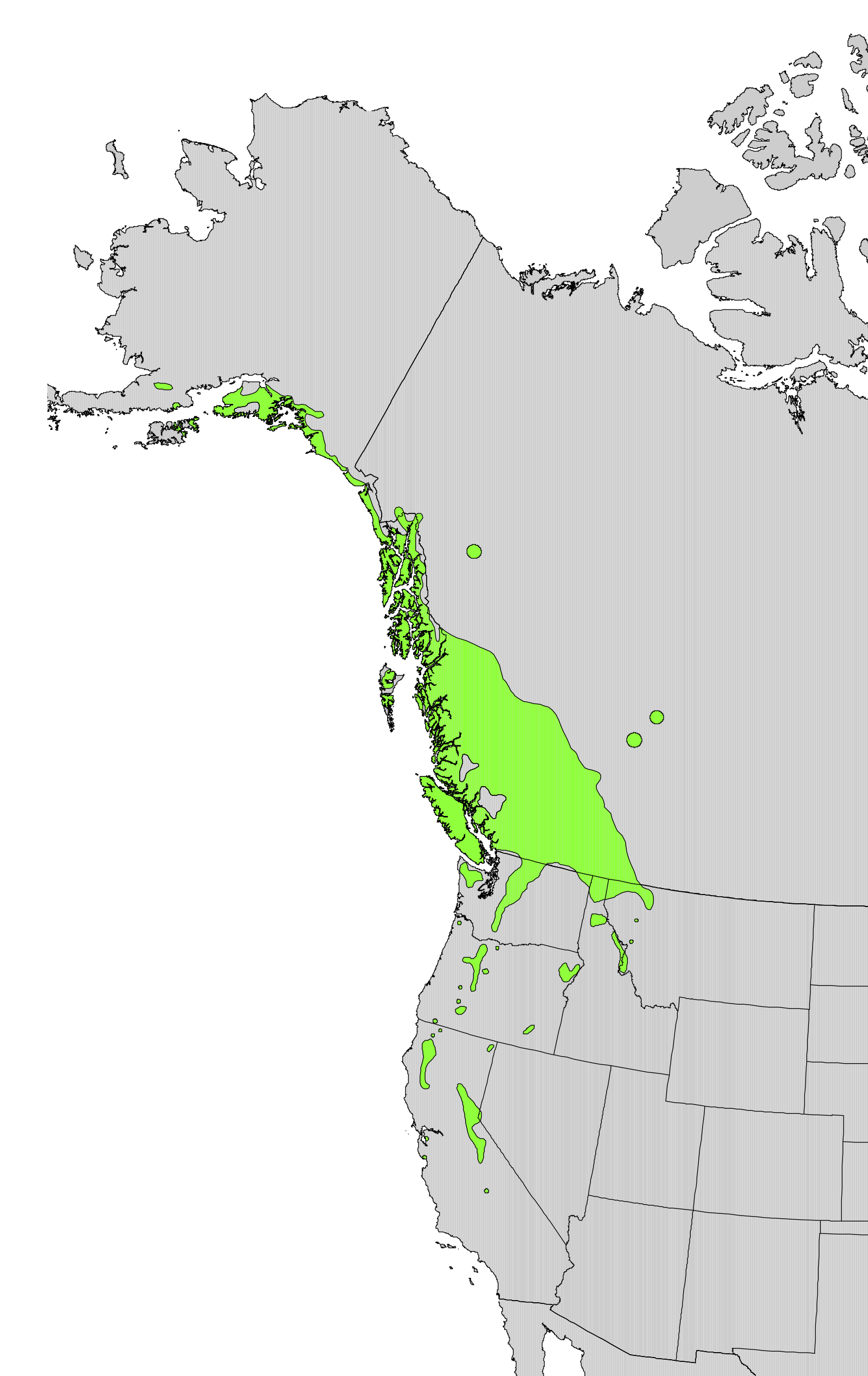
- Range of Sorbus sitchensis

Synonyms
- Pyrus sitchensis (M.Roem.) Piper; Pyrus sambucifolia Bong.; Sorbus tilingii Gand.

= Sorbus sitchensis =

Sitka mountain-ash

Species of plant

Sorbus sitchensis, commonly known as western mountain ash and Sitka mountain-ash, is a small species of shrub of northwestern North America.

== Description ==
It forms a multi-stemmed plant, either a shrub or small tree, reaching heights of 1–4 metres (3 1/2–13 ft). The winter buds are not sticky, with rusty hairs.

The leaves are alternate, compound, six to ten inches long. There are 7–11 blue-green leaflets, lanceolate or long oval, with a rounded tip and usually toothed from the middle to end. In autumn, they turn yellow, orange and red. The stipules are leaf-like and caducous.

Cymes of 80 or fewer white flowers bloom from June through September (after the leaves are fully grown). The five-petaled flowers are less than a centimetre across. The cymes are flat, compound and three or four inches across.

The fruit is a berry-like pome, globular, one-quarter of an inch across, bright pinkish red, and borne in cymous clusters.

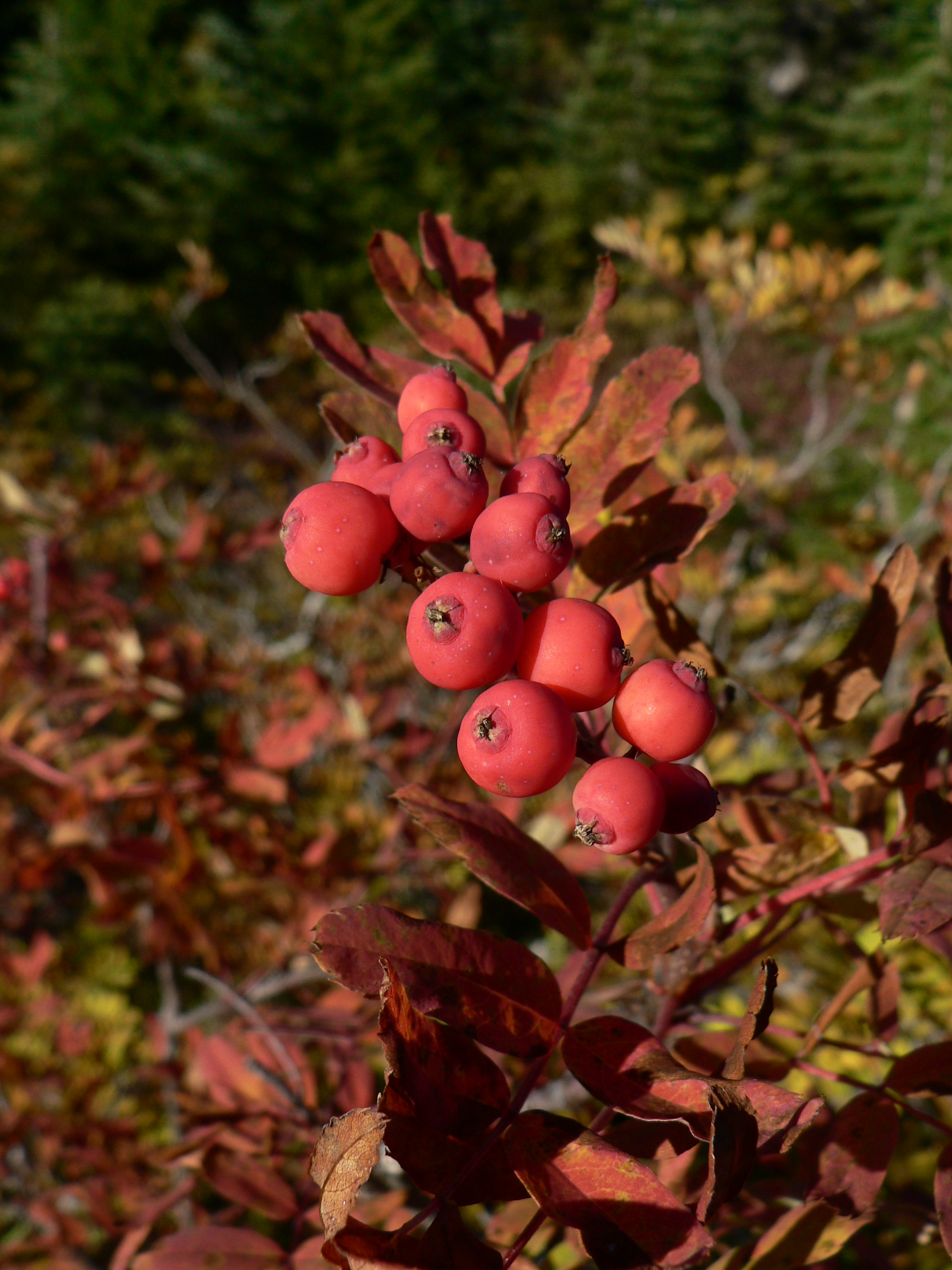
Fall foliage and fruit

=== Similar species ===
The otherwise similar Sorbus scopulina has yellow-green sharp-pointed leaflets that are sharply serrated over most of their length.

== Distribution and habitat ==
It is endemic to northwestern North America, from the Pacific coast of Alaska, to the mountains of Washington, Oregon and northern California and eastward to parts of Idaho and western Alberta and Montana. It is widespread in British Columbia.

It prefers moist, well-drained soils and is commonly found in mountainous regions, coastal forests, and along streambanks.

== Ecology ==
The berries are enjoyed by the Richardson's grouse and other birds in winter.

== Uses ==
The tart fruits are edible.
