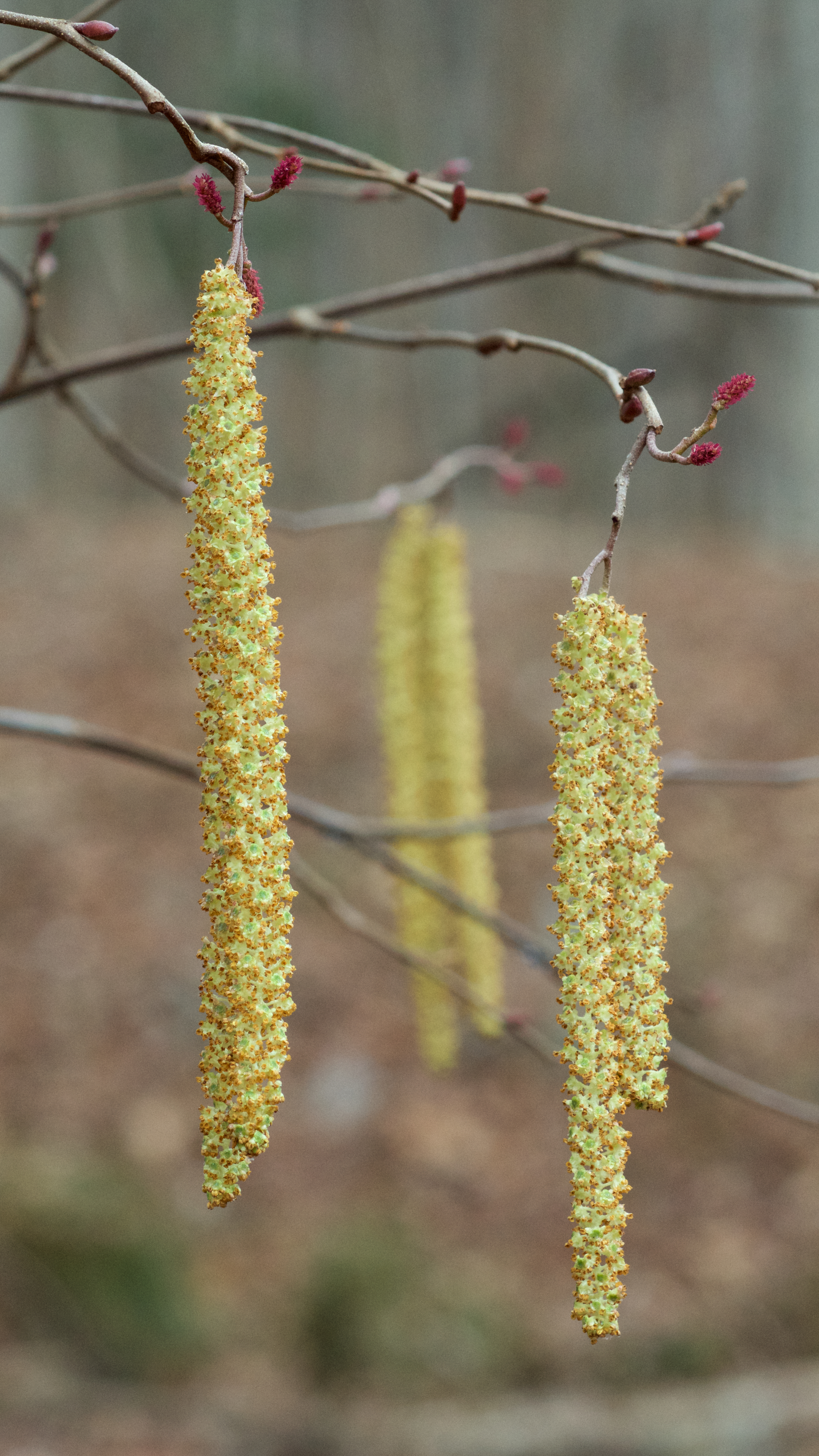

Conservation status
- Least Concern (IUCN 3.1)

Scientific classification
- Kingdom: Plantae
- Clade: Embryophytes
- Clade: Tracheophytes
- Clade: Angiosperms
- Clade: Eudicots
- Clade: Rosids
- Order: Fagales
- Family: Betulaceae
- Genus: Alnus
- Subgenus: Alnus subg. Alnus
- Species: A. serrulata

Binomial name
- Alnus serrulata (Aiton) Willd.
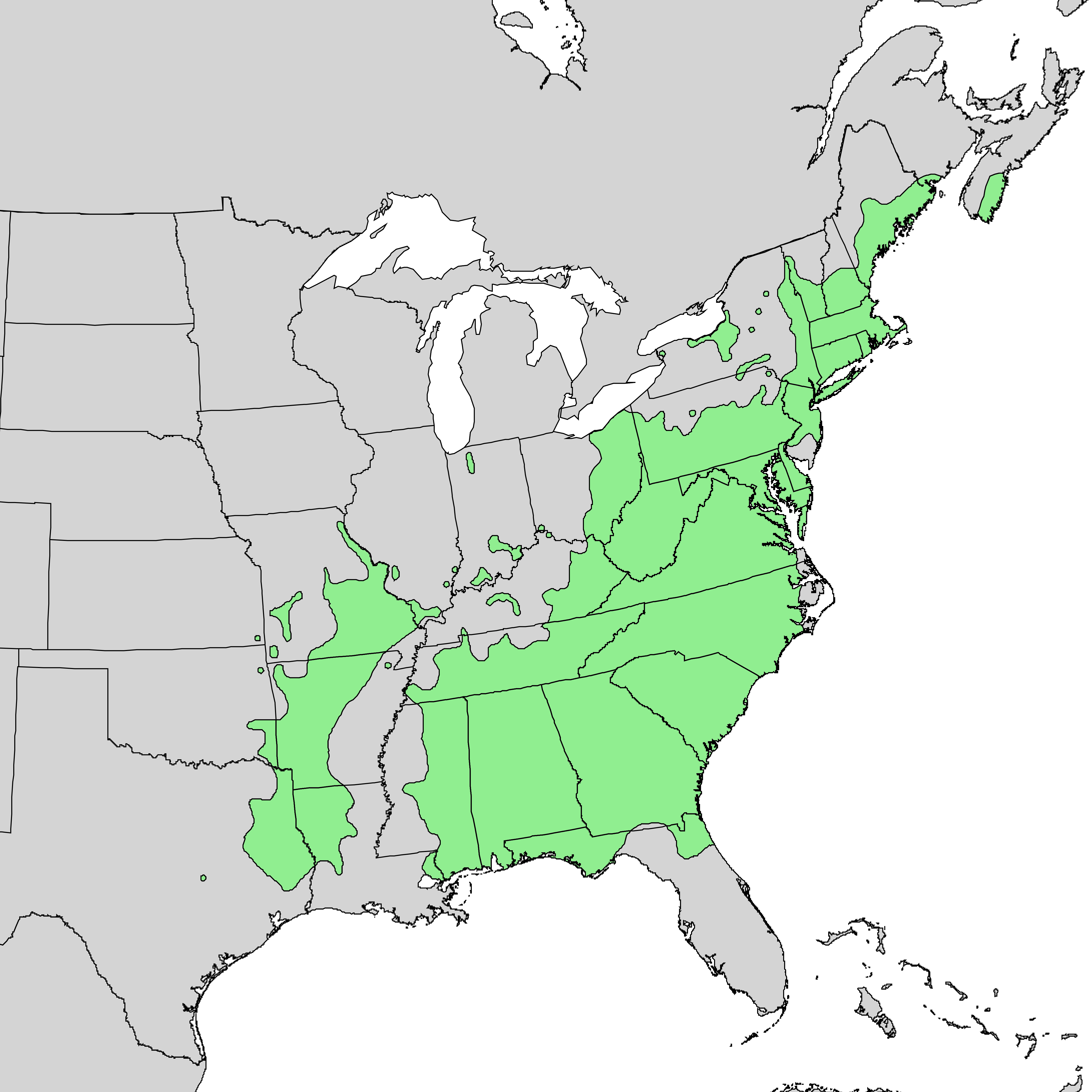
- Natural range

Synonyms
- List: Alnus incana var. serrulata (Aiton) B. Boivin; Alnus noveboracensis Britton; Alnus serrulata var. subelliptica Fernald; Betula serrulata Aiton; Alnus autumnalis Hartig ex Garcke; Betula oblongata Aiton; Alnus serrulata var. vulgaris Spach; Alnus serrulata var. obtusifolia (Regel) Regel; Alnus serrulata var. macrophylla Spach; Alnus serrulata var. genuina Regel; Alnus serrulata forma noveboracensis (Britton) Fernald; Alnus serrulata forma nanella Fernald; Alnus serrulata forma mollescens Fernald; Alnus serrulata forma emarginata Fernald; Alnus rugosa var. serrulata (Aiton) H. J. Winkler; Alnus rugos var. obtusifolia (Regel) H. Winkler; Alnus incana var. autumnalis (Hartig ex Garcke) Garcke; Alnus glutinosa var. serrulata (Aiton) Regel; Alnus glutinosa var. autumnalis (Hartig ex Garcke) Garcke; Alnus glutinosa obtusifolia Regel

= Alnus serrulata =

Species of tree

Alnus serrulata, the hazel alder or smooth alder, is a thicket-forming shrub in the family Betulaceae. It is native to eastern North America and can be found from western Nova Scotia and southern New Brunswick south to Florida and Texas.

== Description ==
Alnus serrulata is a large shrub or small tree that commonly grows up to 8–12 feet (2.4–3.7 m) high, exceptionally 30 ft (9.1 m) and 15 centimetres (5.9 in) in diameter. The scientific name originates from alnus which is an old name for alder; serrulata points to the finely-toothed leaf margins which it possesses. It takes about 10 years to mature. The plant prefers moist soil near streams, pond margins, and riversides and can be rooted under the water line. It can also be found growing on hills. It usually has multiple stems from its base and reddish-green flowers. The broad, flat, dark green leaves are about 2 to 4 inches long.

Leaf: The simple, round leaves are obovate, 3 to 5 in (7.6 to 12.7 cm) long, 1.2 to 2.8 in wide, obtuse, wider at middle, and V-shaped base. Veins are pinnate and conspicuous. Leaves have a smooth texture above and hairy texture below. The upper side of the leaves are dark green and the undersides are pale green.

Flower: The flowers are monoecious, meaning that both sexes are found on a single plant. Male (Staminate) catkins are 1.6-2.4 in long; female (Pistillate) catkins are 1/2 in long. Reddish-green flowers open in March to April.

Fruit: The ovate, dark brown, cone-like fruit is hard with winged scales. Seeds are produced in small cones and do not have wings. Fruit usually matures during fall and is quite persistent.

Twig: The twigs are reddish-brown and have a three-angled-pith; young twigs are covered with hairs.

Bark: The bark is brownish gray, smooth, and has a bitter and astringent taste.

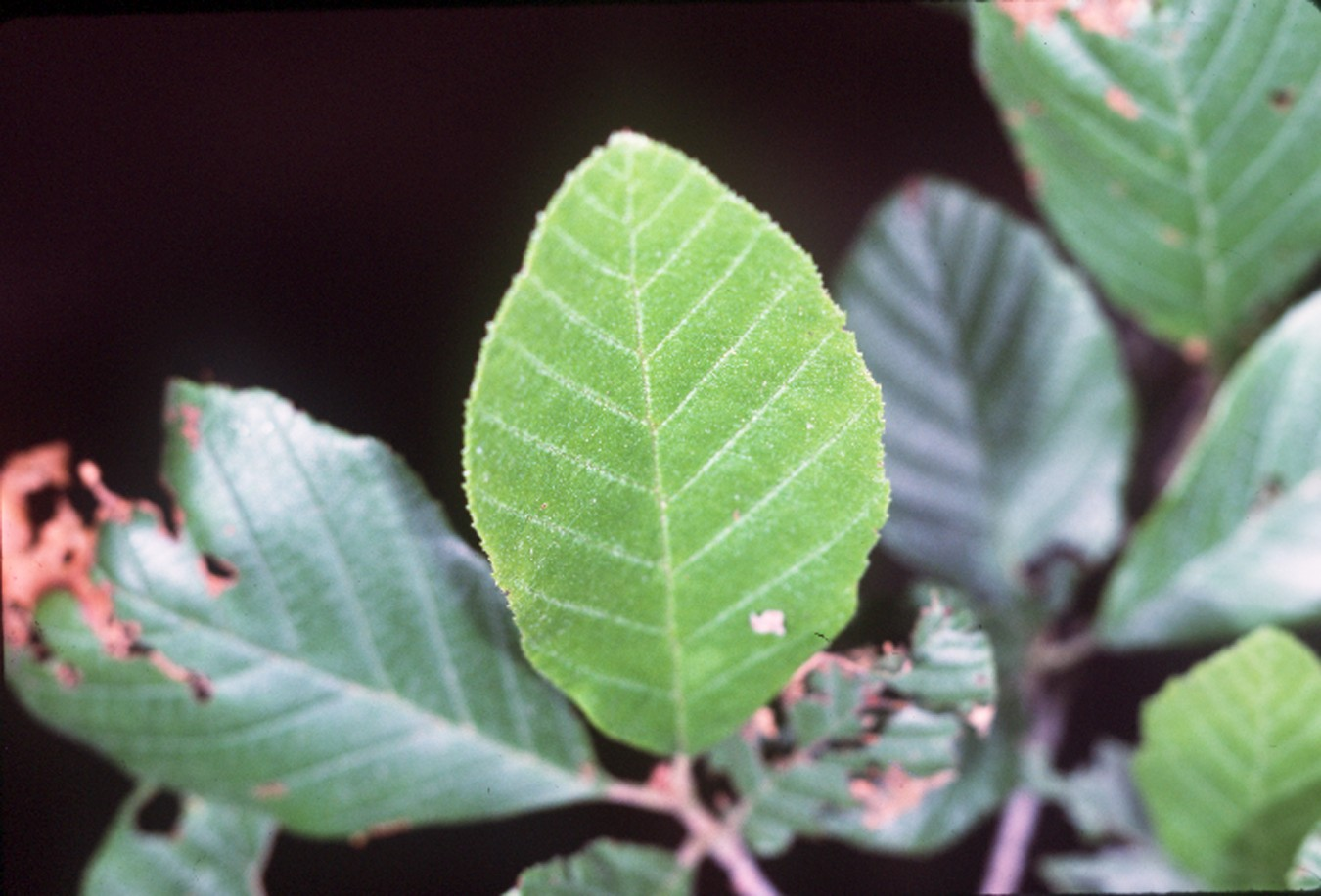
Leaves

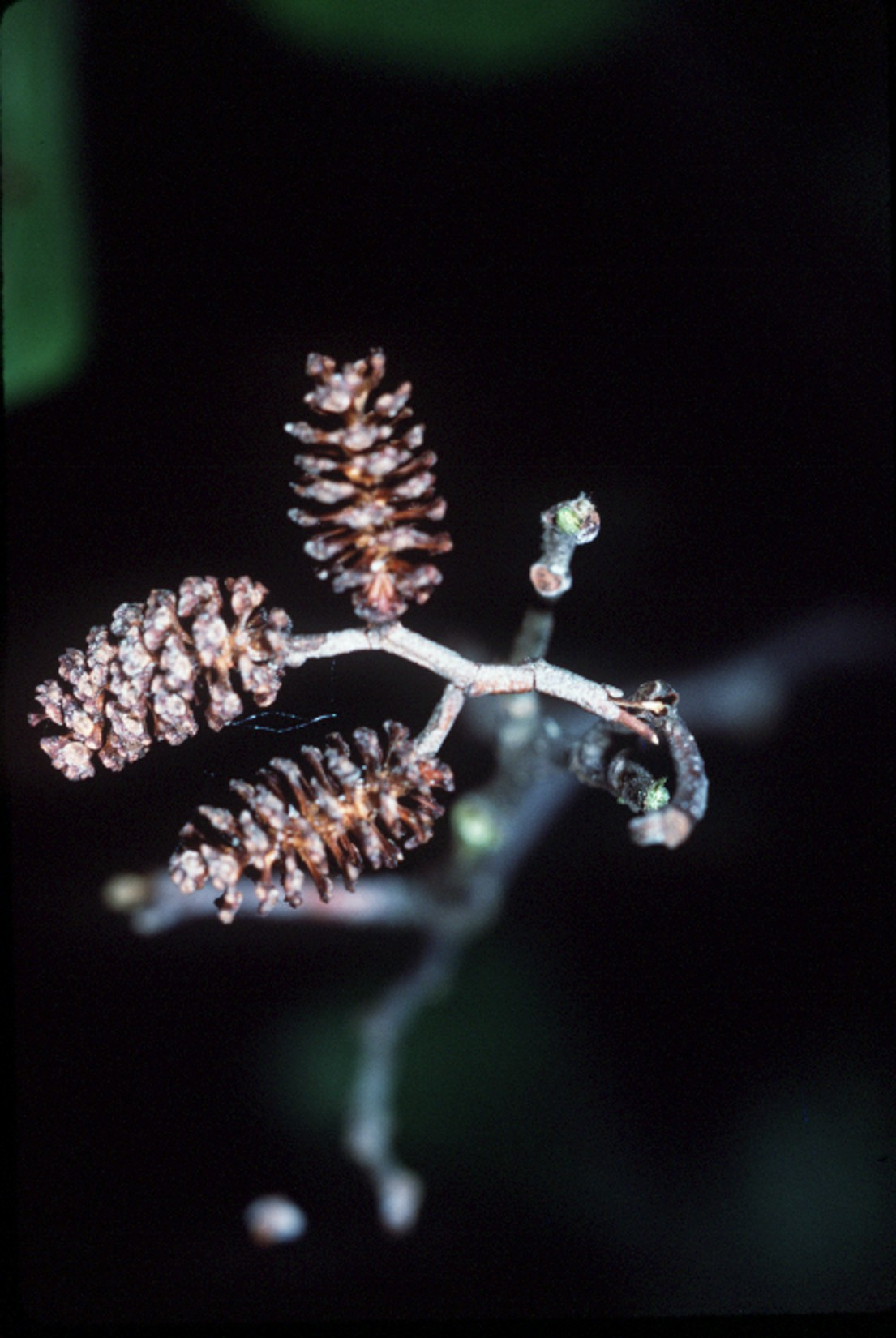
Seed cones

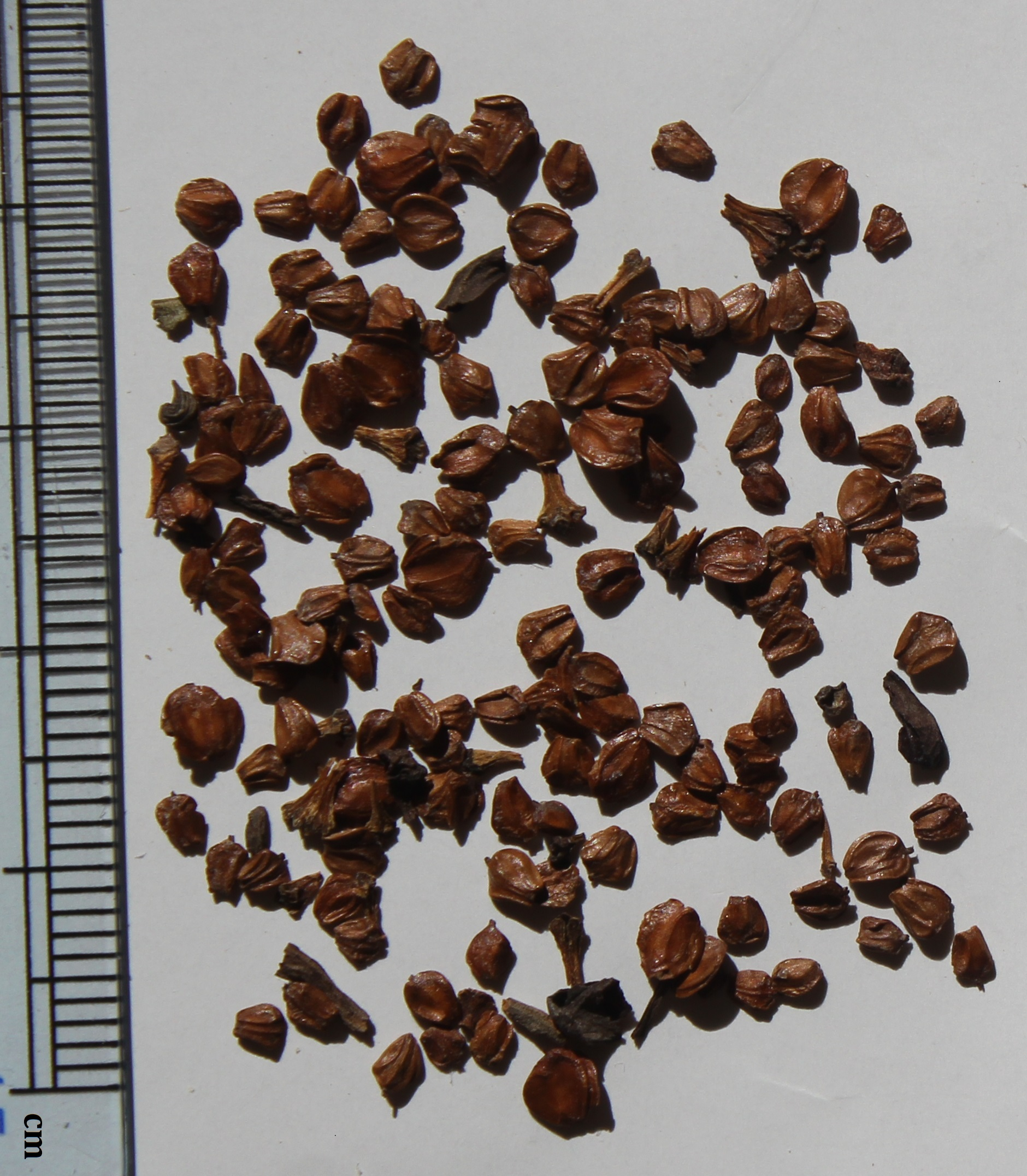
Seeds

== Distribution ==
Alnus serrulata is mainly located in eastern North America. It ranges from Maine to Northern Florida, west to southeastern Oklahoma, Missouri, and Illinois. It also grows along the Mississippi River. It is not present in northern New Hampshire and Vermont. Smooth alder is classified as an facultative wetland species in the Atlantic and Gulf Coastal Plains and an obligate wetland species in the North and Midwest.

== Taxonomy ==
The scientific name of smooth alder is Alnus serrulata (Aiton) Willd., synonymous with Alnus noveboracensis Britton, Alnus rubra Desfontaines ex Spach, Alnus rugosa (Du Roi) Sprengel, Alnus rugosa (Du Roi) Sprengel var. serrulata (W. Aiton) H. Winkler, Alnus serrulata (W. Aiton) Willdenow var. subelliptica Fernald, and Betula serrulata W. Aiton. It has English common names including common alder, tag alder, hazel alder, brookside alder and smooth alder.

== Cultivation ==
Alnus serrulata can be found in habitats such as streambanks, riversides, and swamps. Water use is high and it requires sun or part-sun. It also requires moist soil that has a pH of 6.8–7.2. Alnus serrulata needs 5–10-foot spacing in wildlife habitat.

== Uses ==
Because the plant resides in riversides or stream streambanks, it usually functions as a stabilizer and restorer for those habitats. It is also used to treat astringent, diuretic, emetic, ophthalmic, and purgative symptoms. A tea made from the bark was used by Native Americans as a treatment for diarrhea, coughs, toothaches, sore mouth, and the pain of birth. It has also been used as a treatment for acne in the form of a skin wash. An extract from the bark was used as an orange dye.
