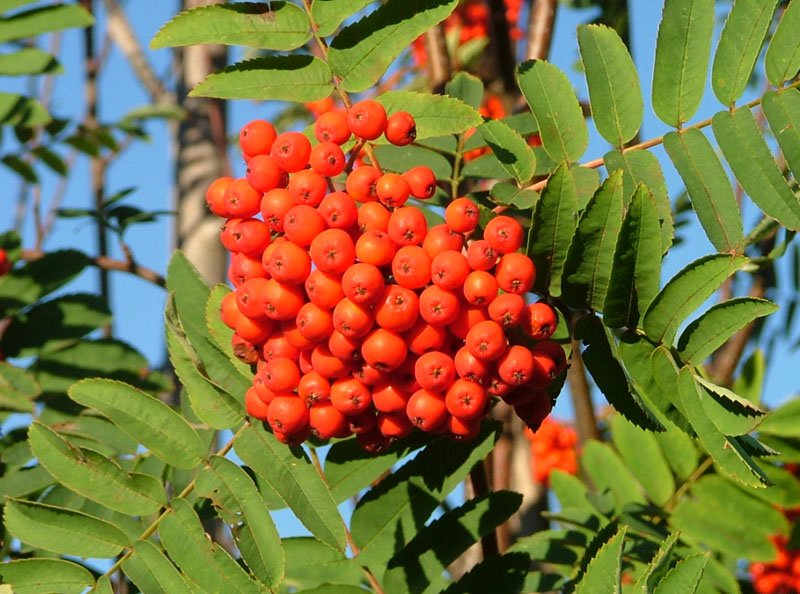
- European rowan fruit

Scientific classification
- Kingdom: Plantae
- Clade: Tracheophytes
- Clade: Angiosperms
- Clade: Eudicots
- Clade: Rosids
- Order: Rosales
- Family: Rosaceae
- Subtribe: Malinae
- Genus: Sorbus; L.

Species
- List of Sorbus species

Synonyms
- Aucuparia Rivinus ex Medik.; × Sorbotoraria Mezhenskyj

= Rowan =

Common name of a subgenus of flowering plants in the family Rosaceae

The rowans (/ˈraʊənz/ ROW-ənz or /ˈroʊənz/ ROH-ənz) or mountain-ashes are shrubs or trees in the genus Sorbus of the rose family, Rosaceae. They are native throughout the cool temperate regions of the Northern Hemisphere, with the highest species diversity in the Himalaya, southern Tibet and parts of western China, where numerous apomictic microspecies occur. The name rowan was originally applied to the species Sorbus aucuparia and is also used for other species in the genus Sorbus.

Natural hybrids, often including S. aucuparia and the whitebeam, Aria edulis (syn. Sorbus aria), give rise to many endemic variants in the UK.

== Names ==
The Latin name sorbus was borrowed into Old English as syrfe. The Latin name sorbus is from a root for 'red, reddish-brown' (Proto-Indo-European: *sor-/*ser-); English sorb is attested from the 1520s in the sense 'fruit of the service tree', adopted via French sorbe from Latin sorbum 'service-berry'. Sorbus domestica is also known as "whitty pear", the adjective whitty meaning "pinnate". The name "mountain-ash" for Sorbus domestica is due to a superficial similarity of the rowan leaves to those of the ash, not to be confused with Fraxinus ornus, a true ash that is also known as "mountain ash". Sorbus torminalis is also known as "chequer tree"; its fruits, formerly used to flavour beer, are called "chequers", perhaps from the spotted pattern of the fruit.

The traditional name rowan was applied to the species Sorbus aucuparia. The name rowan is recorded from 1804, detached from an earlier rowan-tree, rountree, attested from the 1540s in northern dialects of English and Scots. It is often thought to be from a North Germanic source, perhaps related to Old Norse reynir (compare Norwegian rogn, Danish røn, Swedish rönn), ultimately from the Germanic verb *raud-inan 'to redden', in reference to the berries (as is the Latin name sorbus). Various dialectal variants of rowan are found in English, including ran, roan, rodan, royan, royne, round, and rune.

The Old English name of the rowan is cwic-bēam, which survives in the name quickbeam (also quicken, quicken-tree, and variants). This name by the 19th century was reinterpreted as connected to the word witch, from a dialectal variant wick for quick and names such as wicken-tree, wich-tree, wicky, and wiggan-tree, giving rise to names such as witch-hazel and witch-tree.

The tree has two names in Welsh, cerdinen and criafol. Criafol may be translated as 'the lamenting fruit', likely derived from the Welsh tradition that the Cross of Christ was carved from the wood of this tree, and the subsequent association of the rowan's red fruit with the blood of Christ.

The Old Irish name is cairtheand, reflected in Modern Irish caorthann. The "arboreal" Bríatharogam in the Book of Ballymote associates the rowan with the letter luis, with the gloss "delightful to the eye (li sula) is luis, i.e. rowan (caertheand), owing to the beauty of its berries". Due to this, "delight of the eye" (vel sim.) has been reported as a "name of the rowan" by some commentators.

The most common Scottish Gaelic name is caorann (Scottish Gaelic pronunciation: [/kɯːrən/]), which appears in numerous Highland place names such as Beinn a' Chaorainn and Loch a' Chaorainn. Rowan was also the clan badge of the Malcolms and McLachlans. There were strong taboos in the Highlands against the use of any parts of the tree save the berries, except for ritual purposes. For example, a Gaelic threshing tool made of rowan and called a buaitean was used on grain meant for rituals and celebrations.

In the Canadian provinces of Newfoundland and Labrador and Nova Scotia, this species is commonly referred to as a dogberry tree. In German, Sorbus aucuparia is known as the Vogelbeerbaum ('bird-berry tree') or as Eberesche. The latter is a compound of the name of the ash tree (Esche) with what is contemporarily the name of the boar (Eber), but in fact the continuation of a Gaulish name, eburo- (also the name for a dark reddish-brown colour, cognate with Greek ὀρφνός orphnos, Old Norse iarpr 'brown'); like sorbus, eburo- seems to have referred to the colour of the berries; it is also recorded as a Gaulish name for the yew (which also has red berries), see also Eburodunum (disambiguation).

== Botany ==
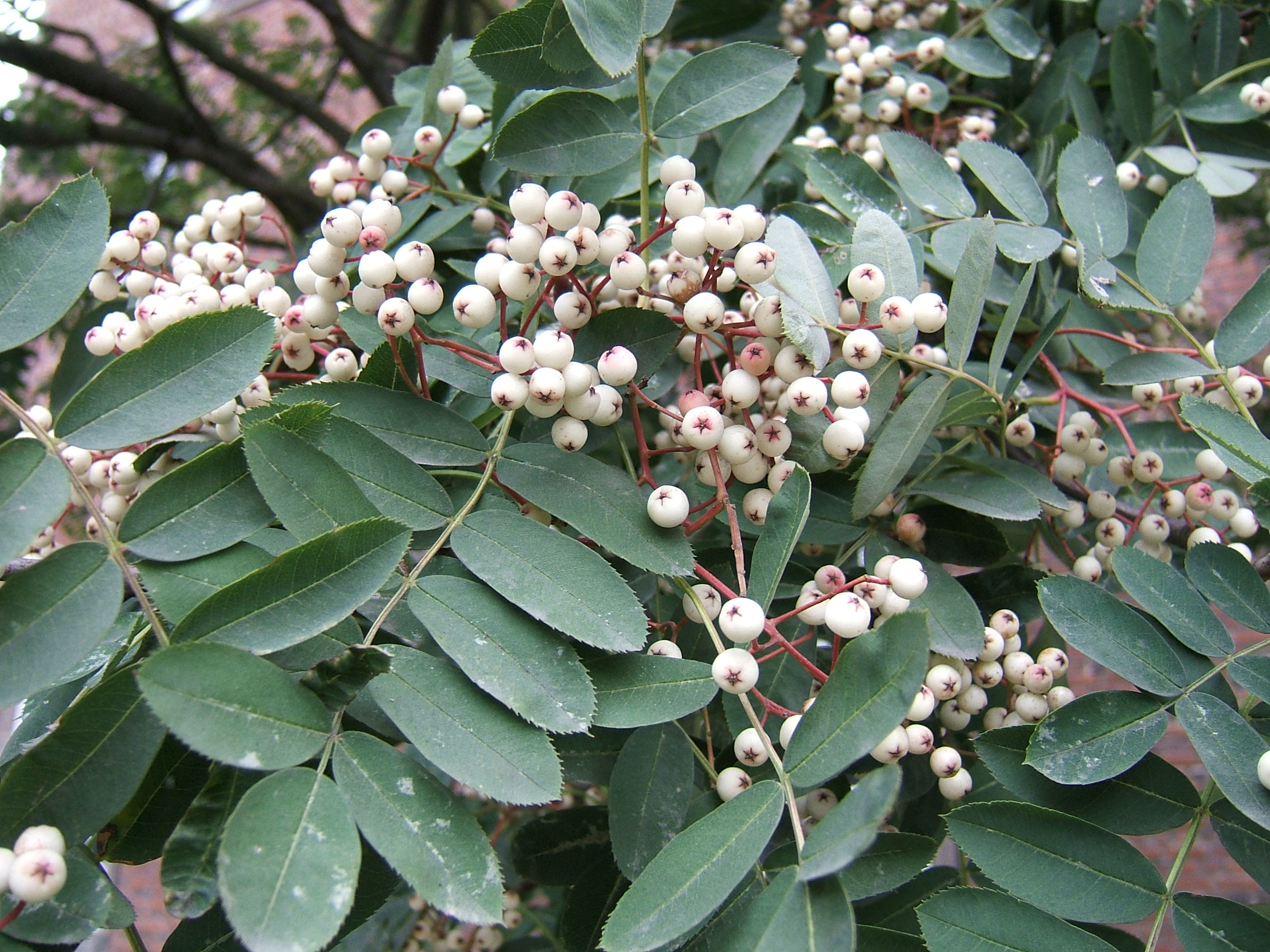
White-fruited rowan Sorbus glabrescens, a Chinese species with white fruit

Rowans are mostly small deciduous trees 10–20 metres (33–66 ft) tall, though a few are shrubs. Rowans are unrelated to the true ash trees of the genus Fraxinus, family Oleaceae. Though their leaves are superficially similar, those of Sorbus are alternate, while those of Fraxinus are opposite. Rowan leaves are arranged alternately, and are pinnate, with (7–)11–35 leaflets. A terminal leaflet is always present. The flowers are borne in dense corymbs; each flower is creamy white, and 5–10 millimetres (0.20–0.39 in) across with five petals. The fruit is a small pome 4–8 millimetres (0.16–0.31 in) diameter, bright orange or red in most species, but pink, yellow or white in some Asian species. The fruit are soft and juicy, which makes them a very good food for birds, particularly waxwings and thrushes, which then distribute the rowan seeds in their droppings. Due to their small size the fruits are often referred to as berries, but a true berry is a simple fruit produced from a single ovary, whereas a pome is an accessory fruit.

Rowan is used as a food plant by the larvae of some Lepidoptera species, such as the apple fruit moth Argyresthia conjugella.

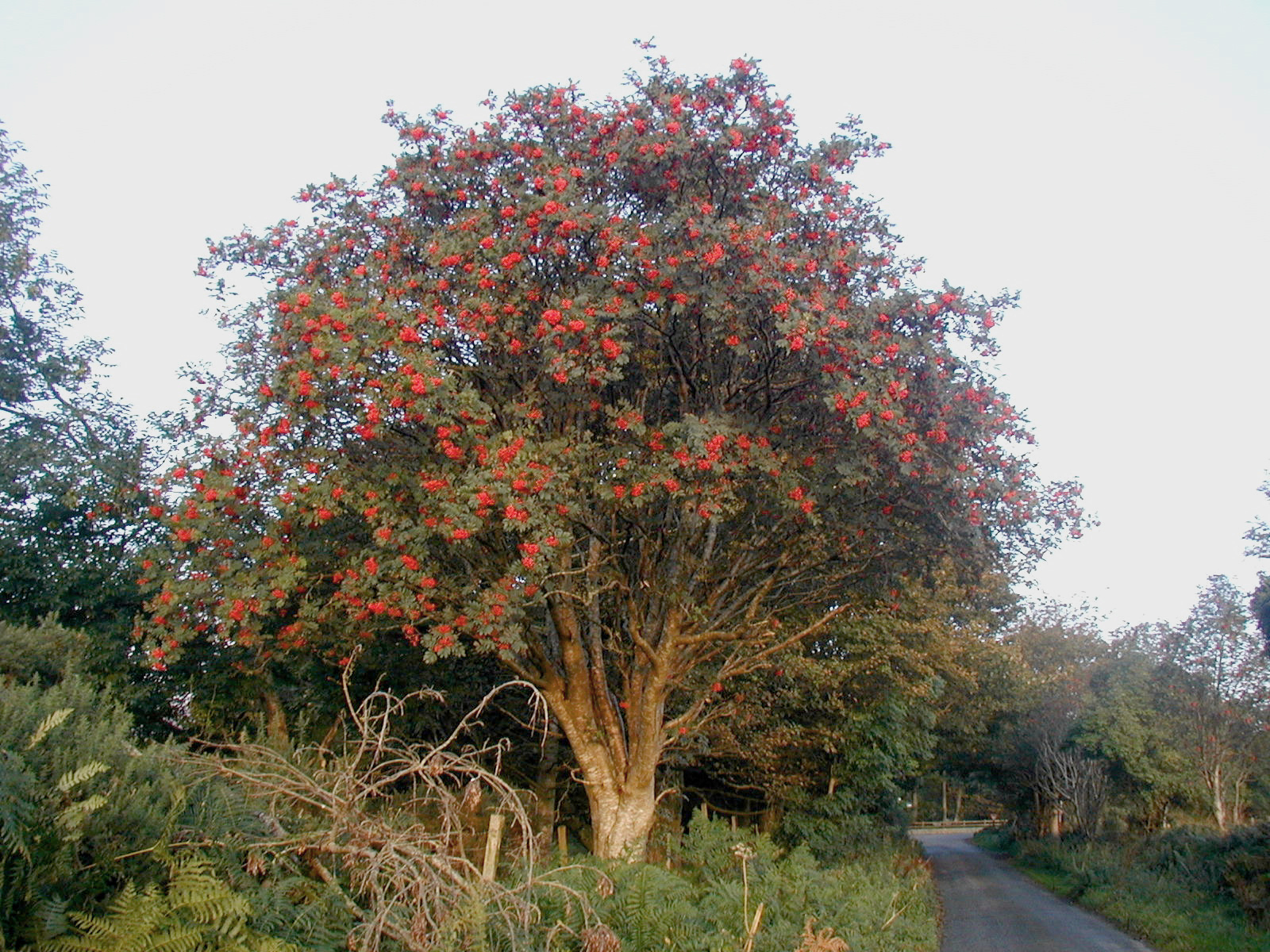
Mature European rowan tree

The best-known species is the European rowan Sorbus aucuparia, a small tree typically 4–12 metres (13–39 ft) tall growing in a variety of habitats throughout northern Europe and in mountains in southern Europe and southwest Asia. Its berries are a favourite food for many birds and are a traditional wild-collected food in Britain and Scandinavia. It is one of the hardiest European trees, occurring to 71° north in Vardø Municipality in the far northern part of Arctic Norway, and has also become widely naturalised in northern North America.

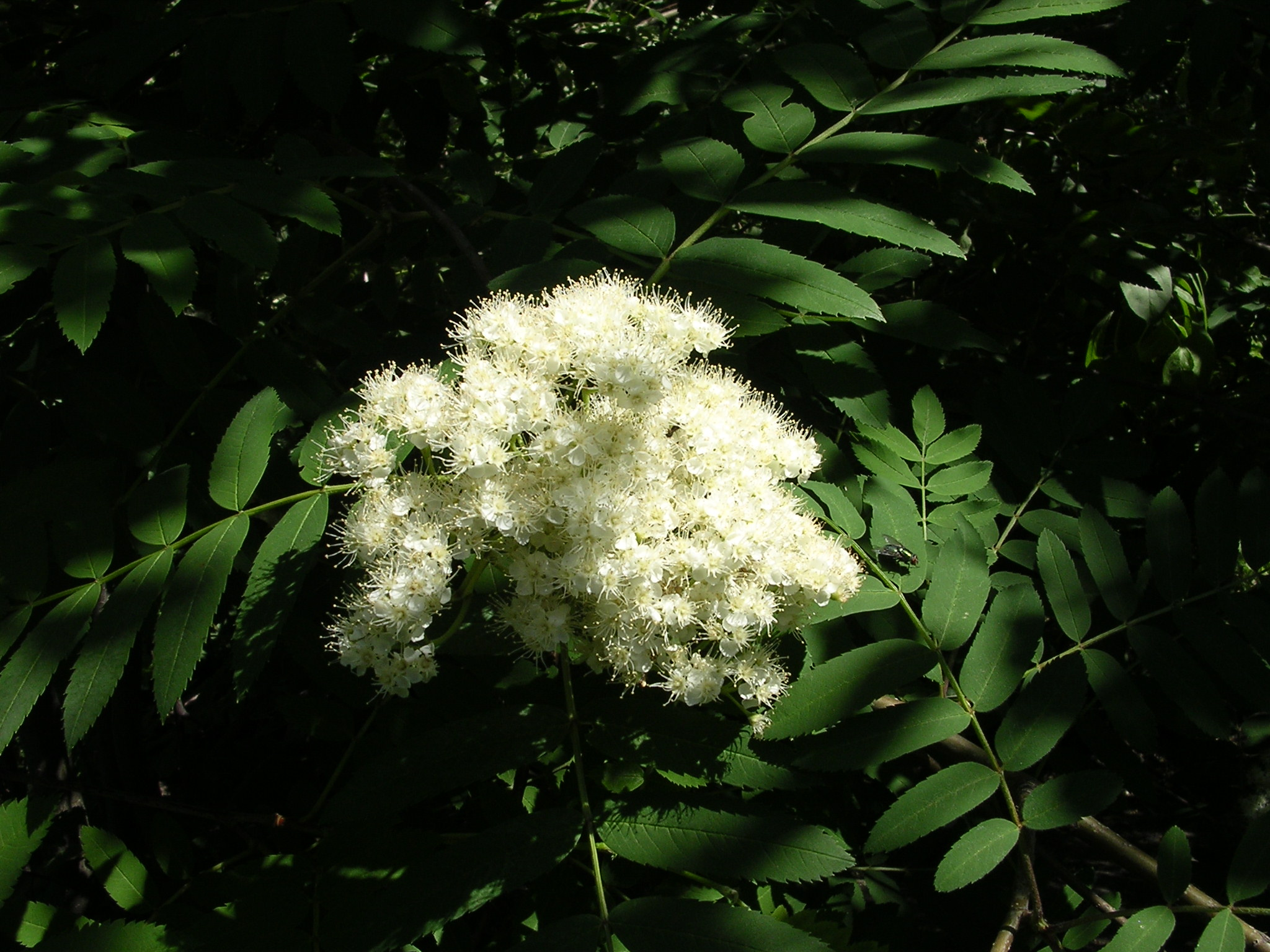
Rowan flowers

The greatest diversity of form as well as the largest number of rowan species is in Asia, with very distinctive species such as Sargent's rowan Sorbus sargentiana with large leaves 20–35 centimetres (8–14 in) long and 15–20 centimetres (6–8 in) broad and very large corymbs with 200–500 flowers, and at the other extreme, small-leaf rowan Sorbus microphylla with leaves 8–12 centimetres (3–5 in) long and 2.5–3 centimetres (0.98–1.18 in) broad. While most are trees, the dwarf rowan Sorbus reducta is a low shrub to 50 centimetres (20 in) tall. Several of the Asian species are widely cultivated as ornamental trees.

North American native species in the genus Sorbus include the American mountain-ash Sorbus americana and Showy mountain-ash Sorbus decora in the east and Sitka mountain-ash Sorbus sitchensis in the west.

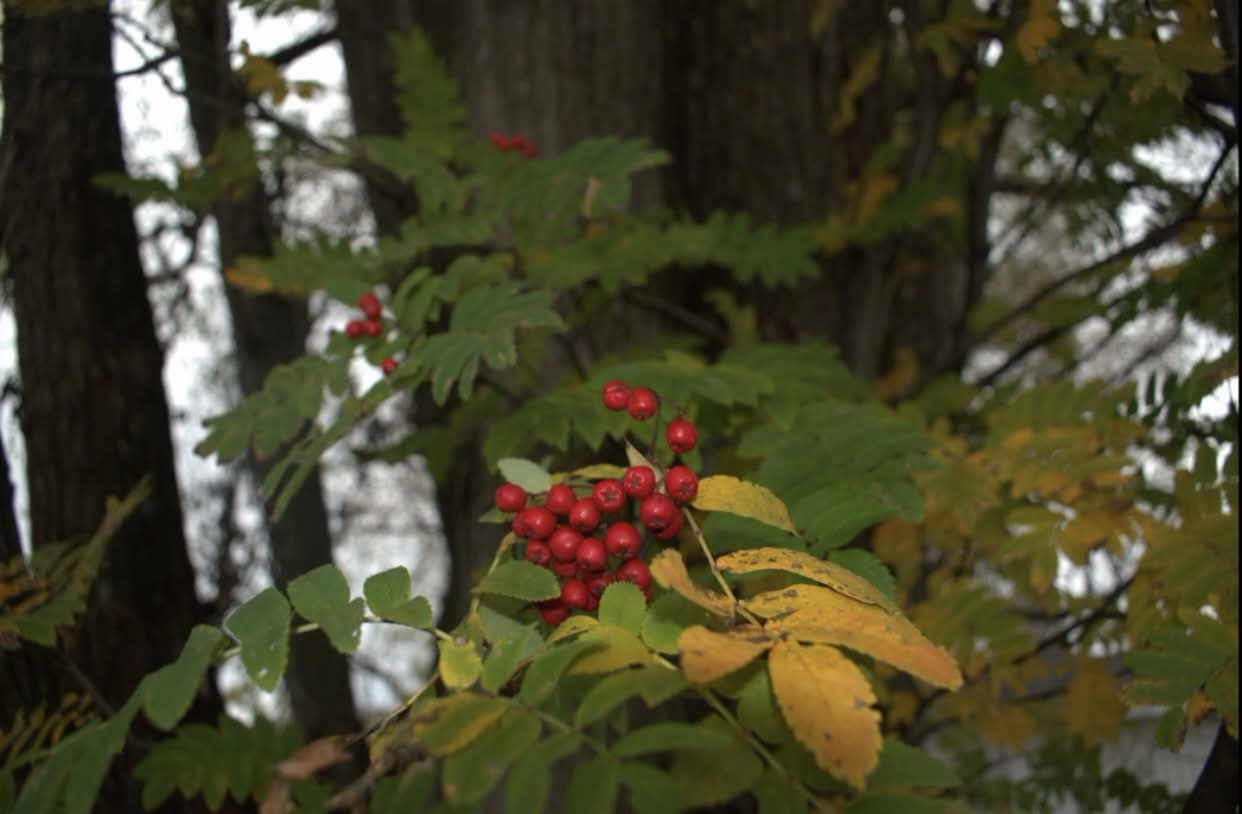

Numerous hybrids, mostly behaving as true species reproducing by apomixis, occur between rowans and whitebeams; these are variably intermediate between their parents but generally more resemble whitebeams and are usually grouped with them (q.v.).

== Uses ==
Rowans are excellent small ornamental trees for parks, gardens and wildlife areas. Several of the Asian species, such as white-fruited rowan (Sorbus oligodonta) are popular for their unusual fruit colour, and Sargent's rowan (Sorbus sargentiana) for its exceptionally large clusters of fruit. Numerous cultivars have also been selected for garden use, several of them, such as the yellow-fruited Sorbus 'Joseph Rock', of hybrid origin. They are very attractive to fruit-eating birds, which is reflected in the old name "bird catcher".

The wood is dense and used for carving and turning and for tool handles and walking sticks. Rowan fruit are a traditional source of tannins for mordanting vegetable dyes. In Finland, it has been a traditional wood of choice for horse sled shafts and rake spikes.

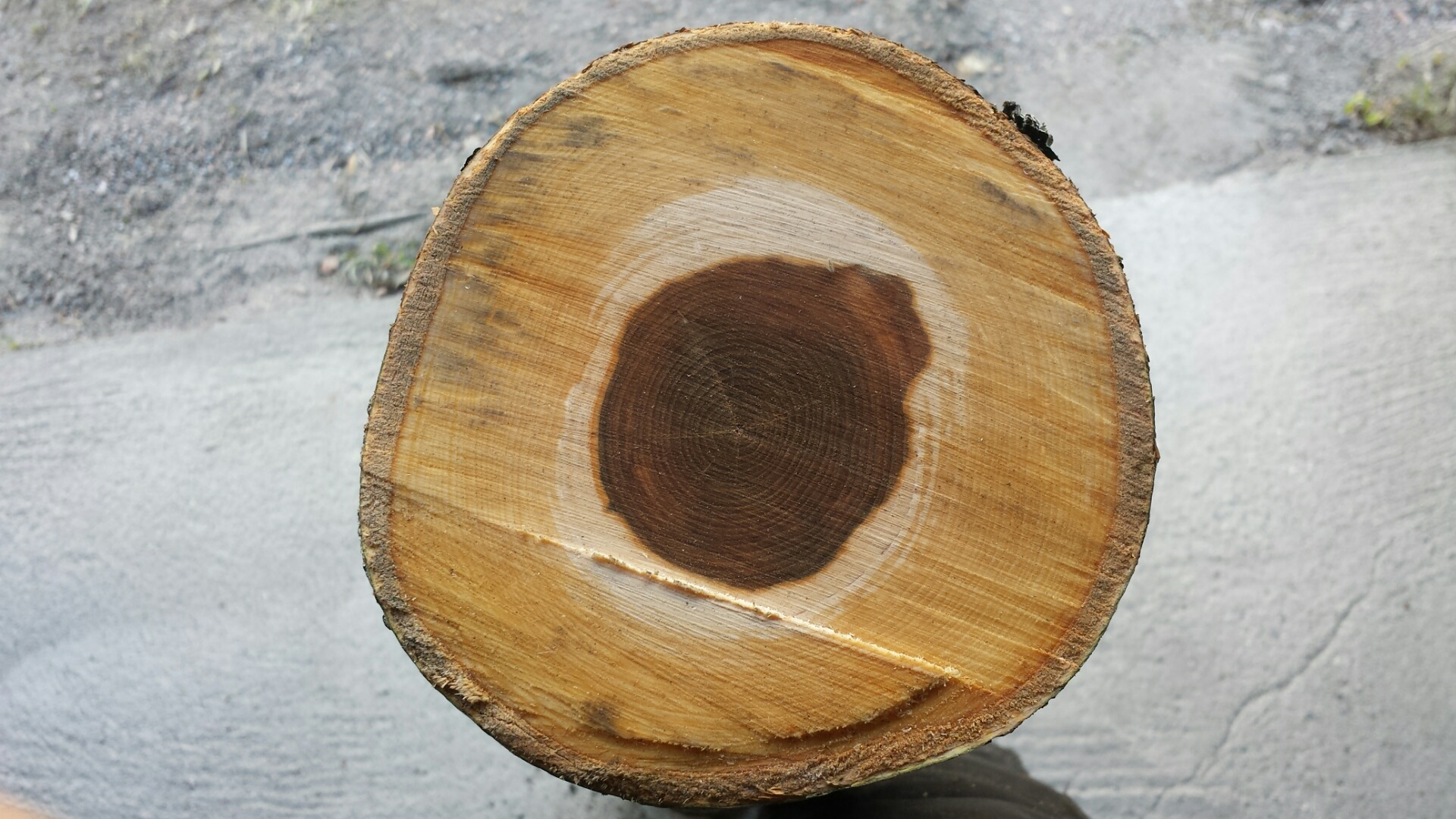
Freshly cross cut Sorbus aucuparia from the island of Engeløya in Norway with visible heartwood

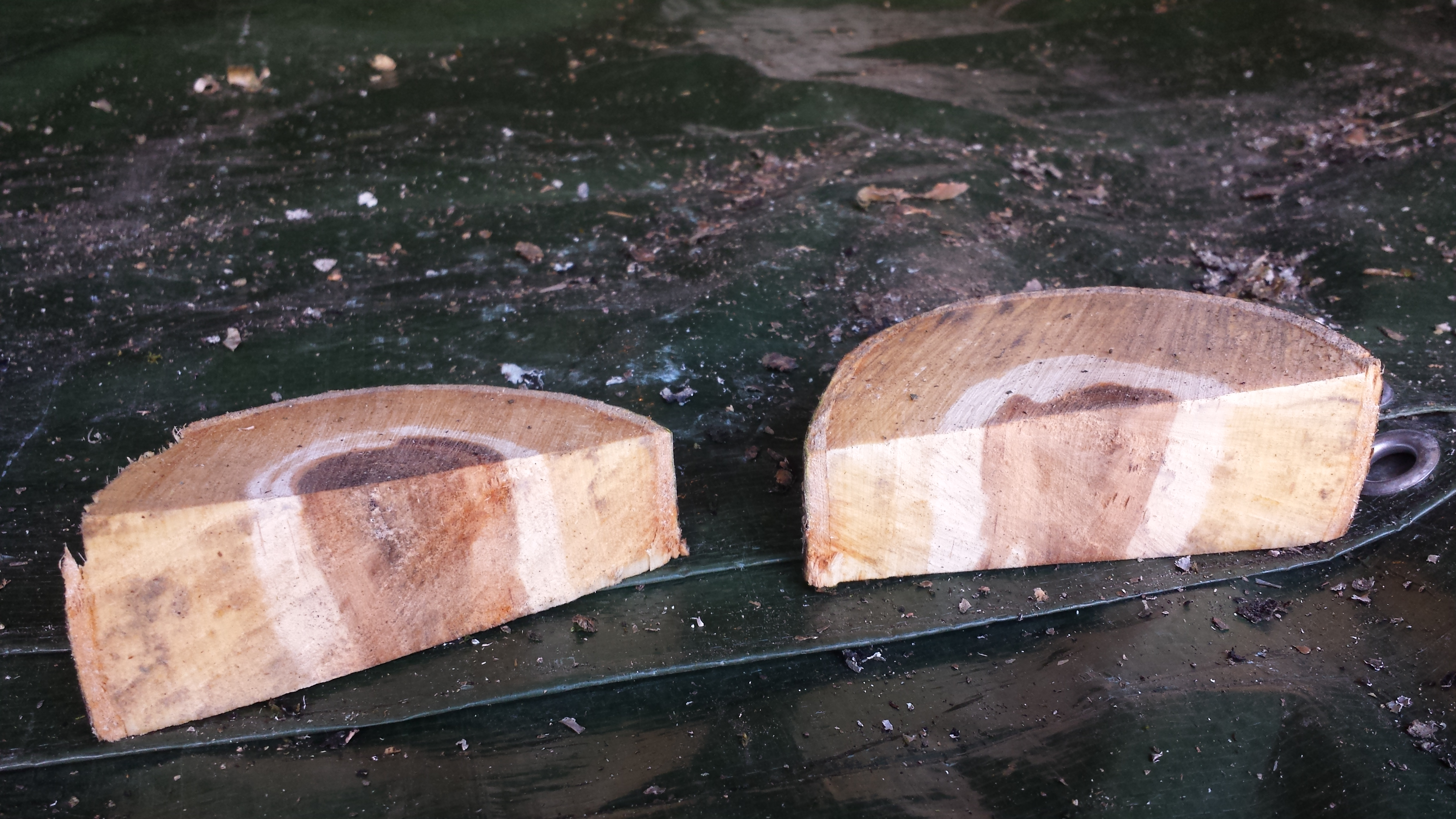
Freshly rip cut Sorbus aucuparia from the island of Engeløya in Norway

The fruit of the European rowan (Sorbus aucuparia) can be made into a slightly bitter jelly which in Britain is traditionally eaten as an accompaniment to game, and into jams and other preserves either on their own or with other fruit. The fruit can also be a substitute for coffee beans, and has many uses in alcoholic beverages: to flavour liqueurs and cordials, to produce country wine, and to flavour ale. In Austria a clear rowan schnapps is distilled which is called by its German name Vogelbeerschnaps, Czechs also make a rowan liquor called jeřabinka, the Polish Jarzębiak is rowan-flavoured vodka, and the Welsh used to make a rowan wine called diodgriafel.

Rowan cultivars with superior fruit for human food use are available but not common; mostly the fruits are gathered from wild trees growing on public lands.

Rowan fruit contains sorbic acid, and when raw also contains parasorbic acid (about 0.4%–0.7% in the European rowan), which causes indigestion and can lead to kidney damage, but heat treatment (cooking, heat-drying etc.) and, to a lesser extent, freezing, renders it nontoxic by changing it to the benign sorbic acid. They are also usually too astringent to be palatable when raw. Collecting them after first frost (or putting in the freezer) cuts down on the bitter taste as well.

== Mythology and folklore ==
=== Mythology ===
In Sami mythology, the goddess Ravdna is the consort of the thunder-god Horagalles. Red berries of rowan were holy to Ravdna, and the name Ravdna resembles North Germanic words for the tree (for example, Old Norse reynir).

In Norse mythology, the goddess Sif is the wife of the thunder god Thor, who has been linked with Ravdna. According to Skáldskaparmál the rowan is called "the salvation of Thor" because Thor once saved himself by clinging to it. It has been hypothesized that Sif was once conceived in the form of a rowan to which Thor clung.

In the Fianna Cycle of Irish mythology, The Pursuit of Diarmuid and Grainne sees the couple eloping, trying to escape the vengeance of the legendary leader Fionn Mac Cumhaill, whom Grainne had spurned. The pair came to a forest guarded by the giant Searbhán. Searbhán allowed the pair to rest and hunt in his forest, as long as they did not eat the berries of his magical rowan tree. The pregnant Grainne desired the berries, and Diarmuid was compelled to kill Searbhán to obtain them. His mortal weapons being powerless against Searbhán, he used the giant's own iron club to kill him. The pair climbed high into the rowan tree to eat the sweetest berries, then rested in the tree afterwards. This was in violation of the advice of Aengus, the god of love, who had warned the couple that they should "not sleep in a cave with one opening, or a house with one door, or a tree with one branch, and that they would never be able to eat where they cooked, or sleep where they ate." Fionn Mac Cuimhaill tracked the couple to the rowan tree and tricked Diarmuid into revealing himself through a game of chess. Aengus spirited Grainne away and Diarmuid leapt to safety, and the pursuit continued.

=== Folk magic ===
The European Rowan (Sorbus aucuparia) has a long tradition in European mythology and folklore. It was thought to be a magical tree and give protection against malevolent beings. The tree was also called "wayfarer's tree" or "traveller's tree" because it supposedly prevents those on a journey from getting lost. It was said in England that this was the tree on which the Devil hanged his mother.

British folklorists of the Victorian era reported the folk belief in apotropaic powers of the rowan-tree, in particular in the warding off of witches. Such a report is given by Edwin Lees (1856) for the Wyre Forest in the English West Midlands. Sir James Frazer (1890) reported such a tradition in Scotland, where the tree was often planted near a gate or front door.

According to Frazer, birds' droppings often contain rowan seeds, and if such droppings land in a fork or hole where old leaves have accumulated on a larger tree, such as an oak or a maple, they may result in a rowan growing as an epiphyte on the larger tree. Such a rowan is called a "flying rowan" and was thought of as especially potent against witches and black magic, and as a counter-charm against sorcery. In 1891, Charles Godfrey Leland also reported traditions of rowan's apotropaic powers against witches in English folklore, citing the Denham Tracts (collected between 1846 and 1859). (Note: "The anti-witch rhyme used in Tweedesdale some sixty or seventy years ago was: Black-luggie, lammer bead, rowan-tree and reed thread, put the witches to their speed. [...] I have seen a twig of rowan-tree [...] which had been gathered on the second of May (observe this), wound round with some dozens of yards of red thread, placed visible in the window to act as a charm in keeping witches and Boggle boes from the house." — C. G. Leland) Rowan also serves as protection against fairies. For example, according to Thomas Keightley mortals could safely witness fairy rades (mounted processions held by the fairies each year at the onset of summer) by placing a rowan branch over their doors.

=== Pagan revivalism ===
In Neo-Druidism, the rowan is known as the "portal tree". It is considered the threshold, between this world and otherworld, or between here and wherever one may be going, for example, it was placed at the gate to a property, signifying the crossing of the threshold between the path or street and the property of someone. According to Elen Sentier, "Threshold is a place of both ingress (the way in) and egress (the way out). Rowan is a portal, threshold tree offering you the chance of 'going somewhere ... and leaving somewhere."

=== Weather-lore ===
The rowan pictured in the former coat of arms of Pihlajavesi

In Newfoundland, popular folklore maintains that a heavy crop of fruit means a hard or difficult winter. Similarly, in Finland and Sweden, the number of fruit on the trees was used as a predictor of the snow cover during winter, but here the belief was that the rowan "will not bear a heavy load of fruit and a heavy load of snow in the same year", that is, a heavy fruit crop predicted a winter with little snow.

However, as fruit production for a given summer is related to weather conditions the previous summer, with warm, dry summers increasing the amount of stored sugars available for subsequent flower and fruit production, it has no predictive relationship to the weather of the next winter.

In Malax, Finland, the reverse was thought. If the rowan flowers were plentiful then the rye harvest would also be plentiful. Similarly, if the rowan flowered twice in a year there would be many potatoes and many weddings that autumn. And in Sipoo people are noted as having said that winter had begun when the waxwings (Bombycilla garrulus) had eaten the last of the rowan fruit.

In Sweden, it was also thought that if the rowan trees grew pale and lost colour, the autumn and winter would bring much illness.

=== Popular culture ===
References to the rowan fruit's red color and the flowers' beauty are common in Celtic music. For example, the song "Marie's Wedding" contains the verse

Red her cheeks as rowans are, bright her eyes as any star, fairest of them all by far, is our darling Marie.

J. R. R. Tolkien's novel The Two Towers employs rowans as the signature tree for the Ent, Quickbeam. The forest of Fangorn, where Quickbeam and other Ents live, is populated with numerous rowans that were said to have been planted by male Ents to please the female Entwives. Quickbeam declares his fondness for the tree by saying that no other "people of the Rose ... are so beautiful to me," a reference to the rowan's membership in the family Rosaceae.

== See also ==
- Rowntree, an English surname derived from "rowan tree"
- Genus Aria (formerly considered as a subgenus in the genus Sorbus)
- Genus Micromeles (formerly considered as a subgenus in the genus Sorbus)
- Genus Cormus (formerly considered as a subgenus in the genus Sorbus)
- Genus Torminalis (formerly considered as a subgenus in the genus Sorbus)
- Genus Chamaemespilus (formerly considered as a subgenus in the genus Sorbus)
