= Pyrus hupehensis =

Pyrus hupehensis may refer to two different species of plants:

- Pyrus hupehensis Pamp., a synonym for Malus hupehensis, the Chinese crab apple
- Pyrus hupehensis (C.K.Schneid.) Bean, a synonym for Sorbus hupehensis, the Hupeh rowan
