= Sorbic acid =

Food preservative - (CH3(CH)4COOH)

- Sorbic acid

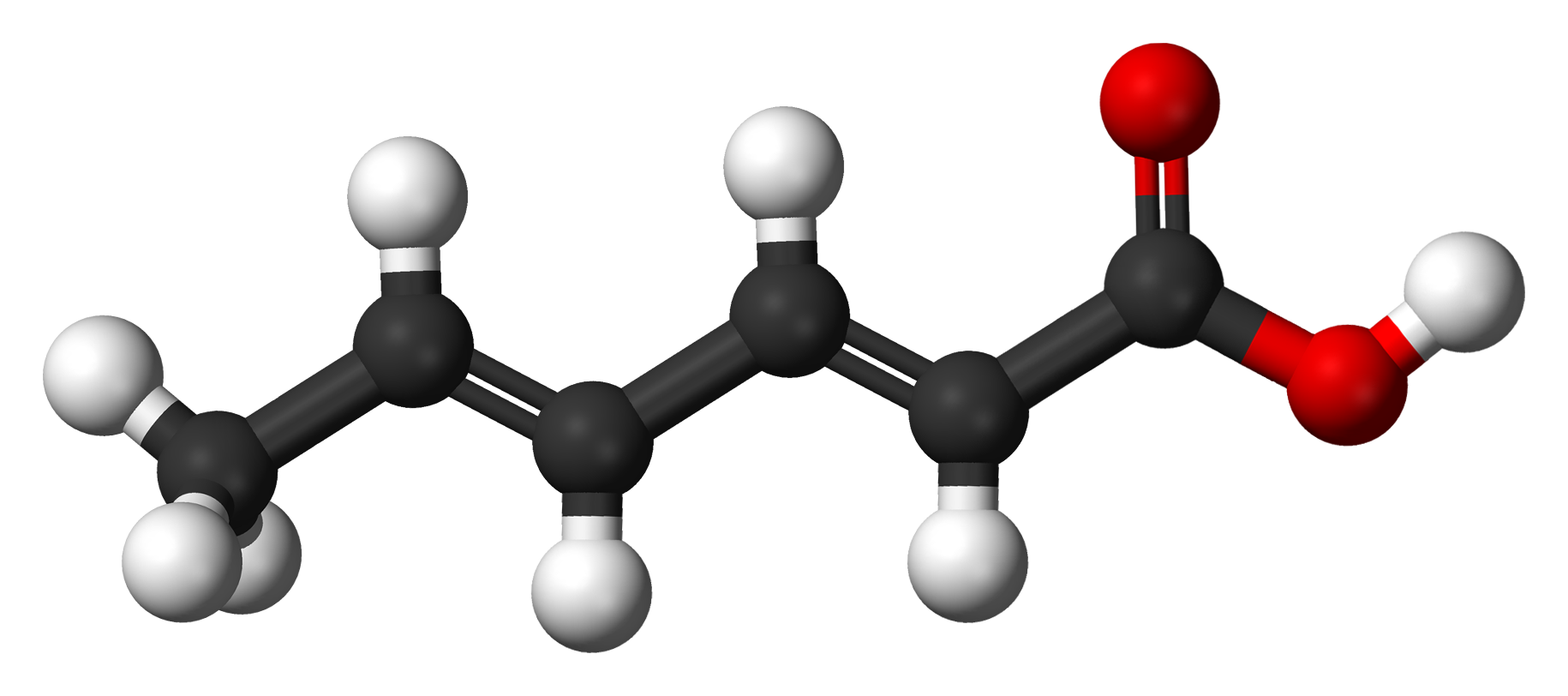
- Sorbic acid (ball-and-stick model)

Names
- Preferred IUPAC name (2E,4E)-Hexa-2,4-dienoic acid

Identifiers
CAS Number	110-44-1
3D model (JSmol)	Interactive image
ChEBI	CHEBI:38358
ChEMBL	ChEMBL250212
ChemSpider	558605
ECHA InfoCard	100.003.427
E number	E200 (preservatives)
PubChem CID	643460
UNII	X045WJ989B
CompTox Dashboard (EPA)	DTXSID3021277
- InChI: InChI=1S/C6H8O2/c1-2-3-4-5-6(7)8/h2-5H,1H3,(H,7,8)/b3-2+,5-4+ Key: WSWCOQWTEOXDQX-MQQKCMAXSA-N; InChI=1/C6H8O2/c1-2-3-4-5-6(7)8/h2-5H,1H3,(H,7,8)/b3-2+,5-4+ Key: WSWCOQWTEOXDQX-MQQKCMAXBN
- SMILES: O=C(O)\C=C\C=C\C

Properties
Chemical formula	C_{6}H_{8}O_{2}
Molar mass	112.128 g·mol^{−1}
Density	1.204 g/cm^{3}
Melting point	135 °C (275 °F; 408 K)
Boiling point	228 °C (442 °F; 501 K)
Solubility in water	1.6 g/L at 20 °C
Acidity (pK_{a})	4.76 at 25 °C

Hazards
NFPA 704 (fire diamond)	2 1 0
- Except where otherwise noted, data are given for materials in their standard state (at 25 °C [77 °F], 100 kPa). verify (what is ?) Infobox references

Sorbic acid, or 2,4-hexadienoic acid, is a natural organic compound used as a food preservative. It has the chemical formula CH_{3}(CH)_{4}CO_{2}H and the structure H_{3}C−CH=CH−CH=CH−C(=O)OH. It is a colourless solid that is slightly soluble in water and sublimes readily. It was first isolated from the unripe berries of the Sorbus aucuparia (rowan tree), hence its name.

== Production ==
The traditional route to sorbic acid involves condensation of malonic acid and crotonaldehyde. It can also be prepared from isomeric hexadienoic acids, which are available via a nickel-catalyzed reaction of allyl chloride, acetylene, and carbon monoxide. The route used commercially, however, is from crotonaldehyde and ketene. An estimated 30,000 tonnes are produced annually.

== History ==
Sorbic acid was isolated in 1859 by distillation of rowan berry oil by A. W. von Hofmann. This affords parasorbic acid, the lactone of sorbic acid, which he converted to sorbic acid by hydrolysis. Its antimicrobial activities were discovered in the late 1930s and 1940s, and it became commercially available in the late 1940s and 1950s. Beginning in the 1980s, sorbic acid and its salts were used as inhibitors of Clostridium botulinum in meat products to replace the use of nitrites, which can produce carcinogenic nitrosamines.

== Properties and uses ==
With a pK_{a} of 4.76, sorbic acid is about as acidic as acetic acid.

Sorbic acid and its salts, especially potassium sorbate and calcium sorbate, are antimicrobial agents often used as preservatives in food and drinks to prevent the growth of mold, yeast, and fungi. In general the salts are preferred over the acid form because they are more soluble in water, but the active form is the acid. The optimal pH for the antimicrobial activity is below pH 6.5. Sorbates are generally used at concentrations of 0.025% to 0.10%. Adding sorbate salts to food will, however, raise the pH of the food slightly so the pH may need to be adjusted to assure safety. It is found in foods such as various kinds of cheese, bread, muffins, donuts, pies, cookies, protein bars, syrups, lemonades, fruit juices, dried meats, sausages, nuggets, burgers, sandwiches, tacos, pizzas, smoked fish, margarine, sauces, soups, and more.

The E numbers are:

- E200 Sorbic acid
- E201 Sodium sorbate
- E202 Potassium sorbate
- E203 Calcium sorbate

Some molds (notably some Trichoderma and Penicillium strains) and yeasts are able to detoxify sorbates by decarboxylation, producing trans-1,3-pentadiene. The pentadiene manifests as a typical odor of kerosene or petroleum. Other detoxification reactions include reduction to 4-hexenol and 4-hexenoic acid.

Sorbic acid can also be used as an additive for cold rubber, and as an intermediate in the manufacture of some plasticizers and lubricants.

== Safety ==
Sorbic acid and sorbate salts have a very low mammalian toxicity and carcinogenicity. Its LD_{50} is estimated to be between 7.4 and 10 g/kg.

== See also ==
- Acids in wine
- Parasorbic acid
