= Sodium sorbate =

Chemical compound

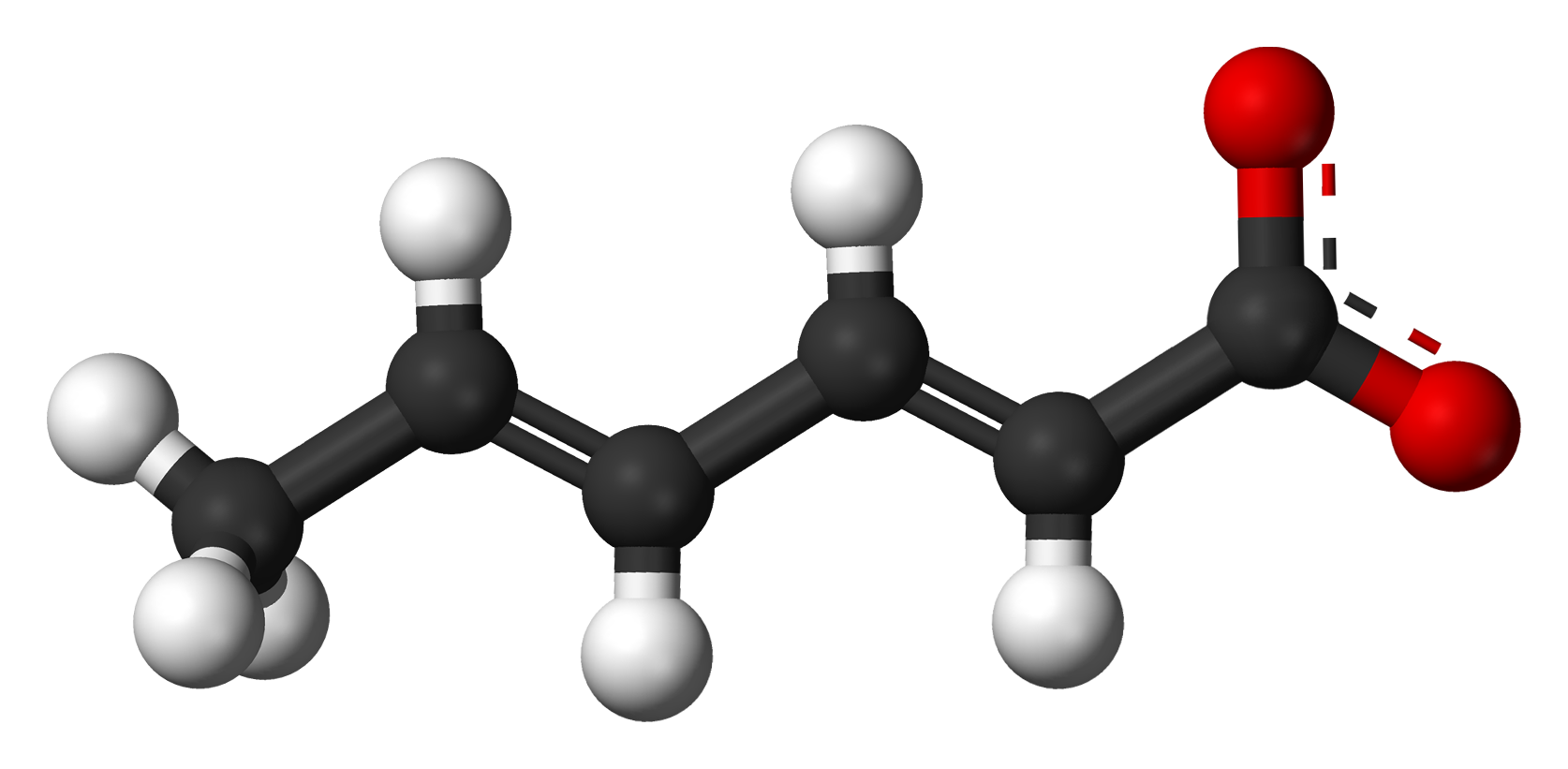

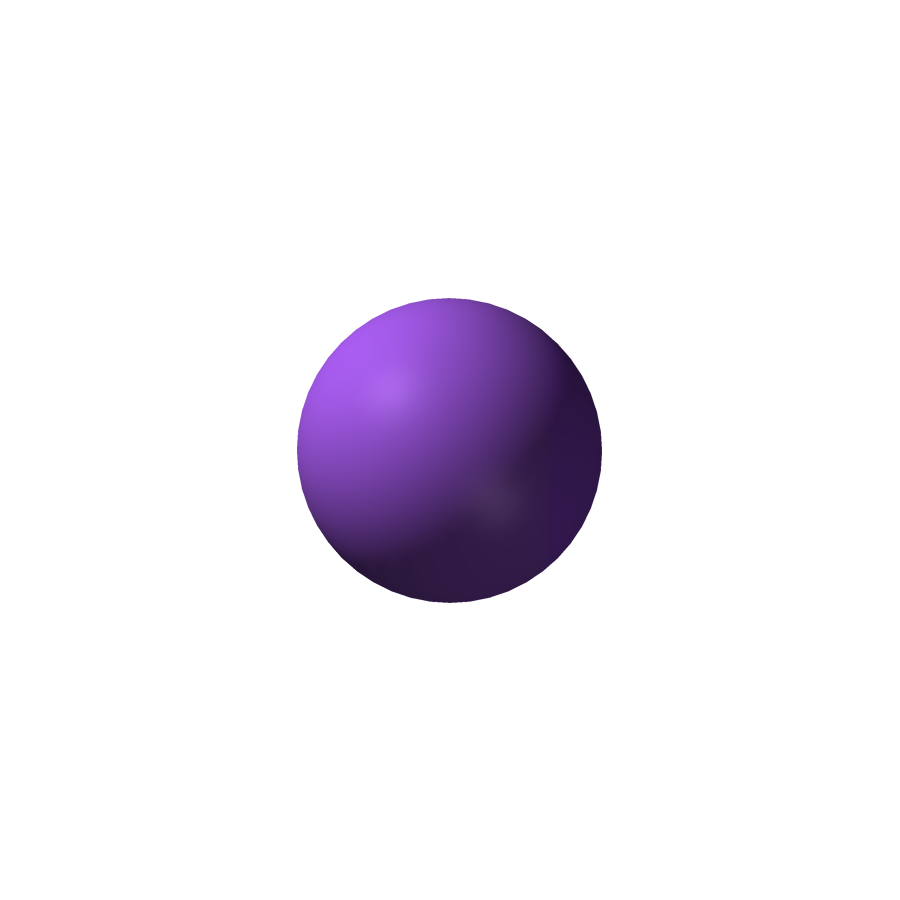
The sodium cation

Names
- Preferred IUPAC name Sodium (2E,4E)-hexa-2,4-dienoate

Identifiers
CAS Number	7757-81-5
3D model (JSmol)	Interactive image
ChemSpider	4938659
ECHA InfoCard	100.028.927
E number	E201 (preservatives)
PubChem CID	23665582
UNII	TGW6Q2CCVM
CompTox Dashboard (EPA)	DTXSID8047181
- InChI: InChI=1S/C6H8O2.Na/c1-2-3-4-5-6(7)8;/h2-5H,1H3,(H,7,8);/q;+1/p-1/b3-2+,5-4+; Key: LROWVYNUWKVTCU-STWYSWDKSA-M; InChI=1/C6H8O2.Na/c1-2-3-4-5-6(7)8;/h2-5H,1H3,(H,7,8);/q;+1/p-1/b3-2+,5-4+; Key: LROWVYNUWKVTCU-ZCSOUONQBK
- SMILES: [Na+].[O-]C(=O)\C=C\C=C\C

Properties
Chemical formula	C_{6}H_{7}NaO_{2}
Molar mass	134.10835 g/mol
Odor	hydrocarbon-like
Boiling point	233 °C (451 °F; 506 K)
- Except where otherwise noted, data are given for materials in their standard state (at 25 °C [77 °F], 100 kPa). verify (what is ?) Infobox references

Sodium sorbate is the sodium salt of sorbic acid. It is an unstable white solid. Unlike other sorbic acid salts such as potassium sorbate (E202) and calcium sorbate (E203), the use of sodium sorbate as a food additive is prohibited in the EU due to potentially genotoxic effects.

Its E-number is E201.
