= E201 =

E201 or E-201 may be:

- Sodium sorbate, a food preservative
- European route E201, a European route which traverses only Ireland, where it is identical to the N8 road (Ireland)
