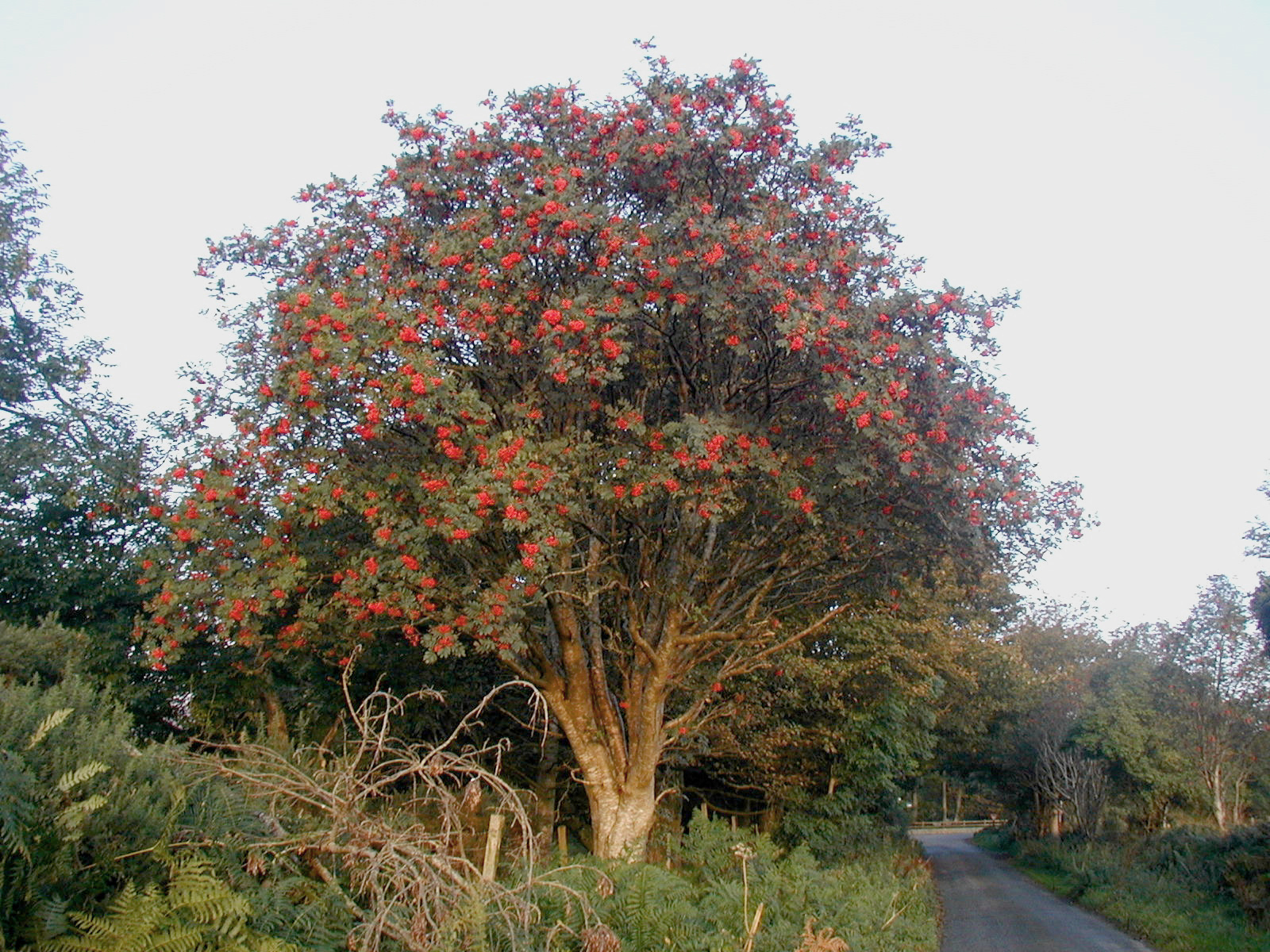
- A roadside tree with berries in Ireland

Conservation status
- Least Concern (IUCN 3.1)

Scientific classification
- Kingdom: Plantae
- Clade: Tracheophytes
- Clade: Angiosperms
- Clade: Eudicots
- Clade: Rosids
- Order: Rosales
- Family: Rosaceae
- Genus: Sorbus
- Species: S. aucuparia

Binomial name
- Sorbus aucuparia L.
- Distribution map

Synonyms
- List: Aucuparia pinnata Fourr.; Aucuparia silvestris Medik.; Crataegus aucuparia (L.) Salisb.; Mespilus aucuparia (L.) Scop.; Pyrenia aucuparia (L.) Clairv.; Pyrus altaica (Koehne) M.F.Fay & Christenh.; Pyrus anadyrensis (Kom.) M.F.Fay & Christenh.; Pyrus aucuparia (L.) Gaertn.; Pyrus boissieri (C.K.Schneid.) M.F.Fay & Christenh.; Pyrus camschatcensis (Kom.) M.F.Fay & Christenh.; Pyrus lanuginosa (Kit.) DC.; Sorbus altaica Koehne; Sorbus anadyrensis Kom.; Sorbus aucuparia f. flavescentimarginata Jalas; Sorbus aucuparia var. hortorum P.D.Sell; Sorbus bachmarensis Gatsch.; Sorbus boissieri C.K.Schneid.; Sorbus boissieri f. apicidenticulata Gatsch.; Sorbus caucasigena Kom. ex Gatsch.; Sorbus caucasigena f. longifoliolata Gatsch.; Sorbus caucasigena f. subintegerrima Gatsch.; Sorbus caucasigena f. terminalidenticulata Gatsch.; Sorbus caucasigena f. versicolor Gatsch.; Sorbus cordata Gand.; Sorbus lanuginosa Kit.; Sorbus monticola Gand.; Sorbus sibirica (Hedl.) Prain; Sorbus subserrata Opiz

= Sorbus aucuparia =

Species of flowering plant in the rose family

Sorbus aucuparia, commonly called rowan (/ˈroʊən/, also UK: /ˈraʊən/) and mountain-ash, is a species of deciduous tree or shrub in the rose family.

The tree has a slender trunk with smooth bark, a loose and roundish crown, and its leaves are pinnate in pairs of leaflets on a central vein with a terminal leaflet. It flowers from May to June in dense corymbs of small creamy-white flowers and develops small red pomes as fruit that ripen from August to October and are eaten by many bird species.

It is a highly variable species, and botanists have used different definitions of the species to include or exclude trees native to certain areas. A recent definition includes trees native to most of Europe and parts of Asia, as well as northern Africa. The range extends from Madeira, the British Isles and Iceland to Russia and northern China. Unlike many plants with similar distributions, it is not native to Japan. The plant is frost hardy and colonises disrupted and inaccessible places as a short-lived pioneer species.

The fruit and foliage have been used in the creation of dishes and beverages, as a folk medicine, and as fodder for livestock. Its tough and flexible wood has traditionally been used for woodworking. It is planted to fortify soil in mountain regions or as an ornamental tree and has several cultivars.

== Description ==
Sorbus aucuparia is a small tree or shrub that typically grows to between about 5 and 15 m (15 and 50 ft) in height, occasionally to 20 m (66 ft), and exceptionally to 28 m (92 ft). The crown is loose and roundish or irregularly shaped but wide and the plant often grows multiple trunks. A trunk is slender and cylindrical and reaches up to 40 cm (15 1/2 inches) in diameter, and the branches stick out and are slanted upwards. The bark of a young plant is yellowish grey and gleaming and becomes grey-black with lengthwise cracks in advanced age; it descales in small flakes. Lenticels in the bark are elongated and coloured a bright ochre. The plant does not often grow older than 80 years in warmer regions and is one of the shortest-lived trees in temperate climate, but can occasionally live longer, to 150 years. The wood has a wide reddish white sapwood and a light brown to reddish brown heartwood. It is diffuse-porous, flexible, elastic, and tough, but not durable, with a density of 600 to 700 kg/m^{3} (1,000 to 1,200 pounds per cubic yard) in a dried state. The roots grow wide and deep, and the plant is capable of root sprouting and can regenerate after coppicing.

The compound leaves are pinnate with four to nine pairs of leaflets on either side of a terete central vein and with a terminal leaflet. The leaves are up to 20 cm (8 in) long, 8 to 12 cm (3 to 4 1/2 in) wide. They have paired leaf-like stipules at the base of the petiole, and are arranged alternately along a branch, distinguishing them from those of ash, Fraxinus excelsior, which are opposite and without stipules. The leaflets are elongated-lanceolate in shape, 2 to 6 cm (3/4 to 2 1/4 in) long, and 1 to 2.5 cm (1/2 to 1 in) wide with a sharply serrated edge, and have short stems or sit close to the central vein except for the outermost leaflet. The leaflets are covered in grey-silvery hairs after sprouting but become mostly bare after they unfold. Their upper side is dark green and their underside is a greyish green and thinly hairy. Young leaflets smell like marzipan when brayed. The leaflets are asymmetrical at the bottom. The foliage grows in May and turns yellow in autumn or a dark red in dry locations.

The buds are often longer than 1 cm (3/8 in) and have flossy to felted hairs. These hairs, which disappear over time, cover dark brown to black bud scales. The terminal buds are oval and pointed and larger than axillary buds, which are narrow, oval and pointed, close to the twig, and often curved towards it.

The species is monoecious. It reaches maturity at age 10 and carries ample fruit almost every year. The plant flowers from May to June (on occasion again in September) in many yellowish white corymbs that contain about 250 flowers. The corymbs are large, upright, and bulging. The flowers are between 8 and 10 mm (3/8 and 3/8 inch) in diameter and have five small, yellowish green, and triangular sepals that are covered in hairs or bare. The five round or oval petals are yellowish white and the flower has up to 25 stamens fused with the corolla to form a hypanthium and an ovary with two to five styles; the style is fused with the receptacle. The flowers have an unpleasant trimethylamine smell. Their nectar is high in fructose and glucose.

Its berries are round pomes between 8 and 10 mm (5/16 and 3/8 inch) in diameter that ripen from August to October. The fruit are green before they ripen and then typically turn to orange or scarlet when ripe. The sepals persist as a black, five-pointed star on the ripe fruit. A corymb carries 80 to 100 pomes. A pome contains a star-shaped ovary with two to five locules each containing one or two flat, narrow, and pointed reddish seeds. The flesh of the fruit contains carotenoids, citric acid, malic acid, parasorbic acid, pectin, provitamin A, sorbitol, tannin, and vitamin C. The seeds contain glycoside. Its fruit persists for an average of 100.6 days, and bears an average of 2.5 seeds per fruit. Fruits average 73.0% water, and their dry weight includes 8.9% carbohydrates and 3.1% lipids.

The species has a chromosome number of 2n=34.

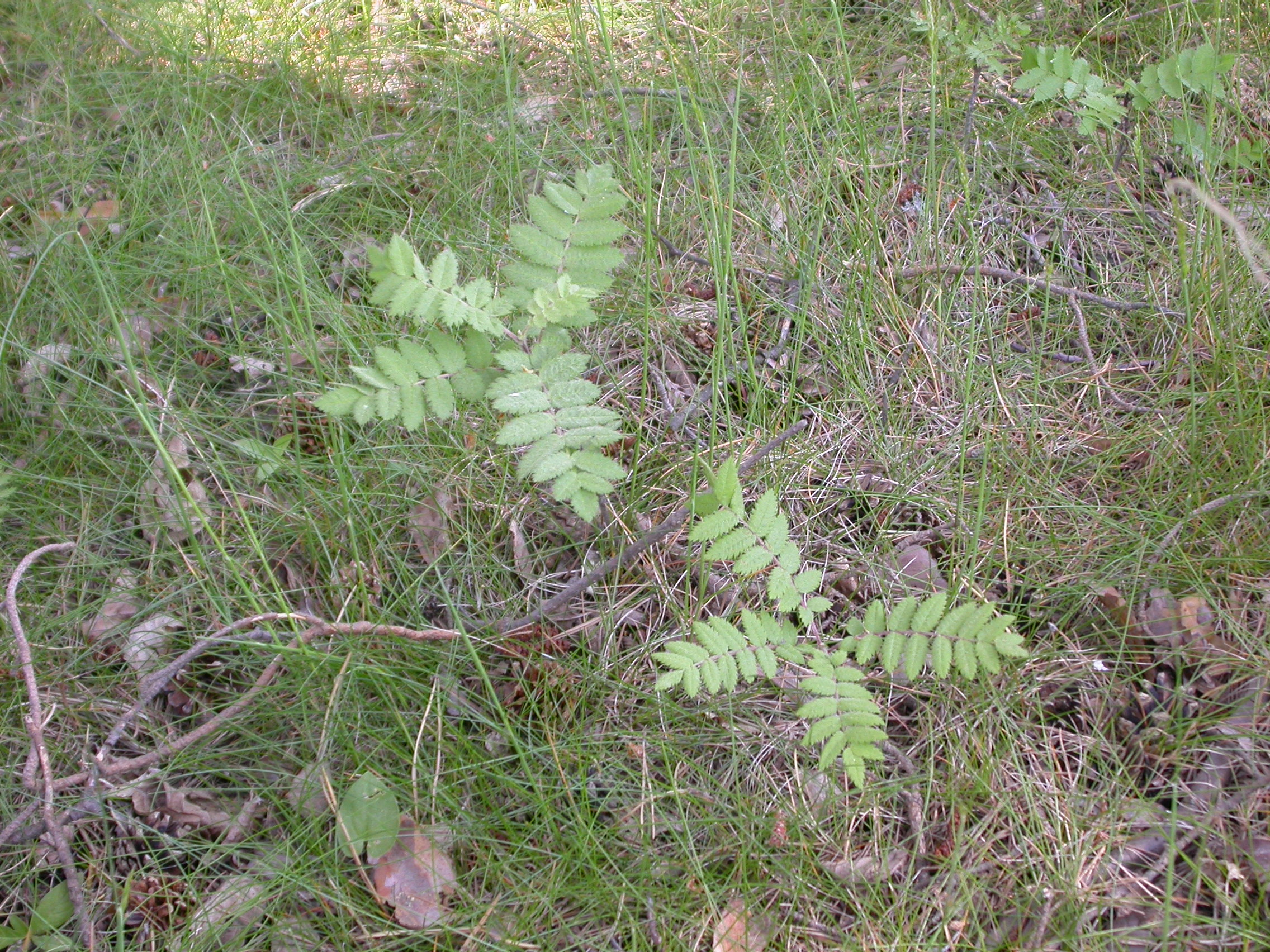
Saplings showing the typical leaf form

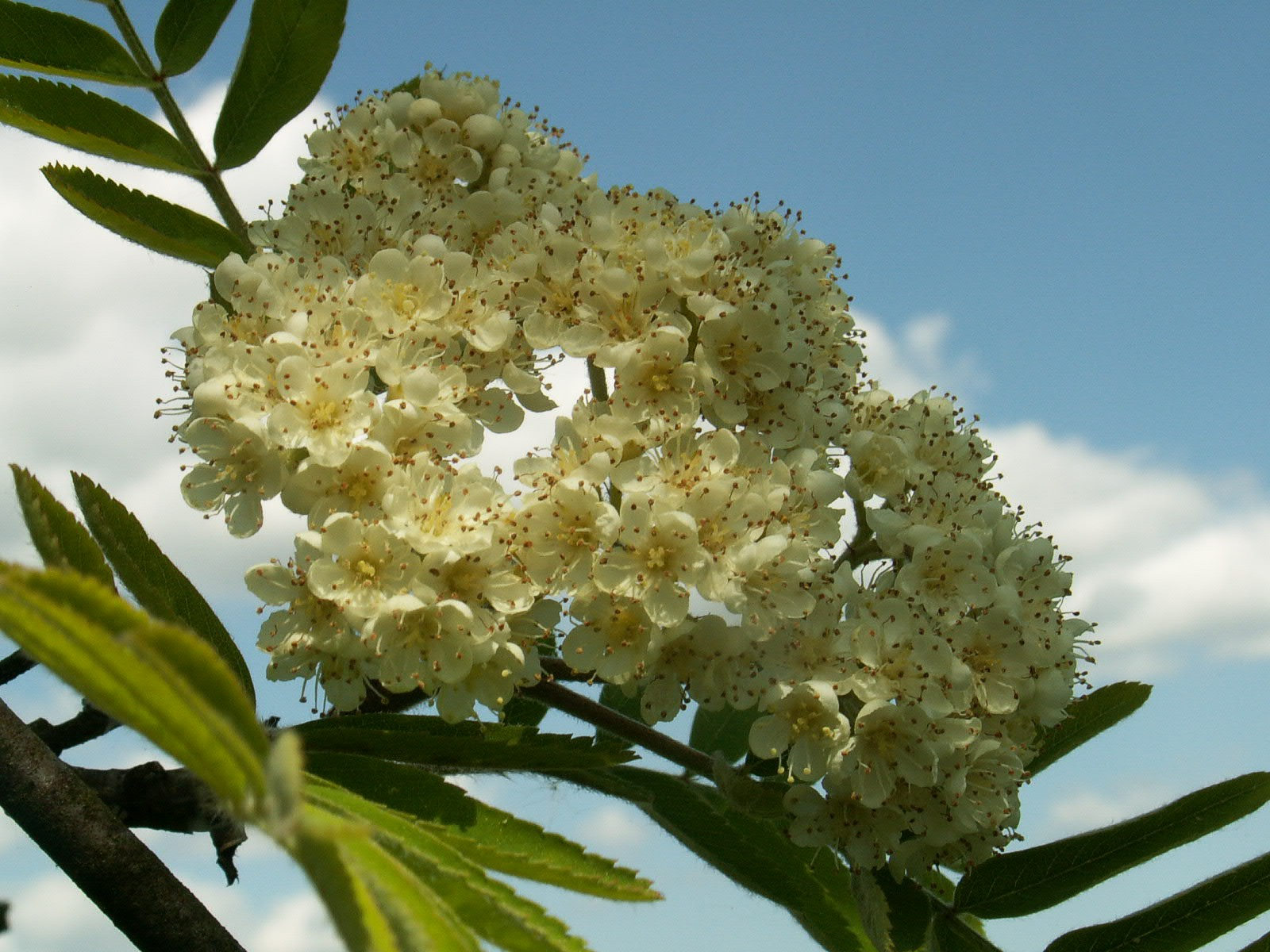
Inflorescence

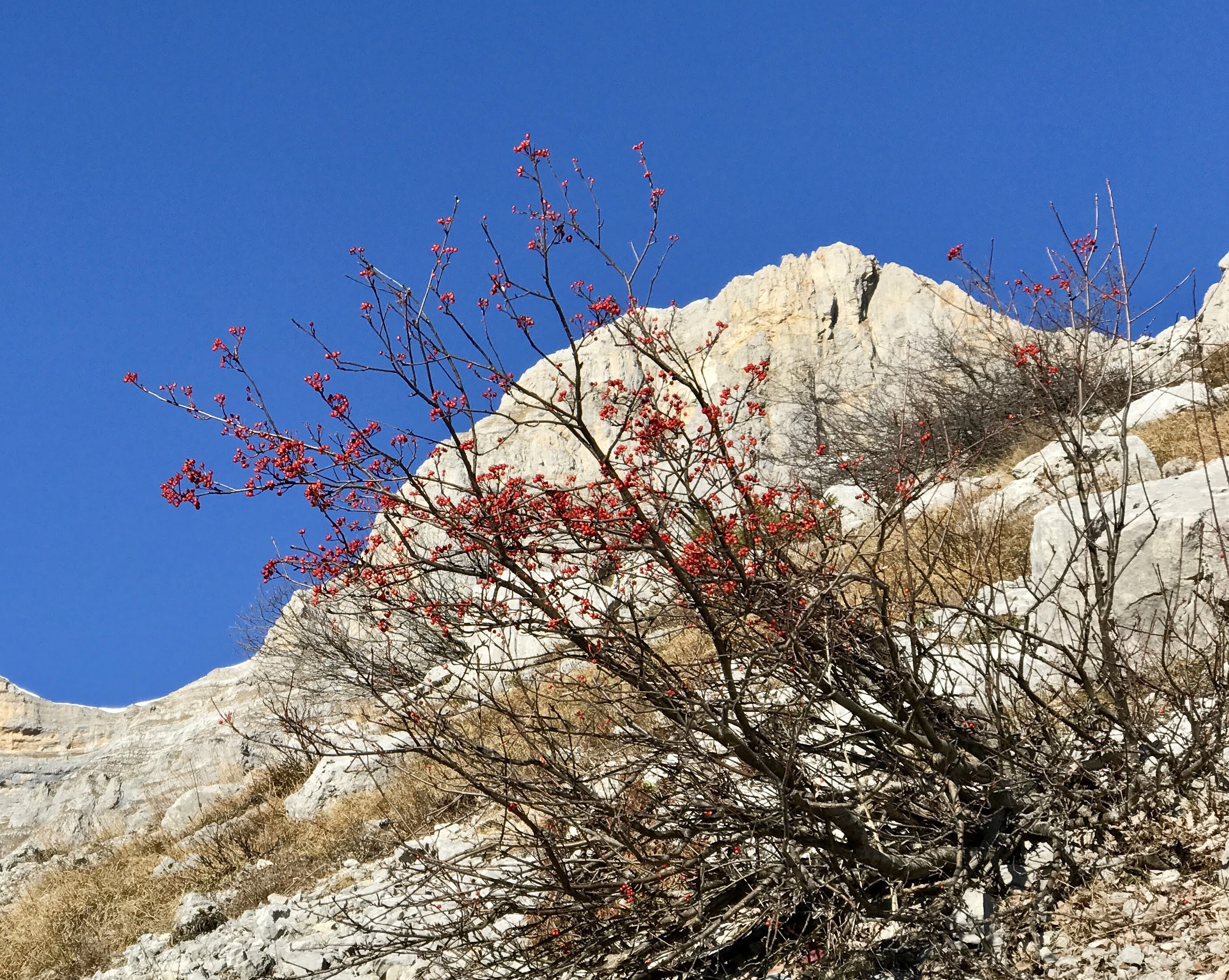
Specimen in the Vercors range holding its fruit through late autumn

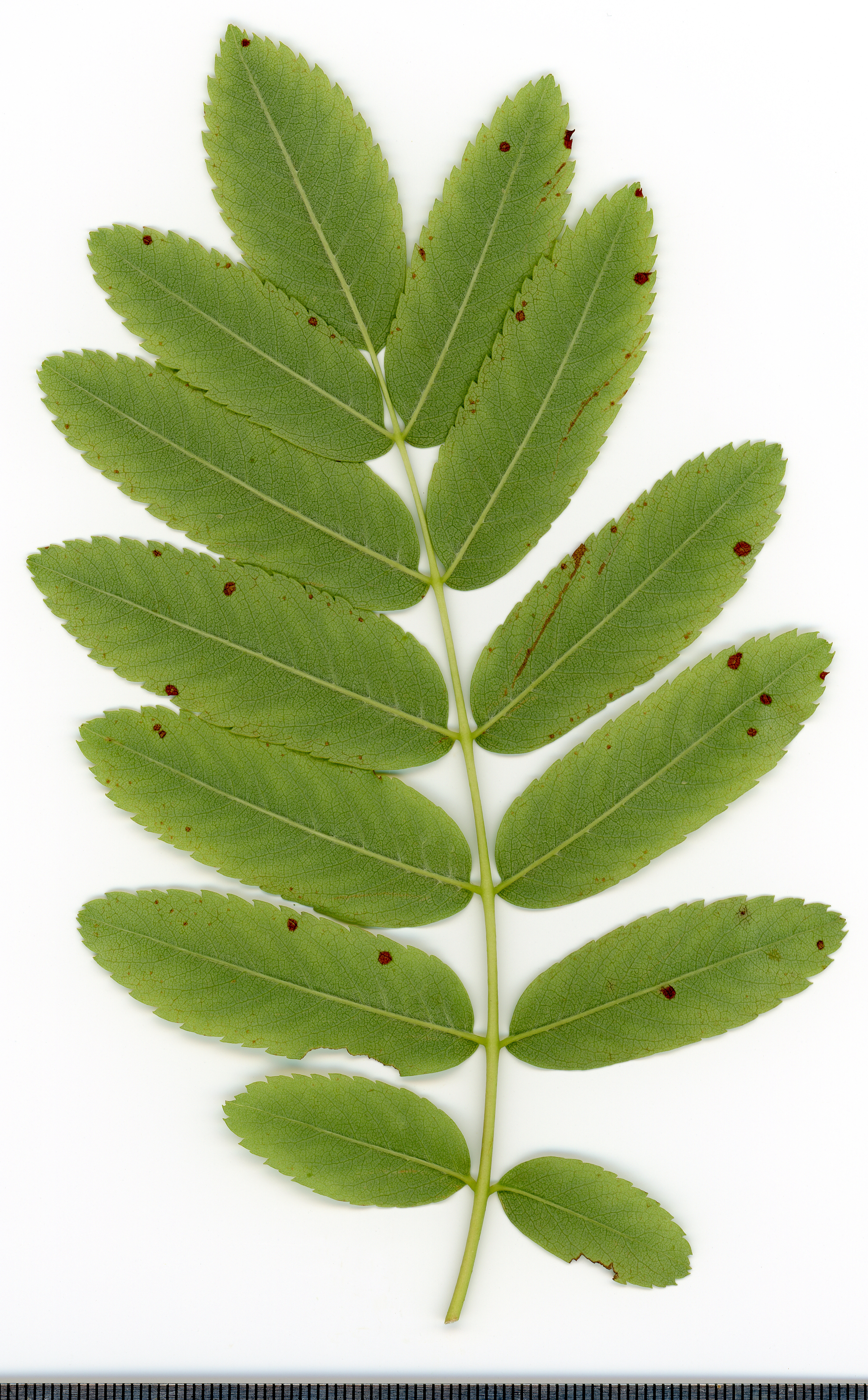
Leaf structure

== Taxonomy ==
=== Fossil record ===
Fossils of Sorbus aucuparia have been described from the fossil flora of Kızılcahamam district in Turkey, which is of early Pliocene age.

=== Names ===
The binomial name Sorbus aucuparia is composed of the Latin words sorbus for service tree and aucuparia, which derives from the words avis for "bird" and capere for "catching" and describes the use of the fruit of S. aucuparia as bait for fowling. The plant is most commonly known as rowan, and has also been called European rowan, mountain-ash, European mountain-ash, quick beam, quickbeam, or rowan-berry. The names rowan and mountain ash may be applied to other species in Sorbus subgenus Sorbus, and mountain ash may be used for several other distantly related trees. The species is not closely related to either the true ash trees (genus Fraxinus), which also carry pinnate leaves, or the species Eucalyptus regnans, also called mountain ash, native to Tasmania and Victoria in southeastern Australia.

The common name mountain ash dates from the 16th century. It was first used by John Gerard in 1597, translating it directly from the then botanists' Latin Montana fraxinus

S. aucuparia was previously classified as Pyrus aucuparia.

== Distribution and habitat ==
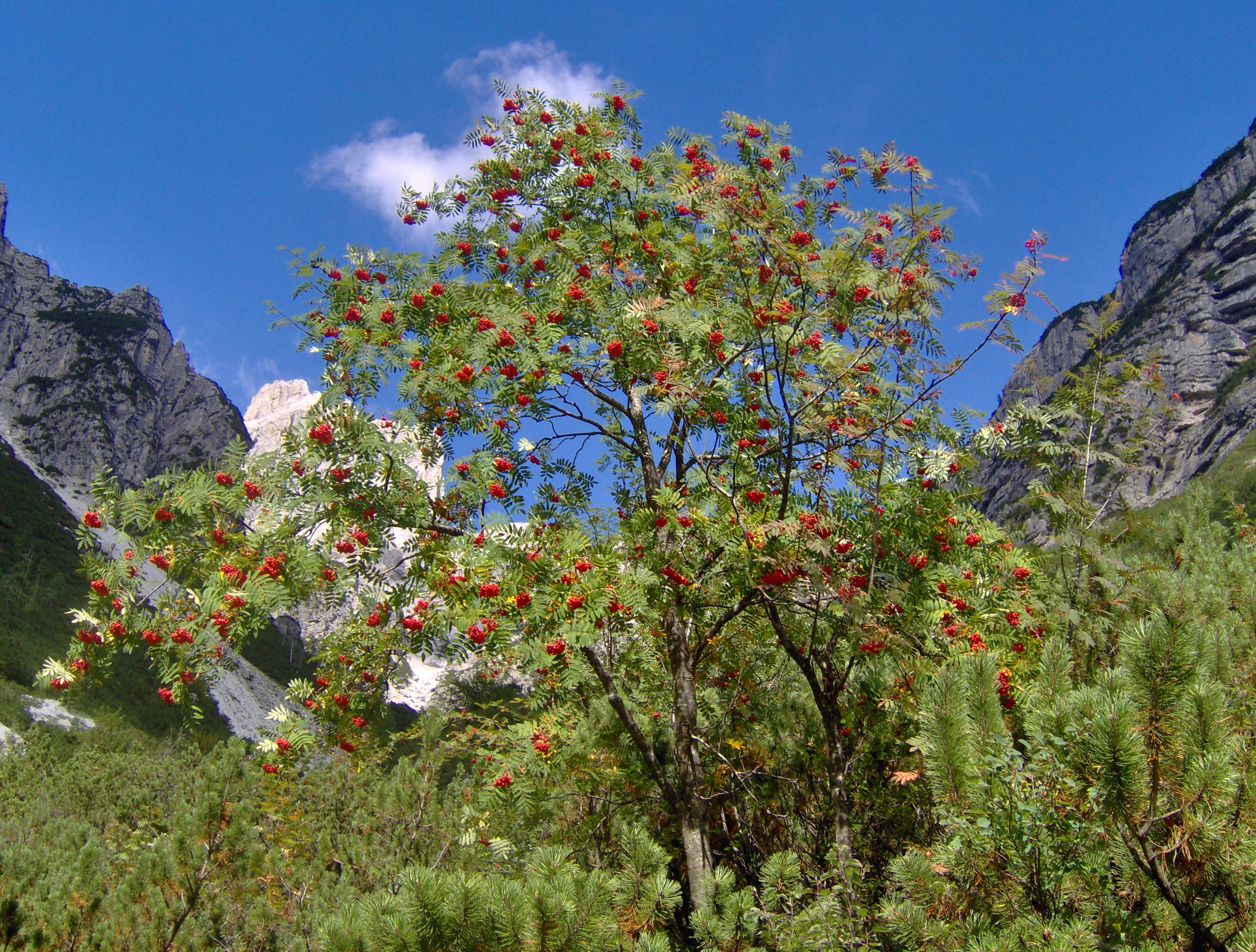
Growing with mountain pine in the Italian Alps

Sorbus aucuparia is found in five subspecies:

- Sorbus aucuparia subsp. aucuparia: found in most of the species' range, less in the South
- Sorbus aucuparia subsp. fenenkiana (Georgiev & Stoj.): has thin, sparsely hairy leaflets and depressed-globose fruit, restricted to Bulgaria
- Sorbus aucuparia subsp. glabrata (Wimm. & Grab.): less hairy, found in Northern Europe and Central European mountains
- Sorbus aucuparia subsp. praemorsa (Guss.): has hairy leaflets and ovoid fruit, found in Southern Italy, Sicily, and Corsica
- Sorbus aucuparia subsp. sibirica (Hedl.): nearly hairless, found in North Eastern Russia

It can be found in almost all of Europe and the Caucasus up to Northern Russia and Siberia, but it is not native to Southern Spain, Southern Greece, Sardinia, the Balearic Islands, the Azores, and the Faroe Islands. The species was introduced as an ornamental species in North America. It is widespread from plains to mountains up to the tree line where it grows as the only deciduous tree species among krummholz. In the Alps it grows at elevations of up to 2,000 m (6,600 ft). S. aucuparia appears north of the boreal forest at the arctic tree line; in Norway, it is found up to the 71st parallel north. It has naturalised in America from Washington to Alaska and eastward in Canada and the northeast of the US very successfully.

S. aucuparia is an undemanding species and can withstand shade. It is frost hardy and can tolerate winter dryness and a brief growing season. The plant is also resistant to air pollution, wind, and snow pressure. It mostly grows on soil that is moderately dry to moderately damp, acidic, low on nutrients, sandy, and loose. It often grows in stony soil or clay soil, but also sandy soil or wet peat. The plant grows best on fresh, loose, and fertile soil, prefers average humidity, and does not tolerate saline soil or waterlogging. It can be found in light woodland of all kinds and as a pioneer species over fallen dead trees or in clearcuttings, and at the edge of forests or at the sides of roads. The seeds germinate easily, so the plant may appear on inaccessible rock, ruins, branch forks, or on hollow trees.

The tallest S. aucuparia in the United Kingdom stands in the Chiltern Hills in South East England. This exceptional specimen is 28 m (92 ft) tall and has a trunk diameter of 56 cm (22 in). The stoutest is in the Scottish Highlands near Kingussie, with a girth of 4.31 m (approximately 1.37 m diameter); another near Stapleton in Herefordshire is almost as stout at 4.29 m girth. In Germany, an unusually large specimen is located near Wendisch Waren, a village in Mecklenburg-Vorpommern. This tree stands at more than 15 m (49 ft) tall, is around 100 years old, and has a diameter of 70 cm (28 in). The tallest known specimen in Ireland is an 18 m (59 ft) tall specimen at Glenstal Abbey, County Limerick.

== Ecology ==
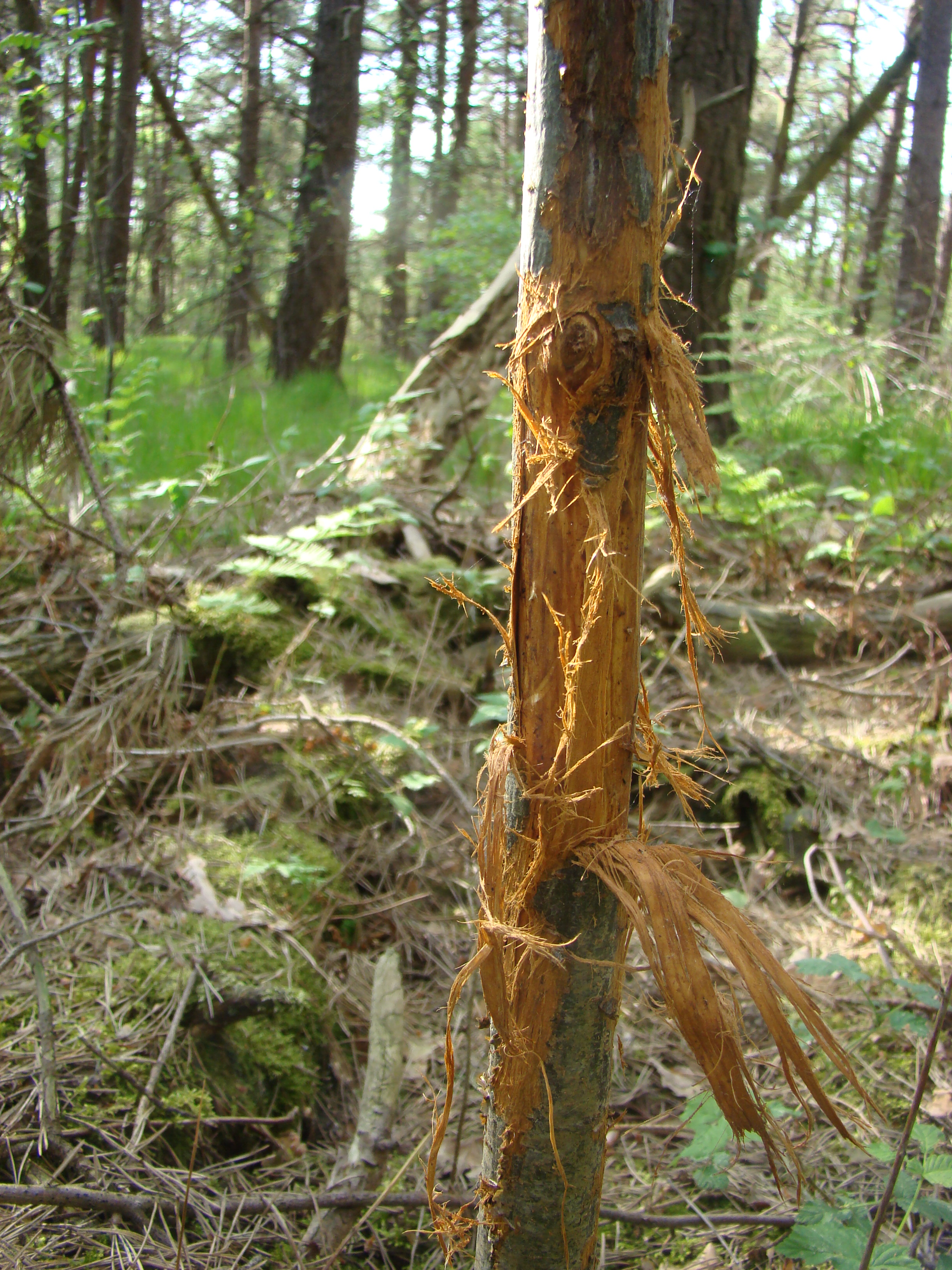
Damage caused by deer

The species is pollinated by bees and flies. Its seeds are not digested by birds and are thus propagated by being passed intact in their droppings. The fruit are eaten by about 60 bird species and several mammals. They are liked particularly by thrushes and other songbirds, and are also eaten by cloven-hoofed mammals (deer, sheep, cattle), red fox, European badger, dormouse, and squirrel. The fruit are eaten by frugivorous birds from late summer to winter, including Bohemian waxwing, blackbirds, fieldfare, and redwing. Cloven-hoofed mammals may also browse the foliage and bark excessively. The plant roots can be found in symbiosis with arbuscular mycorrhizal and less commonly with ectomycorrhizal fungi.

It is usually later superseded by larger forest trees. In Central Europe it often grows in association with red-berried elder, goat willow, Eurasian aspen, and silver birch. The plant is fire-intolerant and tends not to accumulate plant litter.

Other species of the genus Sorbus, and also species in the related genus Aria, readily hybridise with S. aucuparia and hybrid speciation can result. Plants of hybrid origin between these two genera are now classified in the genus Hedlundia, and include Hedlundia hybrida, a small tree with oval serrated leaves and two to three pairs of leaflets, which is a hybrid with Hedlundia intermedia, and Hedlundia thuringiaca, a medium-size tree with elongated leaves and one to three pairs of leaflets that are sometimes fused at the central vein, which is a hybrid with Aria edulis.

The main pests for S. aucuparia are the apple fruit moth Argyresthia conjugella and the rowan berry-borer Hoplocampa alpina. The rust fungus Gymnosporangium cornutum produces leaf galls. The leaves are not palatable to insects, but are used by insect larvae, including by the moth Venusia cambrica, the case-bearer moth Coleophora anatipennella, and leaf miners of the genus Stigmella. The snail Cornu aspersum feeds on the leaves. The plant can suffer from fire blight.

== Uses ==
=== Culinary ===
The fruit of S. aucuparia were used in the past to lure and catch birds. To humans, the fruit are bitter, astringent, laxative and diuretic. They have vitamin C, so they prevent scurvy, but the parasorbic acid irritates the gastric mucosa. Pharmacist Mannfried Pahlow wrote that he questioned the toxicity of the fruit but advised against consuming large amounts. The fruit contain sorbitol, which can be used as a sugar substitute by diabetics, but its production is no longer relevant. Sorbus aucuparia fruits have been used in the traditional Austrian medicine internally (as tea, syrup, jelly or liqueur) for treatment of disorders of the respiratory tract, fever, infections, colds, flu, rheumatism and gout.

Due to their bitterness, raw rowan berries normally are not very palatable, but can be debittered and made into compote, jelly, jam, a tart syrup or chutney, pressed into juice. It is also used to make wine, liqueurs, teas, and flour. Fruit are served as a side dish to lamb or game. Debittering can be accomplished by freezing, cooking, or drying, which degrades the parasorbic acid. The fruit are red coloured in August but usually only harvested in October after the first frost by cutting the corymbs. The robust qualities of S. aucuparia make it a source for fruit in harsh mountain climate and Maria Theresa, ruler of the Habsburg monarchy, recommended the planting of the species in 1779. The oldest Finnish candy still commercially produced, Pihlaja, is named after and originally contained rowanberries.

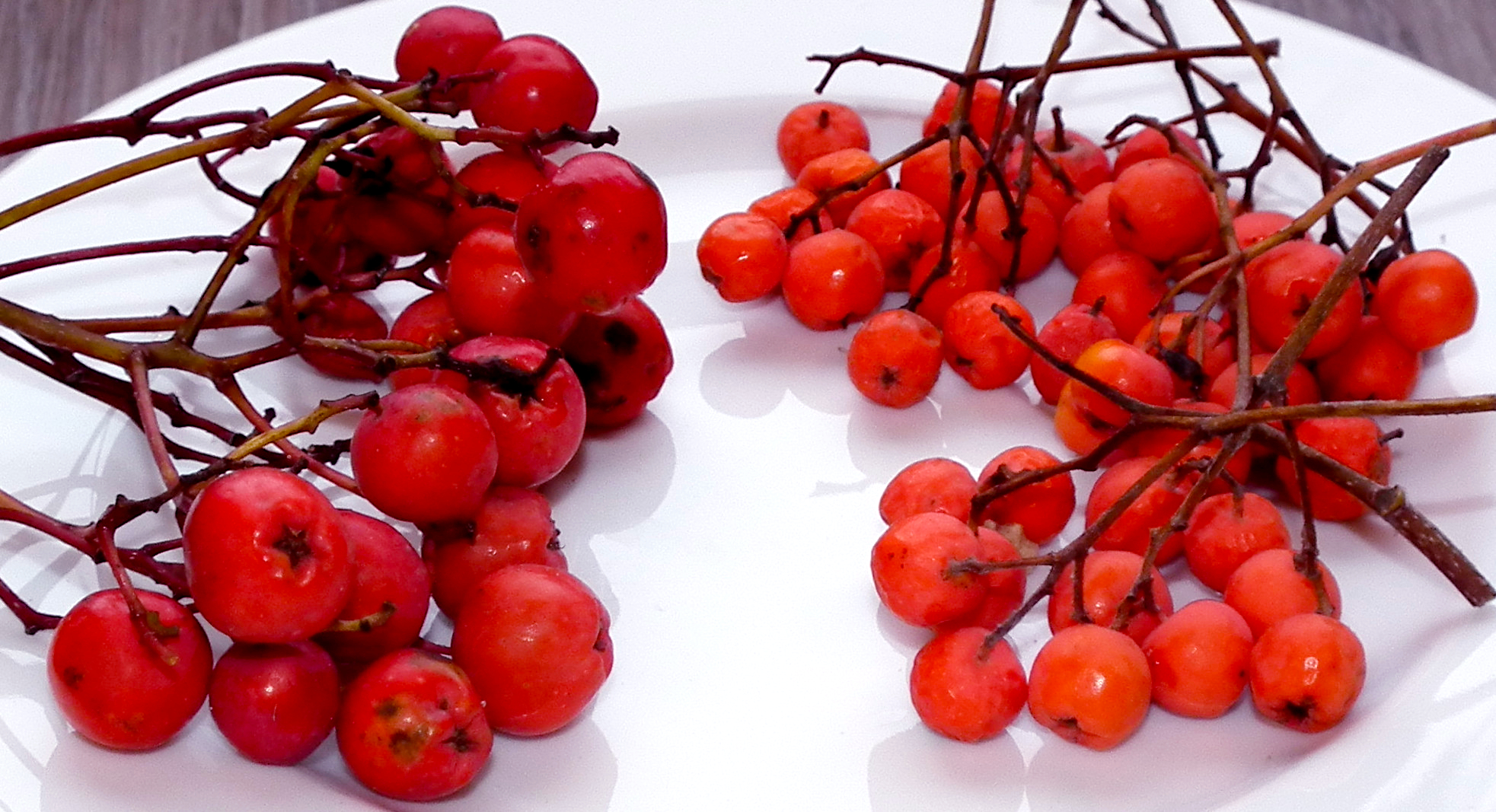
Comparison of fruit from an edible cultivar (left) and a roadside tree (right)

A more palatable variety, named Sorbus aucuparia var. dulcis Kraetzl, or var. edulis Dieck, or var. moravica Dippel, was first discovered in 1810 near Ostružná in the Hrubý Jeseník mountain range of Northern Moravia and became widespread in Germany and Austria the early 20th century. Its leaves are larger and pointed, only the front part of the leaflets is serrated, and they have darker bark, larger buds and larger fruit. Similar non-bitter varieties found in Southern Russia were first introduced in Central Europe in 1900 as 'Rossica' and 'Rossica Major', which has large fruit up to 1.5 cm (5/8 in) in diameter.

Two widespread cultivars of the Moravian variety are 'Konzentra' and 'Rosina', which were selected beginning in 1946 by the Institut für Gartenbau Dresden-Pillnitz, an agricultural research institute in Saxony, from 75 specimens found mostly in the Ore Mountains, and made available in 1954. Fruit of the more widely used 'Konzentra' are small to medium-sized, mildly aromatic and tart, easier to transport because of their thicker peel, and used for juicing, while fruit of 'Rosina' are larger, sweet and tart, and aromatic, and candied or used in compote. The two cultivars are self-pollinating, yield fruit early, and the sugar content increases while the acid content decreases as the fruit ripens. 'Beissneri' is a cultivar with reddish foliage and bark and serrated leaves. Other edible varieties originate in and are named after Klosterneuburg, Lower Austria.

Russian botanist Ivan Vladimirovich Michurin began in 1905 to crossbreed common S. aucuparia with other species to create fruit trees. His experiments resulted in the cultivars 'Burka', 'Likjornaja', 'Dessertnaja', 'Granatnaja', 'Rubinovaja', and 'Titan'. Other S. aucuparia hybrids planted in Western Europe beginning in the 1980s include 'Apricot Queen', 'Brilliant Yellow', 'Chamois Glow', 'Pink Queen', and 'Salmon Queen'.

The leaves were fermented with leaves of sweet gale and oak bark to create herb beer. Fruits are eaten as a mash in small amounts against lack of appetite or an upset stomach and stimulate production of gastric acid. In folk medicine they are used as a laxative, against rheumatism and kidney disease, and as a gargled juice against hoarseness.

=== Timber ===
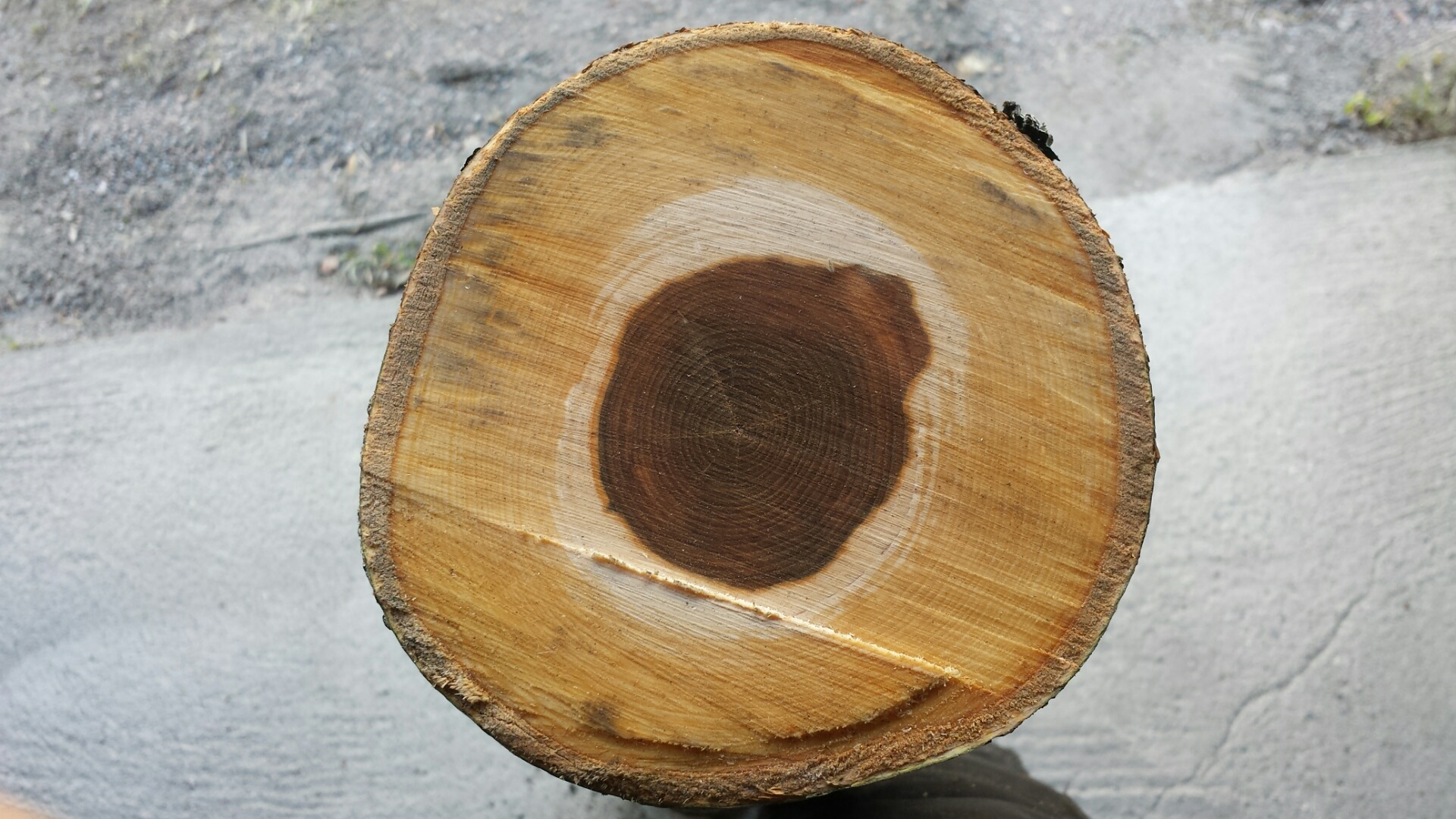
Freshly cross-cut Sorbus aucuparia with visible heart-wood

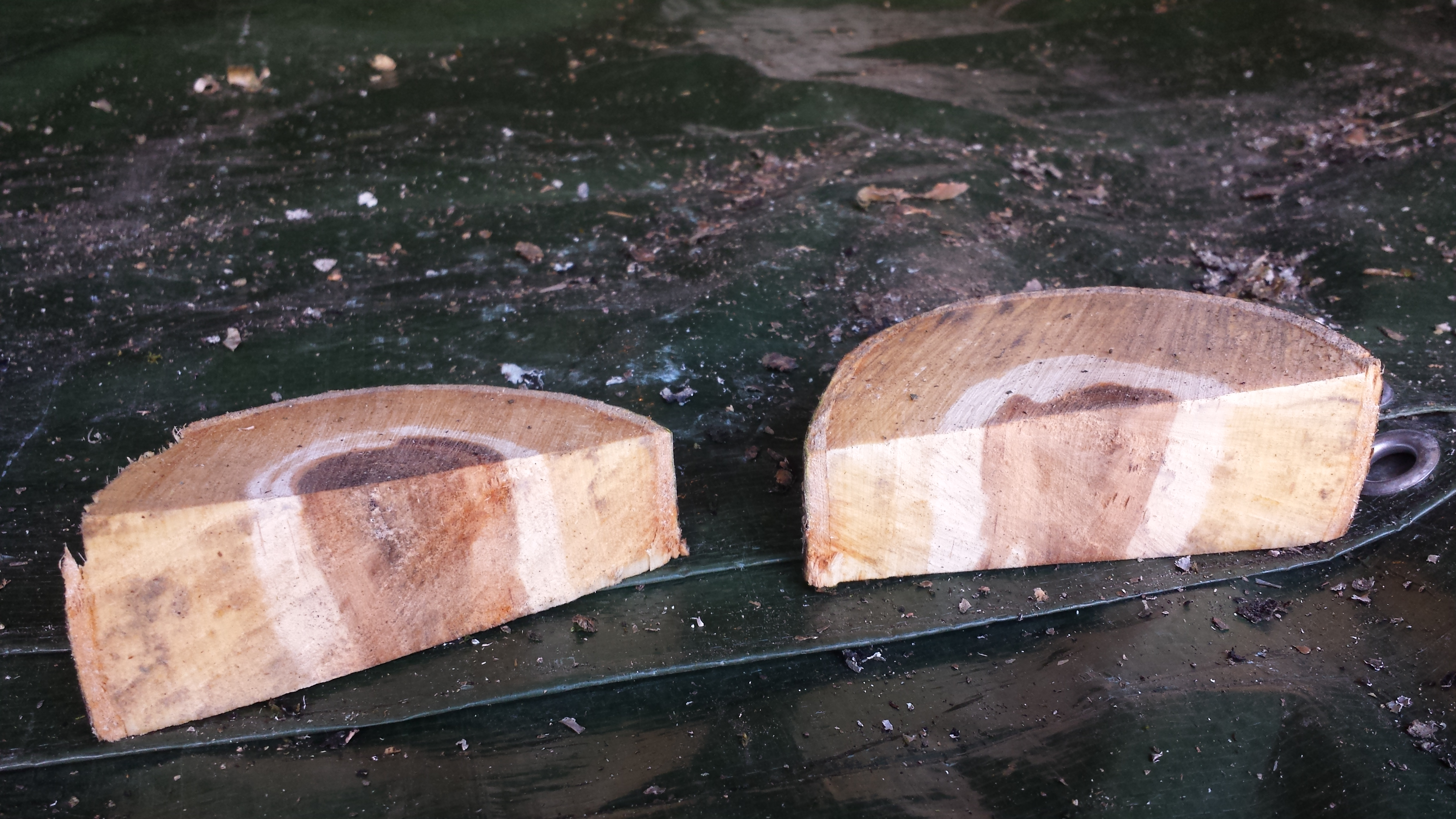
Freshly rip-cut Sorbus aucuparia with visible heart-wood

The wood is used for cartwright's work, turner's work, and woodcarving. Wood can be used from trees as young as 20 years. The sapwood is golden and white, while the heart-wood is brown. In almost treeless regions it is used as firewood. The leaves are sometimes used as fodder for livestock while the fruit are used against erysipeloid infections in domestic pigs and goats. Bark of the plant was used to dye wool brown or red. Honey from the flowers is strongly aromatic and has a reddish colour.

The species is planted in mountain ranges to fortify landslide and avalanche zones.

=== Ornamental ===
It is also used as an ornamental plant in parks, gardens, or as an avenue tree. Ornamental cultivars include 'Asplenifolia', which has divided and sharply serrated leaflets, 'Blackhawk', which has large fruit and dark green foliage, 'Fastigiata', which has an upright columnar form, 'Fructu Luteo', which has orange yellow fruit, 'Michred', which has brilliant red fruit, 'Pendula', which is a weeping tree, and 'Xanthocarpa', which has orange yellow fruit.

'Sheerwater Seedling', an upright and slender cultivar, and 'Wisley Gold' with yellow fruits, have received the Royal Horticultural Society's Award of Garden Merit.

Cultivars are vegetatively propagated via cuttings, grafting, or shield budding.

== In culture ==
In the Prose Edda, the Norse god Thor saves himself from a rapid river created by the giantess Gjálp by grabbing hold of a rowan, which became known as "Thor's protection".

In English folklore, twigs of S. aucuparia were believed to ward off evil spirits and witches. The plant was called "the witch" in England and dowsing rods to find ores were made out of its wood. Twigs were used to drive cattle to the pasture for the first time in spring to ensure their health and fertility. The wooden shafts of forks and other farm implements were constructed from the species to protect farm animals and production from witches' spells. In weather lore, a year with plentiful rowan fruit would have a good grain harvest but be followed by a severe winter.

In Scottish folklore, boughs of rowan were traditionally taken into cattle byres in May to protect livestock from evil, and rowan trees were planted in pastures for similar purposes.

S. aucuparia is used in the coats of arms of the German municipalities Ebernhahn, Eschenrode, and Hermsdorf, and of the Vysočina Region of the Czech Republic. Rowan is part of the coat of arms of the Metropolitan Borough of Wigan and the logo of both Wigan Athletic F.C. and Wigan Warriors.
