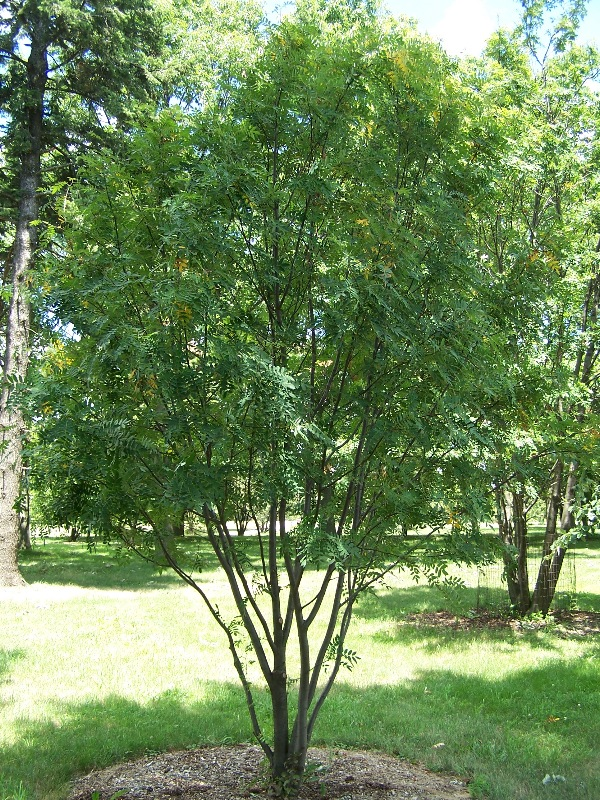

Scientific classification
- Kingdom: Plantae
- Clade: Tracheophytes
- Clade: Angiosperms
- Clade: Eudicots
- Clade: Rosids
- Order: Rosales
- Family: Rosaceae
- Genus: Sorbus
- Species: S. hupehensis

Binomial name
- Sorbus hupehensis C.K.Schneid.

Synonyms
- Pyrus ailanthoides M.F.Fay & Christenh.; Pyrus hupehensis (C.K.Schneid.) Bean; Pyrus mesogea Cardot

= Sorbus hupehensis =

Species of tree

Sorbus hupehensis, also known as Hupeh rowan or Hubei rowan, is a species of rowan native to central and western China. It is found between Qinghai and Gansu in the west, Yunnan in the south, Jiangxi in the southeast, and Shandong in the east.

== Description ==
Sorbus hupehensis is a small deciduous tree growing to 5–10 m tall, with grey-brown to purplish-brown bark. The branches and shoots are slender. The leaves are green above, paler beneath, 10–15 cm long, pinnate with 7-17 narrow oval leaflets 3–5 cm long and 1–1.8 cm broad, with an acute apex, and serrated margins. They change to orange or red in autumn. The flowers are 5–7 mm diameter, with five white petals and 20 yellowish-white stamens; they are produced in corymbs 6–10 cm diameter in late spring to early summer. The fruit is a pome 5–8 mm diameter, bright pink with persistent sepals, maturing in late autumn.

== Taxonomy ==
There are two varieties:

- Sorbus hupehensis var. hupehensis. Leaves with 9-17 narrow leaflets. Most of the species' range.
- Sorbus hupehensis var. paucijuga (D.K.Zang & P.C.Huang) L.T.Lu. Leaves with 7-9 broad leaflets. Shandong Province.

== Cultivation and uses ==
It is grown as an ornamental tree, valued for its white fruit contrasting with the orange autumn colour.

In cultivation, it has often been confused with the related Sorbus oligodonta (white-fruited or kite-leaf rowan) from south-western China. The former differs in being a larger tree (to 15 m) with stouter shoots and larger leaves, is a tetraploid apomictic species which breeds true. The cultivar 'Pink Pagoda', often cited as belonging to S. hupehensis, is actually of S. oligodonta.
