= Potassium sorbate =

Chemical compound

- The structure of potassium sorbate

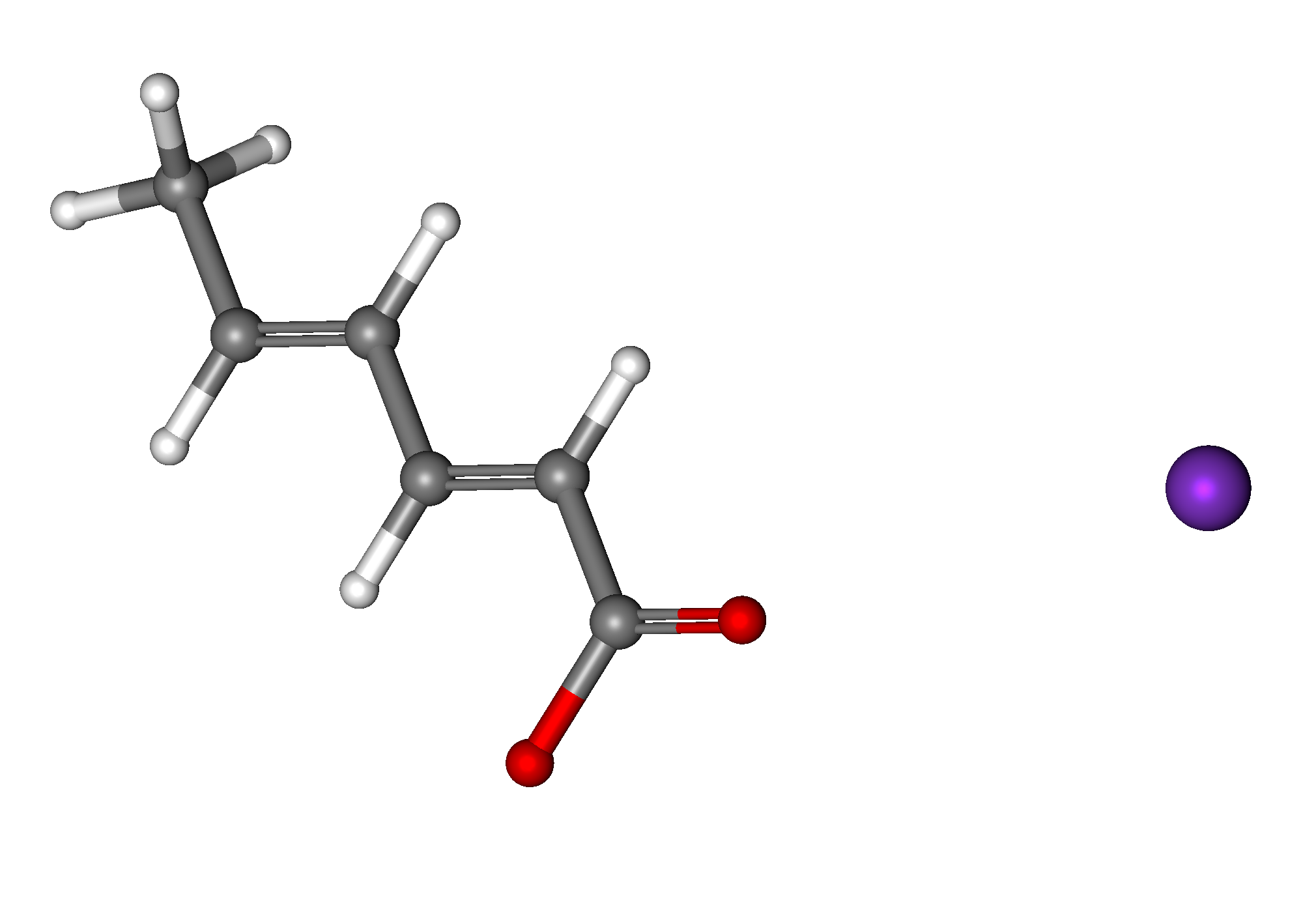

Names
- Preferred IUPAC name Potassium (2E,4E)-hexa-2,4-dienoate
- Other names: E202; Sorbistat-K; Sorbistat potassium

Identifiers
CAS Number	24634-61-5
3D model (JSmol)	Interactive image
ChEBI	CHEBI:77868
ChemSpider	4445644
ECHA InfoCard	100.042.145
E number	E202 (preservatives)
KEGG	D02411
PubChem CID	23676745
UNII	1VPU26JZZ4
CompTox Dashboard (EPA)	DTXSID7027835
- InChI: InChI=1S/C6H8O2.K/c1-2-3-4-5-6(7)8;/h2-5H,1H3,(H,7,8);/q;+1/p-1/b3-2+,5-4+; Key: CHHHXKFHOYLYRE-STWYSWDKSA-M; InChI=1/C6H8O2.K/c1-2-3-4-5-6(7)8;/h2-5H,1H3,(H,7,8);/q;+1/p-1/b3-2+,5-4+; Key: CHHHXKFHOYLYRE-ZCSOUONQBI
- SMILES: [K+].[O-]C(=O)\C=C\C=C\C

Properties
Chemical formula	C_{6}H_{7}KO_{2}
Molar mass	150.218 g·mol^{−1}
Appearance	White crystals
Odor	Yes
Density	1.363 g/cm^{3}
Melting point	270 °C (518 °F; 543 K) decomposes
Solubility in water	58.5 g/100 mL (100 °C)
Solubility in other solvents	Soluble in ethanol, propylene glycol; Slightly soluble in acetone; Very slightly soluble in chloroform, corn oil, ether; Insoluble in benzene

Hazards
- GHS labelling
Pictograms	(GHS07: Exclamation mark)
Signal word	Warning
Hazard statements	H319
NFPA 704 (fire diamond)	2 1 0
- Lethal dose or concentration (LD, LC)
LD_{50} (median dose)	4920 mg/kg (oral, rat)
Safety data sheet (SDS)	Fisher Scientific
- Except where otherwise noted, data are given for materials in their standard state (at 25 °C [77 °F], 100 kPa). verify (what is ?) Infobox references

Potassium sorbate is the potassium salt of sorbic acid, structural formula CH_{3}CH=CH−CH=CH−CO_{2}K. It is a white salt that is very soluble in water (58.2% at 20 °C). It is primarily used as a food preservative (E number 202). Potassium sorbate is effective in a variety of applications including food, wine, and personal care products. While sorbic acid occurs naturally in rowan and hippophae berries, virtually all of the world's supply of sorbic acid, from which potassium sorbate is derived, is manufactured synthetically.

== Production ==
Potassium sorbate is produced industrially by neutralizing sorbic acid with potassium hydroxide. The precursor sorbic acid is produced in a two-step process via the condensation of crotonaldehyde and ketene.

== Uses ==
Potassium sorbate is used to inhibit molds and yeasts in many foods, such as cheese, wine, yogurt, dried meats, apple cider, dried fruits, soft drinks and fruit drinks, and baked goods. It can also be found in the ingredients list of many dried fruit products. In addition, herbal dietary supplement products generally contain potassium sorbate, which acts to prevent mold and microbes and to increase shelf life. It is used in quantities at which no adverse health effects are known, over short periods of time. Labeling of this preservative on ingredient statements reads as "potassium sorbate" or "E202".

Also, it is used in many personal care products to inhibit the development of microorganisms to increase shelf stability. Some manufacturers use this preservative as a replacement for parabens.

Also known as "wine stabilizer", potassium sorbate produces sorbic acid when added to wine. It serves two purposes:

- When active fermentation has ceased and the wine is racked for the final time after clearing, potassium sorbate renders any surviving yeast incapable of multiplying. Yeast living at that moment can continue fermenting any residual sugar into CO_{2} and alcohol, but when they die, no new yeast will be present to cause future fermentation. When a wine is sweetened before bottling, potassium sorbate is used to prevent refermentation when used in conjunction with potassium metabisulfite. It is primarily used with sweet wines, sparkling wines, and some hard ciders, but may be added to table wines, which may not maintain their clarity after fining.
- It also inhibits bacteria, especially Clostridium botulinum. Tube feeding of potassium sorbate reduces the amount of pathogenic bacteria in the stomach.

Some molds (notably some Trichoderma and Penicillium strains) and yeasts are able to detoxify sorbates by decarboxylation, producing piperylene (1,3-pentadiene). The pentadiene manifests as a typical odor of kerosene or petroleum.

== Toxicology ==
In pure form, potassium sorbate is a skin, eye, and respiratory irritant. Concentrations up to 0.5% are not significant skin irritants.

As a food additive, potassium sorbate is used as a preservative in concentrations of 0.025%–0.1%, which in a 100 g serving yields an intake of 25–100 mg. In the United States, no more than 0.1% is allowed in fruit butters, jellies, preserves, and related products. Up to 0.4% has been studied in low-salt, naturally-fermented pickles, and when combined with calcium chloride, 0.2% made "good quality pickles." Potassium sorbate has about 74% of sorbic acid's anti-microbial activity. When calculated as sorbic acid, 0.3% is allowed in "cold pack cheese food." The upper pH limit for effectiveness is 6.5.

The maximum acceptable daily intake for human consumption is 25 mg/kg, or 1.75 g daily for an average adult (70 kg). Under some conditions, particularly at high concentrations or when combined with nitrites, potassium sorbate has shown genotoxic activity in vitro.

Three studies conducted in the 1970s did not find it to have any carcinogenic effects in rats. However, a 2009-2023 cohort study of 105,260 participants in France found a 14% increase in overall cancer risk and 26% increase in breast cancer risk associated with high consumption of potassium sorbate.

== See also ==
- Sodium benzoate
