= Sorbus oligodonta =

Scientific classification
- Kingdom: Plantae
- Clade: Tracheophytes
- Clade: Angiosperms
- Clade: Eudicots
- Clade: Rosids
- Order: Rosales
- Family: Rosaceae
- Genus: Sorbus
- Species: S. oligodonta

Binomial name
- Sorbus oligodonta (Cardot) Hand.-Mazz.

Synonyms
- Pyrus glabrescens Cardot in Notul.; Pyrus oligodonta Cardot; Sorbus glabrescens (Cardot) Hand.-Mazz.

Species of tree

Sorbus oligodonta, also known as the kite-leaf rowan and white-fruited rowan, is a species of rowan found from the eastern Himalaya to south-central China, northern Vietnam and Myanmar.

== Description ==
Sorbus oligodonta is a small to medium-sized deciduous tree growing to 5–15 m tall, with a rounded crown and dark grey bark. The leaves are green to glaucous blue-green above, paler beneath, 10–26 cm long, pinnate with 9-17 oval leaflets 3–5.5 cm long and 1–2 cm broad, broadest near the middle or apex (hence the English name 'kite-leaf'), rounded at the end with a short acuminate apex, and very finely serrated margins; the basal leaflets are smaller than the apical leaflets. They change to a dark orange-red in late autumn, later than most other rowan species. The flowers are 8 mm diameter, with five white or yellowish-white petals and 20 yellowish-white stamens; they are produced in corymbs 6–15 cm diameter in late spring to early summer. The fruit is a pome 7–8 mm diameter, white or pale to deep pink with a persistent dark or pinkish carpel, maturing in late autumn; the fruit stalks are distinctively red. The fruit commonly persist long into the winter after leaf fall; after being softened by frost they are readily eaten by thrushes and waxwings, which disperse the seeds.

It is a tetraploid species which breeds true without pollination by apomixis.

== Cultivation and uses ==
Outside of its native range, it is grown as an ornamental tree for its decorative pale pink or white fruit in western Europe and the Pacific Northwest of North America. Selected cultivars include 'Pink Pagoda' and 'November Pink'. In the past, plants in cultivation were commonly misidentified as, or treated as synonyms of, Sorbus hupehensis, a species from further north in China (Hubei) which is much less common in cultivation.
