= Coat of arms of Wigan =

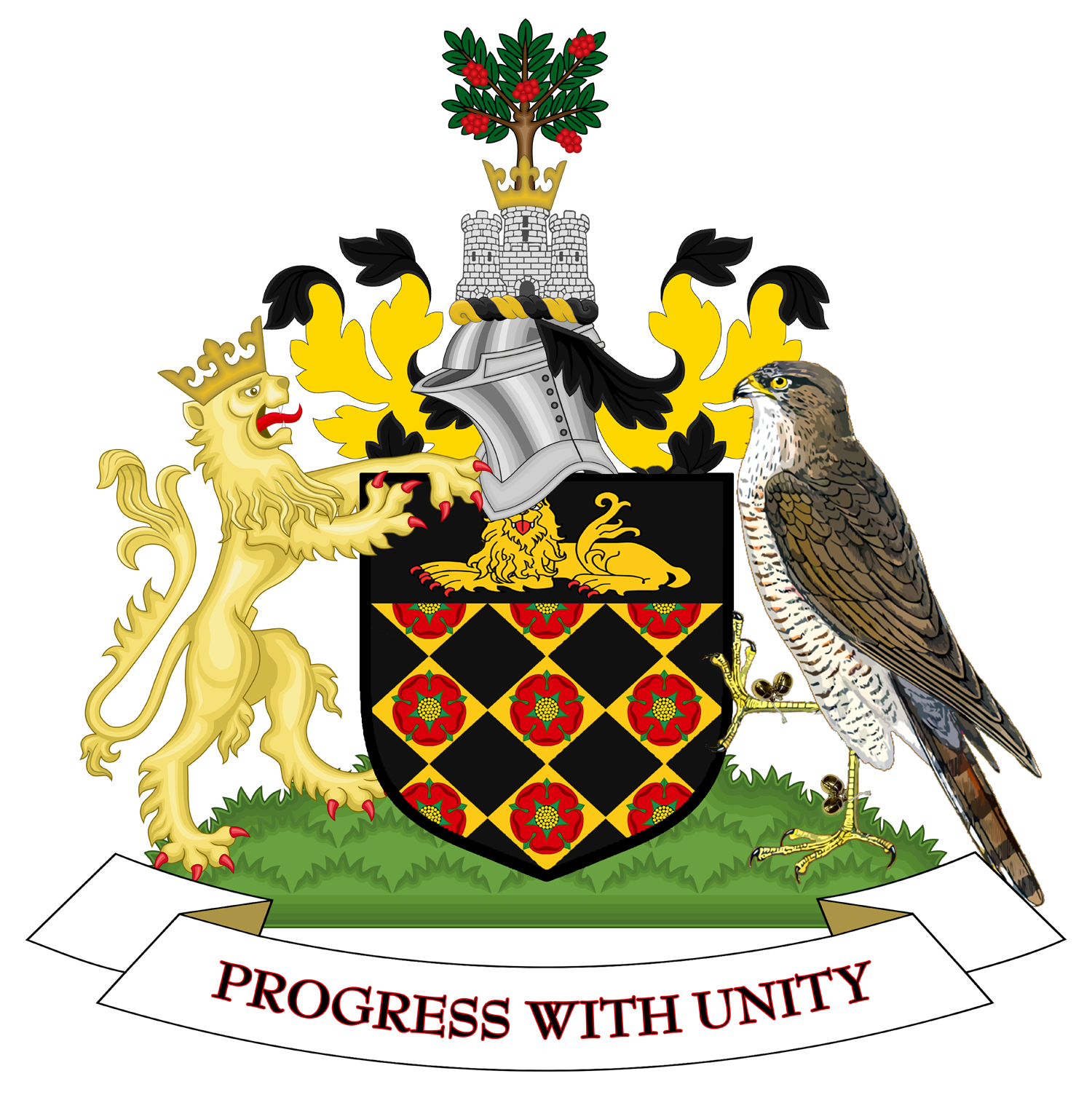
Arms of Wigan Metropolitan Borough Council

The coat of arms of Wigan Metropolitan Borough Council was granted by the College of Arms in 1974.

== Arms of Wigan Metropolitan Borough Council ==
The field of the arms consists of alternating gold and black lozenges or diamond shapes. Black lozenges are extensively used in British civic heraldry to symbolise coal mining, while each gold lozenge bears a red rose of Lancaster to represent the union of several Lancashire communities in the metropolitan borough. The chief or top section of the shield displays a couchant lion from the crest of the county borough.

On top of the helm is the crest which consists of a crowned castle and mountain ash tree. The castle and crown were in the county borough arms. The tree is included as a reference to the borough's name: the local name for the mountain ash being "Wiggin Tree".

The supporters are a gold crowned lion from the county borough arms, and a sparrowhawk from the arms of the Atherton family, and found in the devices of Atherton Urban District council and the Borough of Leigh.

The motto is Progress With Unity.

=== Blazon ===
The blazon, or technical description of the arms is:

Lozengy Or and Sable each Lozenge Or charged with a Rose Gules barbed and seeded proper on a Chief Sable a Lion couchant guardant Or; and for the Crest: On a Wreath of the Colours in front of a Mountain Ash (Wiggin Tree) fructed proper a Castle triple towered Argent the centre tower ensigned by an Ancient Crown Or; and for the Supporters: On the dexter side a Lion crowned with an Ancient Crown Or and on the sinister side a Sparrowhawk close proper belled Or; the whole upon a Compartment representing a Grassy Mount proper.

== Arms of the County Borough of Wigan ==
The authority of Wigan County Borough was granted arms in 1922. The design incorporated several elements from a number of ancient seals.

The arms consisted of a red shield bearing a silver triple-towered castle with a gold ancient crown over the central tower. The design was taken from the earliest surviving seal of the borough dating from the twelfth century, which showed a castellated gateway over which appeared a crowned head, believed to be that of Henry I.

The crest consisted of a gold couchant lion in front of the head and shoulders of a king in a red robe and gold crown. The depiction used on the letters patent granting the arms was modelled on a portrait of Edward III. The lion was taken from the royal arms of England. In a charter of 1350 Edward granted Wigan the right to use a seal known as the King's Recognaisance Seal on which were depicted the king's head and royal lion.

The supporters were also royal lions, each holding aloft a branch of mountain ash or "Wiggin Tree".

The motto was Ancient and Loyal. Wigan described itself as the "Ancient and Loyal Borough", an epithet originating in the 1663 charter of Charles II which described the town as an "ancient borough" and noted its "loyalty to us". The 1663 charter governed the town until its reform by the Municipal Corporations Act 1835.

=== Blazon ===
The arms were blazoned as follows:

Gules a castle with three towers Argent surmounted by a crown composed of fleurs-de-lys Or; and for the Crest: on a wreath of the colours, in front of a king's head affrontée, couped below the shoulder proper, vested Gules, crowned and crined Or, a lion couchant gurdant Or; and for Supporters: on either side a lion Or holding in the exterior paw a branch of mountain ash proper.

== Seal used before 1922 ==
Seal of Wigan before 1922

The design on a seal adopted in the seventeenth century was used in lieu of arms until 1922. The seal was oval in shape and bore a depiction of Wigan's Moot Hall. The building had been the earliest meeting place for the borough corporation, and featured a belfry and a market cross. The Latin inscription was Sigillum commune villæ et burgi de Wigan.
