= Calcium sorbate =

Chemical compound

Names
- Preferred IUPAC name Calcium di[(2E,4E)-hexa-2,4-dienoate]

Identifiers
CAS Number	7492-55-9
3D model (JSmol)	Interactive image
ChemSpider	4938651
ECHA InfoCard	100.028.474
E number	E203 (preservatives)
PubChem CID	6433506
UNII	2P47R6817F
CompTox Dashboard (EPA)	DTXSID2052491
- InChI: InChI=1/2C6H8O2.Ca/c2*1-2-3-4-5-6(7)8;/h2*2-5H,1H3,(H,7,8);/q;;+2/p-2/b2*3-2+,5-4+; Key: MCFVRESNTICQSJ-AXDCTYHGBC
- SMILES: [Ca+2].O=C([O-])\C=C\C=C\C.[O-]C(=O)\C=C\C=C\C

Properties
Chemical formula	C_{12}H_{14}CaO_{4}
Molar mass	262.318 g·mol^{−1}
Solubility in water	Very slightly soluble
Solubility in other solvents	Very slightly soluble in organic solvents, fats, and oils
- Except where otherwise noted, data are given for materials in their standard state (at 25 °C [77 °F], 100 kPa). Infobox references

Calcium sorbate is the calcium salt of sorbic acid. Calcium sorbate is a polyunsaturated fatty acid salt.

It is a commonly used food preservative; its E number is E203, but it is no longer allowed to be used in the European Union.
