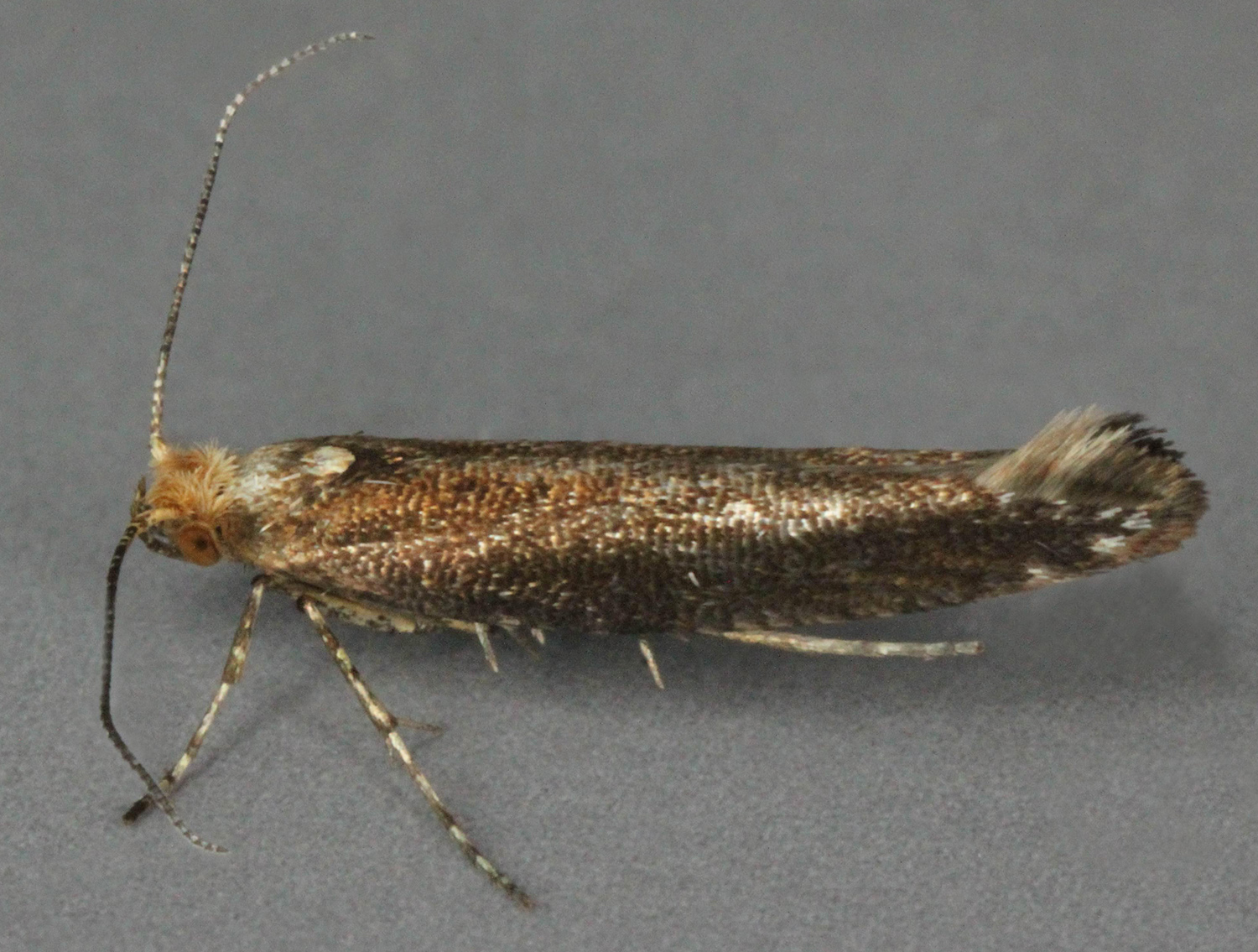
- Argyresthia conjugella form aerariella, Trawscoed, North Wales
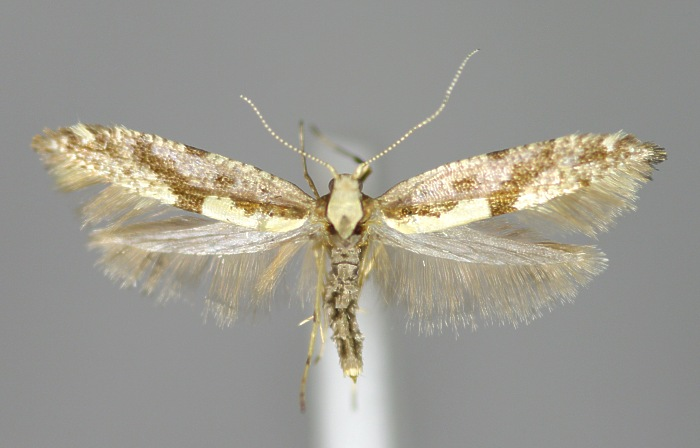

Scientific classification
- Kingdom: Animalia
- Phylum: Arthropoda
- Clade: Pancrustacea
- Class: Insecta
- Order: Lepidoptera
- Family: Argyresthiidae
- Genus: Argyresthia
- Species: A. conjugella

Binomial name
- Argyresthia conjugella Zeller, 1839

Synonyms
- Tinea maculosa Tengström, 1847; Argyresthia aerariella Stainton, 1871

= Argyresthia conjugella =

Species of moth

Argyresthia conjugella, the apple fruit moth, is a moth of the family Yponomeutidae. It is found in Europe, Siberia, Central Asia, Japan, and North America.

The wingspan is 10–14 mm. The head is yellowish-white. Forewings are rather dark purplish-fuscous; costa strigulated with whitish; a thick white dorsal streak to tornus; an interrupted dark fuscous median fascia; one or two white costal spots before apex. Hindwings are grey. The larva is dull whitish yellow; head and plate of 2 pale brown.

Adults are on wing from May to July depending on the location. The larvae feed on Sorbus aucuparia and Malus species.

The apple fruit moth, is seen to be a parasite for the apple growing communities in Finland, Norway, and Sweden. These moths are seed predators for the mountain-ash trees rowan. However, when there is a dip in the fruit produced by rowan every couple years in this region, the apple fruit moth finds a new host in the form of apples. Apples are not their desired host however and they communicate with the rowan seeds they prefer through odors.
