= Beinn a' Chaorainn =

Beinn a' Chaorainn (Mountain Of The Rowan Tree) is the name of two Munro mountains in the Scottish Highlands. It is also the name of several lesser mountains in Scotland.

- Beinn a' Chaorainn (Cairngorms) Is situated in the middle of the Cairngorms range and has a height of 1083 metres
- Beinn a' Chaorainn (Glen Spean) Lies on the northern side of Glen Spean and has a height of 1049 metres
