= Eburodunum =

Eburodunum is a Gaulish placename.

Eburodunum was the ancient name of:

- Embrun, Hautes-Alpes, France
- Yverdon-les-Bains, Switzerland
- Brno, Czechia

== See also ==
- Eburones
- Gaulish placenames
