= Parasorbic acid =

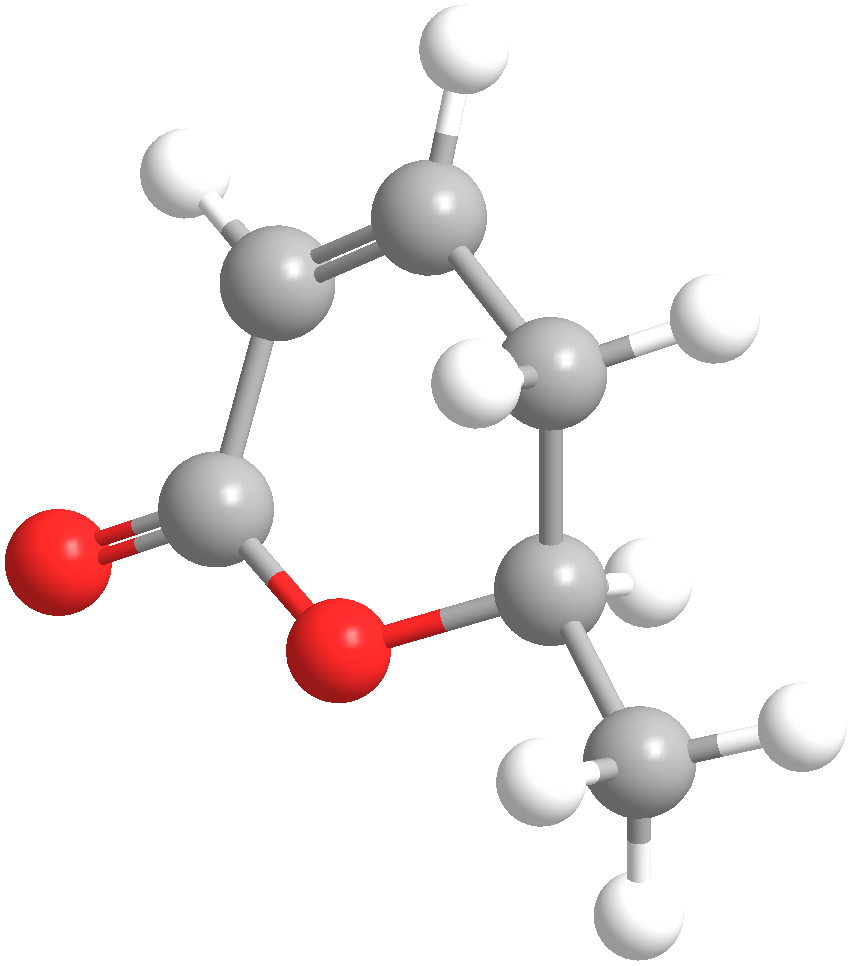

Names
- IUPAC name (6S)-5,6-dihydro-6-methyl-2H-pyran-2-one
- Other names 2-methyl-2,3-dihydropyran-6-one, 2-Hexen-5-olide, 5-hydroxy-2-Hexenoic acid δ-lactone, parasorbic acid, sorbic oil, γ-Hexenolactone, (+)-(6S)-Parasorbic acid

Identifiers
CAS Number	10048-32-5
3D model (JSmol)	Interactive image
ChEBI	CHEBI:7926
ChEMBL	ChEMBL2252704
ChemSpider	23250
DrugBank	DB14121
KEGG	C08502
PubChem CID	441575
UNII	DCN48OUK3T
CompTox Dashboard (EPA)	DTXSID50871944
- InChI: InChI=1S/C6H8O2/c1-5-3-2-4-6(7)8-5/h2,4-5H,3H2,1H3 Key: DYNKRGCMLGUEMN-UHFFFAOYSA-N
- SMILES: CC1OC(C=CC1)=O

Properties
Chemical formula	C_{6}H_{8}O_{2}
Molar mass	112.128
Appearance	colorless liquid
Density	1.0 g/mL (estimated)
Boiling point	227 °C (441 °F; 500 K) estimated
Solubility in water	50 g/L
Solubility	estimated

Thermochemistry
Std enthalpy of formation (Δ_{f}H^{⦵}_{298})	-360.03 kJ·mol^{−1}

Hazards
- GHS labelling
Pictograms	(GHS07: Exclamation mark)
Signal word	Warning
Hazard statements	H315, H319, H335
NFPA 704 (fire diamond)	2 2 0
- Except where otherwise noted, data are given for materials in their standard state (at 25 °C [77 °F], 100 kPa). Infobox references

Parasorbic acid is the cyclic lactone of sorbic acid. Thermal treatment or hydrolysis converts the lactone to sorbic acid.

== Toxicity ==
Parasorbic acid is toxic and causes indigestion and nausea, however cooking and exposure to moisture convert it to the benign food preservative sorbic acid.

== See also ==
- δ-Valerolactone
- Sorbic acid
