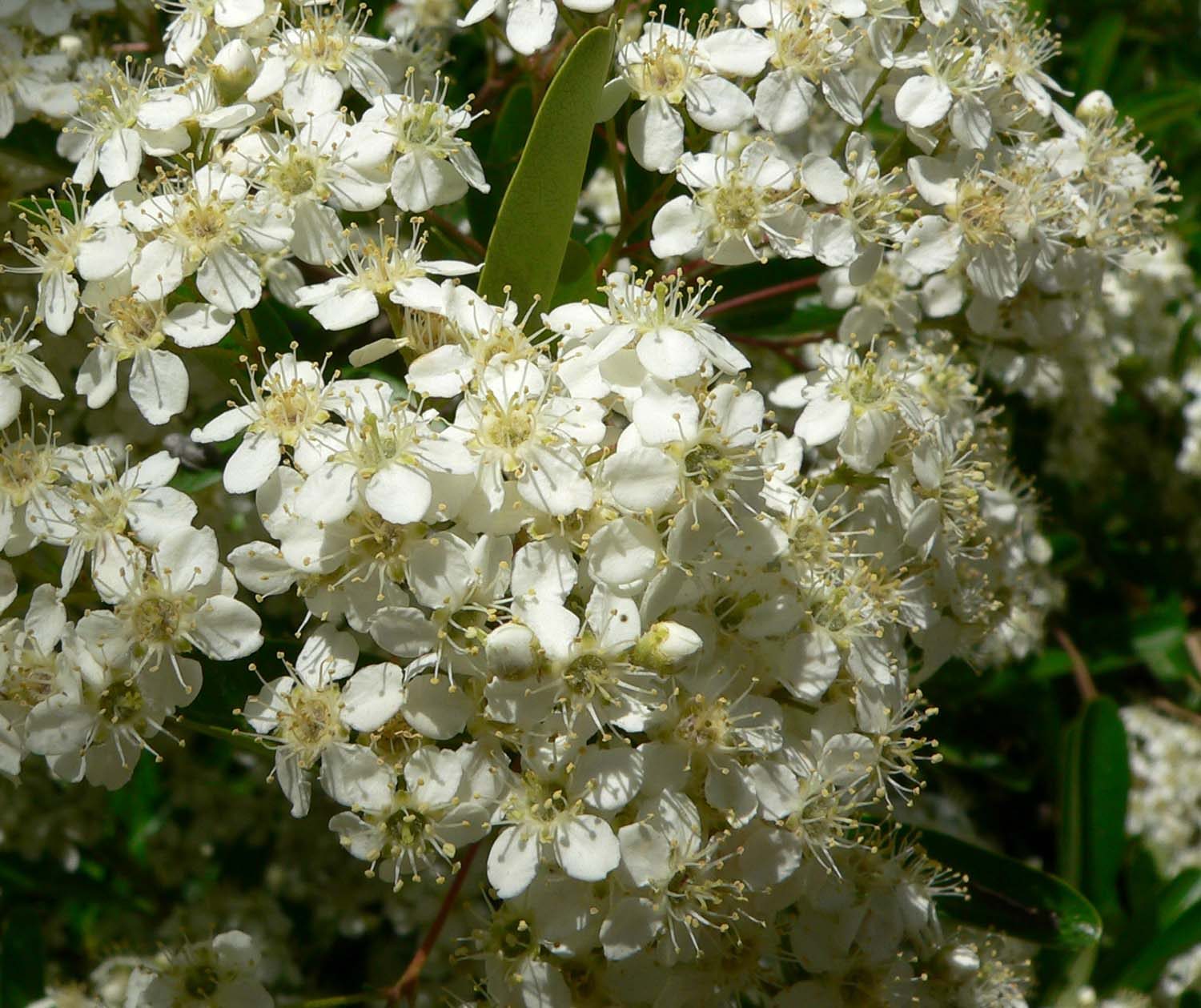
- 'Santa Cruz' cultivar

Conservation status
- Endangered (IUCN 2.3)

Scientific classification
- Kingdom: Plantae
- Clade: Tracheophytes
- Clade: Angiosperms
- Clade: Eudicots
- Clade: Rosids
- Order: Rosales
- Family: Rosaceae
- Genus: Pyracantha
- Species: P. koidzumii

Binomial name
- Pyracantha koidzumii (Hayata) Rehder

Synonyms
- Cotoneaster formosanus; Cotoneaster koidzumii; Cotoneaster taitoensis; Pyracantha formosana; Pyracantha koidzumii taitoensis

= Pyracantha koidzumii =

Species of flowering plant

Pyracantha koidzumii commonly known as Formosa firethorn or Taiwan firethorn, is a species of plant in the family Rosaceae. It is threatened by habitat loss.

== Description and distribution ==
The species is 4 metres (13 ft) tall and is native to Taiwan. However, it has been introduced to US states such as Alabama, Arkansas, Georgia, Florida and South Carolina.
