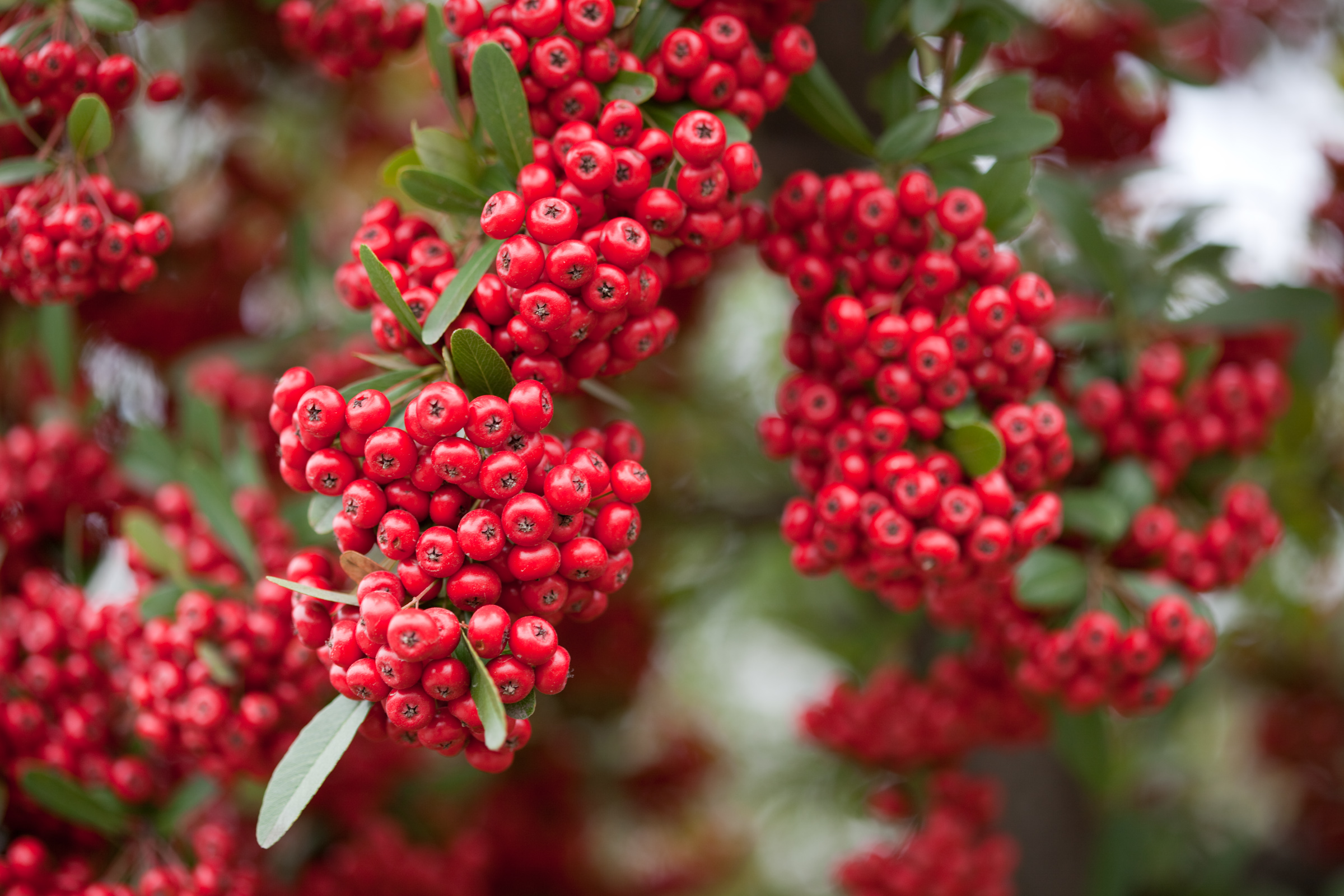
- Pyracantha branch with berry-like pomes

Scientific classification
- Kingdom: Plantae
- Clade: Tracheophytes
- Clade: Angiosperms
- Clade: Eudicots
- Clade: Rosids
- Order: Rosales
- Family: Rosaceae
- Subfamily: Amygdaloideae
- Tribe: Maleae
- Subtribe: Malinae
- Genus: Pyracantha; M.Roem.

Species
- See here

Synonyms
- Timbalia Clos

= Pyracantha =

Genus of shrubs

Pyracantha, the firethorn, is a genus of thorny, evergreen shrubs or small trees in the family Rosaceae native to south-eastern Europe and Asia. Pyracantha are cultivated as ornamental plants. They resemble and are related to Cotoneaster, but Pyracantha has thorns, bumpy leaf edges, and yellow anthers, while Cotoneaster does not grow thorns.

== Description ==
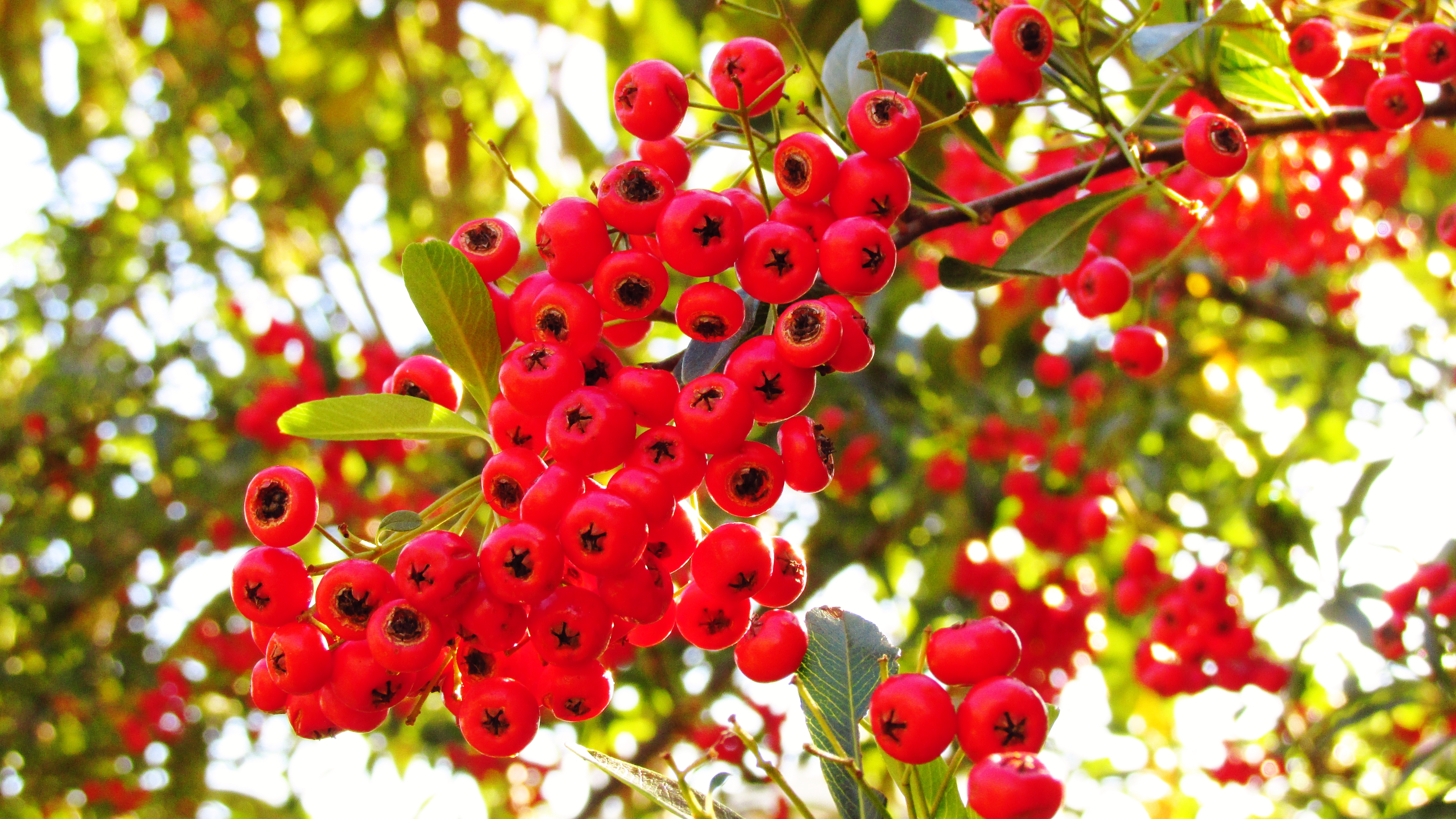
Pyracantha growing wild in a private garden in Japan. The fruit is an important food source for overwintering red-flanked bluetails (Tarsiger cyanurus).

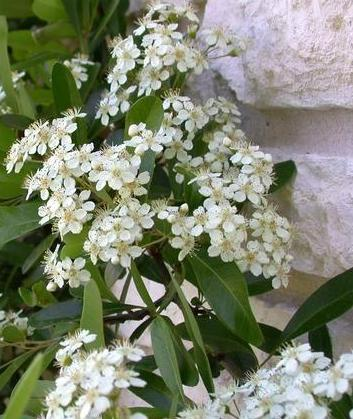
Flowers

=== Vegetative characteristics ===
Pyracantha are strongly heterophyllous, evergreen, spiny, shrubs or small trees with 1–3 erect or divergent stems. The thin, grey bark is smooth or slightly fissured. The simple, petiolate, alternate leaves have an entire, serrate, or crenulate margin.

=== Generative characteristics ===
The seven species have small white flowers which are 5-merous and many stamened. Fruit are either red, orange, or yellow pomes. The flowers are produced during late spring and early summer; the fruit develops in late summer, and matures in late autumn. The fruit of Pyracantha are classified as pomes. The pulp is safe for human consumption, but it is insipid, and the seeds are mildly poisonous as they contain cyanogenic glycosides (as do apples, plums, cherries, and almonds). Seeds that are chewed and crushed while raw will release cyanogenic glycosides, and can cause mild gastro-intestinal problems when eaten in large enough quantities. The fruit can be made into jelly. The fruits persist significantly into winter which makes them a valuable bird food.

== Taxonomy ==
Pyracantha is a member of the Rose family, and includes seven species. The genus was defined by 19th century botanist Max Joseph Roemer.

=== Etymology ===
The genus name Pyracantha, from Greek pyr "fire" and akanthos "thorn", means firethorn.

=== Species ===
Six species are accepted:

- Pyracantha angustifolia (Franch.) C.K.Schneid. – eastern Himalaya to southern China
- Pyracantha coccinea M.Roem. – southern Europe, Turkey, Crimea, Caucasus, and Iran
- Pyracantha crenulata (D.Don) M.Roem. – Himalaya (synonyms Pyracantha atalantioides (Hance) Stapf, Pyracantha fortuneana (Maxim.) H.L.Li, and Pyracantha rogersiana (A.B.Jacks.) Bean) – Himalaya to China
- Pyracantha densiflora T.T.Yu – southern China (northwestern Guangxi)
- Pyracantha inermis J.E.Vidal – south-central China and Laos
- Pyracantha koidzumii (Hayata) Rehder – Taiwan

=== Fossil record ===
A large number of fossil fruits of †Pyracantha acuticarpa have been described from middle Miocene strata of the Fasterholt area near Silkeborg in Central Jutland, Denmark.

== Ecology ==
Pyracantha fruit can be dispersed into natural areas, allowing plants to invade natural communities. Species of Pyracantha are considered to be invasive in portions of the United States, including the states of California and Georgia. Orange firethorn (Pyracantha angustifolia) is considered to be a weed or potential ("sleeper") weed in several states or territories of Australia, including Victoria, Australian Capital Territory and New South Wales. As a consequence, importation and propagation are prohibited in some parts of Australia.

== Uses ==
Orange Pyracantha in Byurakan, Armenia

Pyracantha are valuable ornamental plants, grown in gardens for their decorative flowers and fruit, often very densely borne. The thorns are easily able to puncture human skin, and when successful, the piercing causes a slight inflammation and severe pain. Their dense thorny structure makes them particularly valued in situations where an impenetrable barrier is required. The aesthetic characteristics of Pyracantha, in conjunction with their home security qualities, make them an alternative to artificial fences and walls. They are also good shrubs for a wildlife garden, providing dense cover for roosting and nesting birds, summer flowers for bees and an abundance of berries as a food source.

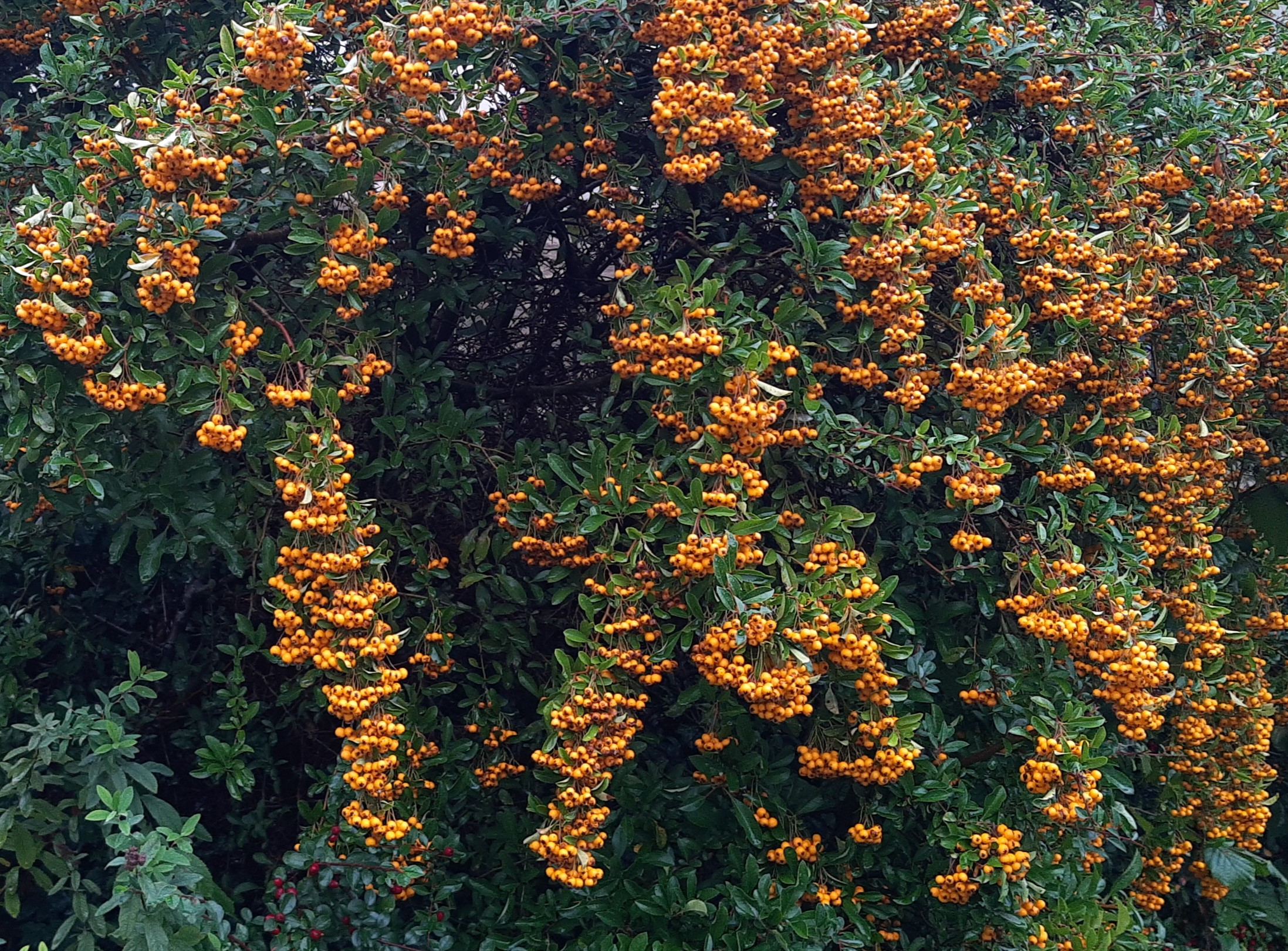
An orange variety of firethorn in Ehrenbach, Germany

The following cultivars have won the Royal Horticultural Society's Award of Garden Merit:

- Pyracantha 'Orange Glow' (orange berries)
- Pyracantha Saphyr Orange ('Cadange') (orange berries)
- Pyracantha Saphyr Rouge ('Cadrou') (orange-red berries)
- Pyracantha 'Teton' (orange-yellow berries)
- Pyracantha rogersiana 'Flava' (yellow berries)

== Gallery ==
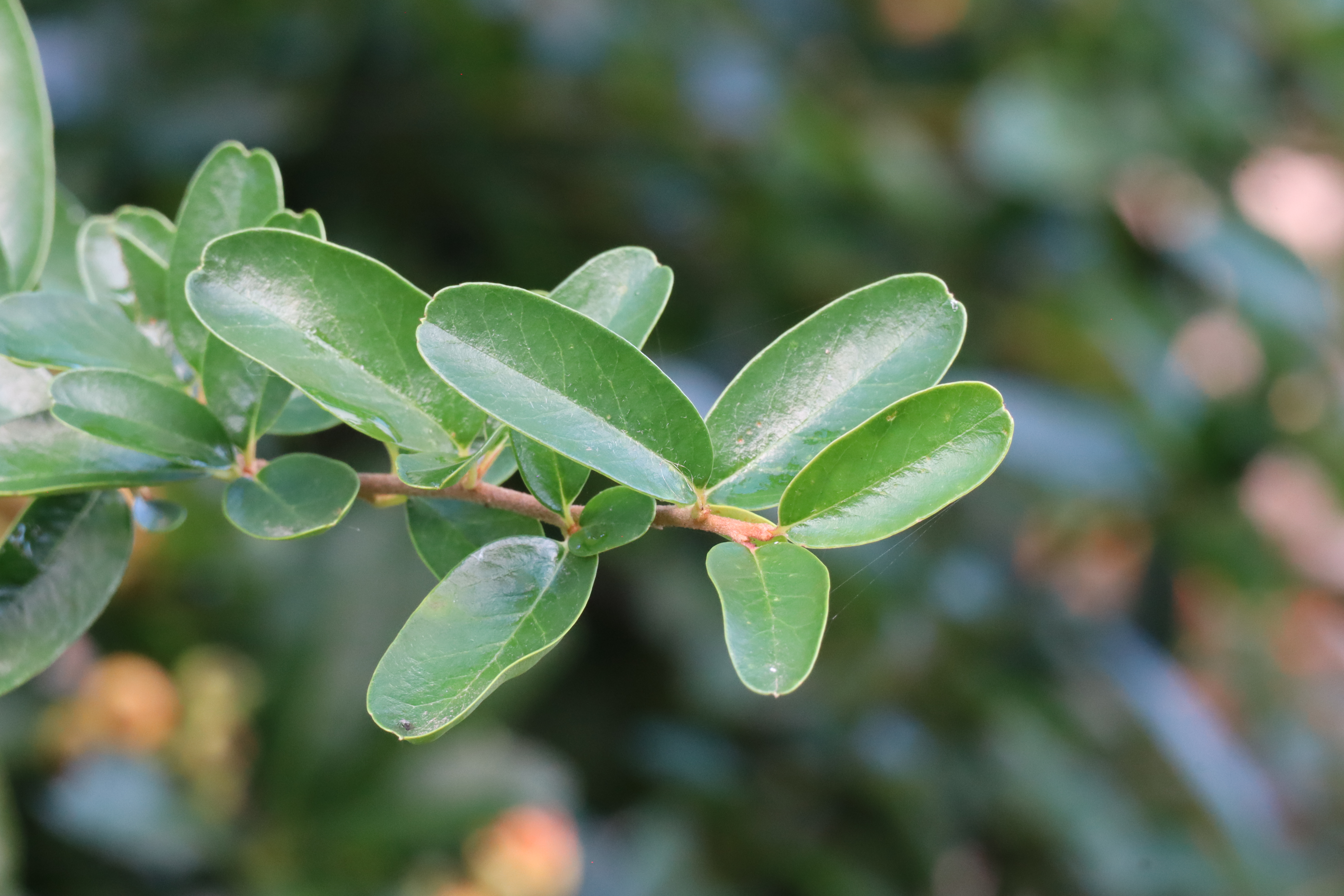

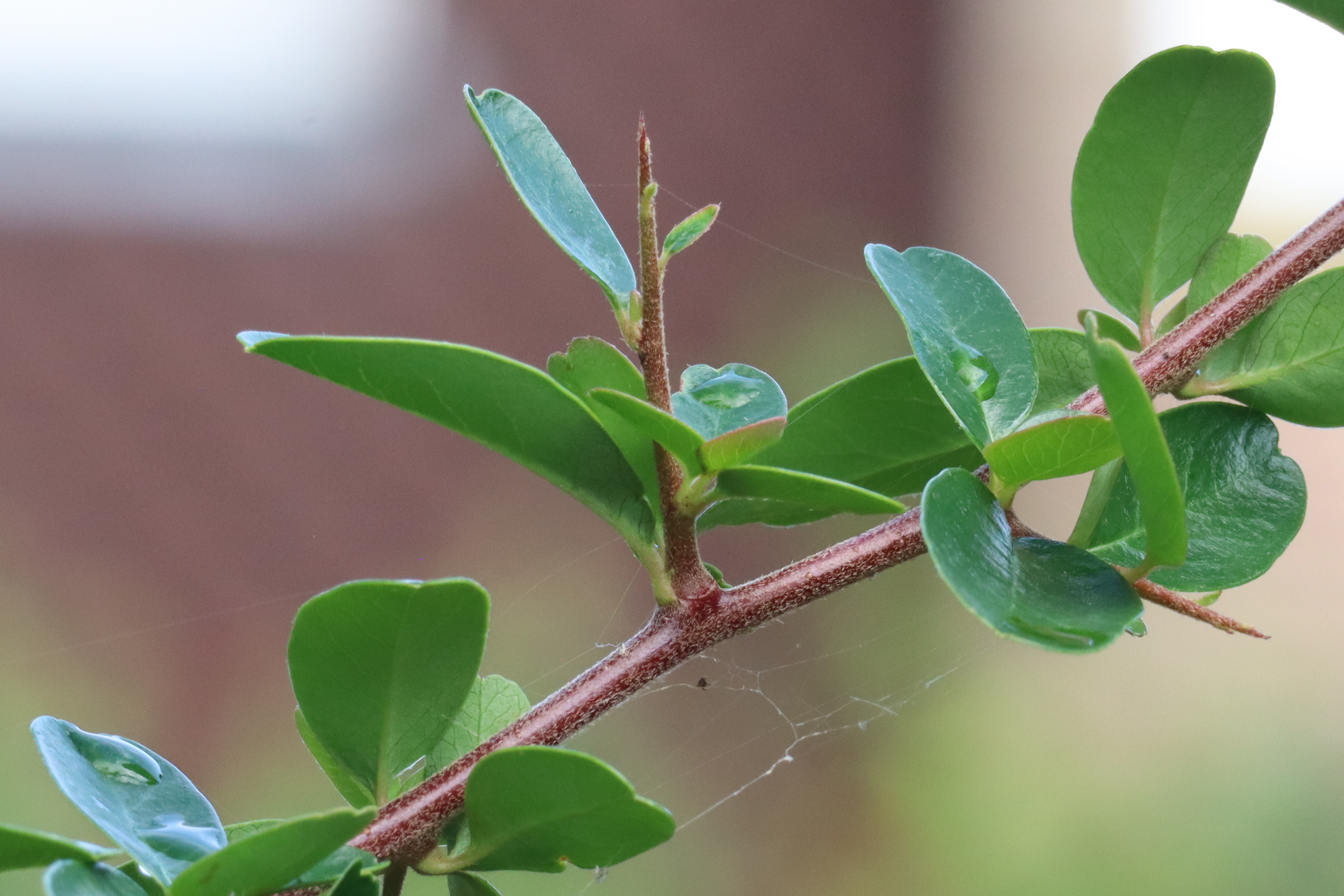

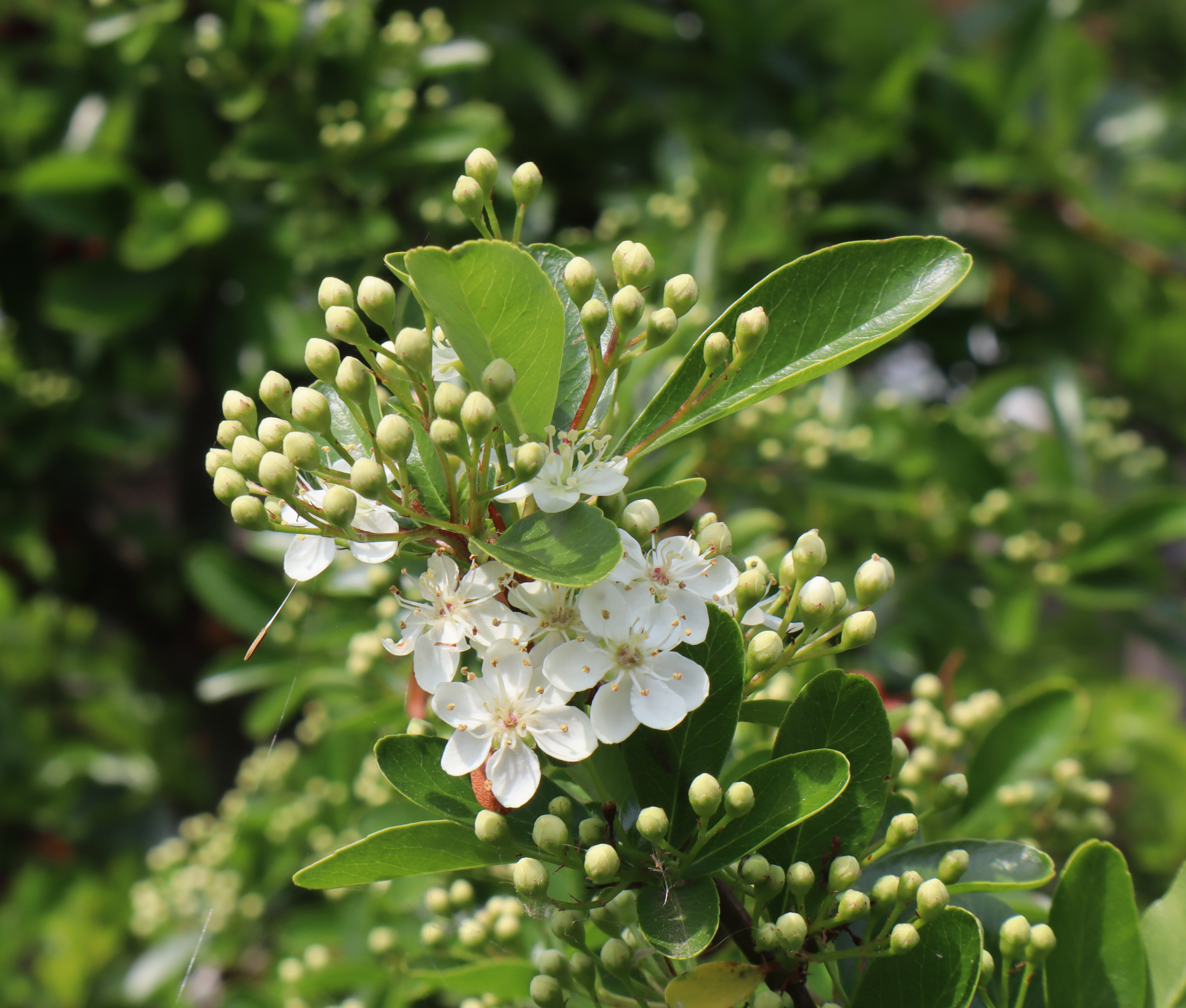

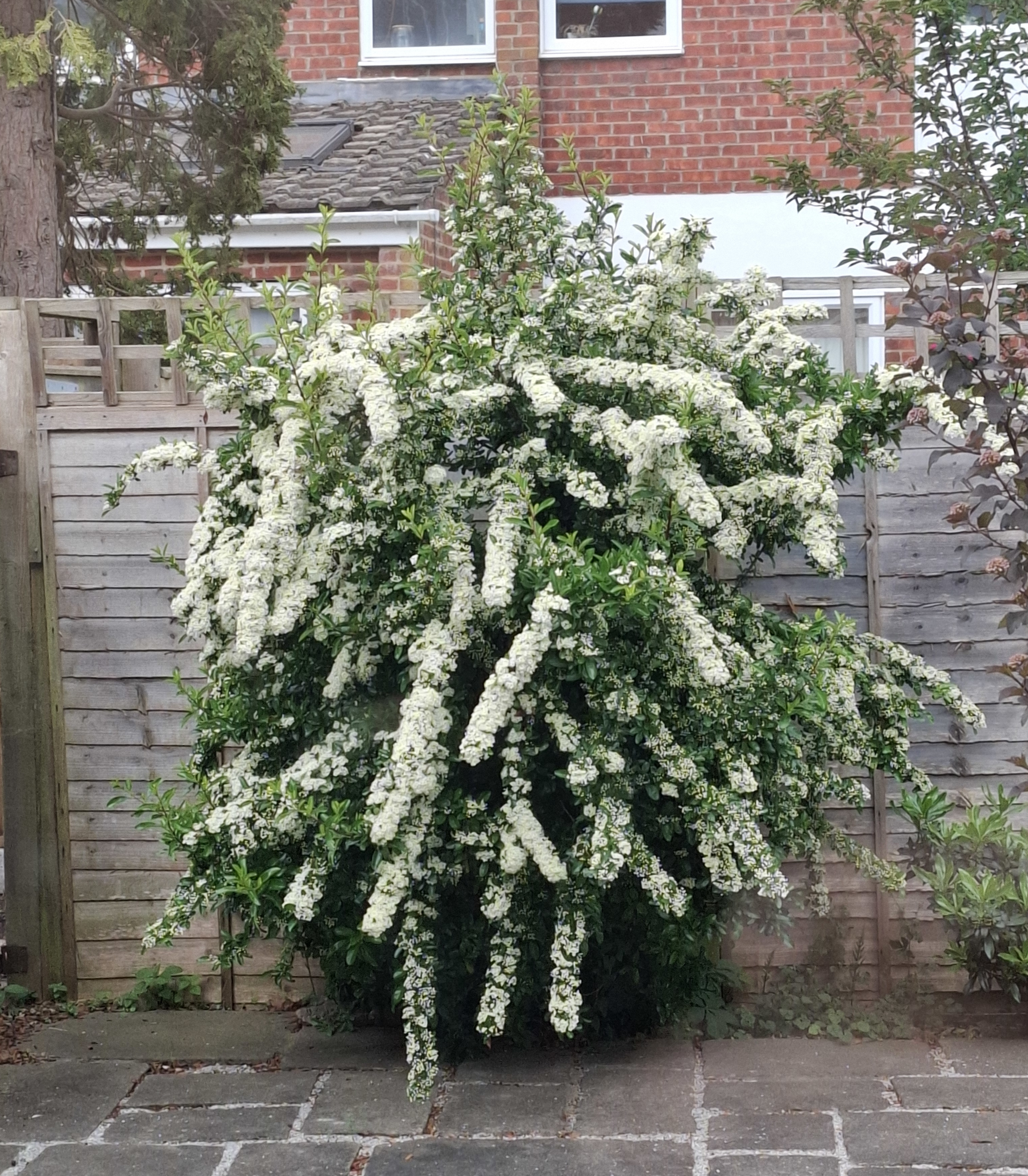

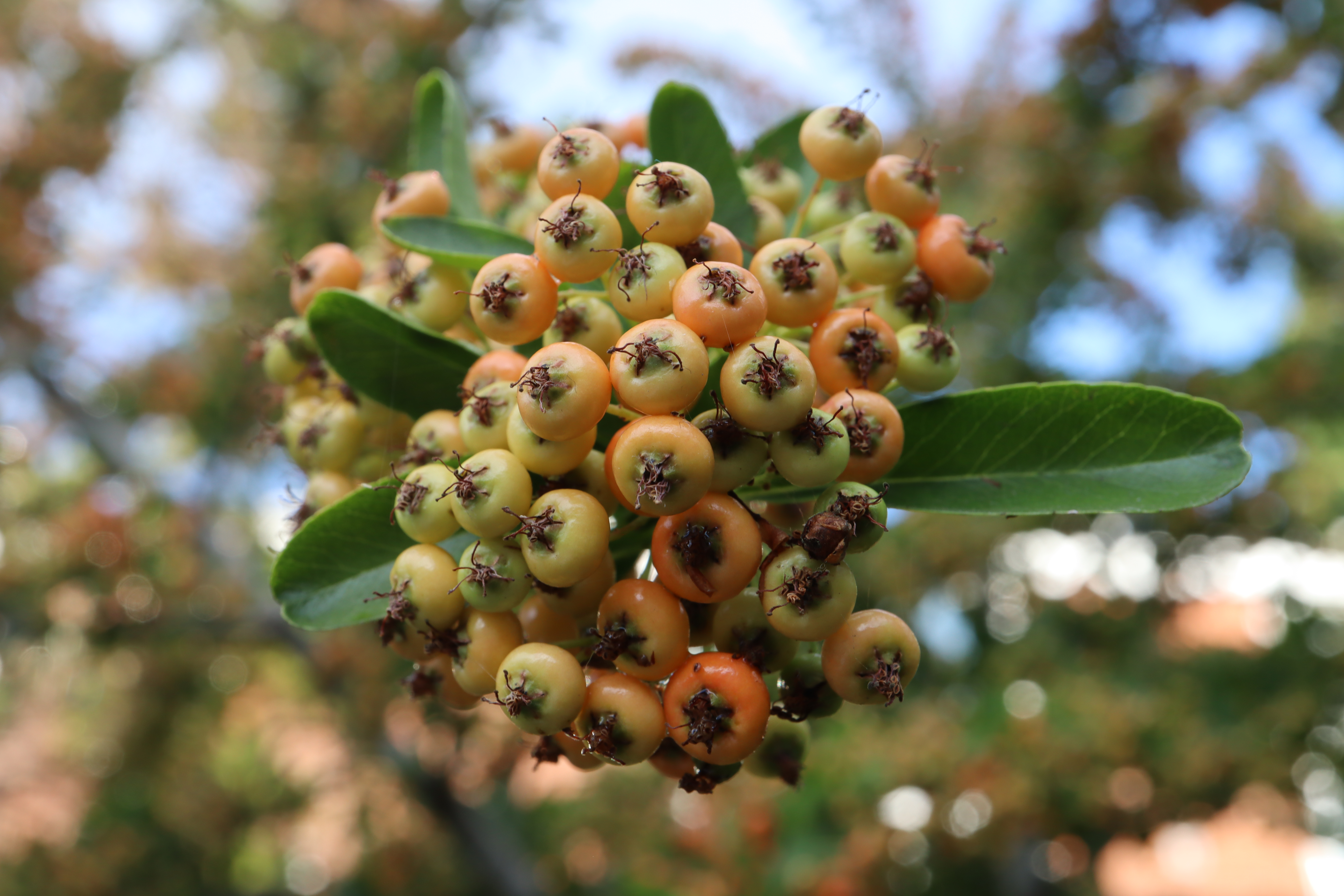

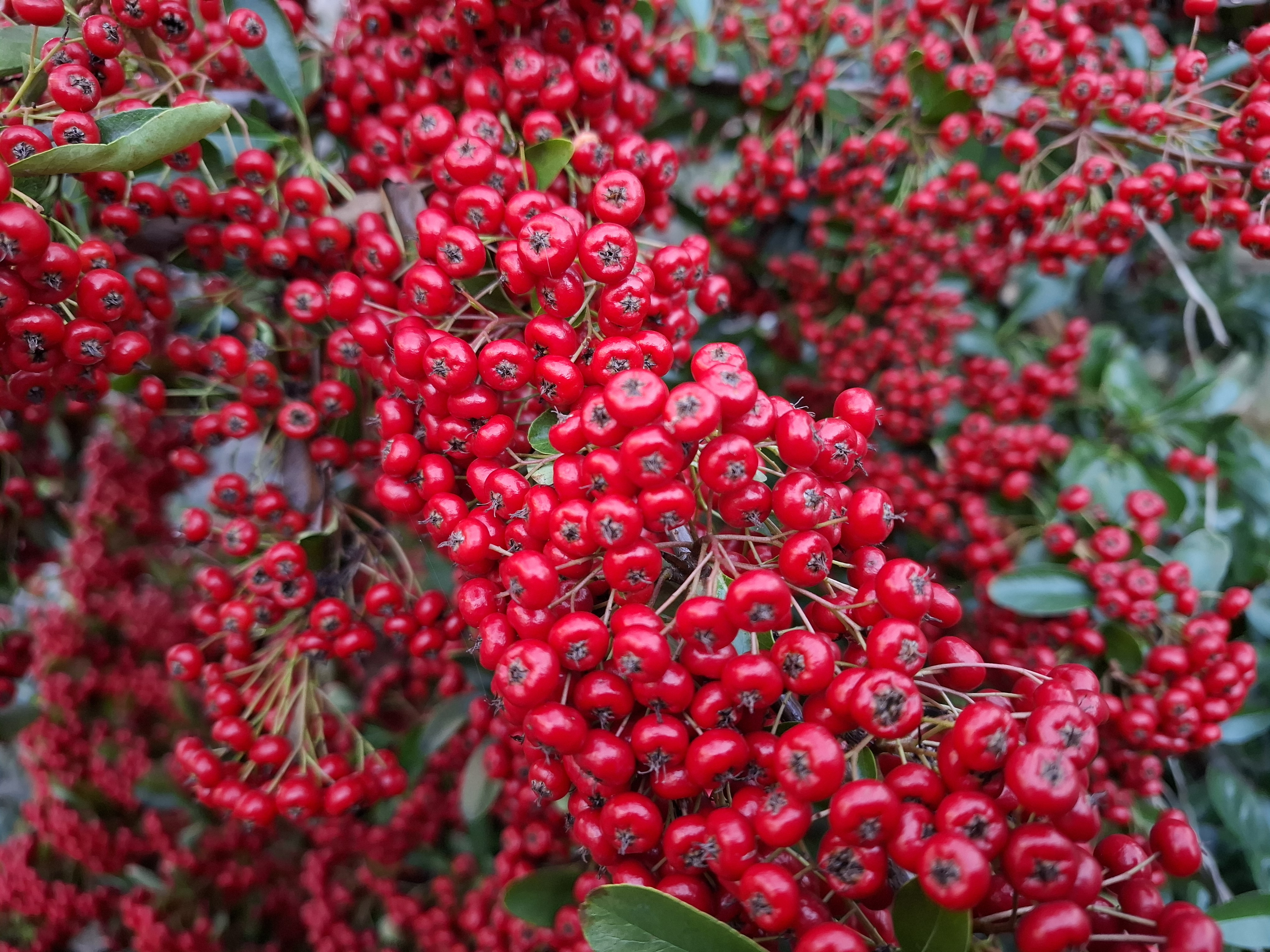
