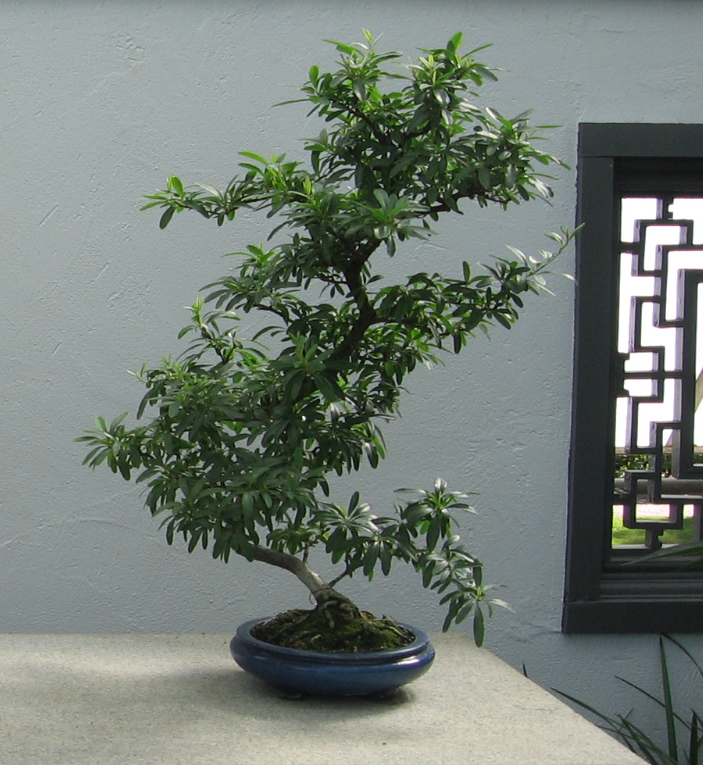
- Pyracantha crenulata grown as a bonsai

Scientific classification
- Kingdom: Plantae
- Clade: Tracheophytes
- Clade: Angiosperms
- Clade: Eudicots
- Clade: Rosids
- Order: Rosales
- Family: Rosaceae
- Genus: Pyracantha
- Species: P. crenulata

Binomial name
- Pyracantha crenulata (D.Don) M.Roem.

Synonyms
- List: Cotoneaster crenulatus (D.Don) K.Koch in Dendrologie 1: 175 (1869); Cotoneaster fortunei Wenz. in Linnaea 38: 200 (1874); Cotoneaster pyracantha E.Pritz. in Bot. Jahrb. Syst. 29: 386 (1900); Crataegus crenulata (D.Don) Roxb. in Fl. Ind., ed. 1832. 2: 509 (1832); Crataegus pyracantha Hemsl. in J. Linn. Soc., Bot. 23: 260 (1887); Crataegus pyracantha Brandis in Forest Fl. N.W. India: 208 (1874); Crataegus pyracantha var. crenulata (D.Don) Loudon in Arbor. Frutic. Brit. 2: 844 (1838); Mespilus crenulata D.Don in Prodr. Fl. Nepal.: 238 (1825); Mespilus loureiroi Kostel. in Allg. Med.-Pharm. Fl. 4: 1479 (1835); Mespilus pyracantha Lour. in Fl. Cochinch.: 320 (1790), sensu auct.; Osteomeles pyracantha Decne. in Nouv. Arch. Mus. Hist. Nat. 10: 182 (1874); Photinia crenatoserrata Hance in J. Bot. 18: 261 (1880); Photinia fortuneana Maxim. in Bull. Acad. Imp. Sci. Saint-Pétersbourg, sér. 3, 19: 179 (1873); Pyracantha atalantioides (Hance) Stapf in Bot. Mag. 151: t. 9099 (1926); Pyracantha chinensis M.Roem. in Fam. Nat. Syn. Monogr. 3: 220 (1847); Pyracantha crenatoserrata (Hance) Rehder in J. Arnold Arbor. 12: 72 (1931); Pyracantha crenulata C.K.Schneid. in Ill. Handb. Laubholzk. 1: 761 (1906); Pyracantha crenulata var. emarginata J.E.Vidal in Notul. Syst. (Paris) 13: 301 (1948 publ. 1949); Pyracantha crenulata f. flava Anon. in Gard. Chron., ser. 3, 67: 55 (1920); Pyracantha crenulata flava (Anon.) Meun. in Rev. Hort. (Paris) 97: 573 (1925); Pyracantha crenulata var. kansuensis Rehder in J. Arnold Arbor. 4: 114 (1923); Pyracantha crenulata var. rogersiana A.B.Jacks. in Gard. Chron., ser. 3, 60: 309 (1916); Pyracantha crenulata var. yunnanensis M.Vilm. ex Mottet in Rev. Hort. (Paris) 85: 204 (1913); Pyracantha discolor Rehder in J. Arnold Arbor. 1: 260 (1920); Pyracantha fortuneana (Maxim.) H.L.Li in J. Arnold Arbor. 25: 420 (1944); Pyracantha gibbsii A.B.Jacks. in Gard. Chron., ser. 3, 60: 309 (1916); Pyracantha gibbsii var. yunnanensis Osborn in Garden (London, 1871–1927) 83: 138 (1919); Pyracantha loureiroi (Kostel.) Merr. in Trans. Amer. Philos. Soc., n.s., 24(2): 178 (1935); Pyracantha rogersiana (A.B.Jacks.) Bean in Garden (London, 1871–1927) 85: 567 (1921); Pyracantha rogersiana f. aurantiaca Anon. in J. Roy. Hort. Soc. 67: 60 (1942); Pyracantha rogersiana f. flava Anon. in J. Roy. Hort. Soc. 45(2-3): cxiii (1920); Pyracantha yunnanensis (M.Vilm. ex Mottet) Chitt. in Gard. Chron., ser. 3, 70: 325 (1921); Sportella atalantioides Hance in J. Bot. 15: 207 (1877)

= Pyracantha crenulata =

Species of flowering plant

Pyracantha crenulata, the Nepalese firethorn, Nepal firethorn or Himalayan firethorn, is a species of firethorn. The native range of this shrub species stretches from northern Pakistan to northwestern India and China.

== Description ==
Pyracantha crenulata is a deciduous, bushy and profusely branched and very thorny shrub. It grows up to 2.4–3.0 m (7 ft 10.5 in – 9 ft 10.1 in) tall. It has dark brown stem bark which becomes glabrous (hairless) when mature. It has dark green leaves, with a smooth exterior. They are 2.5–4.0 cm (1.0–1.6 in) long and 1.0–2.2 cm (0.4–0.9 in) wide with a tapering end. Flowering takes place between April and May. The flowers are hermaphrodite (bisexual), the white inflorescence is a compound corymb composed of many flowers. The flowers have 20 stamens and one ovary in the centre. Every flower has five sepals and five petals. The fruits ripen between June and September, with orange-red to dark red berry-like fruits. The berries are small, and each berry weighs about 250 mg. Each berry generally contains five triangular shaped and brown-colored seeds. There are sometimes three or four seeds per berry and the seeds are covered with a hard seed coat.

== Taxonomy ==
It is locally named as Ghingharu (घिंगारू) in Kumaon region of Uttarakhand, India.

It was first published in Fam. Nat. Syn. Monogr. 3: 220 in 1847.

== Distribution ==
It is a native species to the countries (and regions) of; Assam, China, East and West Himalayas, India, Myanmar, Nepal, Pakistan, Tibet and Vietnam.

It has been introduced into: United States (within the states of Alabama, California, Florida, Georgia, Louisiana, North Carolina, Oregon, South Carolina, Texas and Washington), South America (in north-eastern Argentina and Guatemala), Europe (Spain), South Africa (within Free State, Lesotho and Northern Provinces), Australia (in New South Wales) and north and south New Zealand.

== Habitat ==
Pyracantha crenulata is found growing in barren, rocky, and dry grasslands. It is also found along streams on the bank of streams and tributaries, in shrubberies, on open slopes, in cultivated areas and along roadsides.

On the Himalayan hills of Uttarakhand, it grows in areas at an altitude of 900–1,200 m (3,000–3,900 ft) above sea level, within Pine and Quercus forests (Osmastan 1926).

== Uses ==
It is cultivated as an ornamental plant. The leaves are used to make herbal tea. The wood can be used to make walking sticks. The pome fruit is orange-red and are food for birds.

The plant is used in the Himalayas within herbal drugs and is usually collected from forest areas for therapeutic arrangements, such as brews of dehydrated fruits, fluid sources, and making tinctures. P. crenulate has been shown to help in the treatment of heart failure, cardiac issues, and hypertension. When eaten with yogurt, the berries of the shrub help patients recover from dysentery (Singh et al. 2012).

It is also used for cultivation (in the Himalayas) near the boundaries of farming areas to stop soil erosion happening during the monsoon season due to its good soil binder capacity (via the roots) and it is used to prevent the entrance of wild animals (thorny bushes) into farming fields of vegetables and cereals.

== Gallery ==
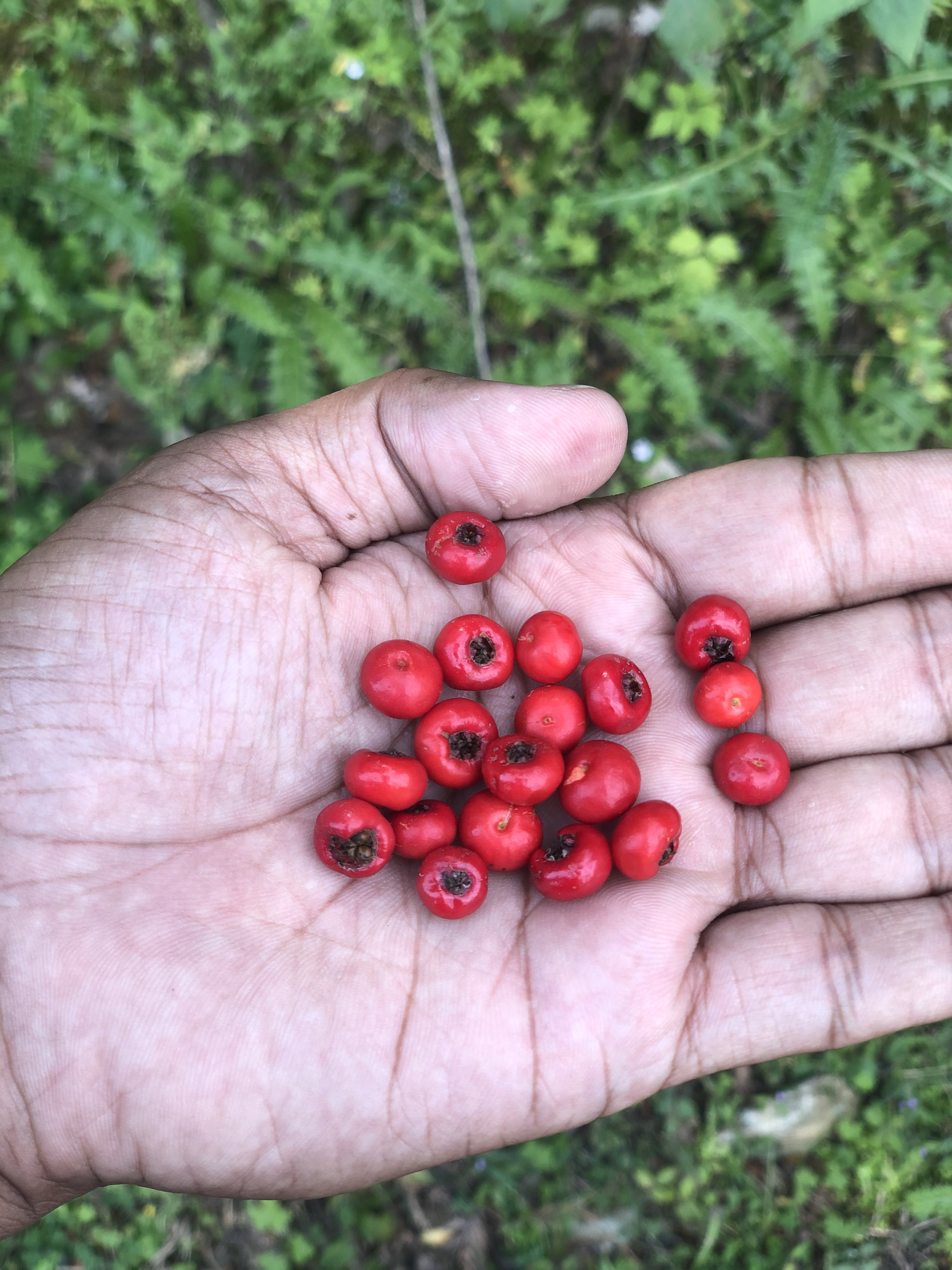
Pyracantha crenulata (Ghingharu) Berries

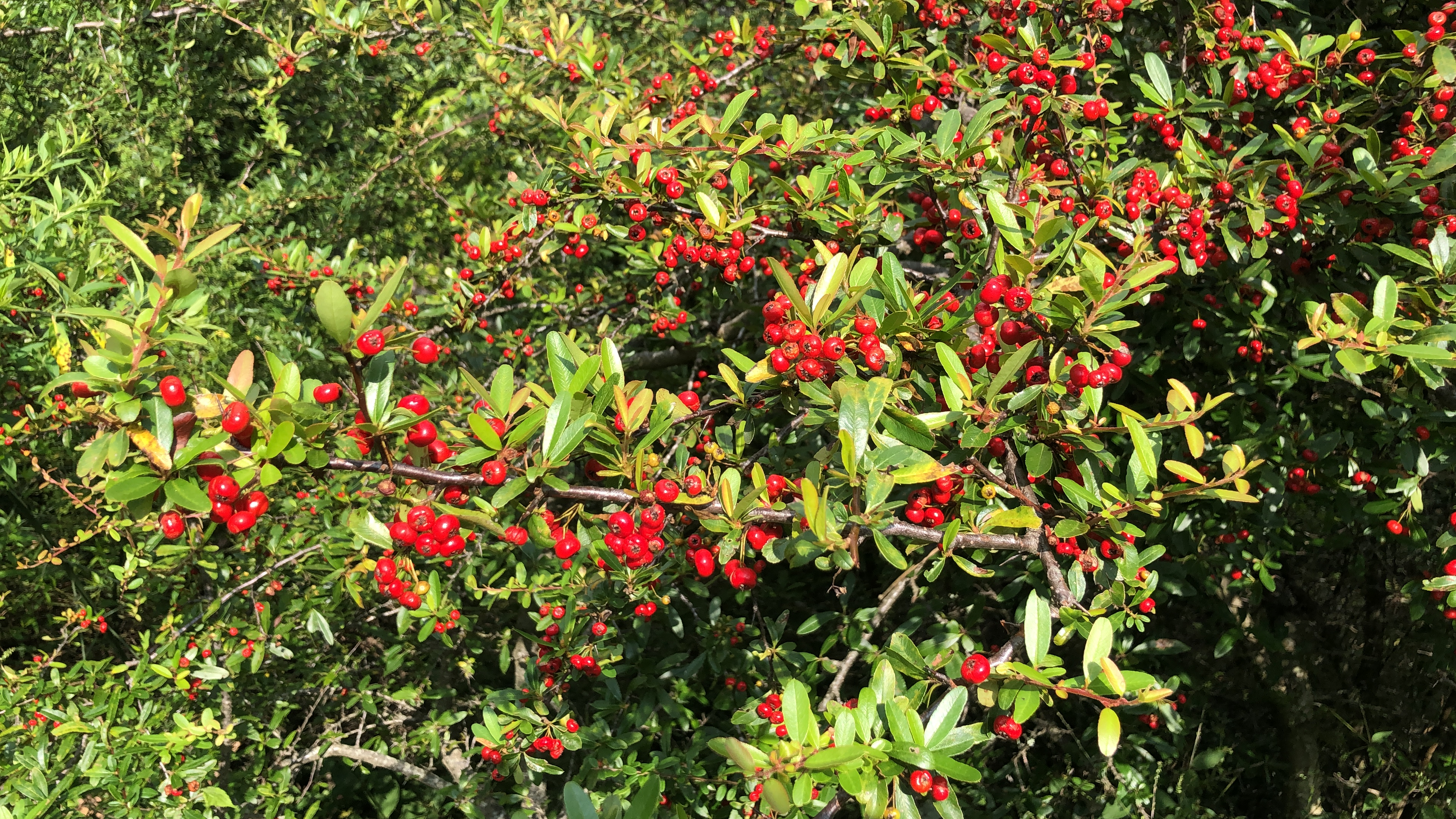
Pyracantha crenulata Plant near Dwarahat, Kumaon Uttarakhand

== Other sources ==
- Guglani A., Rajeshwar K., Arya K., Pandey H.K., Singh A.K., Bisht D. Variation in antioxidant activity and phyto-constituents in different parts of Pyracantha crenulata collected from middle hill climatic condition of Western Himalayas. Nat. Volatiles & Essent. Oils. 2021;8(4):12455-12468. 20.
- Saklani S., Chandra S., Mishra A.P. Evaluation of nutritional profile, medicinal value and qualitative estimation in different parts of Pyrus pashia, Ficus palmate and Pyracantha crenulata. J global trends pharmaceutical sci. 2011; 2 (3) : 350–354.
- Sati D.C. Pharmacognostical and phytochemical screening of leaf and fruit extract of Pyracantha crenulata. J pharmacogn phytochem. 2017; 6 (5): 2563–8.
- Saklani S., Chandra S. In-vitro antimicrobial activity nutritional value, antinutritional value and phytochemical screening of Pyracantha crenulata fruit. Int J Pharm Sci Rev Res. 2014; 26 (1) :1-5.
