= Pyracantha atalantioides =

Scientific classification
- Kingdom: Plantae
- Clade: Tracheophytes
- Clade: Angiosperms
- Clade: Eudicots
- Clade: Rosids
- Order: Rosales
- Family: Rosaceae
- Genus: Pyracantha
- Species: P. atalantioides

Binomial name
- Pyracantha atalantioides (Hance) Stapf

Synonyms
- Pyracantha gibbsii

Species of shrub

Pyracantha atalantioides (common names: Gigg's firethorn and Sichuan firethorn) is a species of Firethorn shrub.

== Description ==
Fully grown, the plant is 6 metres (20 ft) tall with its petioles being circa 2.5 millimetres (0.098 in). Its flowers are white and they bloom from March to June. Its small berry-shaped pome fruits are red. Its branches have long spines. It is grown in gardens and parks as an ornamental plant. They are also grown as hedges. It is sometimes used in bonsai.

== Distribution ==
The species originated from southern China but it has been introduced to North America and has been naturalised, especially in California.
