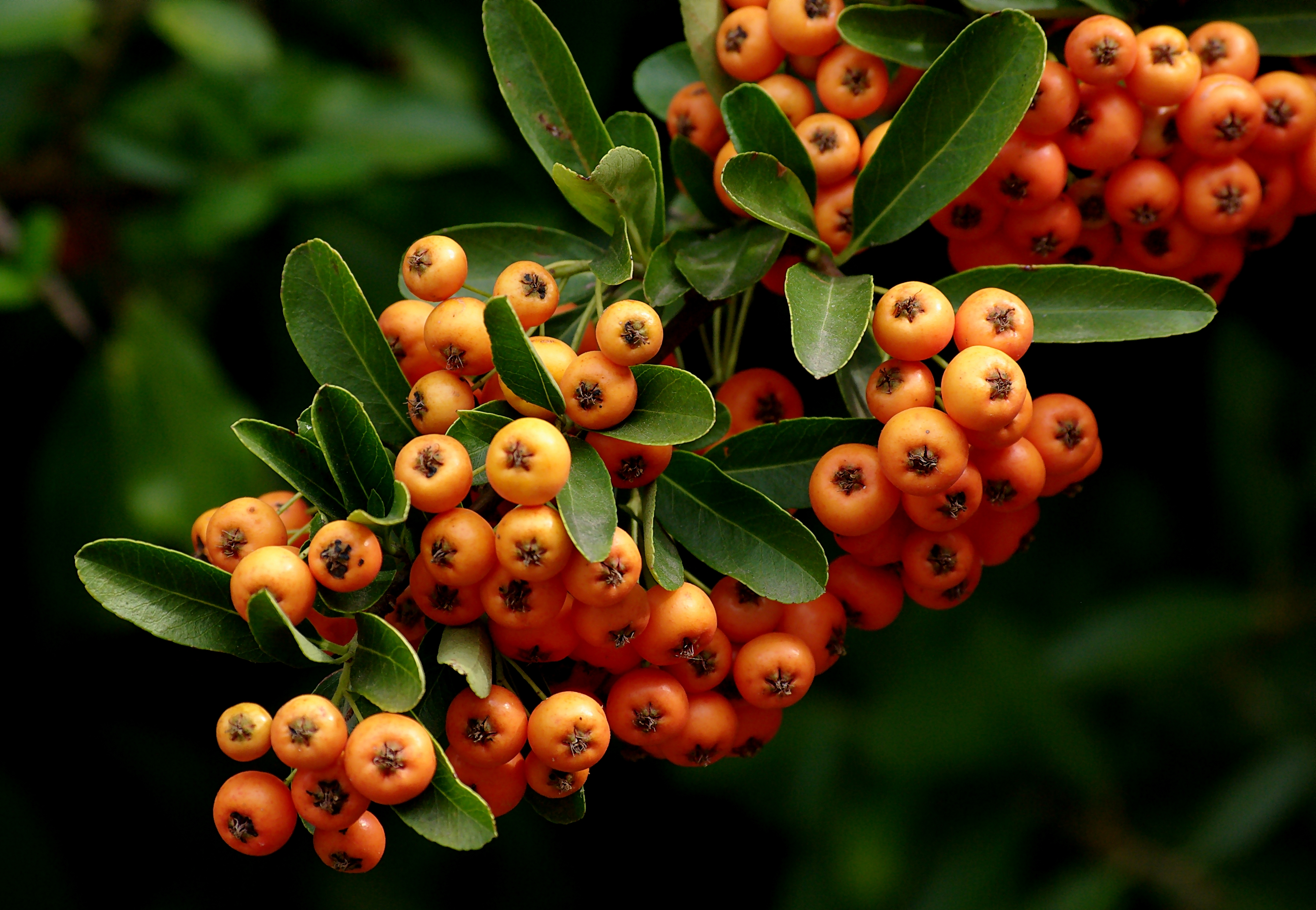

Scientific classification
- Kingdom: Plantae
- Clade: Tracheophytes
- Clade: Angiosperms
- Clade: Eudicots
- Clade: Rosids
- Order: Rosales
- Family: Rosaceae
- Genus: Pyracantha
- Species: P. angustifolia

Binomial name
- Pyracantha angustifolia (Franch.) C.K.Schneid.

Synonyms
- Cotoneaster angustifolius Franch.

= Pyracantha angustifolia =

Species of shrub

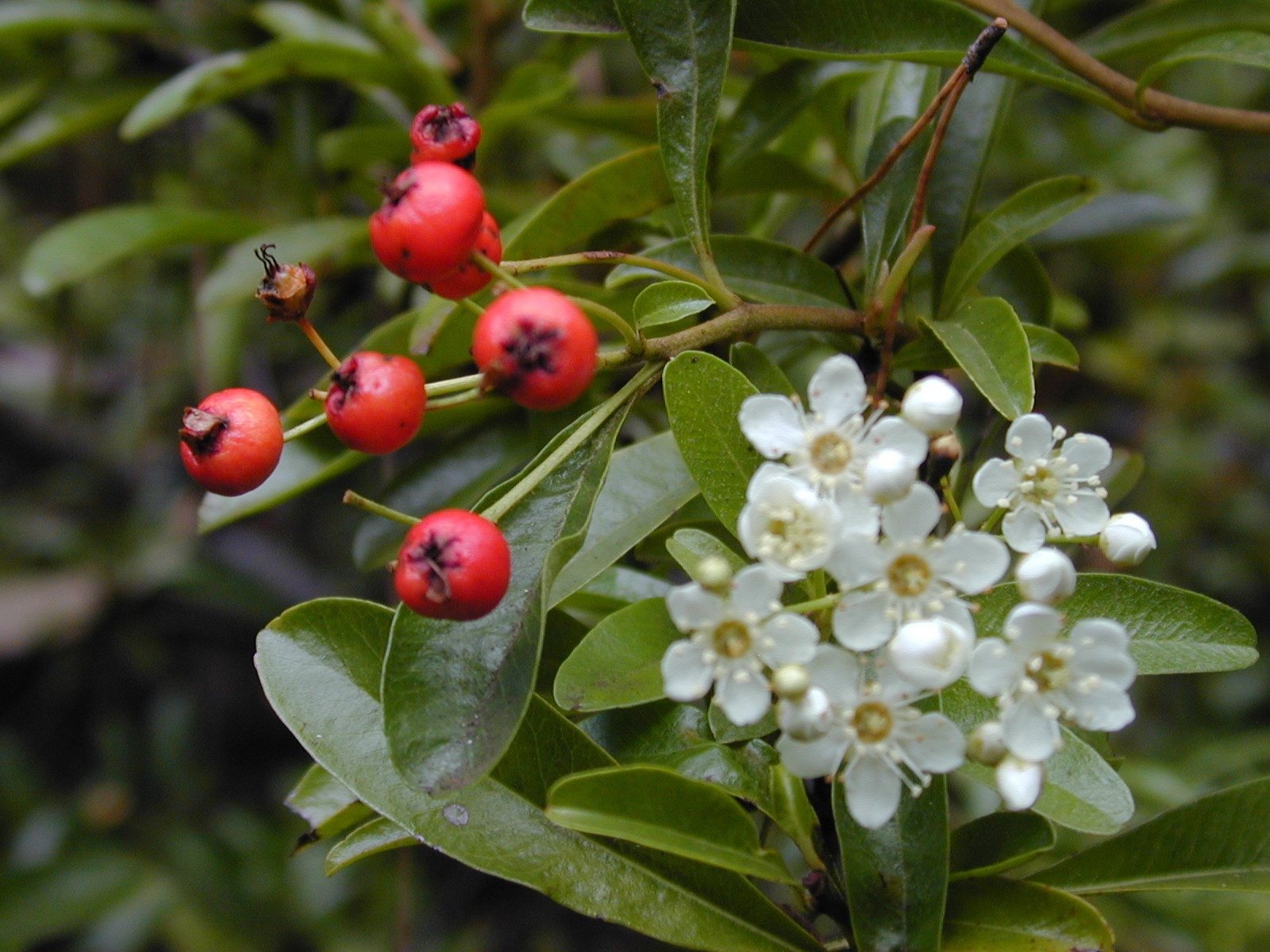
Pyracantha angustifolia: flowers and fruit

Pyracantha angustifolia is a species of shrub in the rose family known by the common names narrowleaf firethorn, slender firethorn and woolly firethorn. The flowers are white and produce small round pomes and can be orange to red in color. These fruits are astringent and bitter, making them inedible for humans, but they are a food source for birds. The leaves, fruit and seeds contain hydrogen cyanide, the source of the bitter taste. The stems and branches have sharp spines. This shrub is cultivated and grown in yards and gardens as an ornamental plant. It can be used to make hedges for home security. This species is native to China but has been introduced to North America and Australia. It is an invasive species in Hawaii and in other areas.
