= Pyracantha 'Cadrou' =

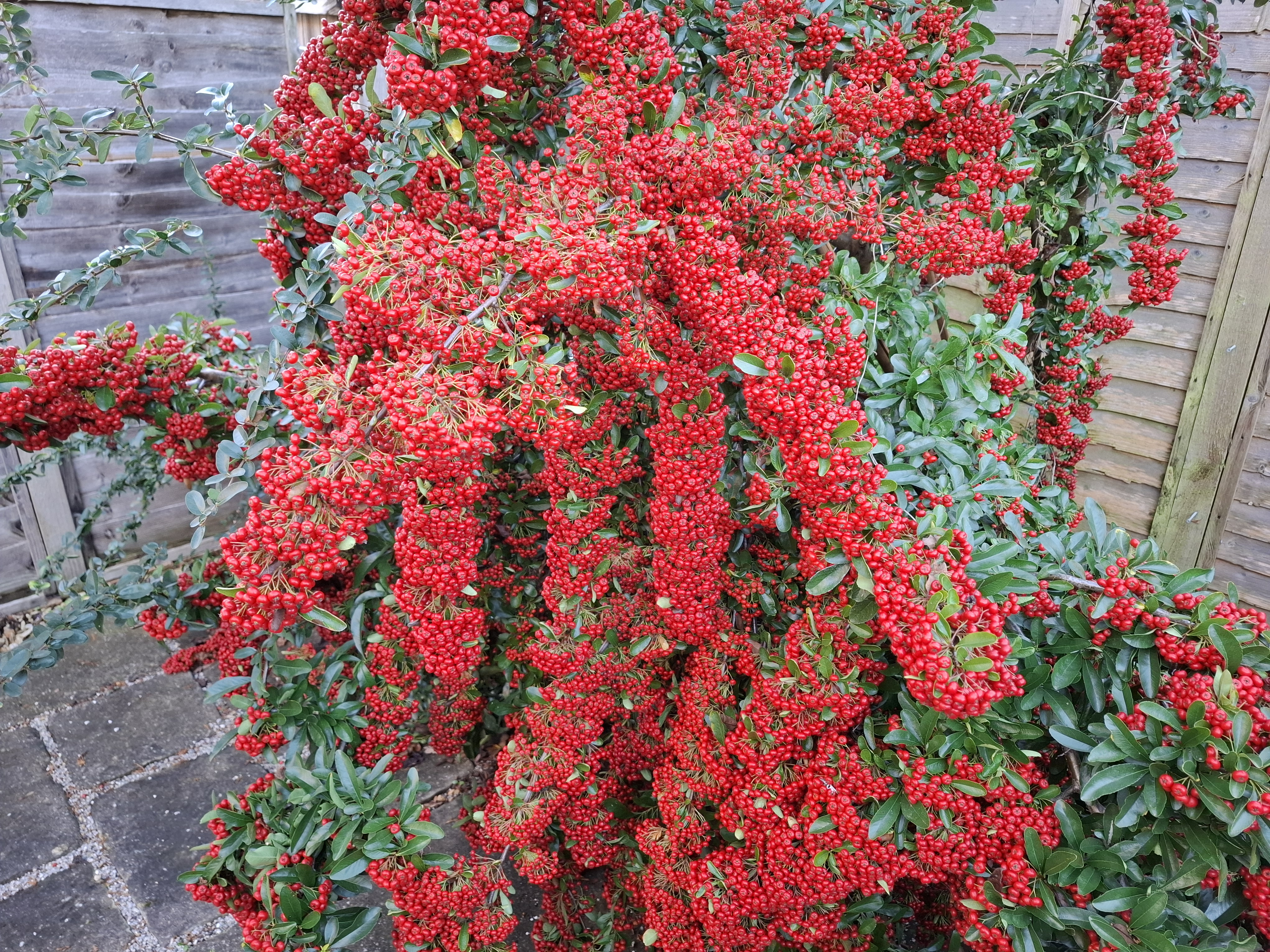
- Genus: Pyracantha
- Hybrid parentage: Pyracantha 'Shawnee' × Pyracantha atalantioides 'Mozart'
- Cultivar: 'Cadrou'
- Breeder: Joseph Belin, Alain Cadic
- Origin: France, 1982

Pyracantha 'Cadrou' is a cultivar in the genus Pyracantha. It is a hybrid of Pyracantha 'Shawnee' and Pyracantha atalantioides 'Mozart', created by controlled pollination in June 1982 at the Institut national de la recherche agronomique. Pyracantha 'Cadrou' is also marketed under the names Saphyr Rouge and Saphyr Red. In the United Kingdom, it has obtained the Royal Horticultural Society's Award of Garden Merit in 2002.

The fruits are abundant, flattened, and bright carmine red.

== Gallery ==
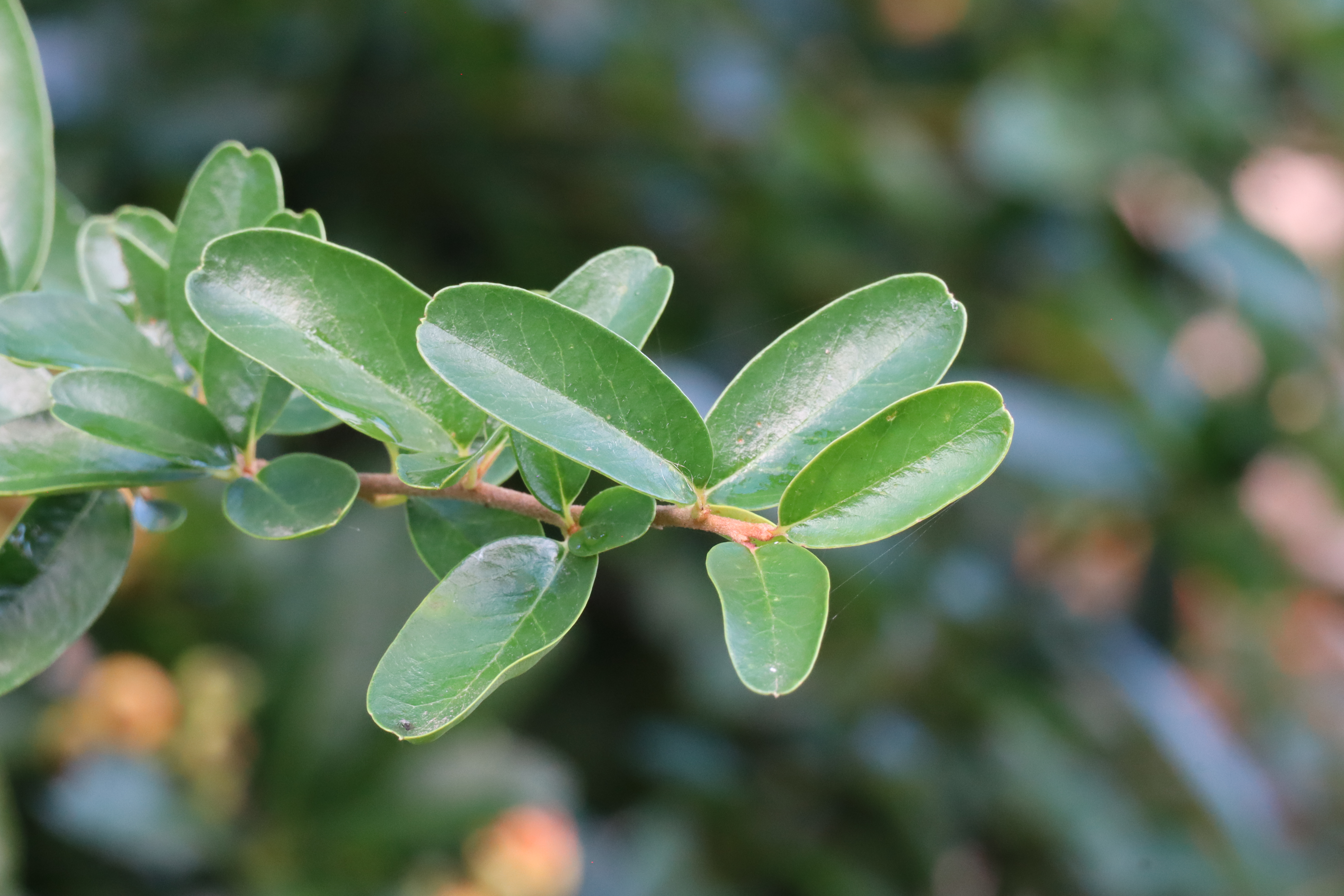

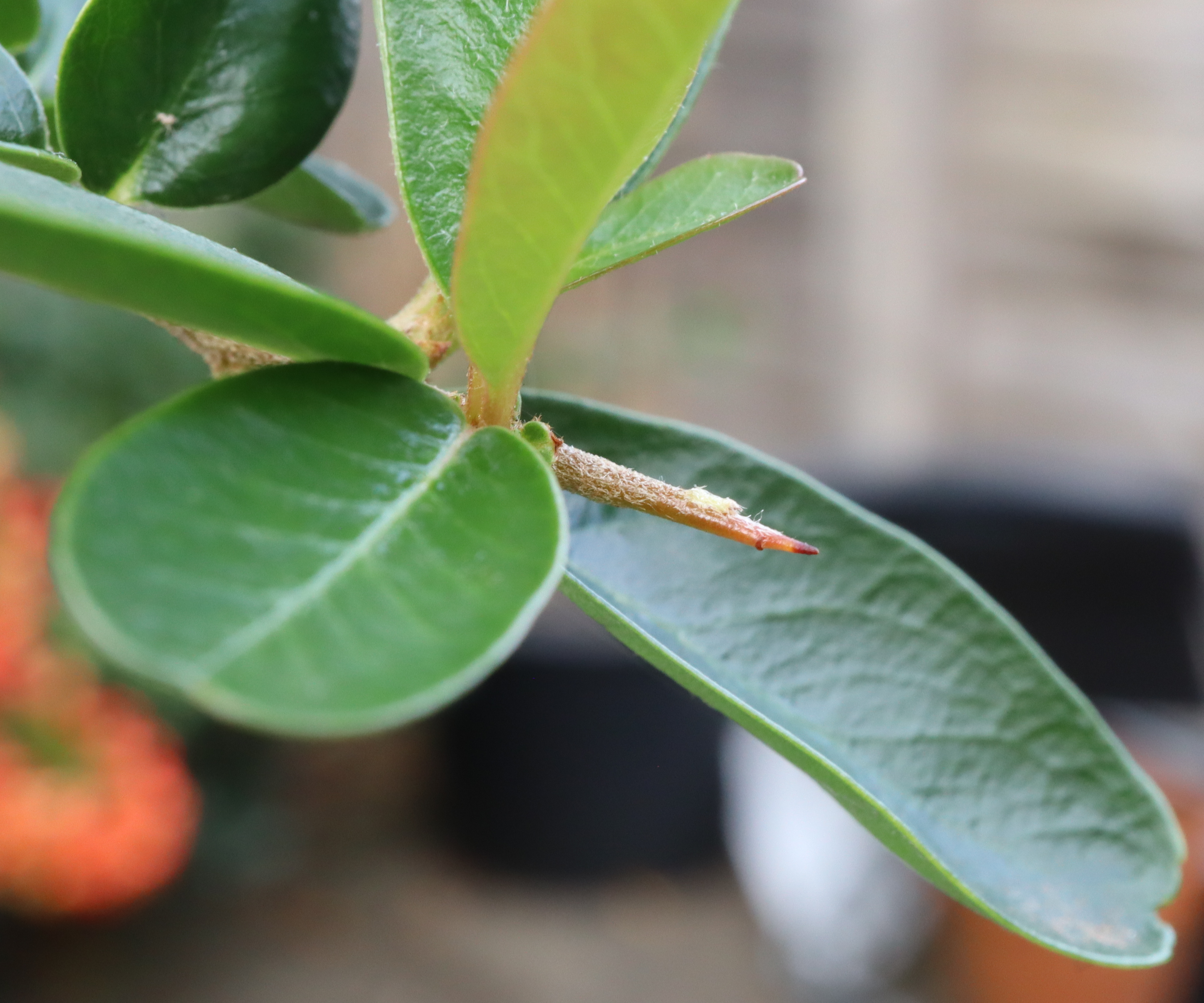

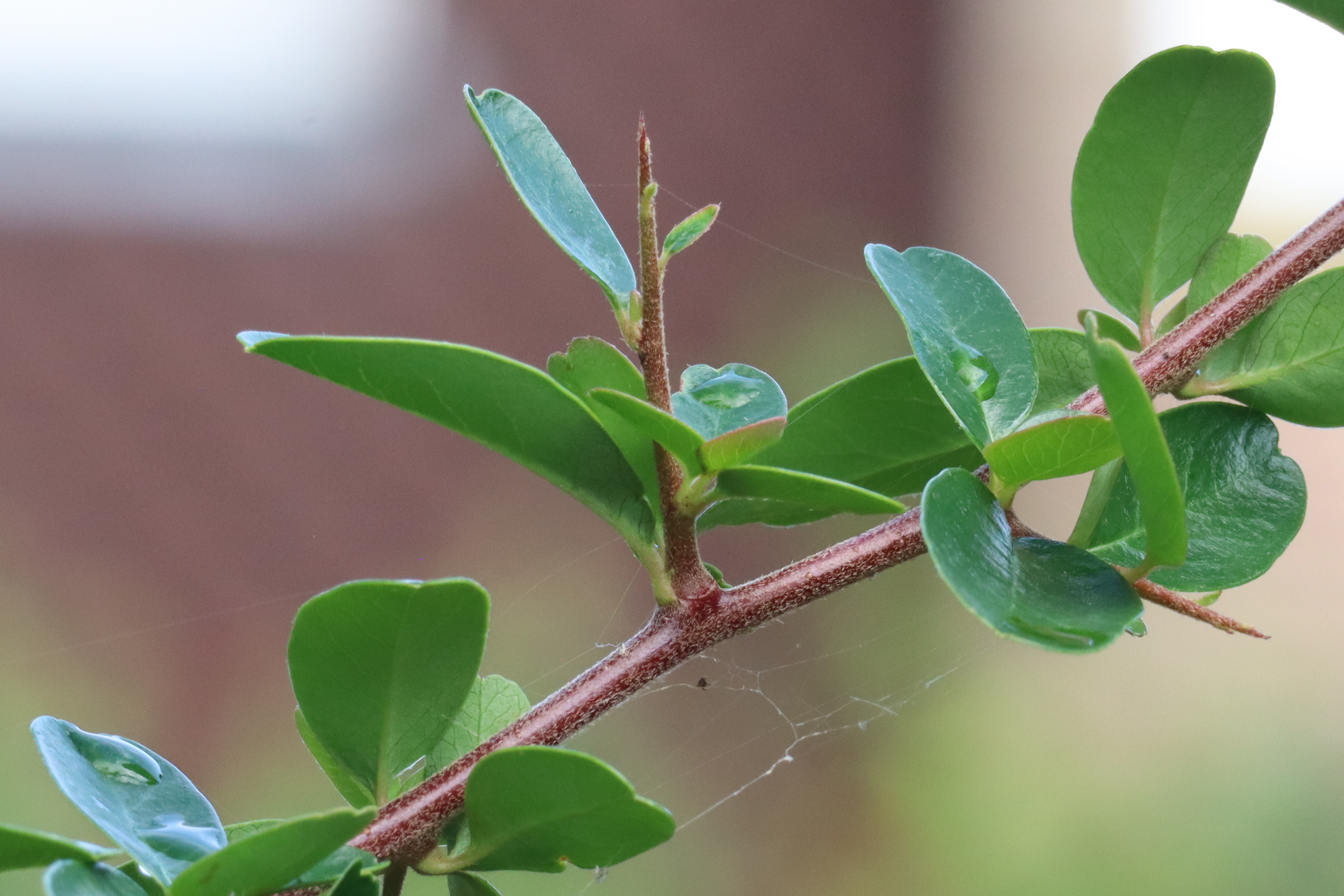

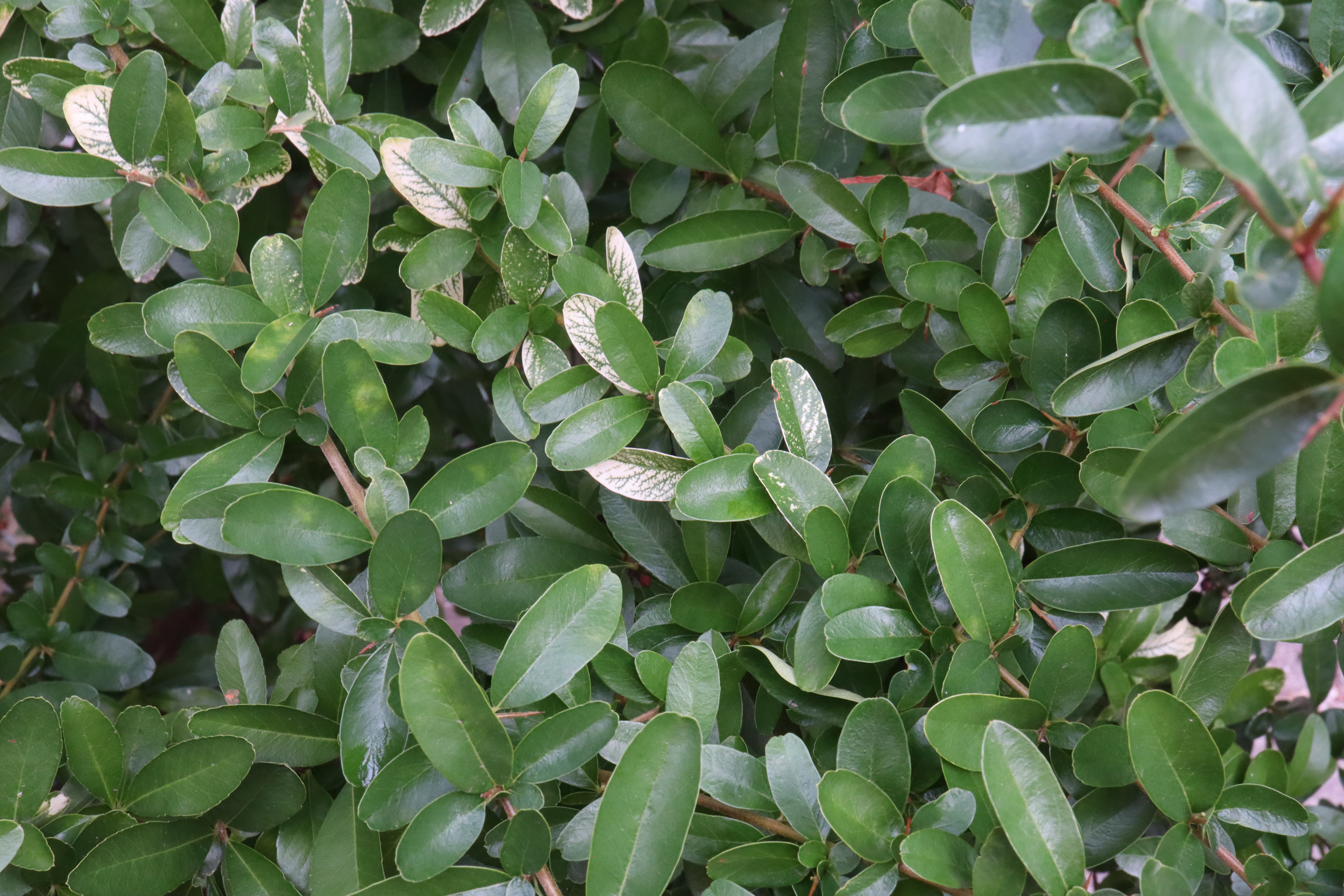

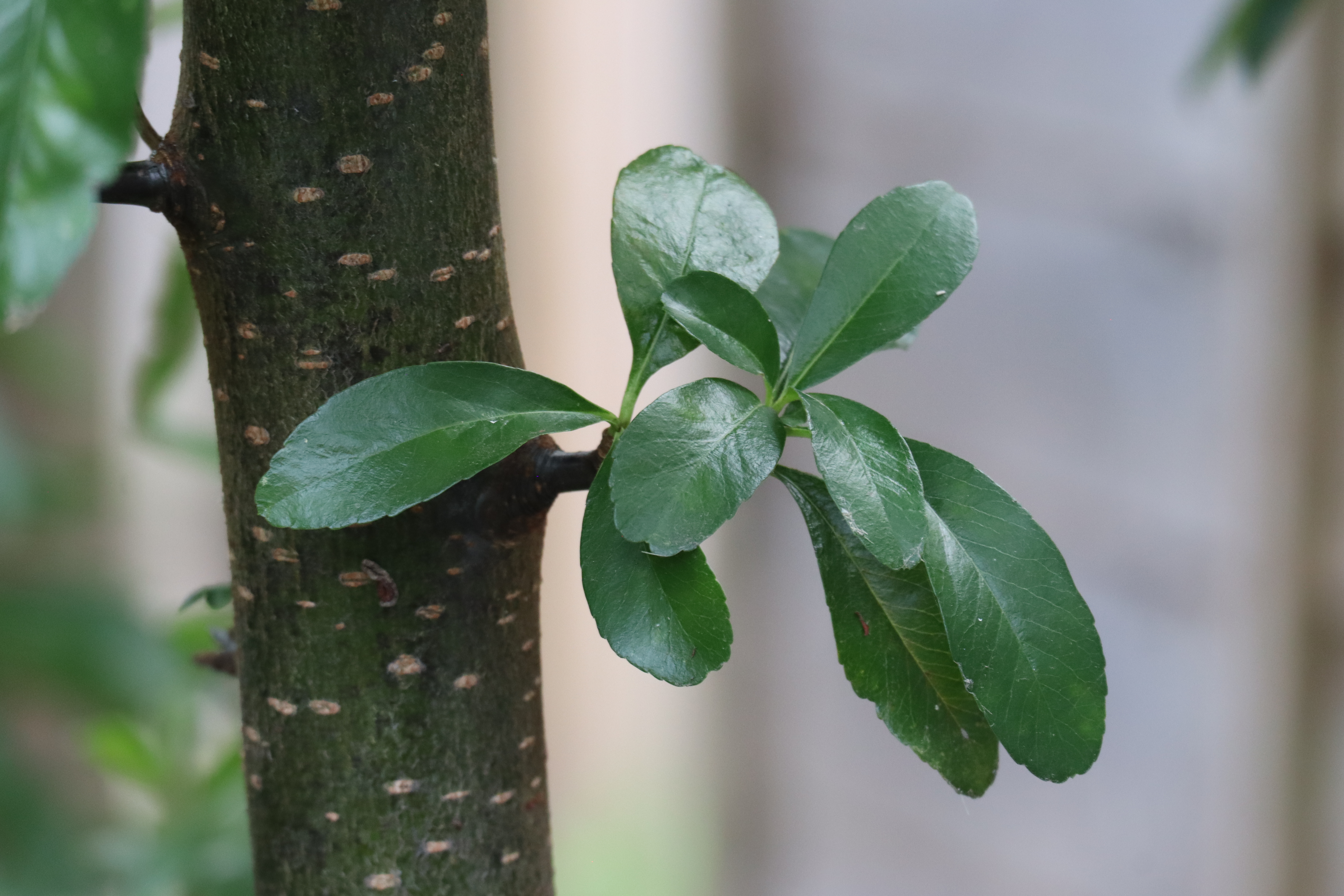

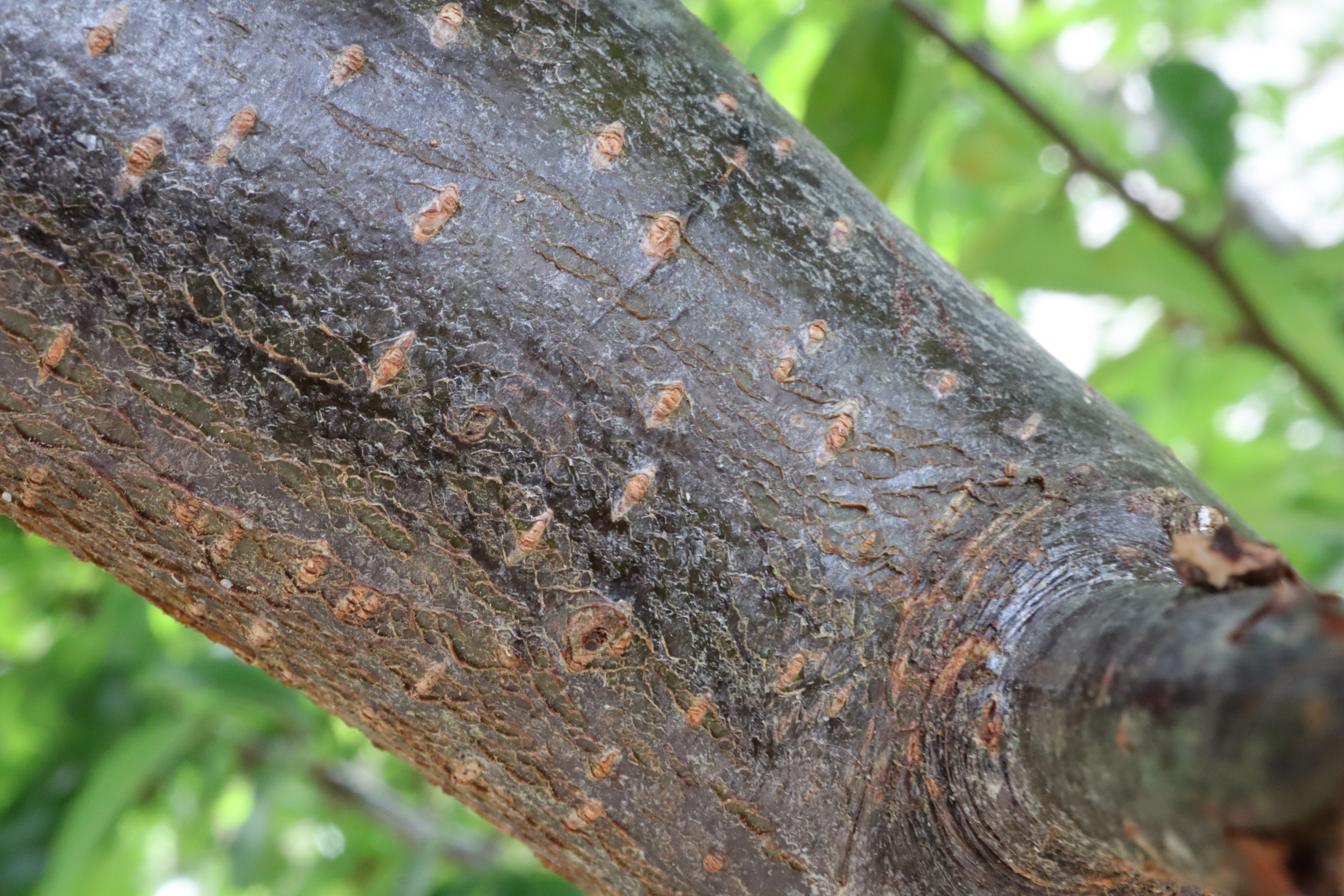

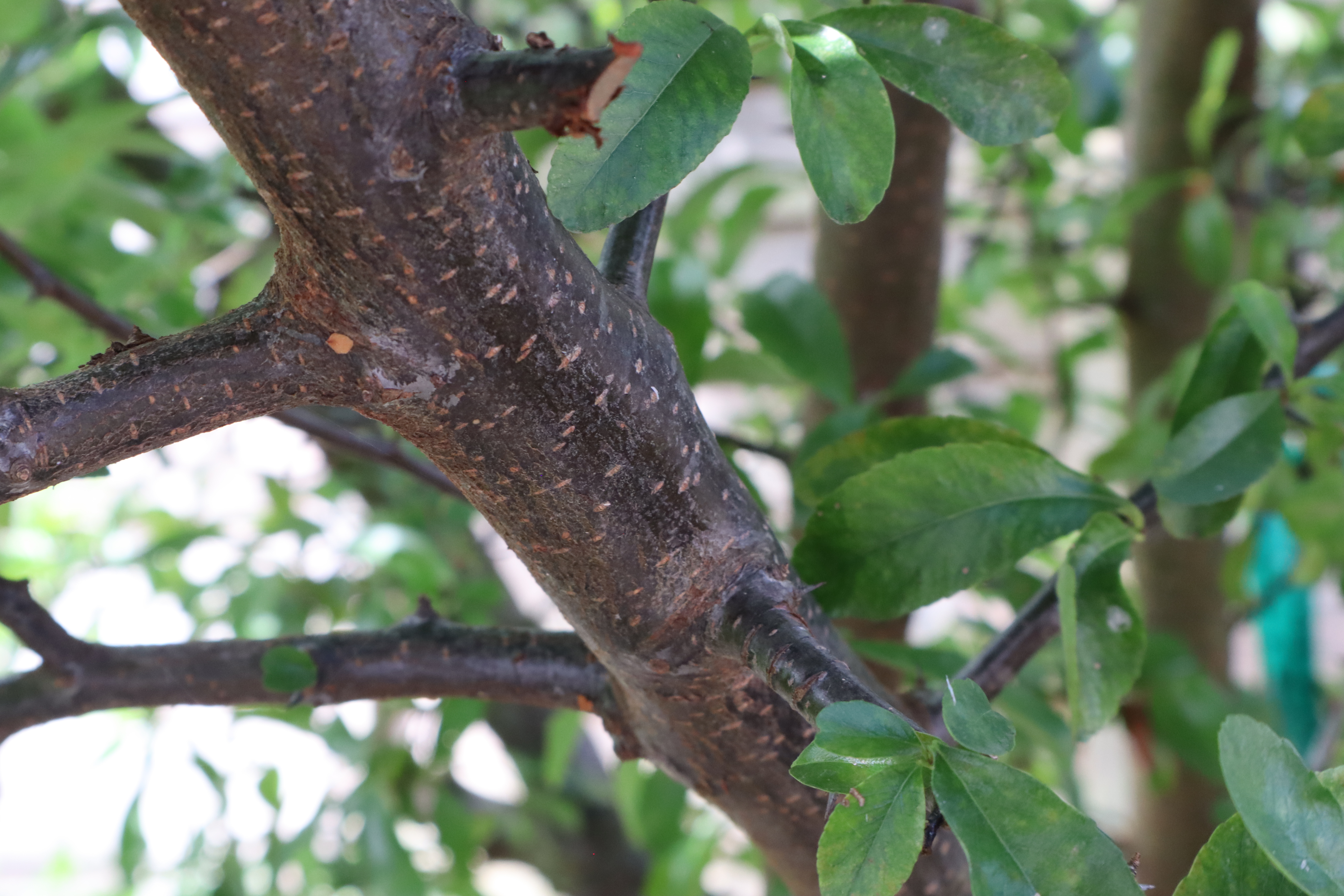

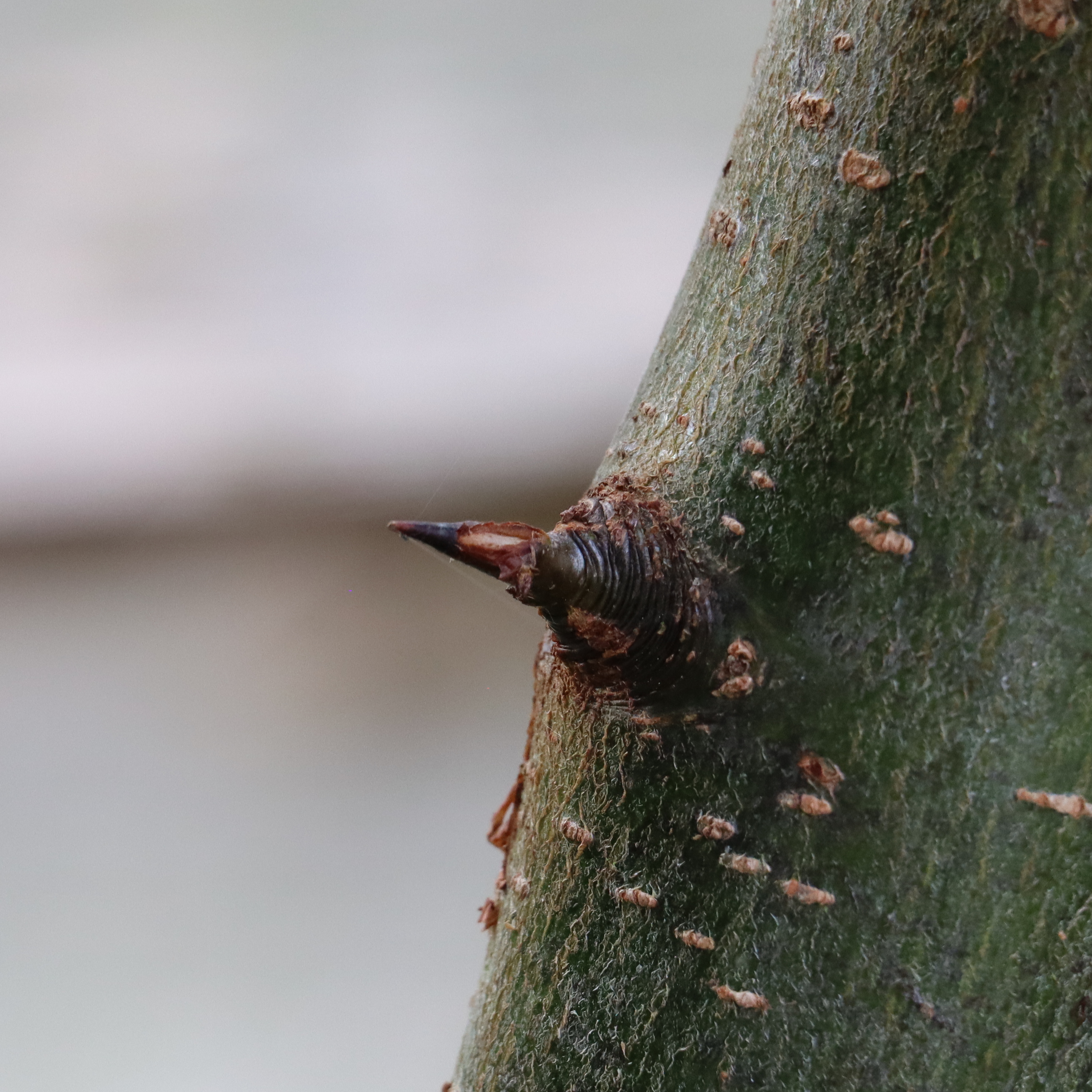

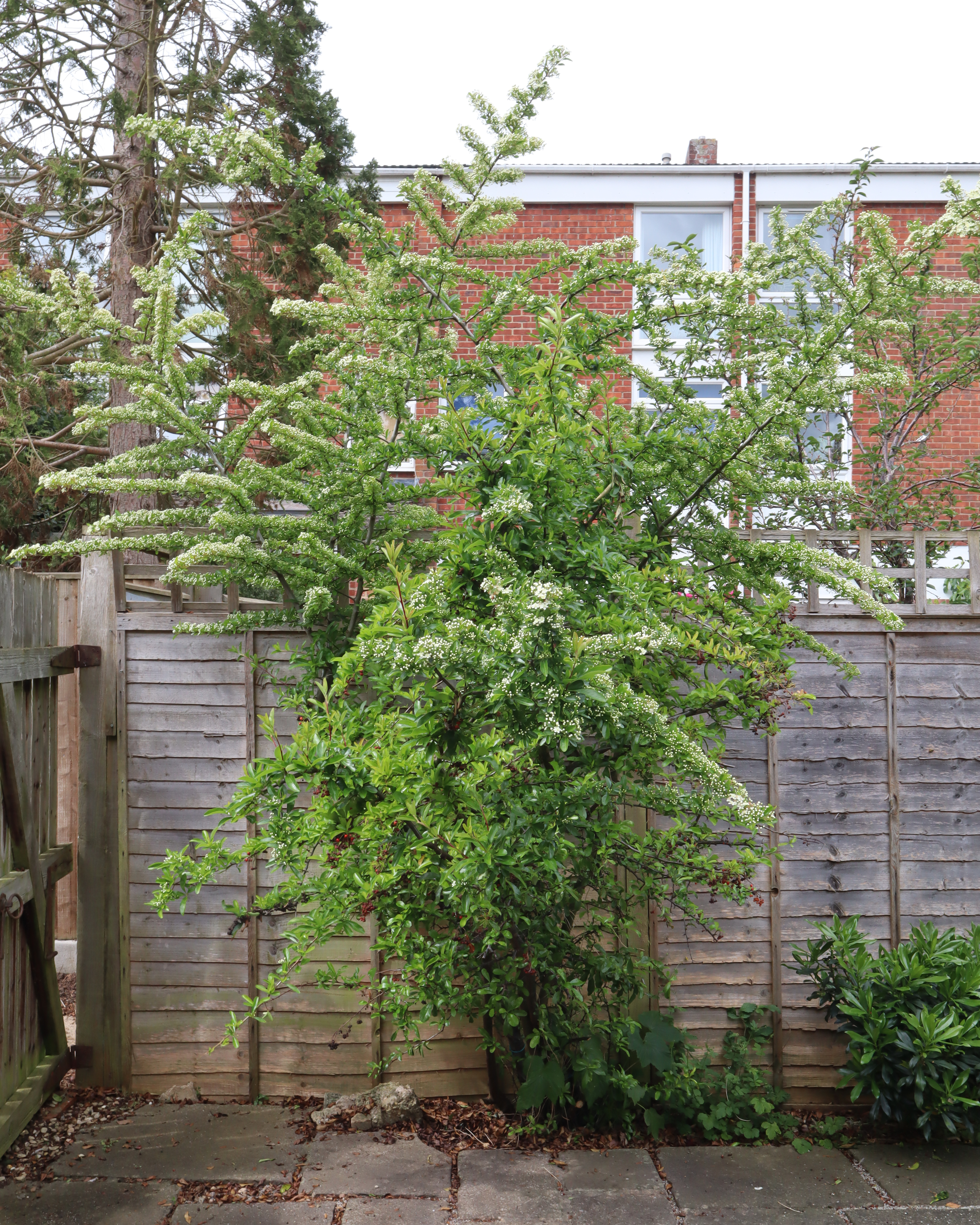

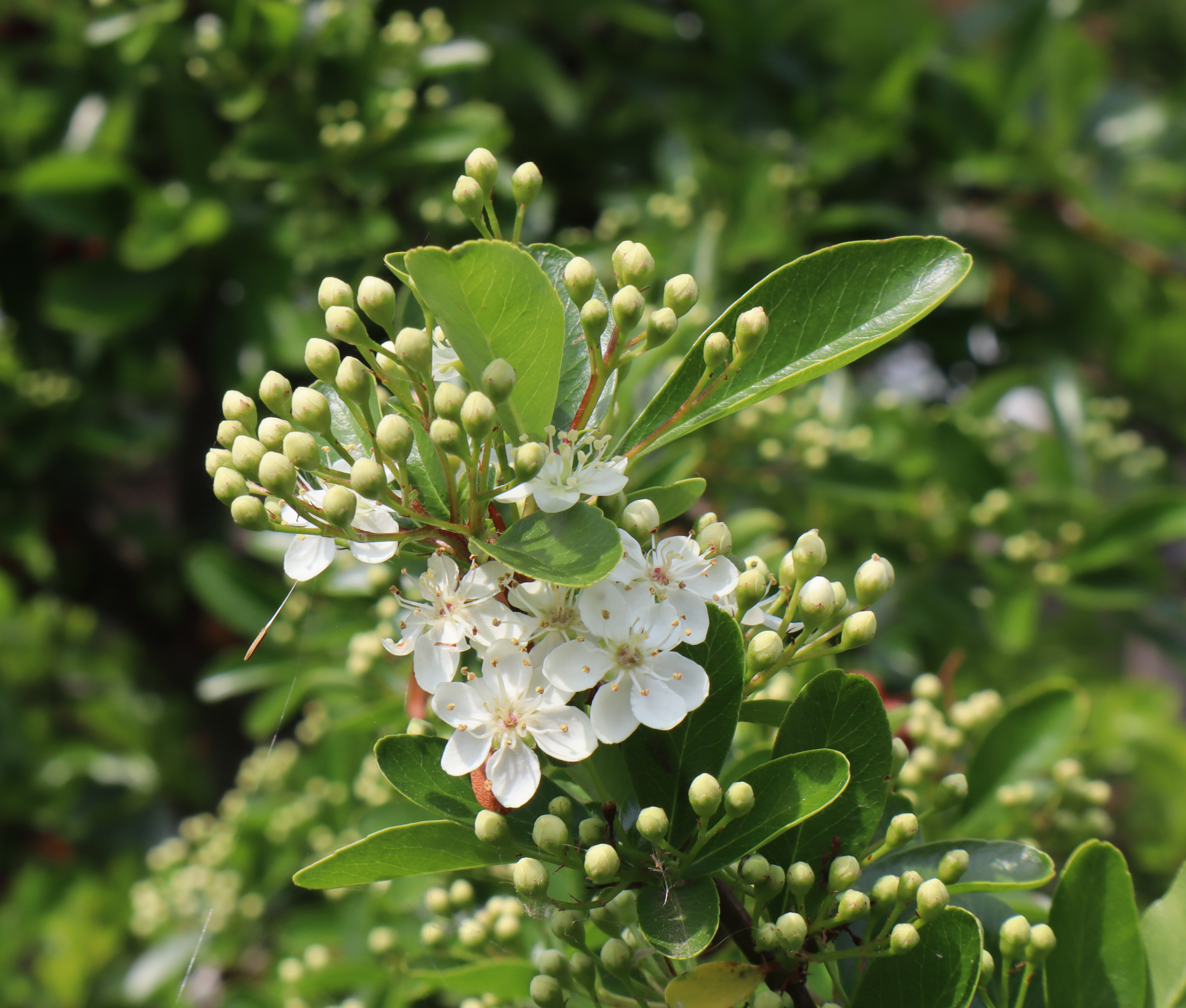

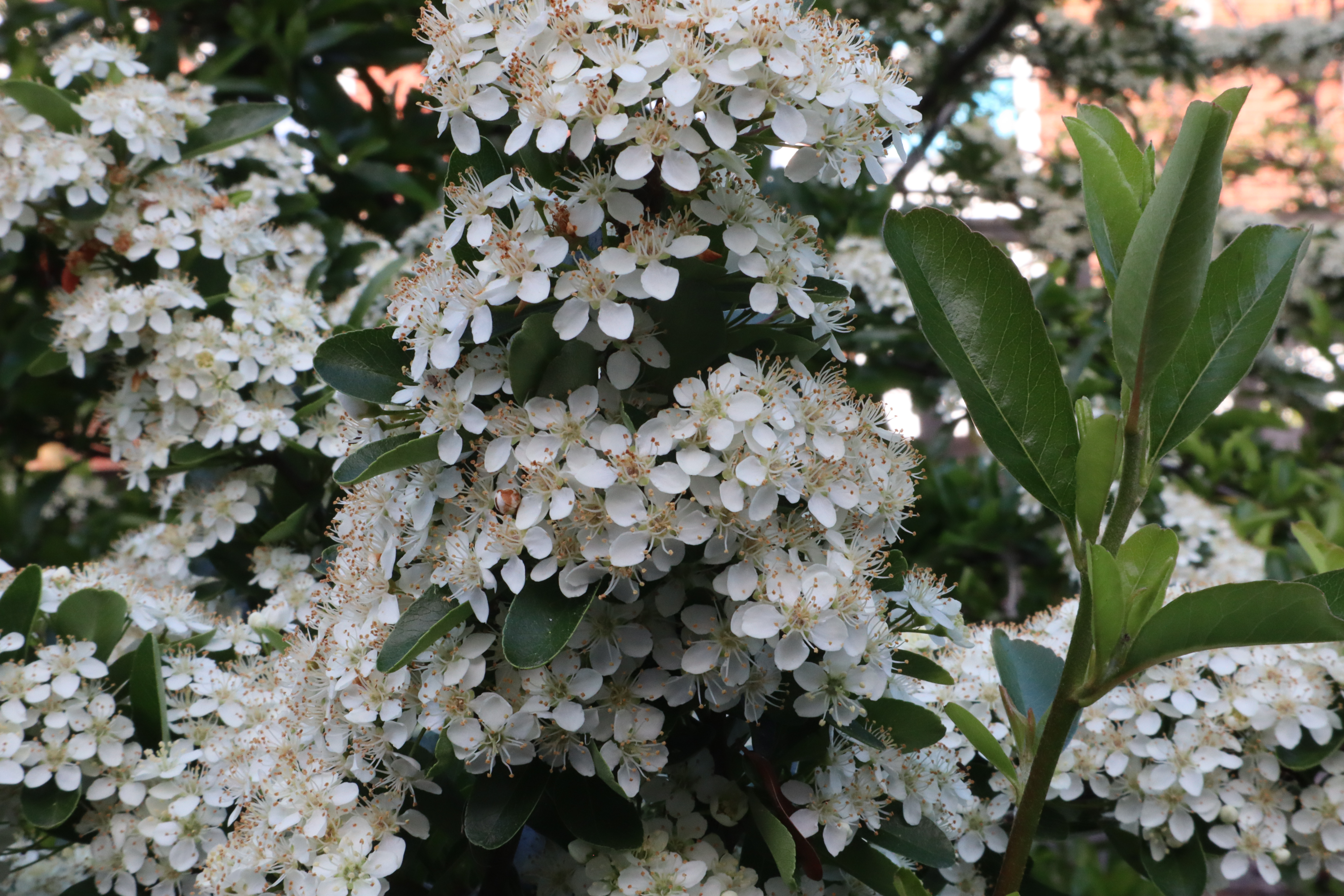

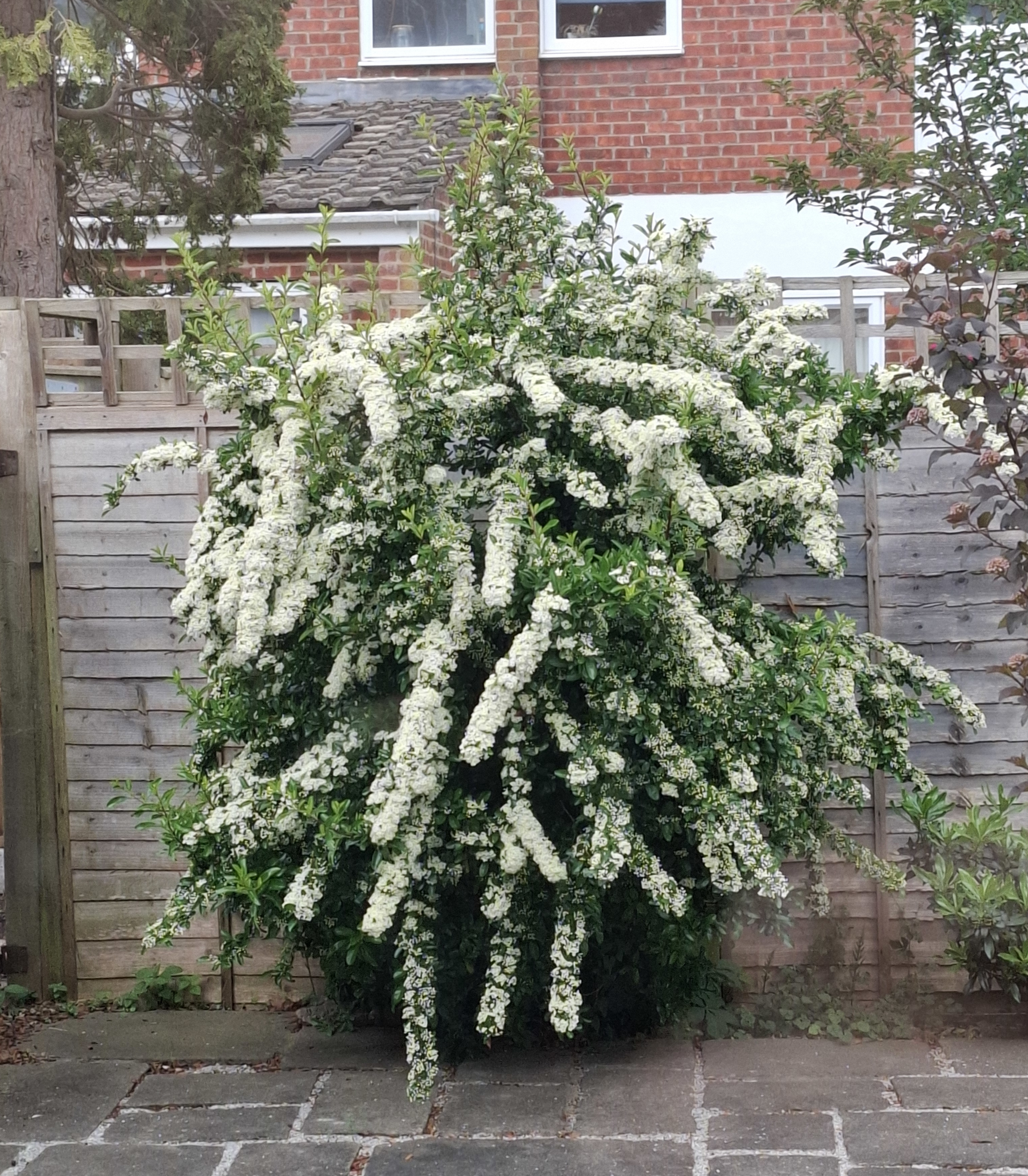

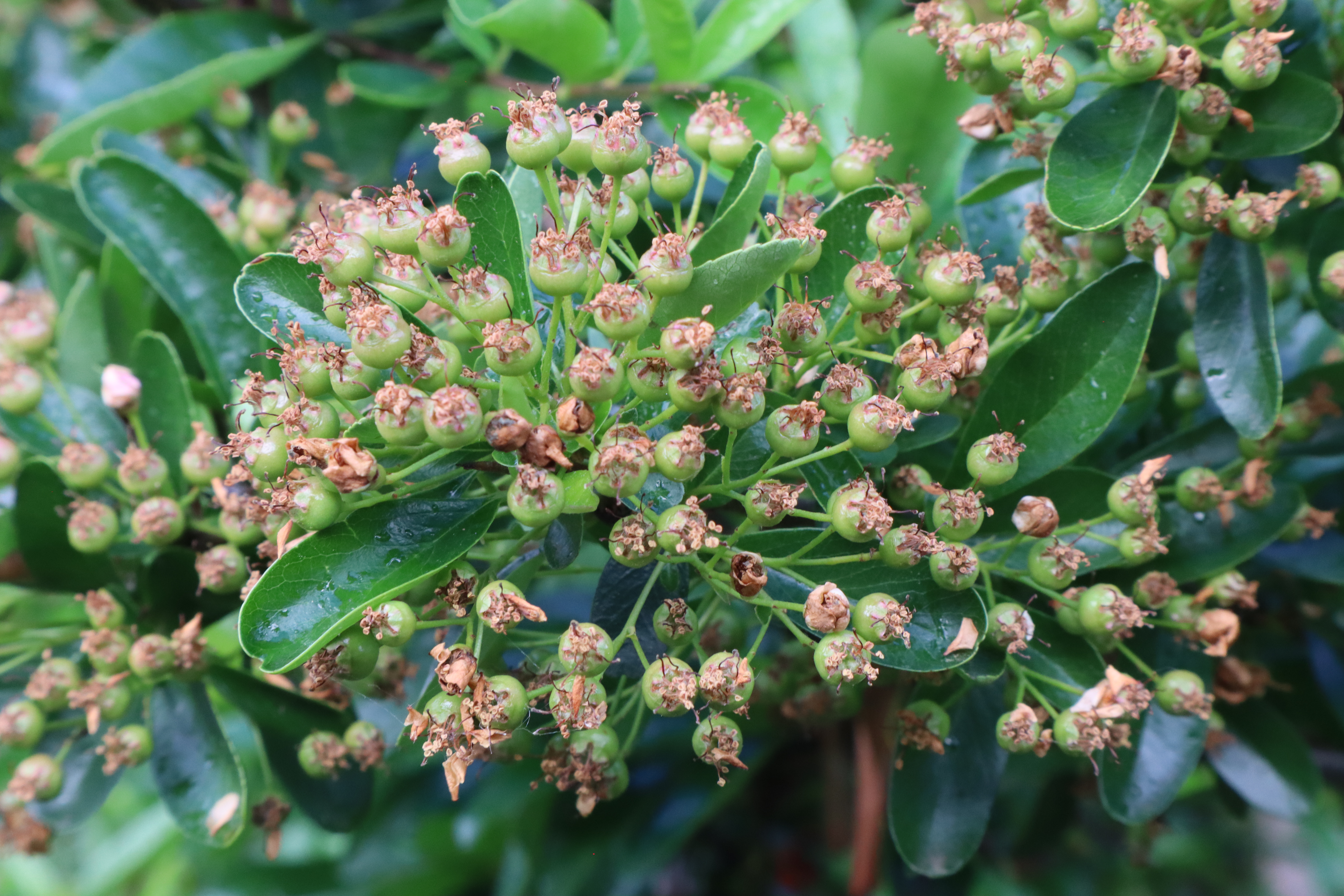

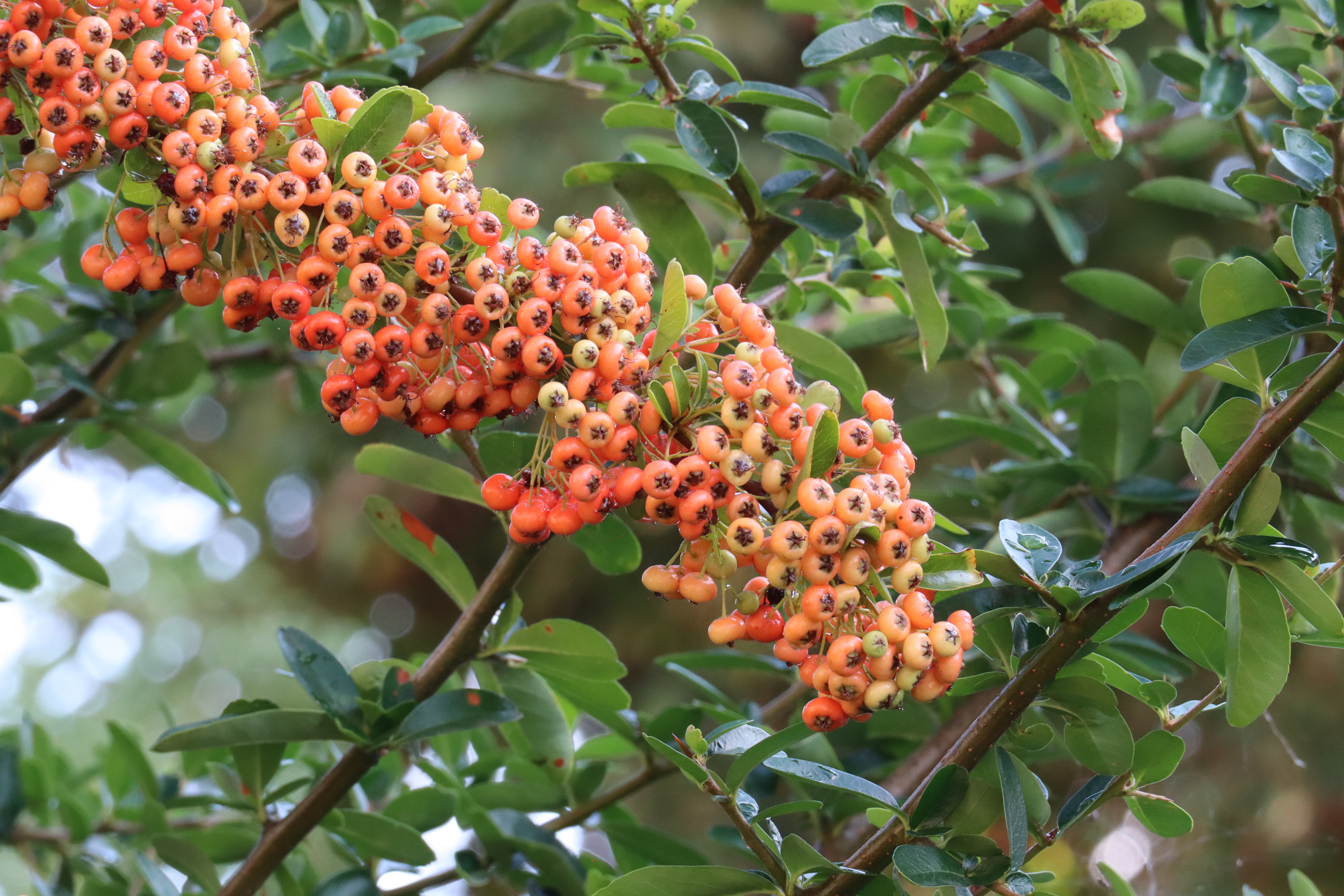

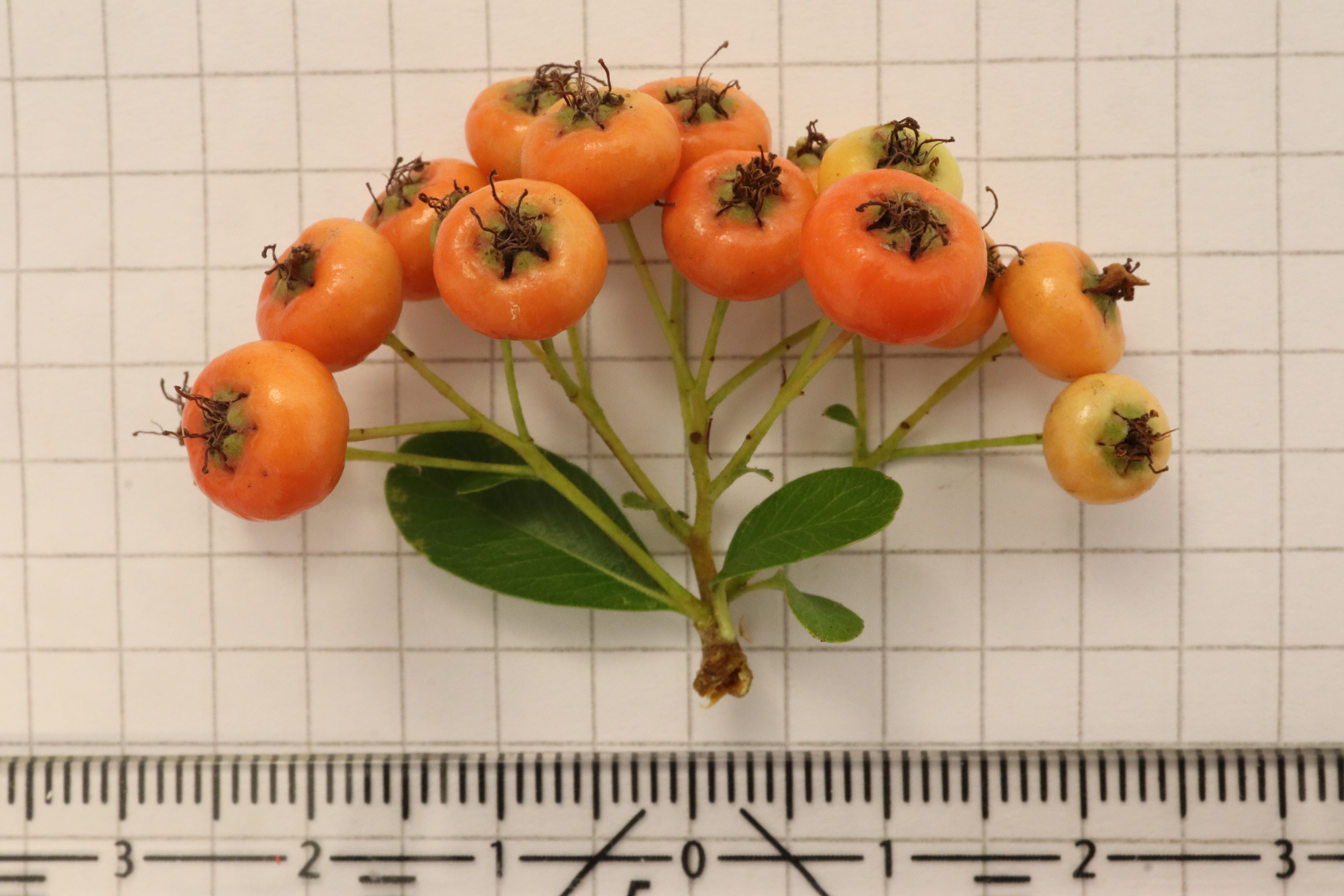

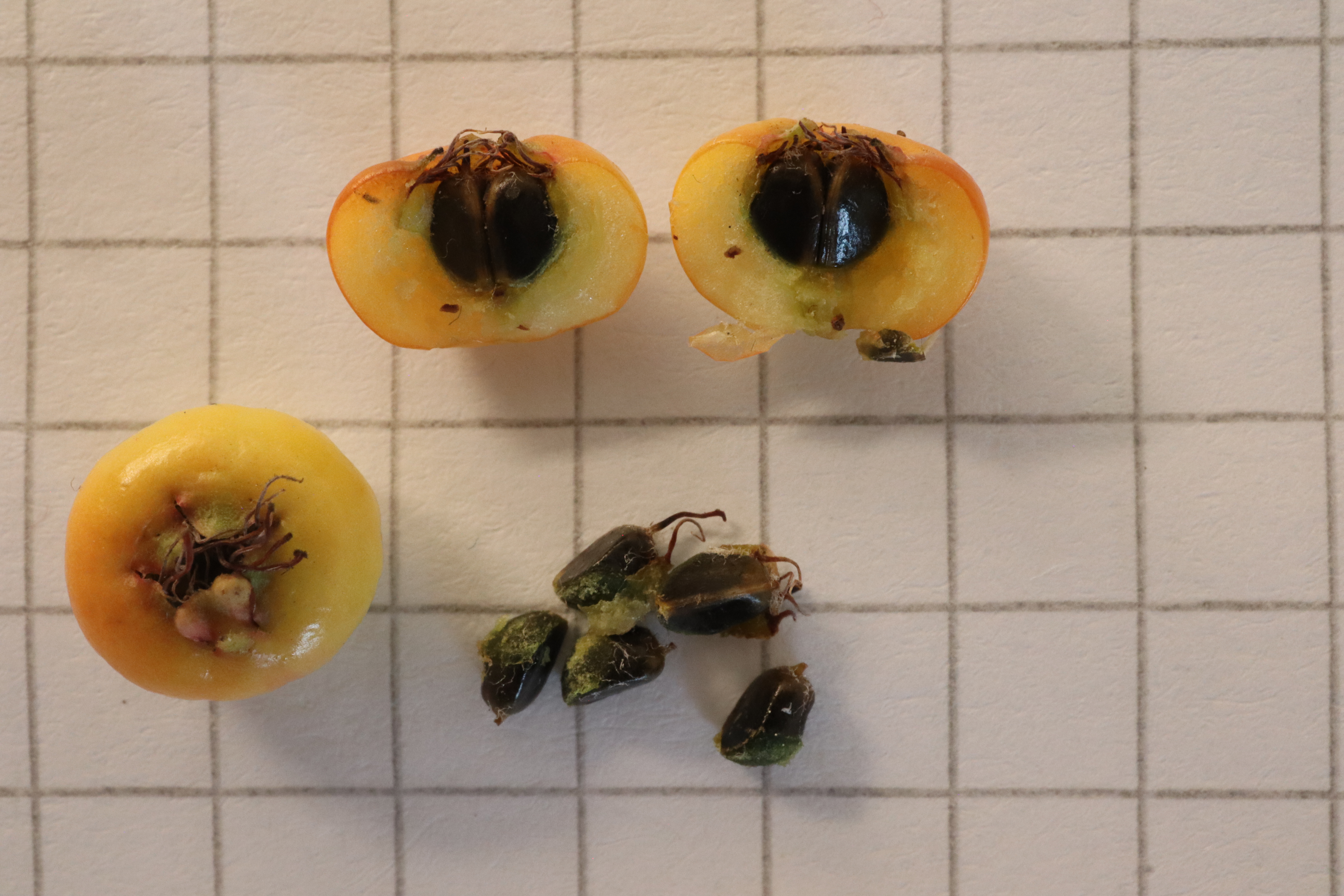

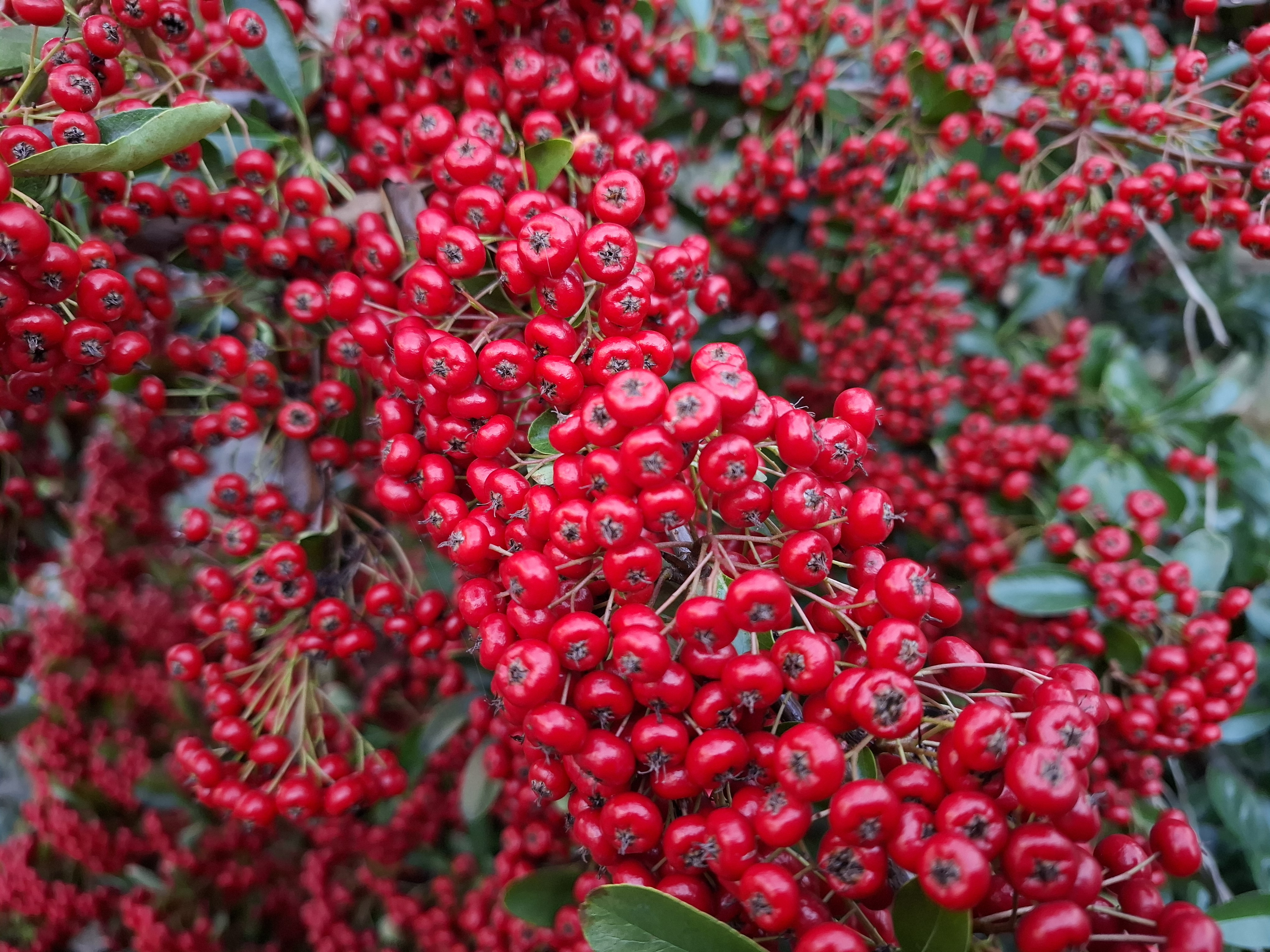

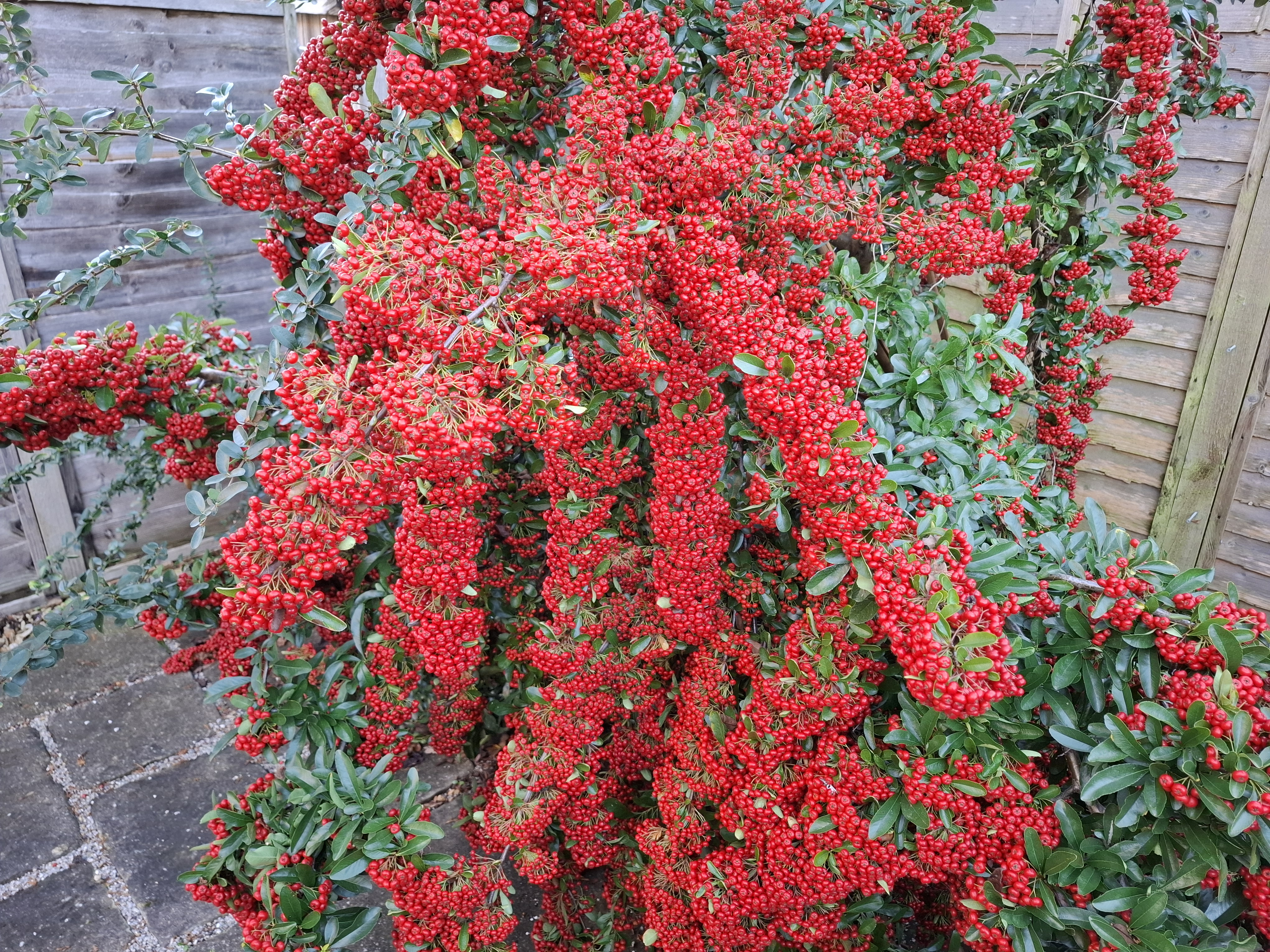

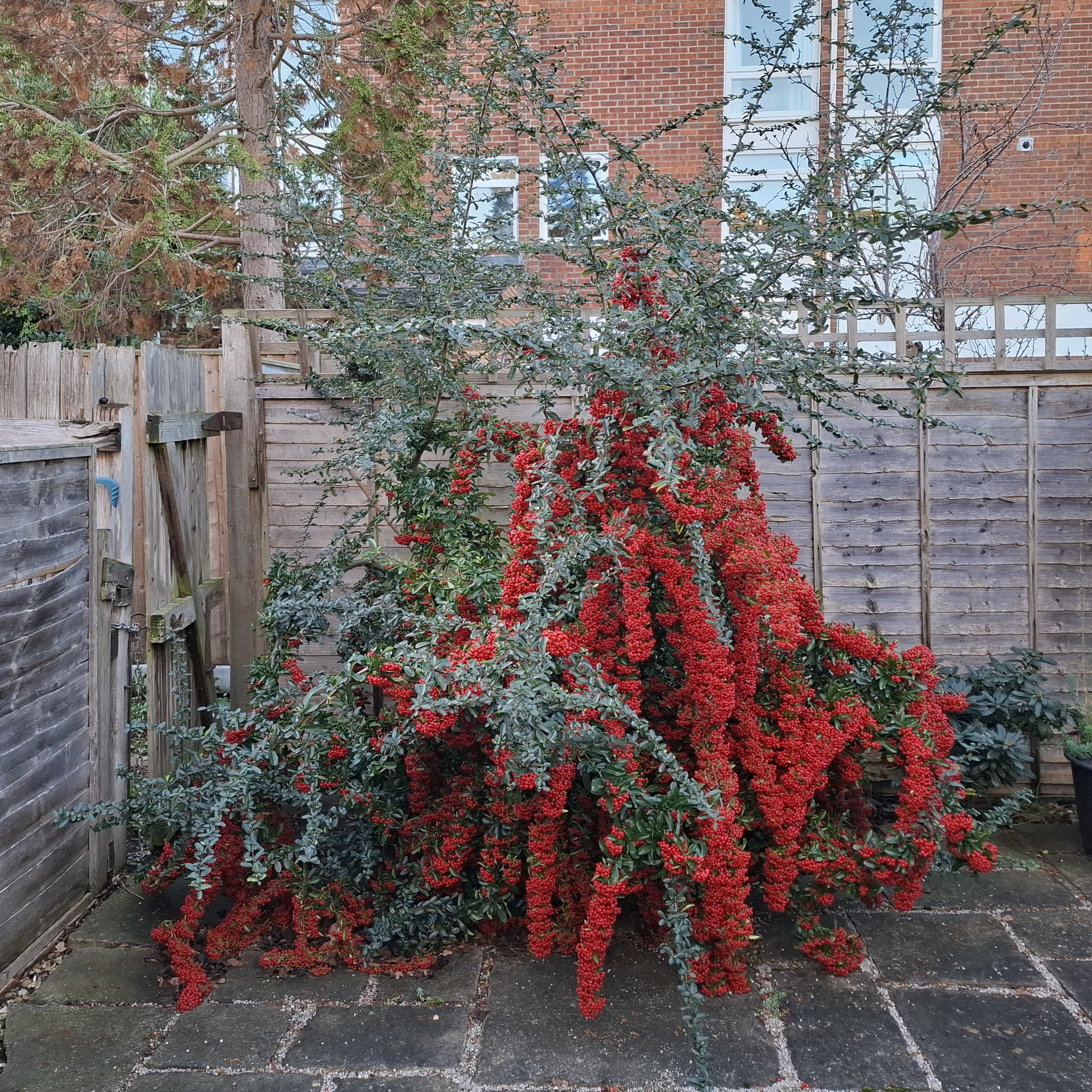

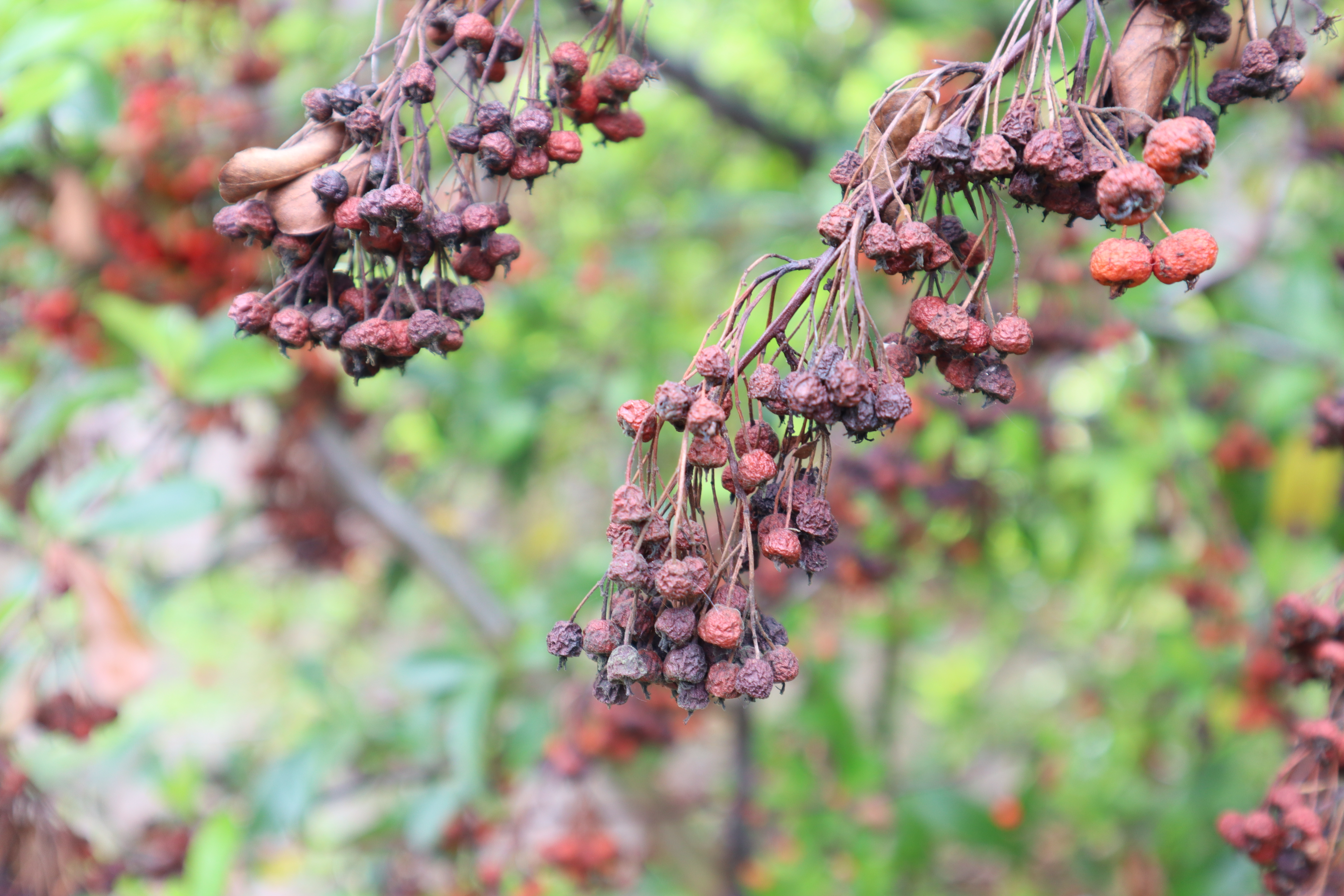
