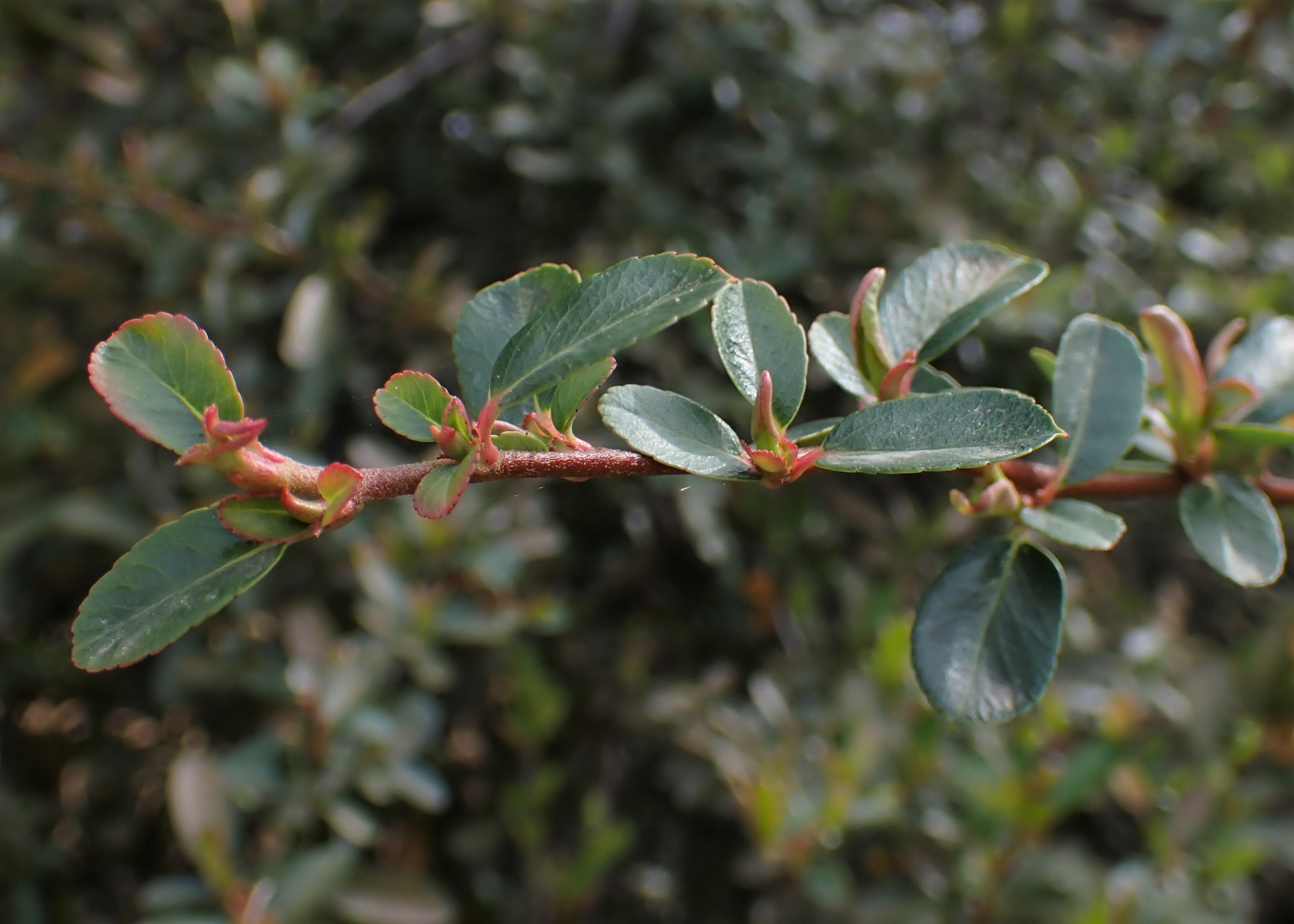

Scientific classification
- Kingdom: Plantae
- Clade: Tracheophytes
- Clade: Angiosperms
- Clade: Eudicots
- Clade: Rosids
- Order: Rosales
- Family: Rosaceae
- Genus: Pyracantha
- Species: P. rogersiana

Binomial name
- Pyracantha rogersiana Bean

= Pyracantha rogersiana =

Species of flowering plant

Pyracantha rogersiana, the Asian firethorn, is a species of flowering plant in the family Rosaceae, native to western China. Growing to 4 metres (13 ft) tall and broad, it is an evergreen shrub with glossy, narrow leaves, and masses of white flowers followed by small yellow berries 8 mm in diameter. It is grown in gardens, yards, and parks, where it can be used as hedging, wall cover, or in a mixed shrub border. The cultivar 'Flava' has gained the Royal Horticultural Society's Award of Garden Merit.

The seeds are somewhat poisonous if ingested, and may result in vomiting.
