= List of invasive species in South Africa =

Organisms that are recorded as invasive

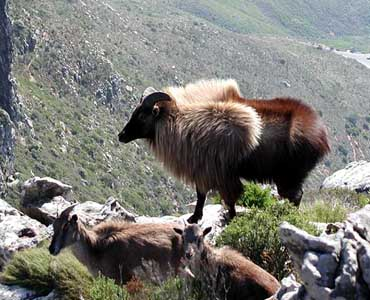
Himalayan tahr in Cape Town

This is a list of invasive species in South Africa, including invasive species of plants, animals, and other organisms in South Africa.

A list of invasive species has been published under the National Environmental Management: Biodiversity Act of 2004.

== Microorganisms ==
Microorganisms considered to be invasive species include:

Scientific name	Common name(s)	Home Territory	Environmental impact
beak and feather disease virus	BFDV	Australia	Psittacine Beak and Feather Disease (PBFD) is a viral disease that affects many birds including parrots. It attacks the feathers and beaks and causes infections that attack the immune system of its host.
Vibrio cholerae	cholera bacteria	unknown	The cholera bacterium is a bacterium that causes cholera. This species of bacteria lives in contaminated natural reservoirs (such as lakes, rivers and wells). It infects the intestines of people who drink water contaminated with human feces. It causes recurrent and aggressive diarrhea. But disappeared after three days. The ways to protect yourself are to drink uncontaminated water, wash your hands frequently and use chemical toilets or bury feces if no toilet is available; do not defecate in water and cook food thoroughly.

== Algae ==
Invasive species of algae include:

- Codium fragile ssp. tomentosoides – dead man's fingers
- Hypnea musciformis – hypnea
- Kappaphycus spp. – agar-agars

== Plants ==
Invasive species of plants include:

- Acacia adunca – cascade wattle
- Acacia baileyana – Bailey's wattle
- Acacia cyclops – red eye
- Acacia decurrens – green wattle
- Acacia elata – pepper tree wattle
- Acacia mearnsii – black wattle
- Acacia melanoxylon – Australian blackwood
- Acacia podalyriifolia – pearl acacia
- Acacia saligna – Port Jackson willow
- Acacia stricta – hop wattle
- Agave sisalana – sisal
- Agrimonia procera – fragrant agrimony
- Ailanthus altissima – tree of heaven
- Alisma plantago-aquatica – common water-plantain
- Anredera cordifolia – Madeira vine
- Antigonon leptopus – coral creeper
- Ardisia elliptica – shoebutton ardisia
- Aristolochia littoralis – elegant Dutchman's pipe
- Atriplex lindleyi ssp. inflata – spongefruit saltbush
- Atriplex nummularia – old man saltbush
- Austrocylindropuntia subulata – longspine cactus
- Azolla pinnata ssp. asiatica – mosquito fern
- Bartlettina sordida – blue mist flower
- Bauhinia purpurea – butterfly orchid tree
- Bauhinia variegata – orchid tree
- Billardiera heterophylla – bluebell creeper
- Cabomba caroliniana – Carolina fanwort
- Caesalpinia gilliesii – bird of paradise bush
- Callisia repens – creeping inchplant
- Calotropis procera – apple of Sodom
- Cardiospermum grandiflorum – showy balloon vine
- Casuarina cunninghamiana – beefwood
- Casuarina equisetifolia – horsetail tree
- Catharanthus roseus – Madagascar rosy periwinkle
- Cestrum spp. – jessamines
- Chondrilla juncea – skeletonweed
- Cirsium japonicum – Japanese thistle
- Cotoneaster franchetii – Franchet's cotoneaster
- Cotoneaster glaucophyllus – late cotoneaster
- Cotoneaster pannosus – silverleaf cotoneaster
- Cotoneaster salicifolius – willow-leaved cotoneaster
- Cotoneaster simonsii – Himalayan cotoneaster
- Crotalaria agatiflora – canarybird bush
- Cryptostegia madagascariensis – Madagascar rubber vine
- Cylindropuntia fulgida – jumping cholla
- Cylindropuntia imbricata – imbricate cholla
- Diplocyclos palmatus – lollipop-climber
- Dipogon lignosus – Australian pea
- Dolichandra unguis-cati – catclaw creeper
- Echinodorus cordifolius – creeping burhead
- Echinodorus tenellus – Amazon sword plant
- Egeria densa – Brazilian waterweed
- Eichhornia crassipes – common water hyacinth
- Elodea canadensis – Canadian waterweed
- Equisetum hyemale – rough horsetail
- Eriobotrya japonica – loquat
- Eucalyptus camaldulensis – river red gum
- Eucalyptus cladocalyx – sugar gum
- Eucalyptus diversicolor – karri
- Eucalyptus grandis – rose gum
- Eucalyptus paniculata – grey ironbark
- Eucalyptus sideroxylon – red ironbark
- Euphorbia esula – leafy spurge
- Euphorbia leucocephala – pascuita
- Fallopia sachalinensis – giant knotweed
- Flaveria bidentis – smelter's bush
- Galium tricornutum – corn cleavers
- Genista monspessulana – Montpellier broom
- Gleditsia triacanthos – honey locust
- Grevillea banksii – red silky oak
- Homalanthus populifolius – bleeding heart
- Hydrilla verticillata – hydrilla
- Hydrocleys nymphoides – water poppy
- Hylocereus undatus – night-blooming cereus
- Hypericum androsaemum – tutsan
- Hypericum perforatum – common St. John's wort
- Ipomoea carnea ssp. fistulosa – morning-glory bush
- Ipomoea purpurea – tall morning glory
- Iris pseudacorus – yellow flag
- Jacaranda mimosifolia – blue jacaranda
- Jatropha gossypiifolia – cotton-leaf physic nut
- Kalanchoe delagoensis – chandelier plant
- Kali tragus – Russian thistle
- Kunzea ericoides – burgan
- Lantana spp. – lantanas
- Ligustrum japonicum – Japanese privet
- Ligustrum lucidum – glossy privet
- Ligustrum ovalifolium – California privet
- Ligustrum sinense – Chinese privet
- Ligustrum vulgare – common privet
- Lilium formosanum – Formosa lily
- Linaria dalmatica – Dalmatian toadflax
- Linaria vulgaris – common toadflax
- Ludwigia peruviana – Peruvian primrosebush
- Lythrum hyssopifolia – hyssop loosestrife
- Lythrum salicaria – purple loosestrife
- Malva arborea – tree mallow
- Malva verticillata – Chinese mallow
- Malvastrum coromandelianum – prickly malvastrum
- Marsilea mutica – nardoo
- Melaleuca hypericifolia – hillock bush
- Melia azedarach – Persian lilac
- Metrosideros excelsa – New Zealand Christmas tree
- Mimosa pigra – giant sensitive plant
- Mirabilis jalapa – marvel of Peru
- Morus alba – white mulberry
- Myoporum laetum – New Zealand manatoka
- Myriophyllum aquaticum – parrotfeather
- Nasturtium officinale – watercress
- Nephrolepis exaltata – sword fern
- Nicandra physalodes – apple of Peru
- Nuphar lutea – yellow water-lily
- Nymphaea mexicana – Mexican water-lily
- Nymphoides peltata – yellow floating-heart
- Opuntia engelmannii – Engelmann's prickly-pear
- Opuntia microdasys – bunny ears cactus
- Orobanche ramosa – branching broomrape
- Parkinsonia aculeata – Mexican palo verde
- Paspalum quadrifarium – tussock paspalum
- Passiflora tarminiana – banana passionfruit
- Passiflora tripartita – banana passionfruit
- Paulownia tomentosa – empress tree
- Pennisetum purpureum – Napier grass
- Persicaria capitata – pink-head knotweed
- Phytolacca americana – American pokeweed
- Phytolacca dioica – belhambra
- Phytolacca icosandra – tropical pokeweed
- Pinus canariensis – Canary Islands pine
- Pinus elliottii – slash pine
- Pinus halepensis – Aleppo pine
- Pinus patula – patula pine
- Pinus pinaster – cluster pine
- Pinus radiata – Monterey pine
- Pinus roxburghii – chir pine
- Pinus taeda – loblolly pine
- Plectranthus barbatus – Indian coleus
- Pontederia cordata – pickerelweed
- Populus alba – white poplar
- Potentilla indica – mock strawberry
- Prosopis glandulosa – honey mesquite
- Prosopis velutina – velvet mesquite
- Prunus serotina – black cherry
- Psidium cattleianum – strawberry guava
- Psidium × durbanensis – Durban guava
- Psidium guajava – common guava
- Psidium guineense – Brazilian guava
- Pueraria montana – kudzu
- Pyracantha angustifolia – narrowleaf firethorn
- Pyracantha coccinea – red firethorn
- Pyracantha crenatoserrata – broadleaf firethorn
- Pyracantha crenulata – Himalayan firethorn
- Pyracantha koidzumii – Formosa firethorn
- Pyracantha rogersiana – Asian firethorn
- Ricinus communis – castor oil plant
- Robinia pseudoacacia – black locust
- Rubus armeniacus – Himalayan blackberry
- Rubus flagellaris – common dewberry
- Rubus fruticosus – European blackberry
- Rubus niveus – Ceylon raspberry
- Rumex usambarensis – East African dock
- Salix babylonica – weeping willow
- Salix × fragilis – crack willow
- Salsola kali – tumbleweed
- Salvia tiliifolia – lindenleaf sage
- Salvinia molesta – giant salvinia
- Sambucus canadensis – Canadian elder
- Sambucus nigra – European elder
- Senna bicapsularis – rambling senna
- Senna didymobotrya – peanut butter cassia
- Senna hirsuta – woolly senna
- Senna occidentalis – septicweed
- Senna pendula – Christmas senna
- Senna septemtrionalis – arsenic bush
- Solanum chrysotrichum – giant devil's fig
- Solanum pseudocapsicum – Jerusalem cherry
- Sorghum halepense – Johnson grass
- Syngonium podophyllum – arrowhead vine
- Syzygium cumini – jambolan
- Syzygium jambos – rose apple
- Tamarix aphylla – Athel tree
- Tamarix gallica – French tamarisk
- Tephrocactus articulatus – pine cone cactus
- Tipuana tipu – tipu tree
- Toona ciliata – toon
- Toxicodendron succedaneum – wax tree
- Tradescantia fluminensis – small-leaf spiderwort
- Tradescantia zebrina – inchplant
- Verbena bonariensis – tall verbena
- Verbena brasiliensis – Brazilian verbena
- Vinca major – greater periwinkle
- Vinca minor – lesser periwinkle
- Vitex trifolia – Indian three-leaf vitex

== Tunicates ==
Invasive species of tunicates include:

Scientific name	Common name(s)	Home Territory	Environmental impact
Ciona intestinalis	sea vase	unknown	The marine vase, enters in competition between other species in benthic environment. It takes the place of other native invertebrate species and causes a reduction in animal diversity in the environment in which it is newly installed, because of its high capacity to reproduce.

== Annelids ==
Invsive species of annelids include:

- Ficopomatus enigmaticus – Australian tubeworm
- Boccardia proboscidea – shell worm

== Molluscs ==
Invasive species of molluscs include:

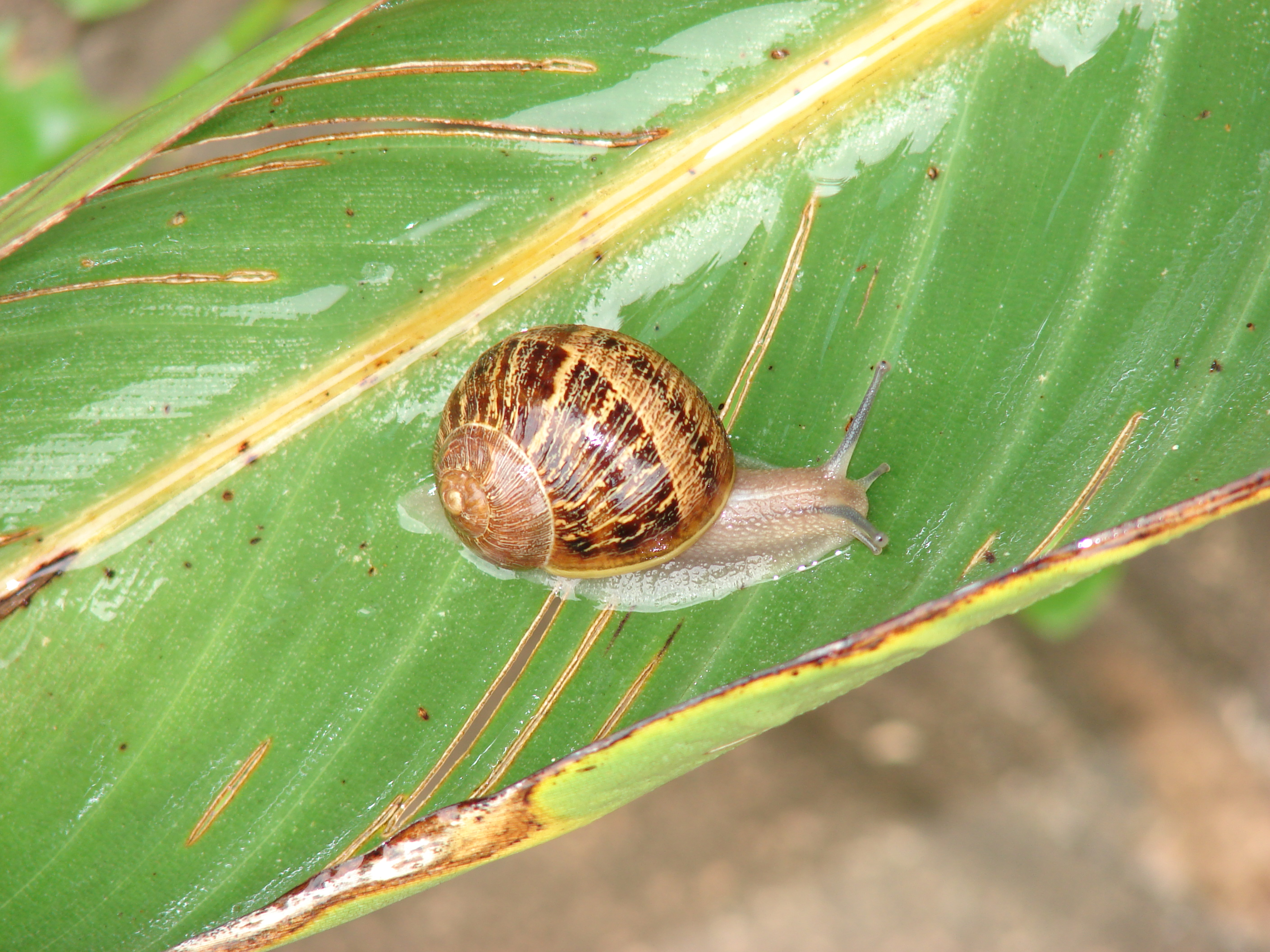
Cornu aspersum in Potchefstroom

- Aplexa marmorata – marbled tadpole snail
- Bradybaena similaris – Asian trampsnail
- Cochlicella barbara – potbellied helicellid
- Deroceras invadens – tramp slug
- Deroceras laeve – marsh slug
- Cornu aspersum – garden snail
- Limax flavus – yellow slug
- Milax gagates – greenhouse slug
- Mytilus galloprovincialis – Mediterranean mussel
- Pseudosuccinea columella – mimic lymnaea
- Semimytilus algosus – Pacific mussel
- Tarebia granifera – quilted melania
- Theba pisana – white garden snail
- Zonitoides arboreus – quick gloss

== Crustaceans ==
Invasive species of crustaceans include:

- Carcinus maenas – European shore crab
- Cherax quadricarinatus – redclaw crayfish
- Procambarus clarkii – red swamp crayfish

== Insects ==
Invasive species of insects include:

- Aedes albopictus – Asian tiger mosquito
- Anoplolepis gracilipes – yellow crazy ant
- Aphis spiraecola – green citrus aphid
- Aulacaspis yasumatsui – cycad aulacaspis scale
- Bactrocera invadens – Asian fruit fly
- Bemisia tabaci – silverleaf whitefly
- Cactoblastis cactorum – cactus moth
- Cinara cupressi – cypress aphid
- Coptotermes formosanus – Formosan subterranean termite
- Cosmopolites sordidus – banana root borer
- Cryptotermes brevis – West Indian drywood termite
- Ctenarytaina eucalypti – blue gum psyllid
- Eulachnus rileyi – pine needle aphid
- Frankliniella occidentalis – western flower thrips
- Harmonia axyridis – Asian lady beetle
- Hylastes ater – black pine bark beetle
- Hylurgus ligniperda – red-haired pine bark beetle
- Icerya purchasi – cottony cushion scale
- Linepithema humile – Argentine ant
- Orthotomicus erosus – Mediterranean pine engraver
- Phenacoccus manihoti – cassava mealybug
- Pineus pini – pine woolly aphid
- Polistes dominula – European paper wasp
- Pseudococcus calceolariae – Citrophilus mealybug
- Sirex noctilio – Sirex woodwasp
- Technomyrmex albipes – white-footed ant
- Thaumastocoris peregrinus – bronze bug
- Vespula germanica – European wasp
- Xyleborinus saxesenii – fruit-tree pinhole borer
- Xylosandrus compactus – black twig borer

== Fish ==
Invasive species of fish include:

- Ctenopharyngodon idella – grass carp
- Cyprinus carpio – common carp
- Gambusia affinis – western mosquitofish
- Hypophthalmichthys molitrix – silver carp
- Lepomis macrochirus – bluegill
- Micropterus dolomieu – smallmouth bass
- Micropterus punctulatus – spotted bass
- Micropterus salmoides – largemouth bass
- Micropterus salmoides floridanus – Florida bass
- Oreochromis niloticus – Nile tilapia (and hybrids)
- Perca fluviatilis – European perch
- Pterygoplichthys disjunctivus – vermiculated sailfin catfish
- Salmo salar – Atlantic salmon
- Tinca tinca – tench

== Amphibians ==
Invasive species of amphibians include:

- Amietophrynus gutturalis – guttural toad

== Reptiles ==
Invasive species of reptiles include:

- Emys orbicularis – European pond turtle
- Gehyra mutilata – stump-tailed gecko
- Hemidactylus frenatus – common house gecko
- Lepidodactylus lugubris – mourning gecko
- Tarentola mauritanica – Moorish wall gecko
- Trachemys scripta ssp. elegans – red-eared slider

== Birds ==
Invasive species of birds include:

- Acridotheres tristis – common myna
- Anas platyrhynchos – mallard (and hybrids)
- Columba livia – rock dove
- Corvus splendens – house crow
- Fringilla coelebs – common chaffinch
- Sturus vulgaris – European starling

== Mammals ==
Invasive species of mammals include:

- Felis silvestris – cat
- Hemitragus jemlahicus – Himalayan tahr
- Mus musculus – house mouse
- Rattus rattus – black rat
- Sus scrofa – feral pig

== See also ==
- Lists of invasive species
