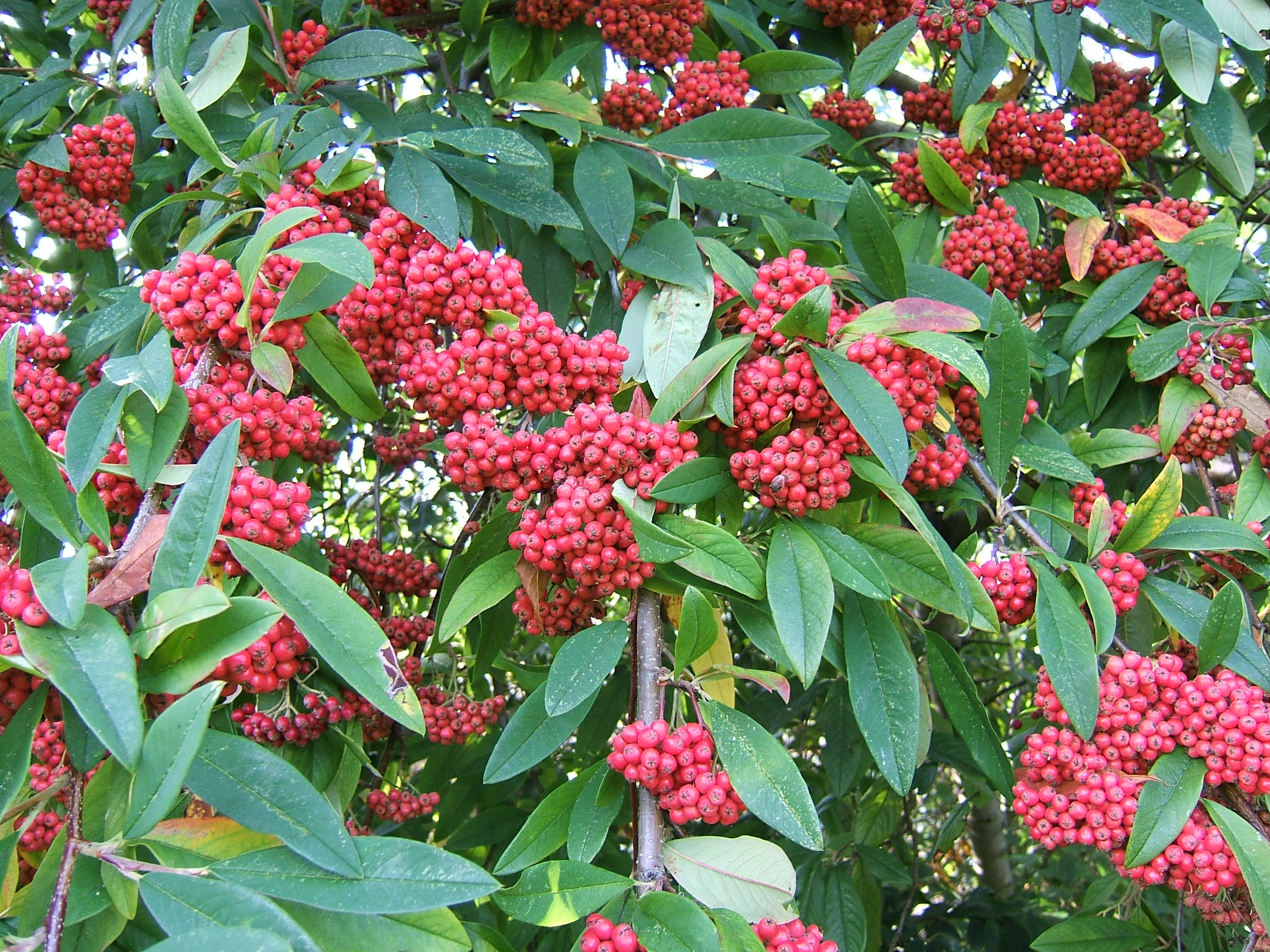
- Cotoneaster frigidus, leaves and fruit

Scientific classification
- Kingdom: Plantae
- Clade: Tracheophytes
- Clade: Angiosperms
- Clade: Eudicots
- Clade: Rosids
- Order: Rosales
- Family: Rosaceae
- Genus: Cotoneaster
- Species: C. frigidus

Binomial name
- Cotoneaster frigidus Wall. ex Lindl.

= Cotoneaster frigidus =

Species of flowering plant

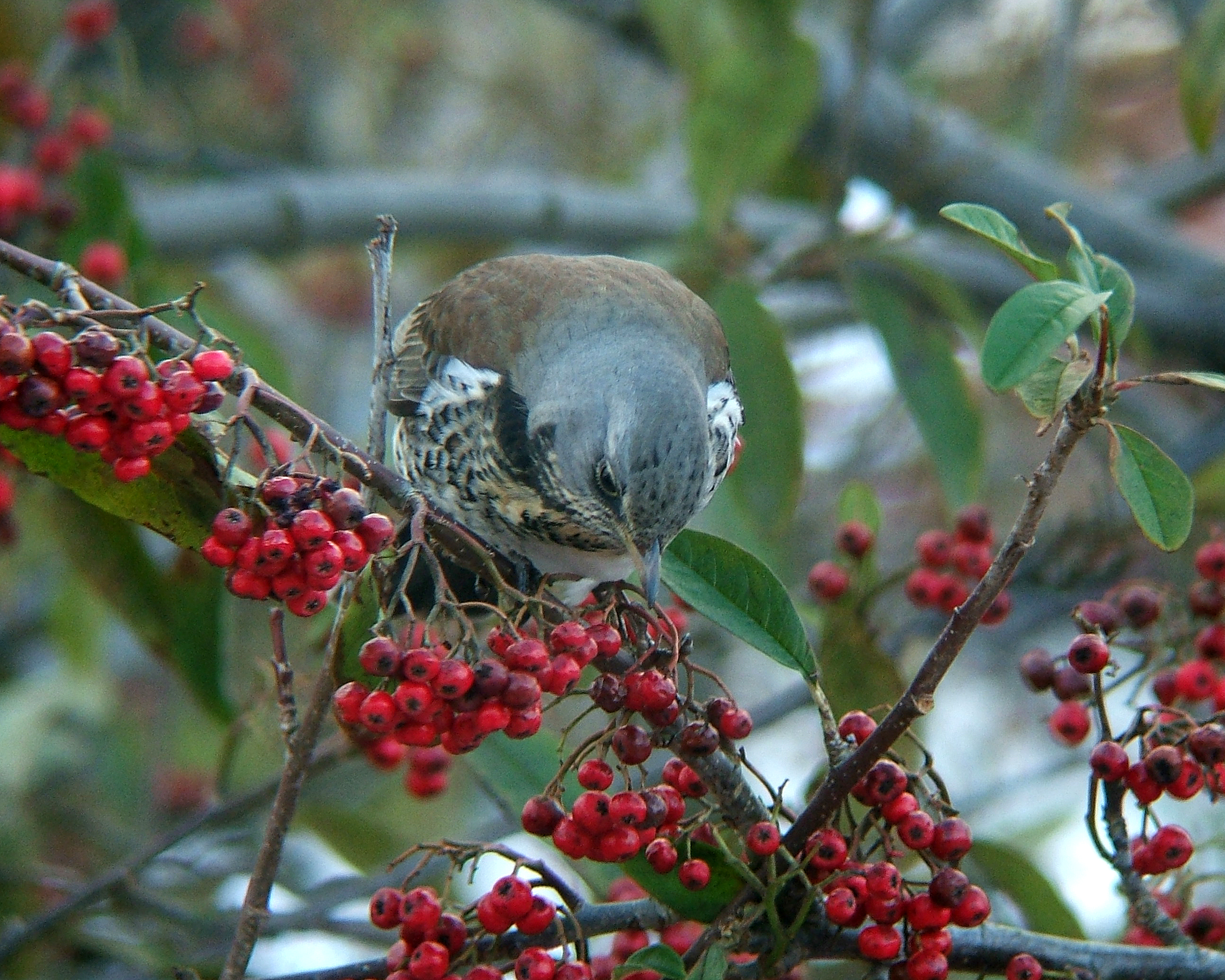
A Fieldfare feeding on C. frigidus fruit, Jesmond Dene, UK

Cotoneaster frigidus, the tree cotoneaster, is a species of flowering plant in the genus Cotoneaster of the family Rosaceae, native to the Himalayas.

== Description ==
It is a deciduous tree or shrub growing to 10–17 metres (33–56 ft), with smooth, matt, alternate leaves 6–12 cm long and 4–5 cm broad. The creamy-white flowers are followed by masses of small, globose, red fruit (pomes) 5 mm diameter in autumn, persisting into winter or later if not eaten by birds.

== Cultivation and uses ==
It is widely grown in parks and gardens in temperate regions, and is commonly naturalised as a result of bird-disperded seed in Great Britain and to a lesser extent in Ireland. It is one of the parents of the very popular garden shrub Cotoneaster × watereri; this can be distinguished by its narrower, more lanceolate, slightly more glossy leaves with slightly grooved leaf veins, characters inherited from its other parent Cotoneaster salicifolius. The more compact cultivar 'Cornubia' (syn. C. × watereri 'Cornubia') has gained the Royal Horticultural Society's Award of Garden Merit. It grows to 6 metres (20 ft).
