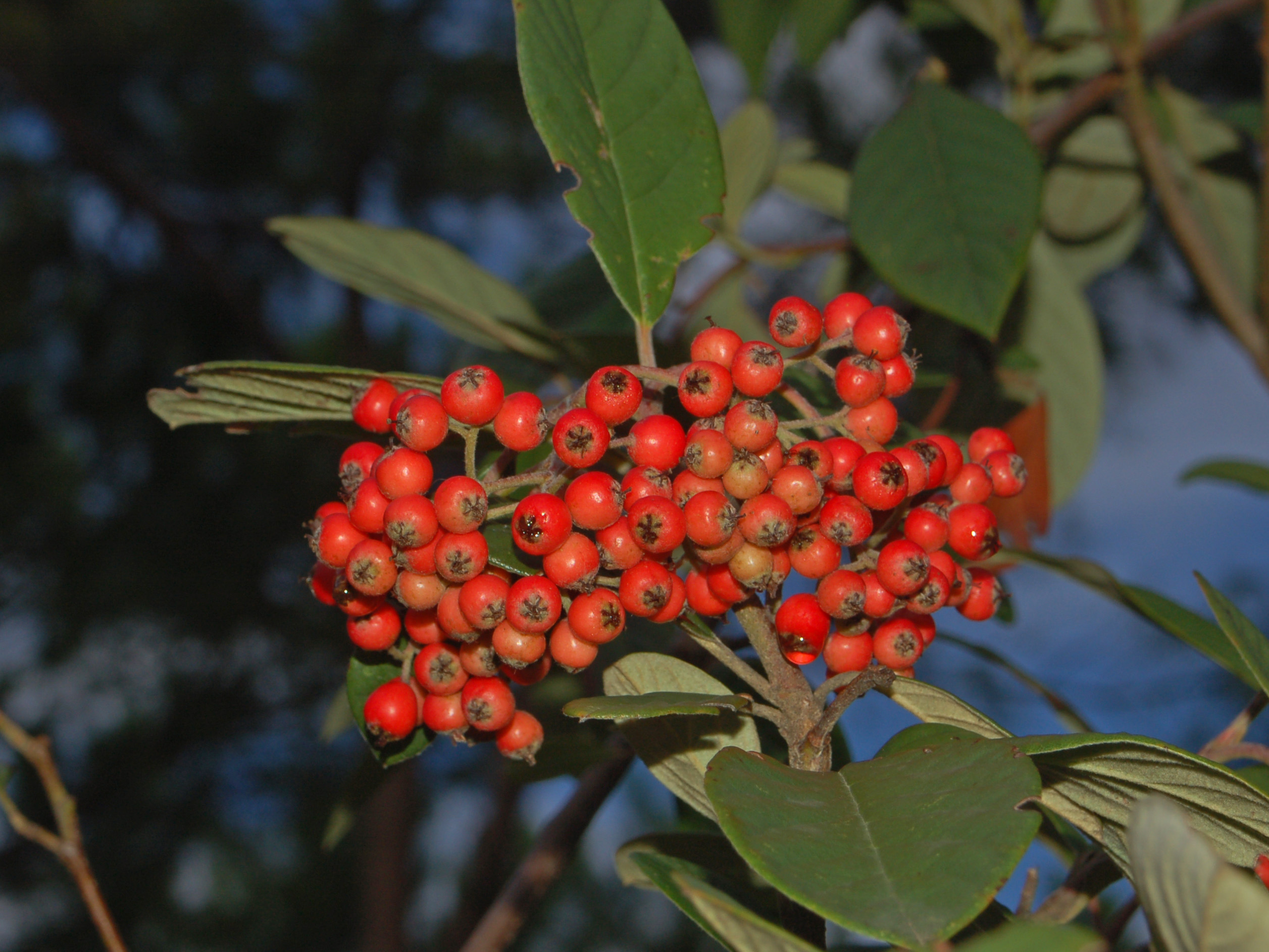
- Fruits of Cotoneaster × watereri

Scientific classification
- Kingdom: Plantae
- Clade: Tracheophytes
- Clade: Angiosperms
- Clade: Eudicots
- Clade: Rosids
- Order: Rosales
- Family: Rosaceae
- Genus: Cotoneaster
- Species: C. × watereri

Binomial name
- Cotoneaster × watereri Exell

= Cotoneaster × watereri =

Species of flowering plant

Cotoneaster × watereri, or Waterer's cotoneaster, is a large evergreen shrub belonging to the genus Cotoneaster. It is an artificial hybrid, initially of Cotoneaster frigidus, Cotoneaster henrianus and Cotoneaster salicifolius. Later also Cotoneaster rugosus and Cotoneaster sargentii were probably involved.

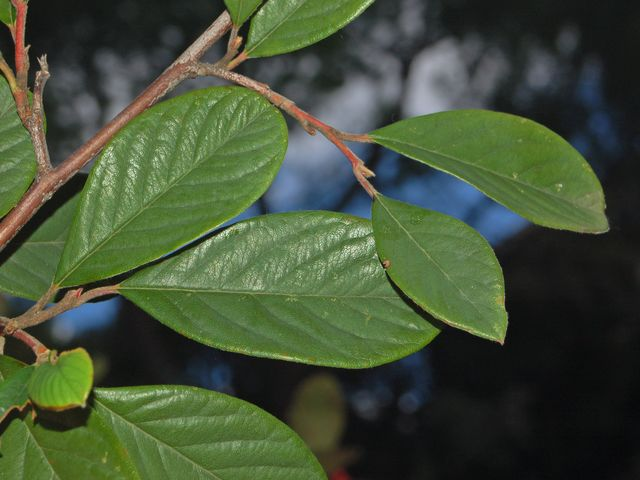
Leaves of Cotoneaster × watereri

== Description ==
Cotoneaster × watereri is about 4 m tall, up to 8 m at maturity. Leaves are elliptical, dark green, up to 12 cm long and 3 cm wide. This plant shows large attractive inflorescences with white small flowers and large spherical coral red berries of about 6–9 mm. It is in flower from June to July.
