= Christmas bush =

Christmas bush may refer to:

- Bursaria spinosa, a small tree or shrub that occurs in all Australian states
- Ceratopetalum gummiferum, a tall shrub from Australia also known as the New South Wales Christmas bush
- Chromolaena odorata, a tropical species of shrub from the sunflower family
- Comocladia dodonaea, a poisonous shrub of Caribbean islands
- Metrosideros excelsa, New Zealand Christmas bush
- Metrosideros kermadecensis, New Zealand Christmas bush
- Prostanthera lasianthos, a shrub from Australia also known as the Victorian Christmas bush
- Senna bicapsularis, a legume species from northern South America

== See also ==
- Bush Christmas
- Christmas berry
- Christmas plants
- O Christmas Bush
- Euphorbia leucocephala, called white Christmas bush
- Senna alata, called Christmas candles
