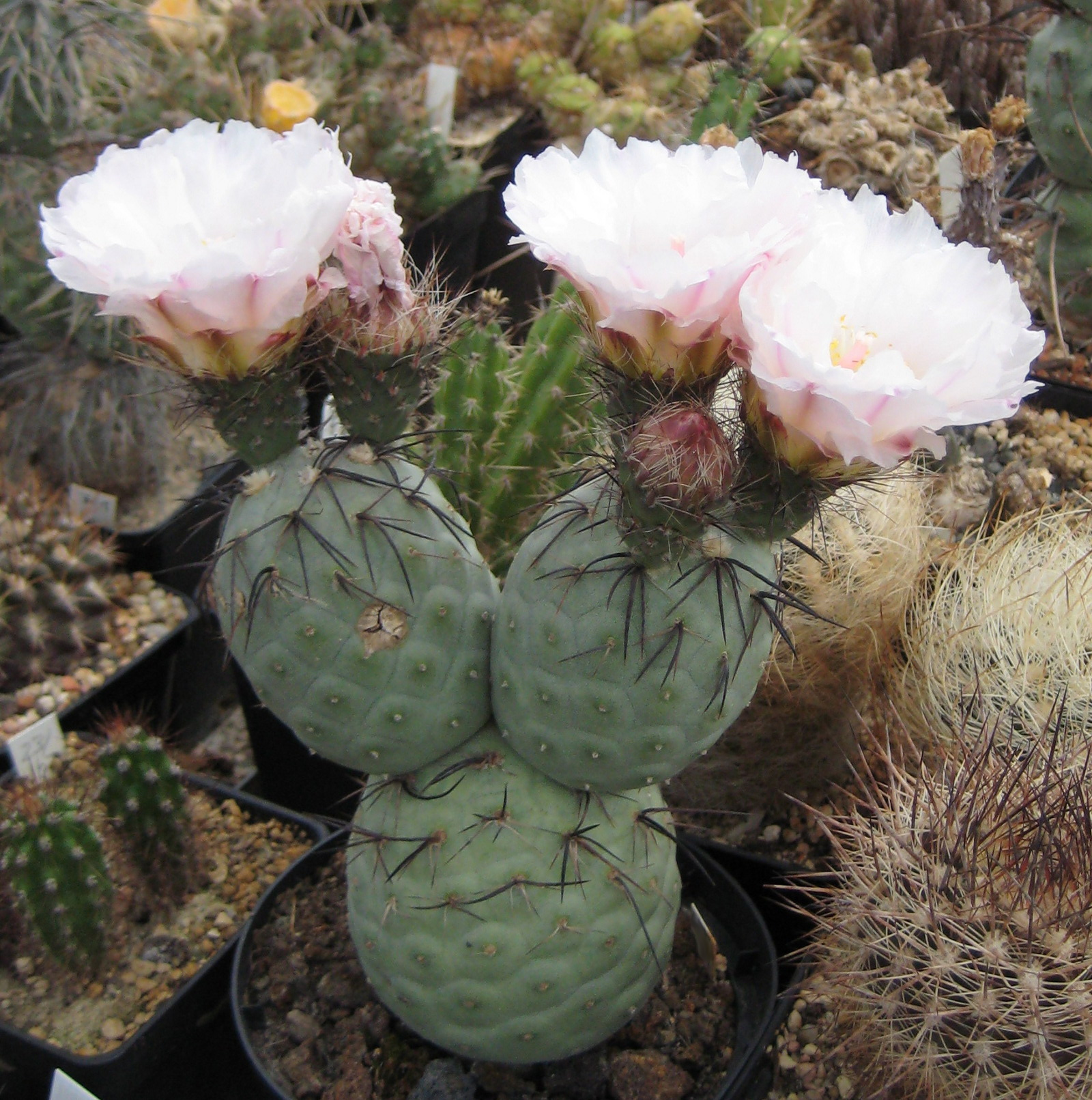

Scientific classification
- Kingdom: Plantae
- Clade: Tracheophytes
- Clade: Angiosperms
- Clade: Eudicots
- Order: Caryophyllales
- Family: Cactaceae
- Genus: Tephrocactus
- Species: T. alexanderi

Binomial name
- Tephrocactus alexanderi (Britton & Rose) Backeb.

Synonyms
- Tephrocactus geometricus (A.Cast.) Backeb.

= Tephrocactus alexanderi =

Species of cactus

Tephrocactus alexanderi, also known as Tephrocactus geometricus, is a species of cactus under the genus Tephrocactus. It is also classified under the subfamily Opuntioideae. It is native to Argentina Catamarca (Angostura de Guanchim and Tinogasta) and close to the Bolivian border, where it is exposed to extreme heat and an arid climate. T. geometricus receives its name from the Greek word γεωμετρία (geometria), meaning geometry.

== Description ==
Tephrocactus alexanderi grows in globular lobes, which sprout from one another and form clumps. The segments of the plant can be blue-green to purple with full sun exposure. Spines are mostly not present, with some growing from the upper areoles. Flowers are light pink to white and have a darker midstrip.

== Images ==
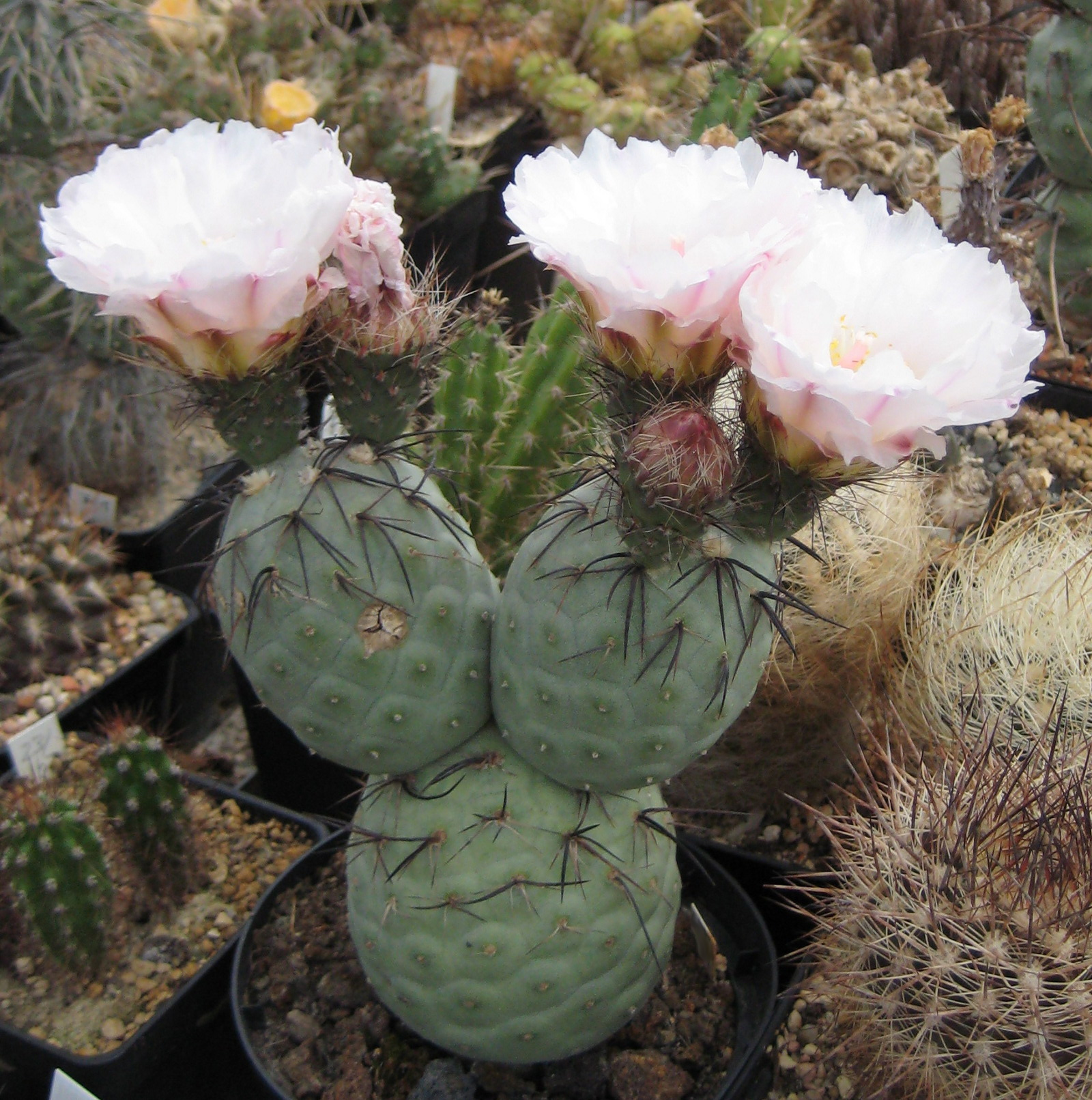
Flowering T. alexanderi

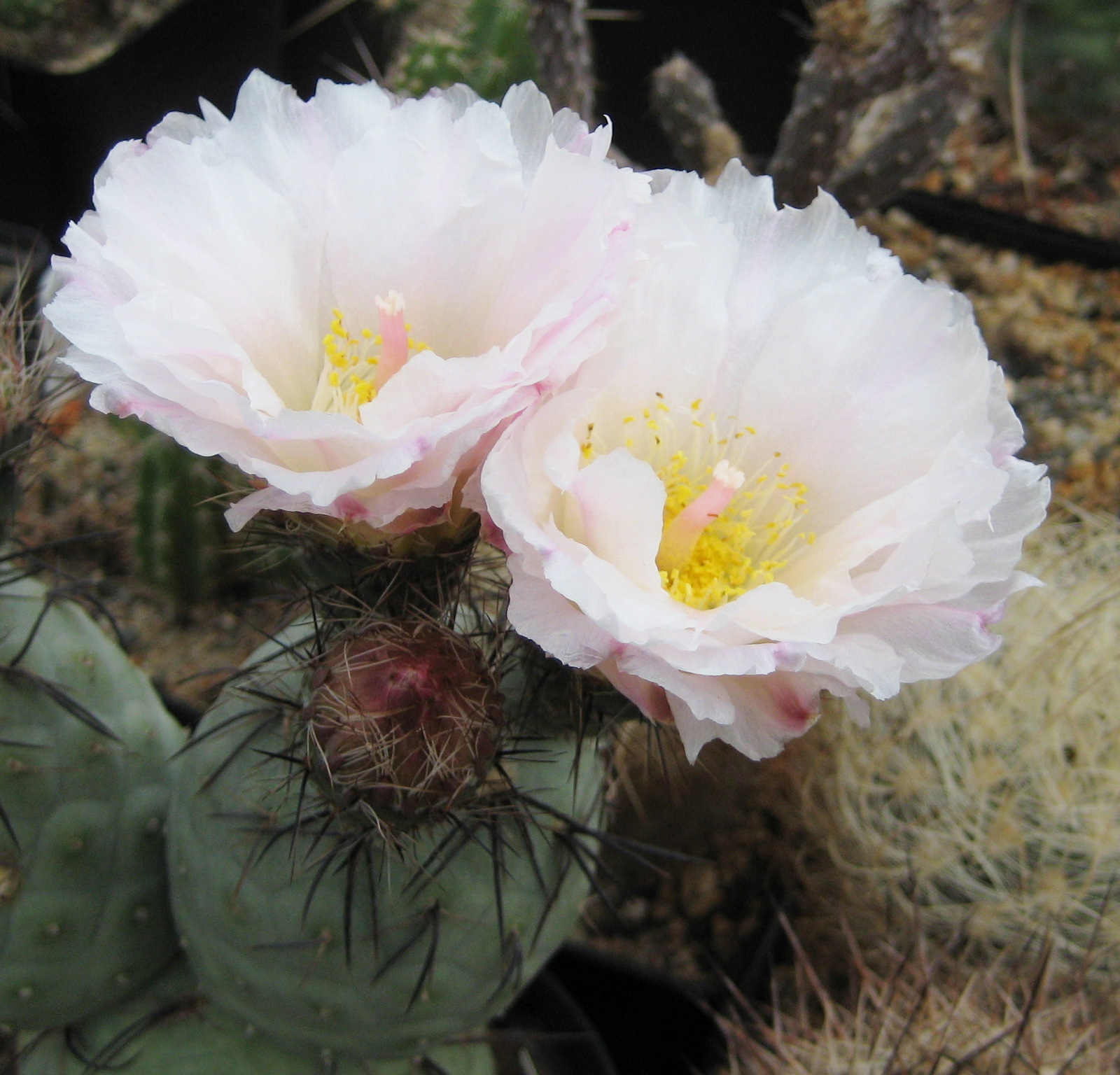
Flowers of T. alexanderi

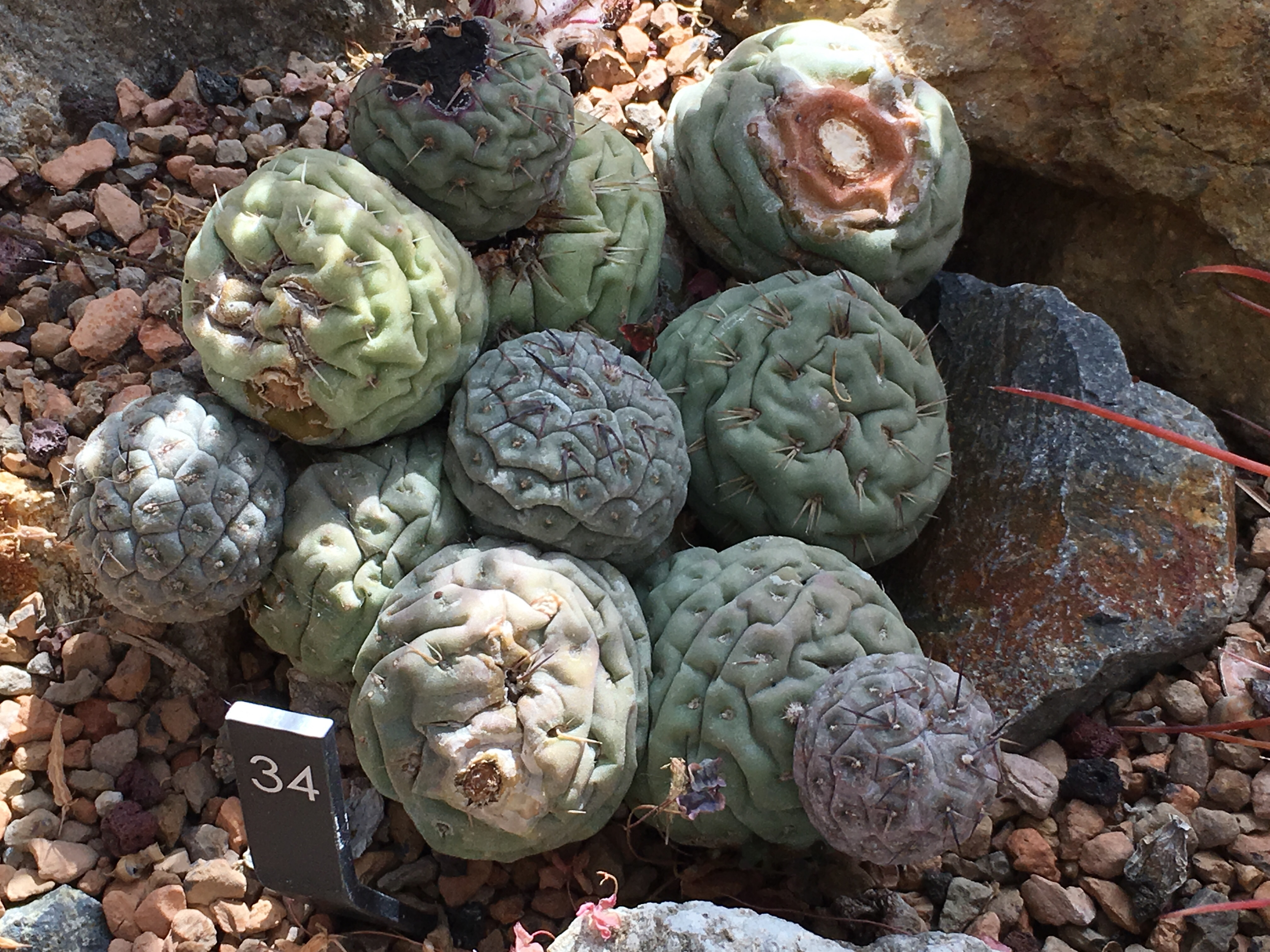
Tephrocactus alexanderi
