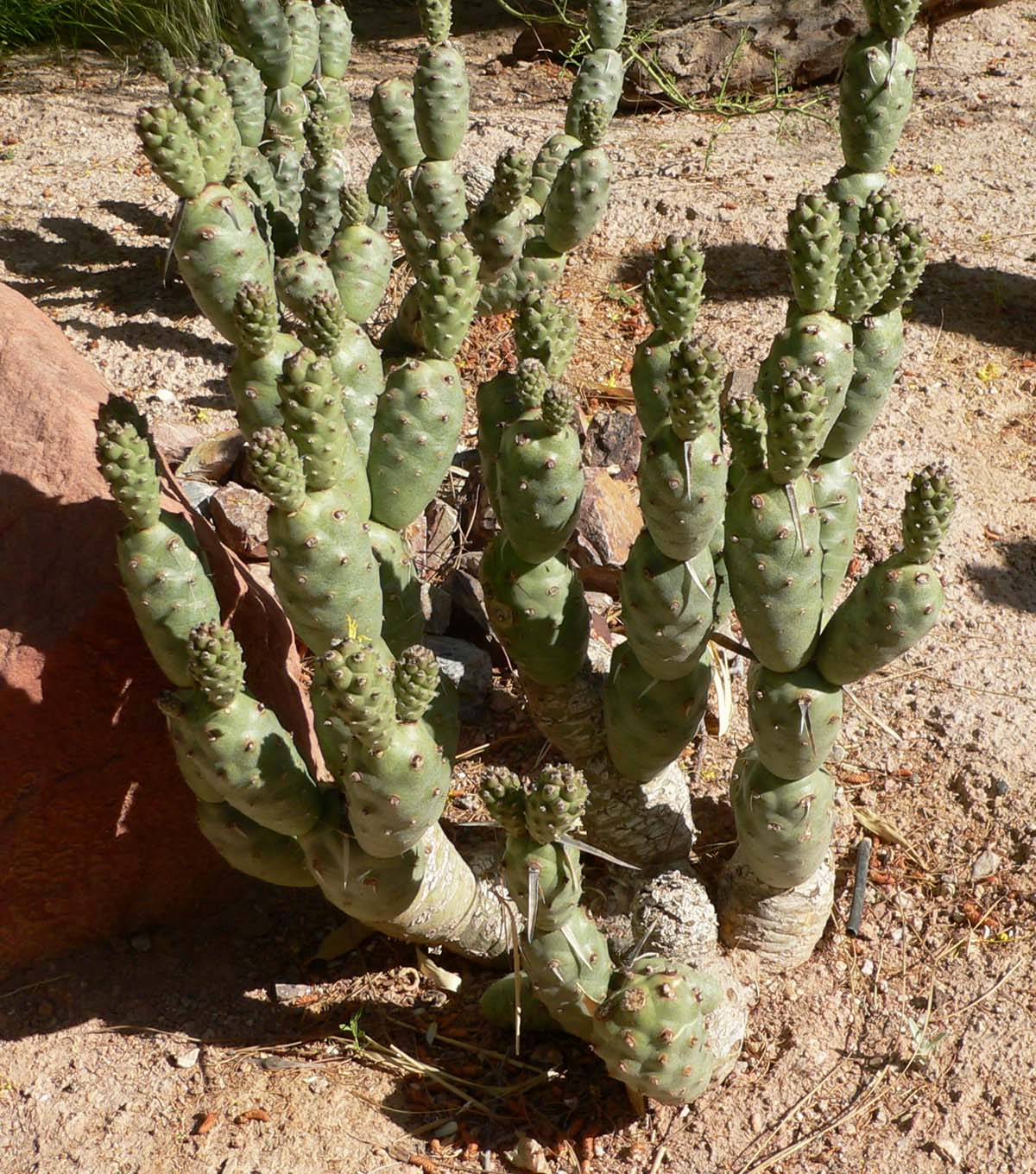
- Tephrocactus articulatus

Scientific classification
- Kingdom: Plantae
- Clade: Tracheophytes
- Clade: Angiosperms
- Clade: Eudicots
- Order: Caryophyllales
- Family: Cactaceae
- Subfamily: Opuntioideae
- Tribe: Tephrocacteae
- Genus: Tephrocactus; Lem.

Type species
- Tephrocactus articulatus

Species
- See Text

= Tephrocactus =

Genus of cacti

Tephrocactus (from Greek tephra, "ash", referring to the color of these plants' epidermis) is a genus of the cactus family (Cactaceae).

== Species ==
Species of the genus Tephrocactus according to Plants of the World Online as of October 2025:

Image	Scientific name	Distribution
	Tephrocactus abditus D.J.Ferguson & Janeba	Argentina (Salta)
	Tephrocactus alexanderi (Britton & Rose) Backeb.	Argentina.
	Tephrocactus aoracanthus (Lem.) Lem.	Argentina.
	Tephrocactus articulatus (Pfeiff.) Backeb.	Argentina.
	Tephrocactus bonnieae (D.J.Ferguson & R.Kiesling) Stuppy	Argentina (Catamarca)
	Tephrocactus molinensis (Speg.) Backeb.	Argentina (Salta)
	Tephrocactus nigrispinus (K.Schum.) Backeb.	Argentina, Bolivia, Chile
	Tephrocactus recurvatus (Gilmer & H.P.Thomas) D.R.Hunt & Ritz	Argentina (San Juan)
	Tephrocactus verschaffeltii (Cels ex F.A.C.Weber) D.R.Hunt & Ritz	Argentina, Bolivia
	Tephrocactus weberi (Speg.) Backeb.	Argentina (Salta).

== Bibliography ==
- G. G. Leyton-Boyce et J. Illiff : The subgenus Tephrocactus (of the genus Opuntia), Morden, 1973
