= National Environmental Management: Biodiversity Act, 2004 =

South African conservation law

The National Environmental Management: Biodiversity, Act 2004 (Act 10 of 2004, abbr. NEMBA) is a supporting act to the framework set out in the National Environmental Management Act, 1998. It enforces Section 24 of the Constitution of the Republic of South Africa; promoting the conservation and sustainable use of South Africa's biodiversity.

== Purpose ==
To provide for the management and conservation of South Africa's biodiversity within the framework of the National Environmental Management Act,1998; the protection of species and ecosystems that warrant national protection; the sustainable use of indigenous biological resources; the fair and equitable sharing of benefits arising from bioprospecting involving indigenous biological resources; the establishment and functions of a South African National Biodiversity Institute; and for matters connected therewith.

== Alien & invasive species regulations ==
=== Lists ===
The Alien and Invasive Species lists are published in terms of the sections introduced in NEMBA; the 11 lists are:

- National List of Invasive Terrestrial and Fresh-water Plant Species
- National List of Invasive Marine Plant Species
- National List of Invasive Mammal Species
- National List of Invasive Bird Species
- National List of Invasive Reptile Species
- National List of Invasive Amphibian Species
- National List of Invasive Fresh-water Fish Species
- National List of Invasive Marine Fish Species
- National List of Invasive Terrestrial Invertebrate Species
- National List of Invasive Fresh-water Invertebrate Species
- National List of Invasive Marine Invertebrate Species
- National List of Invasive Microbial Species

=== Categories ===
The 559 alien species listed are regulated by three categories, viz:

- Category 1a species, targeted for national eradication.
- Category 1b species, species must be controlled as part of a national management programme, and cannot be traded or allowed to spread.
- Category 2 species, permits are required for use in forestry, holders must ensure the species doesn't spread beyond its domain. 560 taxa are listed as prohibited and permits are denied.
- Category 3 species, species for which permits are not required, these species are controlled, phased out, and cannot be replaced.

Most activities with regards to the alien species are prohibited (such as importing, propagating, introducing, translocating or trading) and it should be ensured that species exempted for an existing plantation does not spread beyond its domain.

== History ==
On 3rd April 2009, Minister of Environmental Affairs and Tourism, Marthinus van Schalkwyk, published a draft of the Alien and Invasive Species programme. A second draft was published in 2014. On 1st August 2014, Minister of Environmental Affairs, Edna Molewa published the Alien and Invasive Species regulation.

== See also ==
- List of invasive species in South Africa
