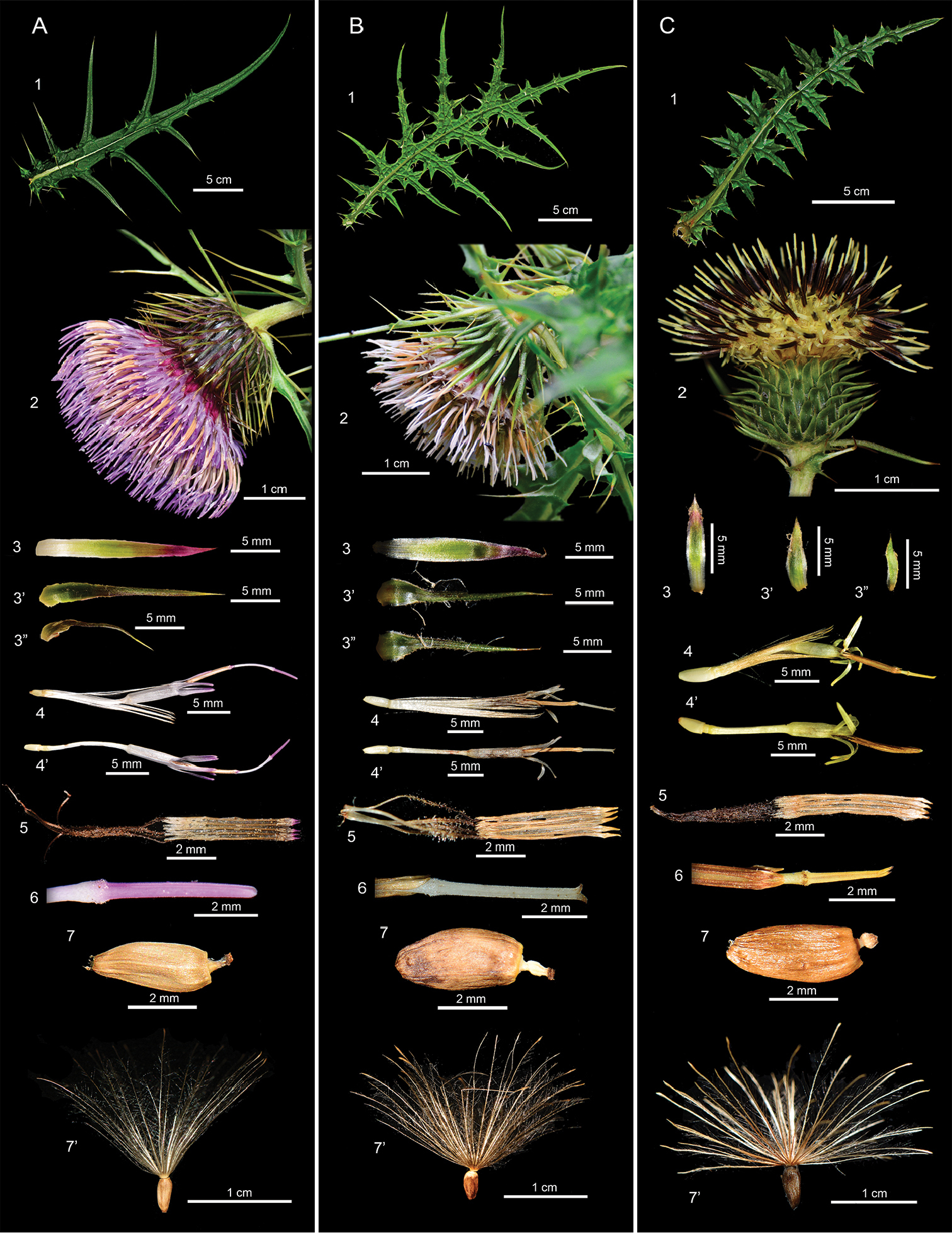
- From left to right: C. tatakaense, C. kawakamii, and C. arisanense

Scientific classification
- Kingdom: Plantae
- Clade: Tracheophytes
- Clade: Angiosperms
- Clade: Eudicots
- Clade: Asterids
- Order: Asterales
- Family: Asteraceae
- Genus: Cirsium
- Species: C. arisanense

Binomial name
- Cirsium arisanense Kitam.

= Cirsium arisanense =

Species of plant

Cirsium arisanense is an endemic flowering plant of Taiwan within the family Asteraceae. Its common name in Chinese, the Alishan thistle (Chinese: 阿里山薊), as well as its species name, refer to the Alishan Range. C. arisanense grows at an elevation of 2,300 meters, near mountain summits.
