= Christmasberry =

Christmasberry (also Christmas berry or Christmas-berry) can refer to any one of several shrubs or small trees, as well as their colorful fruit:

- Ardisia crenata, native to Asia and Australia
- Crossopetalum ilicifolium
- Lycium carolinianum (Carolina desert-thorn, family Solanaceae), a boxthorn native to subtropical North America
- Heteromeles arbutifolia (toyon or California holly, family Rosaceae), native to southern California and northern Mexico
- Passerina ericoides, a South African shrub
- Photinia villosa
- Ruscus aculeatus cultivar 'Christmas Berry'
- Schinus terebinthifolia (Brazilian pepper, family Anacardiaceae), native to South America but introduced and invasive in many tropical and subtropical areas

== See also ==
- Christmas bush
