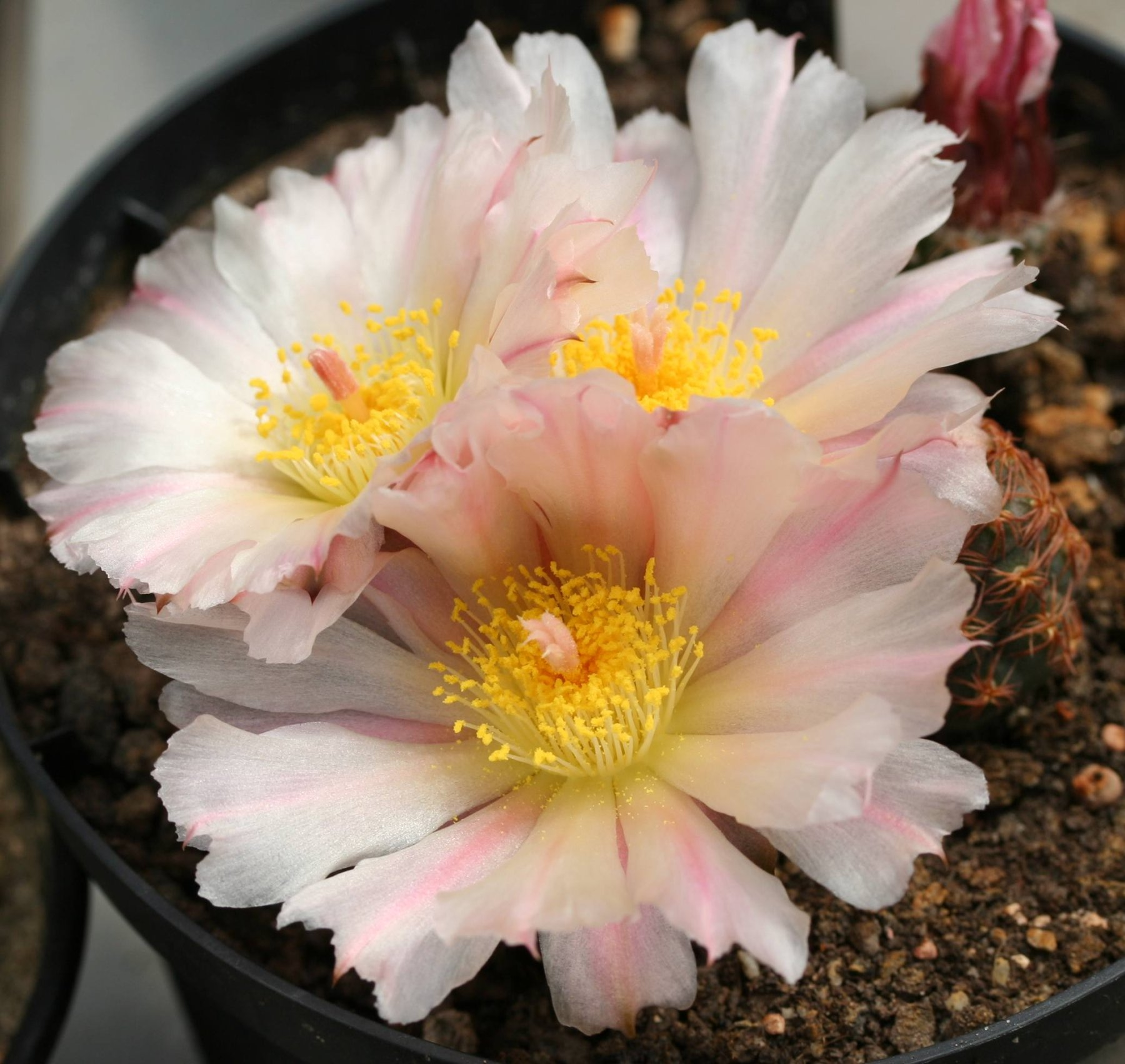

Conservation status
- Endangered (IUCN 3.1)

Scientific classification
- Kingdom: Plantae
- Clade: Tracheophytes
- Clade: Angiosperms
- Clade: Eudicots
- Order: Caryophyllales
- Family: Cactaceae
- Genus: Tephrocactus
- Species: T. bonnieae

Binomial name
- Tephrocactus bonnieae (D.J.Ferguson & R.Kiesling) Stuppy

= Tephrocactus bonnieae =

Species of cactus

Tephrocactus bonnieae is a species of plant in the family Cactaceae. It is endemic to Argentina. Its natural habitat is hot deserts. It is threatened by habitat loss.
