= National Environmental Management Act, 1998 =

South African statutory law for environmental management

The National Environmental Management Act, 1998 (Act No. 107 of 1998, abbreviated NEMA) is the statutory framework to enforce Section 24 of the Constitution of the Republic of South Africa. The NEMA is intended to promote co-operative governance and ensure that the rights of people are upheld, but also recognising the necessity of economic development. NEMA supersedes the Environmental Conservation Act, which was inadequate to deal with enforcement, administration, and governance, and was written to be more successful in these aspects.

== Purpose ==
To provide for co-operative, environmental governance by establishing principles for decision-making on matters that affect the environment, institutions will promote co-operative governance and procedures for co-ordinating environmental functions exercised by organs of state; and to provide for matters connected therewith.

== Promulgation ==
Published as: Republic of South Africa (22 November 1998). "National Environmental Management Act. 1998". Government Gazette. 401 (19519). Cape Town: Government Printer.

The act repealed a large part of the Environment Conservation Act. 1989 (Act No, 73 of 1989).

== Amendments ==
- Mineral and Petroleum Resources Development Act 28 of 2002 from 1 May 2004: Section 36
- National Environmental Management Amendment Act 56 of 2002 from 29 January 1999: Sections 1, 44
- National Environmental Management Amendment Act 46 of 2003 from 1 May 2005: Sections 1, 30-32, 34, 42, 47, 49
- National Environmental Management Amendment Act 8 of 2004 from 14 July 2004: Sections 1, 24, 43, 47, 50, Schedule 3
- National Environmental Management: Air Quality Act 39 of 2004 from 24 February 2005: Section 1
- National Environmental Management Laws Amendment Act 44 of 2008 from 11 September 2009: Section 1, 31
  - Also amends Environment Conservation Act 73 of 1989
  - Also amends National Environment Laws Amendment Act 44 of 2008
  - Also amends National Environment Management: Air Quality Act 39 of 2004
- National Environmental Management Amendment Act 62 of 2008 from 1 May 2009: Section 1, 24, 42-43, 47
  - Also amends Environment Conservation Act 73 of 1989
  - Also amends National Environment Laws Amendment Act 44 of 2008
  - Also amends National Environment Management: Air Quality Act 39 of 2004
- National Environmental Management Laws Amendment Act 14 of 2009: Section 1, 3, 11, 13, 15-16, 22, 28, 30-31, 34, Schedule 3
  - Also amends Environment Conservation Act 73 of 1989
  - Also amends National Environmental Management: Protected Areas Act 57 of 2003
  - Also amends National Environmental Management: Biodiversity Act 10 of 2004
  - Also amends National Environment Management: Air Quality Act 39 of 2004
- National Environmental Management Laws 2nd Amendment Act 30 of 2013 from 18 December 2014: Section 16, 23, 24, 30
- National Environmental Management Laws Second Amendment Act 30 of 2013 from 18 December 2013
- National Environmental Management Laws Amendment Act 25 of 2014 from 2 September 2014
  - Also amends National Environmental Management Amendment Act 62 of 2008
  - Also amends National Environmental Management: Waste Act 59 of 2008

== See also ==
- National Environmental Management: Protected Areas Act, 57 of 2003
- National Environmental Management: Biodiversity Act 10 of 2004
- National Environmental Management: Air Quality Act 39 of 2004
- National Environmental Management: Integrated Coastal Management Act 24 of 2008
