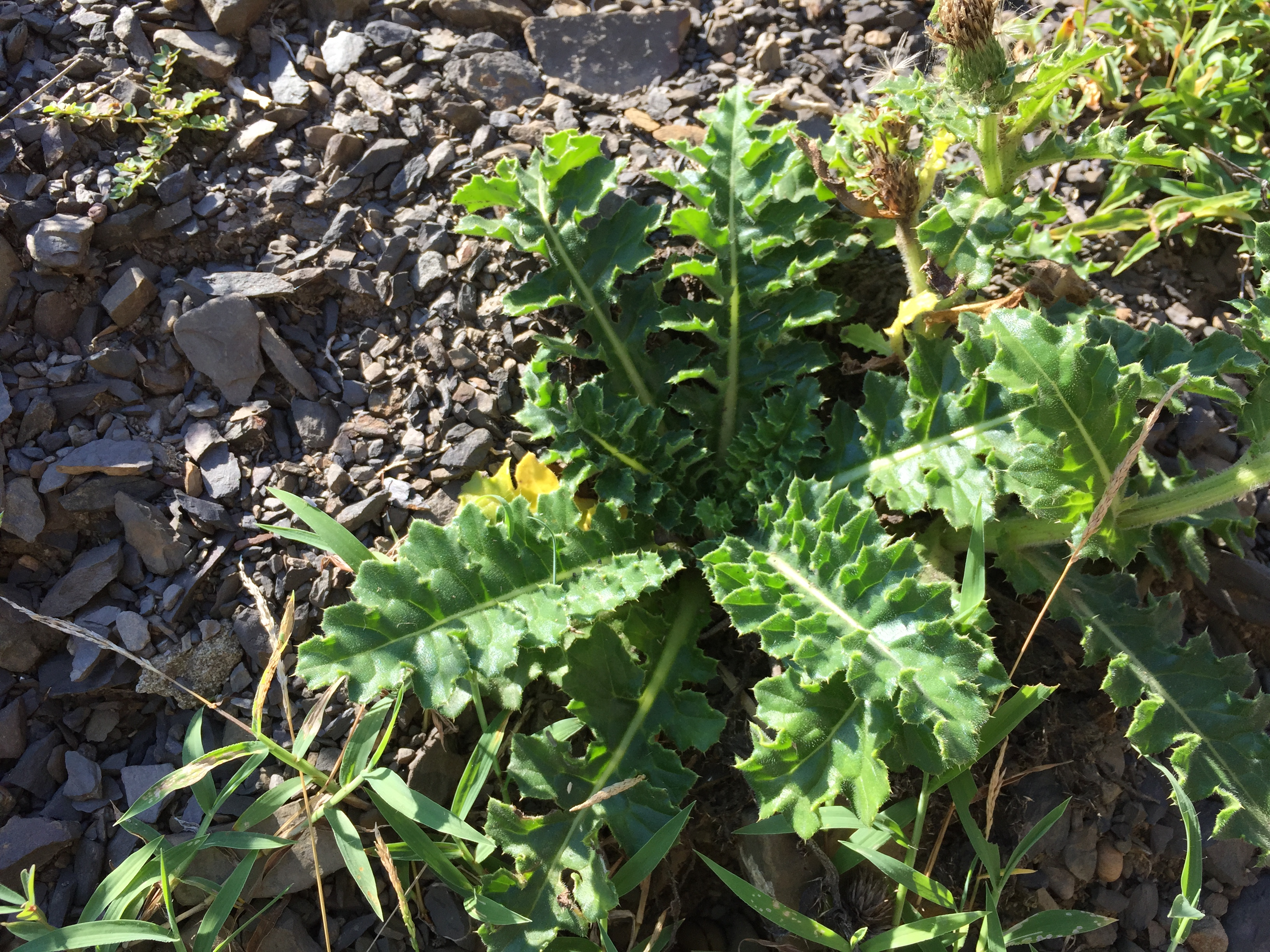

Scientific classification
- Kingdom: Plantae
- Clade: Embryophytes
- Clade: Tracheophytes
- Clade: Spermatophytes
- Clade: Angiosperms
- Clade: Eudicots
- Clade: Asterids
- Order: Asterales
- Family: Asteraceae
- Genus: Cirsium
- Species: C. japonicum DC.
- Variety: C. j. var. japonicum

Trinomial name
- Cirsium japonicum var. japonicum

Synonyms
- Synonymy: Alfredia japonica Miq. (1866); Cirsium belingschanicum Petr. ex Hand.-Mazz. (1926); Cirsium bodinieri (Vaniot) H.Lév. (1913); Cirsium cerberus (Vaniot) H.Lév. (1913); Cirsium hainanense Masam. (1943); Cirsium ibukiense Nakai (1932); Cirsium japonicum f. albiflorum G.Y.Li & D.Y.Ou (2010), nom. illeg.; Cirsium japonicum f. albiflorum Akasawa (1977); Cirsium japonicum var. australe Kitam. (1931); Cirsium japonicum var. fukienense Kitam. (1932); Cirsium japonicum f. fukienense (Kitam.) Kitam. (1990); Cirsium japonicum var. horridum Nakai (1911); Cirsium japonicum var. ibukiense (Nakai) Nakai ex Kitam. (1937); Cirsium japonicum var. intermedium (Maxim.) Matsum. (1912); Cirsium japonicum var. kiusianum (Nakai) Nemoto (1936); Cirsium japonicum f. leucanthum Nakai (1911); Cirsium japonicum f. nakaianum (H.Lév. & Vaniot) W.Lee (1996); Cirsium japonicum var. nakaianum (H.Lév. & Vaniot) Kitam. (1931); Cirsium japonicum var. takaoense Kitam. (1932); Cirsium japonicum var. villosum Kadota (1995); Cirsium japonicum var. vulcani Nakai (1911); Cirsium kawakamii Hayata (1911); Cirsium kitagoense Nakai (1950); Cirsium kiusianum Nakai (1912); Cirsium lacinulatum Nakai (1932); Cirsium maackii var. horridum (Nakai) Nakai (1912); Cirsium maackii var. intermedium (Maxim.) Nakai (1912); Cirsium maackii var. kiusianum (Nakai) Nakai (1932); Cirsium maackii var. nakaianum (H.Lév. & Vaniot) Nakai (1911); Cirsium maackii var. taquetii Nakai (1911); Cirsium maackii var. vulcani (Nakai) Nakai (1912); Cirsium nakaianum (H.Lév. & Vaniot) Nakai (1912); Cirsium senile Nakai (1932); Cirsium smithianum Petr. (1943); Cirsium taquetii Nakai (1912); Cirsium xanthacanthum Nakai (1932); Cnicus bodinieri Vaniot (1903); Cnicus cerberus Vaniot (1903); Cnicus japonicus var. intermedius Maxim. (1873); Cnicus nakaianus H.Lév. & Vaniot (1910); Cnicus taquetii H.Lév. & Vaniot (1910)

= Cirsium japonicum var. japonicum =

Species of plant

Cirsium japonicum var. japonicum is a flowering plant in the family Asteraceae. It is a perennial thistle native to Japan, Korea, China, Taiwan, and Vietnam. It is a variety of Cirsium japonicum, and is known by many synonyms. In Chinese it is known as the Yushan thistle (Chinese: 玉山薊), named for Yushan mountain on Taiwan.

== Uses ==
Cirsium japonicum var. japonicum is cultivated for medicinal properties, particularly in Puli and Ren'ai Townships of Nantou County on Taiwan. C. japonicum var. japonicum was believed to be depicted on the reverse side of the NT$1000 bill, near the bottom left corner, but in 2019, botanists reclassified the depicted plant as a new species, C. tatakaense.

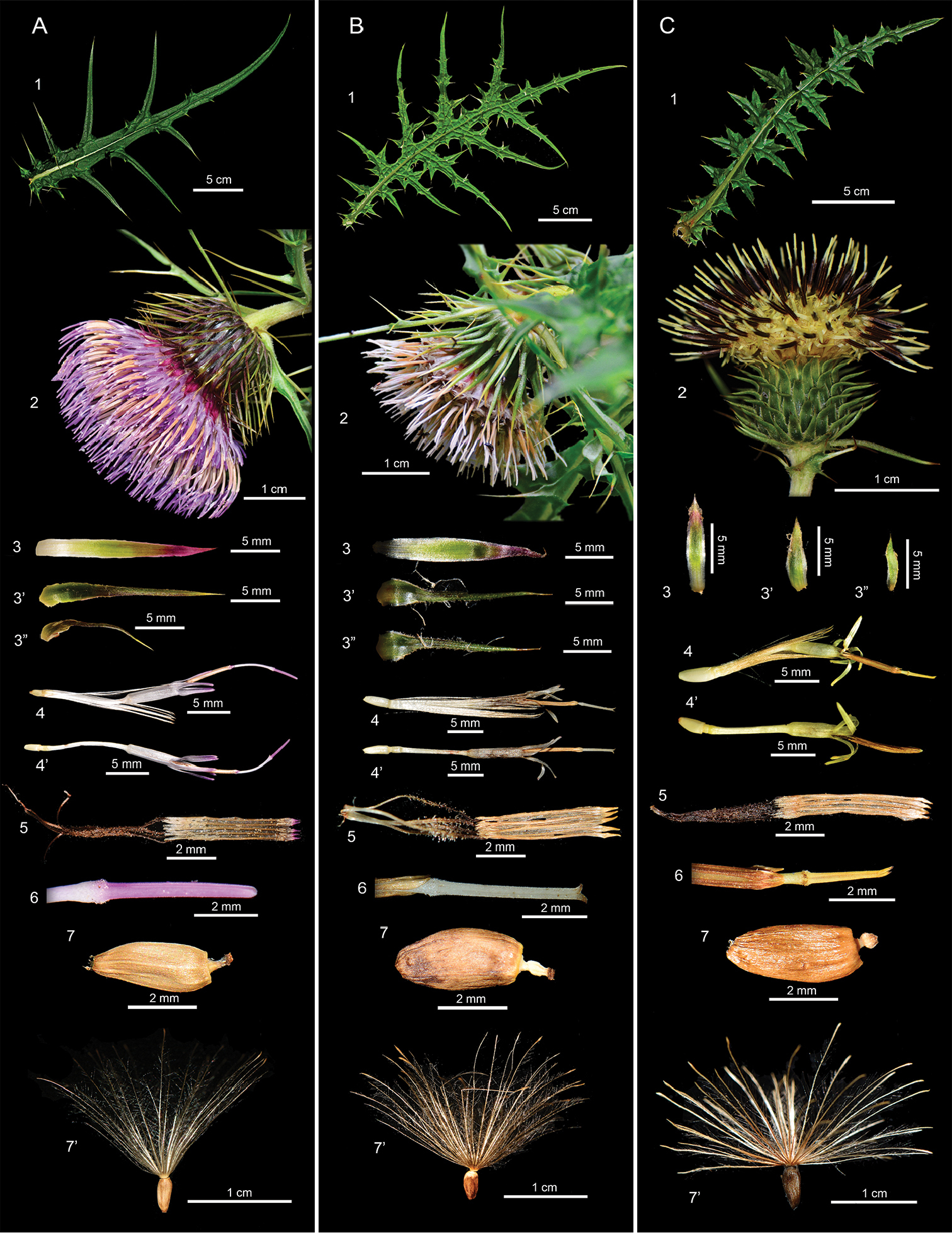
Comparison between C. tatakaense (left), C. japonicum var. japonicum (as C. kawakamii, center), and C. arisanense (right).

== Biology ==
Cirsium japonicum var. japonicum typically flowers between September and October, and bears fruit between October and November.

== Distribution ==
The variety ranges from Japan and Korea through China, Taiwan, and Vietnam. In Taiwan it is sometimes known by the synonym C. kawakamii, and grows in alpine grasslands of north-central Taiwan between 1,500 and 3,500 meters elevation.
