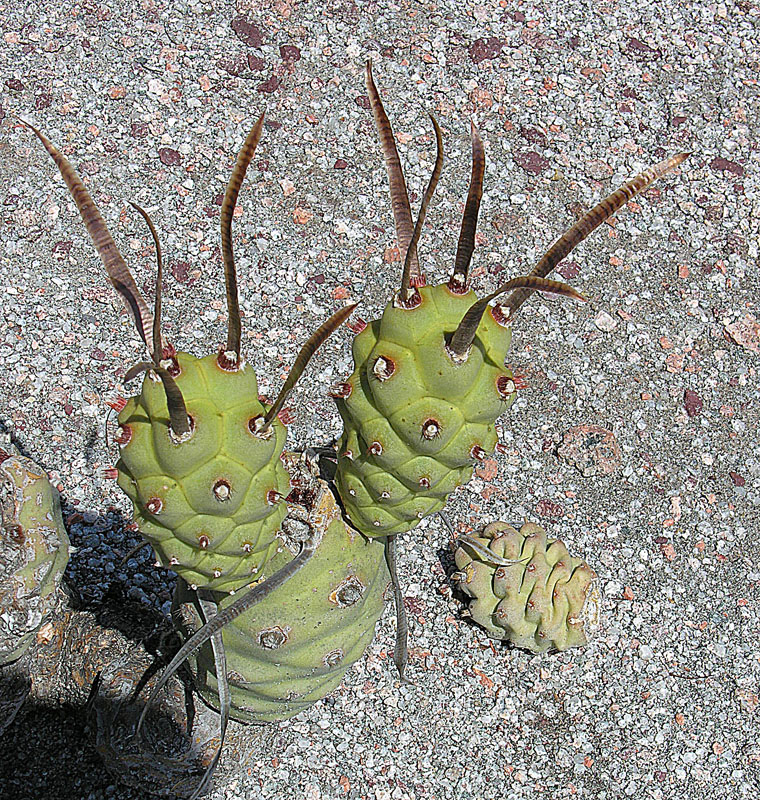
- Tephrocactus articulatus in La Rioja Province, Argentina

Scientific classification
- Kingdom: Plantae
- Clade: Tracheophytes
- Clade: Angiosperms
- Clade: Eudicots
- Order: Caryophyllales
- Family: Cactaceae
- Genus: Tephrocactus
- Species: T. articulatus

Binomial name
- Tephrocactus articulatus (Pfeiff.) Backeb.

Synonyms
- List: Cereus articulatus Pfeiff.; Cereus polymorphus C.F.Först.; Cereus syringscanthus Pfeiff.; Opuntia andicola var. fulvispina Lem.; Opuntia andicola Pfeiff.; Opuntia articulata (Pfeiff.) D.R.Hunt; Opuntia articulata Otto; Opuntia calva Lem.; Opuntia diademata var. calva (Lem.) F.A.C.Weber ex K.Schum.; Opuntia diademata var. inermis Speg.; Opuntia diademata var. oligacantha Speg.; Opuntia diademata var. polyacantha Speg.; Opuntia diademata Lem.; Opuntia glomerata var. calva (Lem.) G.D.Rowley; Opuntia glomerata var. inermis (Speg.) G.D.Rowley; Opuntia glomerata var. polycantha (Speg.) G.D.Rowley; Opuntia glomerata f. papyracantha (Phil.) Castell.; Opuntia papyracantha K.Schum.; Opuntia papyracantha Phil.; Opuntia polymorpha Pfeiff.; Opuntia strobiliformis A.Berger; Opuntia syringacantha (Pfeiff.) C.F.Först.; Opuntia turpinii var. polymorpha Salm-Dyck; Opuntia turpinii Lem.; Tephrocactus andicola (Pfeiff.) Lem.; Tephrocactus articulatus var. calvus (Lem.) Backeb.; Tephrocactus articulatus var. diadematus (Lem.) Backeb.; Tephrocactus articulatus var. inermis (Speg.) Backeb.; Tephrocactus articulatus var. oligacanthus (Speg.) Backeb.; Tephrocactus articulatus var. papyracanthus (Phil.) Backeb.; Tephrocactus articulatus var. polyacanthus (Speg.) Backeb.; Tephrocactus articulatus var. syringacanthus (Pfeiff.) Backeb.; Tephrocactus articulatus f. papyracanthus (Phil.) Guiggi & Verloove; Tephrocactus articulatus f. syringacanthus (Pfeiff.) F.Ritter; Tephrocactus calvus (Lem.) Lem.; Tephrocactus diadematus var. calvus (Lem.) Backeb., C.Backeberg & F.M.Knuth; Tephrocactus diadematus (Lem.) Lem.; Tephrocactus glomeratus var. andicola (Pfeiff.) Backeb.; Tephrocactus glomeratus var. fulvispinus (Lem.) Backeb.; Tephrocactus glomeratus var. inermis Speg.; Tephrocactus inermis (Speg.) Backeb.; Tephrocactus neoglomeratus var. andicola (Pfeiff.) Y.Itô; Tephrocactus neoglomeratus var. fulvispinus (Lem.) Y.Itô; Tephrocactus strobiliformis (A.Berger) Backeb., C.Backeberg & F.M.Knuth; Tephrocactus turpinii (Lem.) Lem.

= Tephrocactus articulatus =

Species of cactus

Tephrocactus articulatus is a species of cactus in the subfamily Opuntioideae of the plant family Cactaceae, endemic to northern Argentina.

== Description ==
It is a small shrubby cactus growing 40 cm (16 in) tall with white flowers. The branches are typically made up of around eight segments, each segment 3–15 cm (1.2–5.9 in) long and 3–4 cm (1.2–1.6 in) broad. Its most notable feature are its spines which, if present, are flat and resemble parchment. The flowers open at end-of-evening nautical twilight, and close shortly after sunrise.

== Taxonomy ==
The species, as with the rest of the genus Tephrocactus, was formerly often included in a wide view of Opuntia. The species is variable, and two varieties are sometimes accepted based on the number of spines, though intermediates occur, and they are not considered distinct by the Plants of the World Online database:

- Tephrocactus articulatus var. articulatus. Few or no spines.
- Tephrocactus articulatus var. oligacanthus. Numerous broad, flat spines of papery appearance.
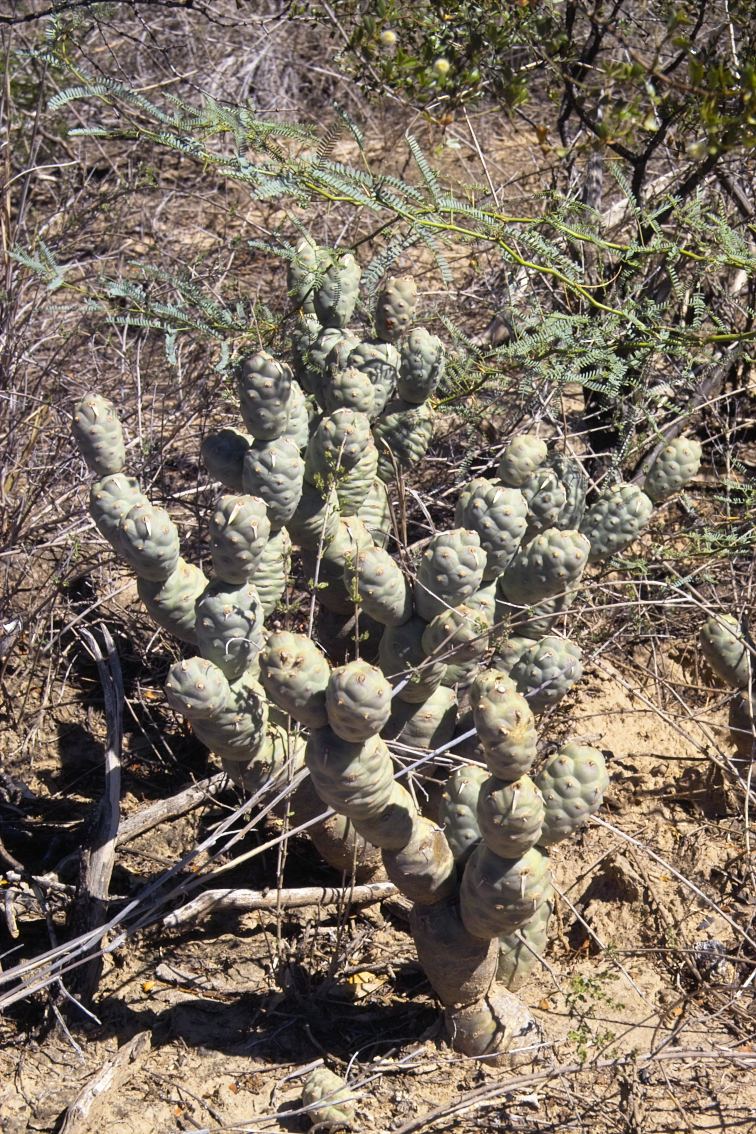
Spineless specimen, Serrezuela, Córdoba Province, Argentina

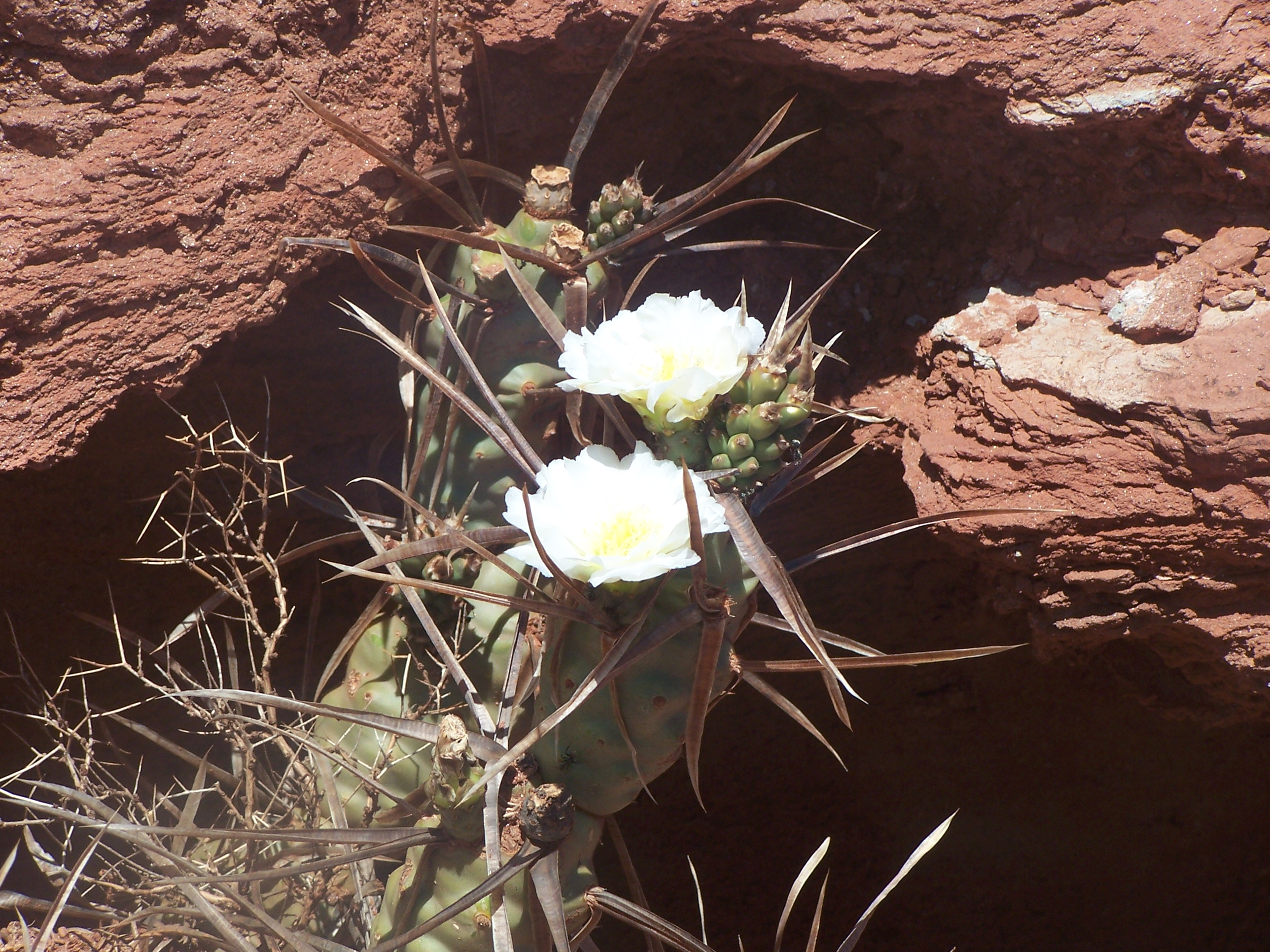
Spined specimen, Argentina

== Cultivation ==
Propagation is usually through cuttings. Stem segments break away easily and will root readily without special treatment. It also grows from seeds.
