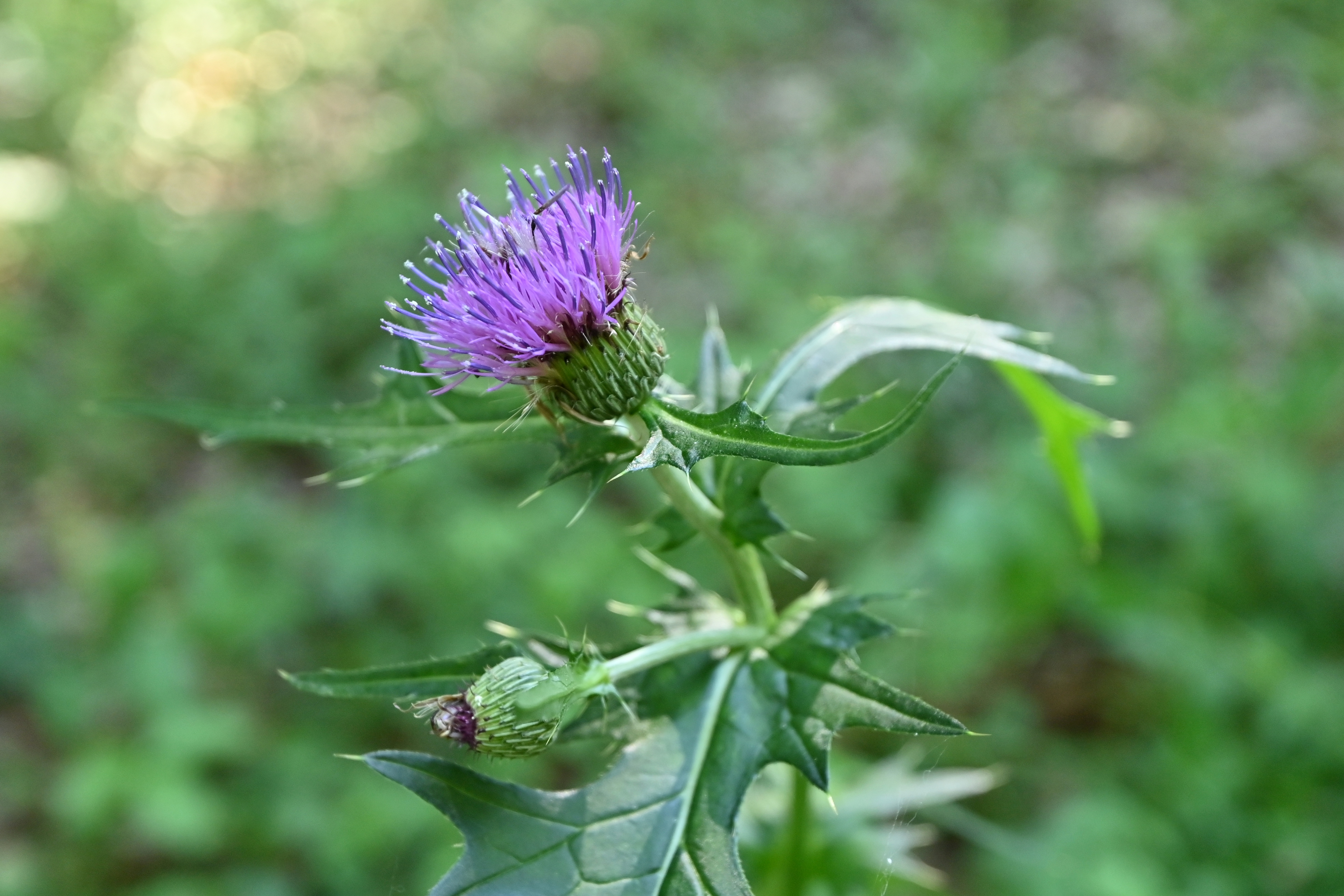

Scientific classification
- Kingdom: Plantae
- Clade: Tracheophytes
- Clade: Angiosperms
- Clade: Eudicots
- Clade: Asterids
- Order: Asterales
- Family: Asteraceae
- Genus: Cirsium
- Species: C. japonicum

Binomial name
- Cirsium japonicum DC. (1838)

Varieties
- Cirsium japonicum f. arakii (Kitam.) Kitam.; Cirsium japonicum var. diabolicum (Kitam.) Kadota; Cirsium japonicum var. japonicum; Cirsium japonicum var. maritimum Konta & Katsuy.; Cirsium japonicum var. vestitum Kitam.

Synonyms
- Carduus eriophorus Thunb. (1784), nom. illeg., later homonym; Carduus japonicus (DC.) Franch. (1883); Cnicus japonicus (DC.) Maxim. (1874)

= Cirsium japonicum =

Species of flowering plant

Cirsium japonicum, commonly known as Japanese thistle, plumed thistle, or sea thistle, is a species of flowering plant in the sunflower family, Asteraceae. It is a perennial thistle native to eastern Asia, ranging from Japan to Korea, China, Taiwan, and Vietnam.

== Varieties ==
Five varieties are accepted.

- Cirsium japonicum f. arakii (Kitam.) Kitam. – Japan
- Cirsium japonicum var. diabolicum (Kitam.) Kadota – Japan (Honshu)
- Cirsium japonicum var. japonicum – China, Japan, Korea, Taiwan, and Vietnam
- Cirsium japonicum var. maritimum Konta & Katsuy. – Japan (Honshu)
- Cirsium japonicum var. vestitum Kitam. – Japan (Honshu and Shikoku)
