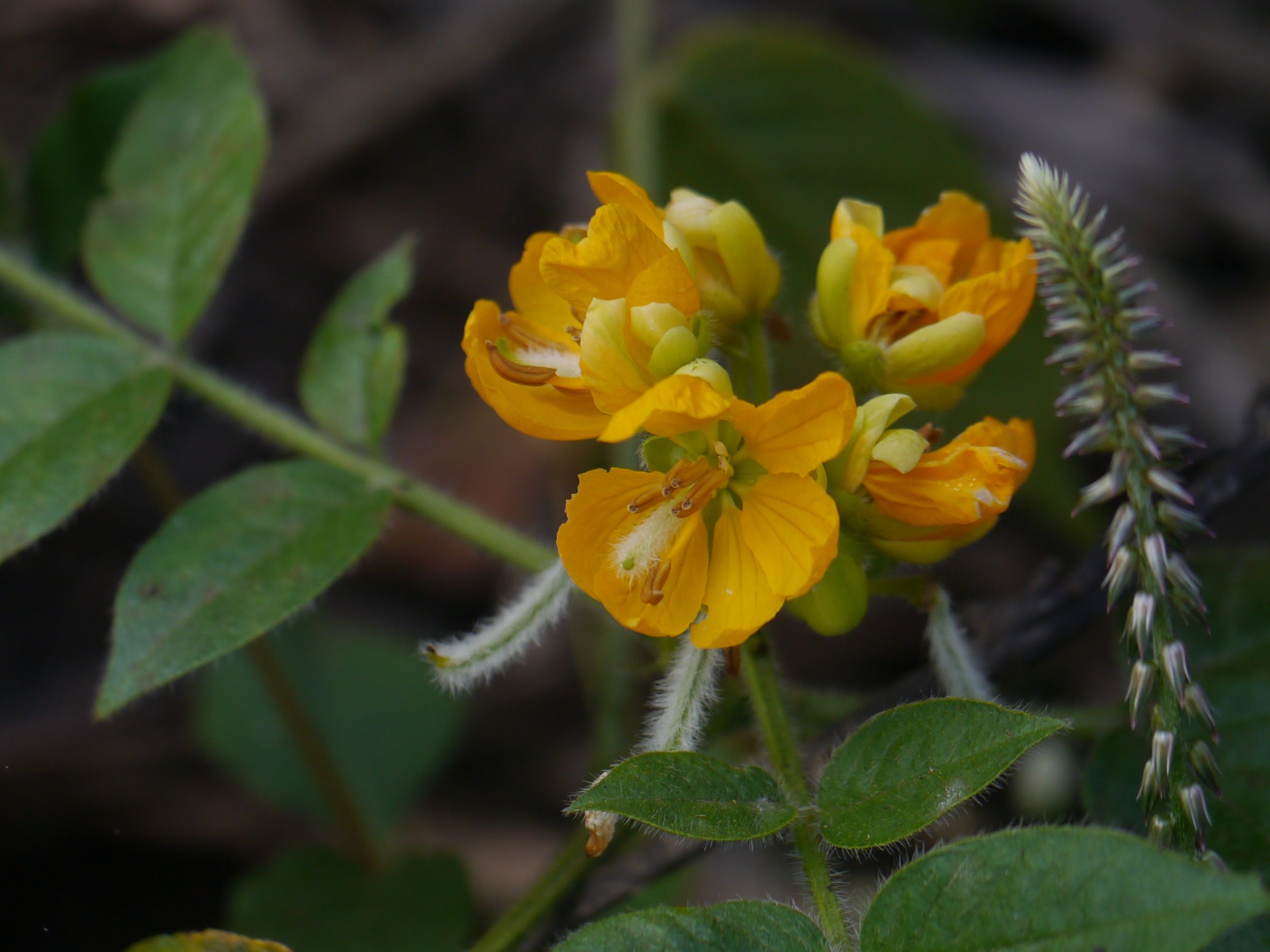

Scientific classification
- Kingdom: Plantae
- Clade: Tracheophytes
- Clade: Angiosperms
- Clade: Eudicots
- Clade: Rosids
- Order: Fabales
- Family: Fabaceae
- Subfamily: Caesalpinioideae
- Genus: Senna
- Species: S. hirsuta

Binomial name
- Senna hirsuta (L.) H.S.Irwin & Barneby

Synonyms
- Cassia hirsuta L.; Ditremexa hirsuta (L.) Britton & Rose

= Senna hirsuta =

Species of plant

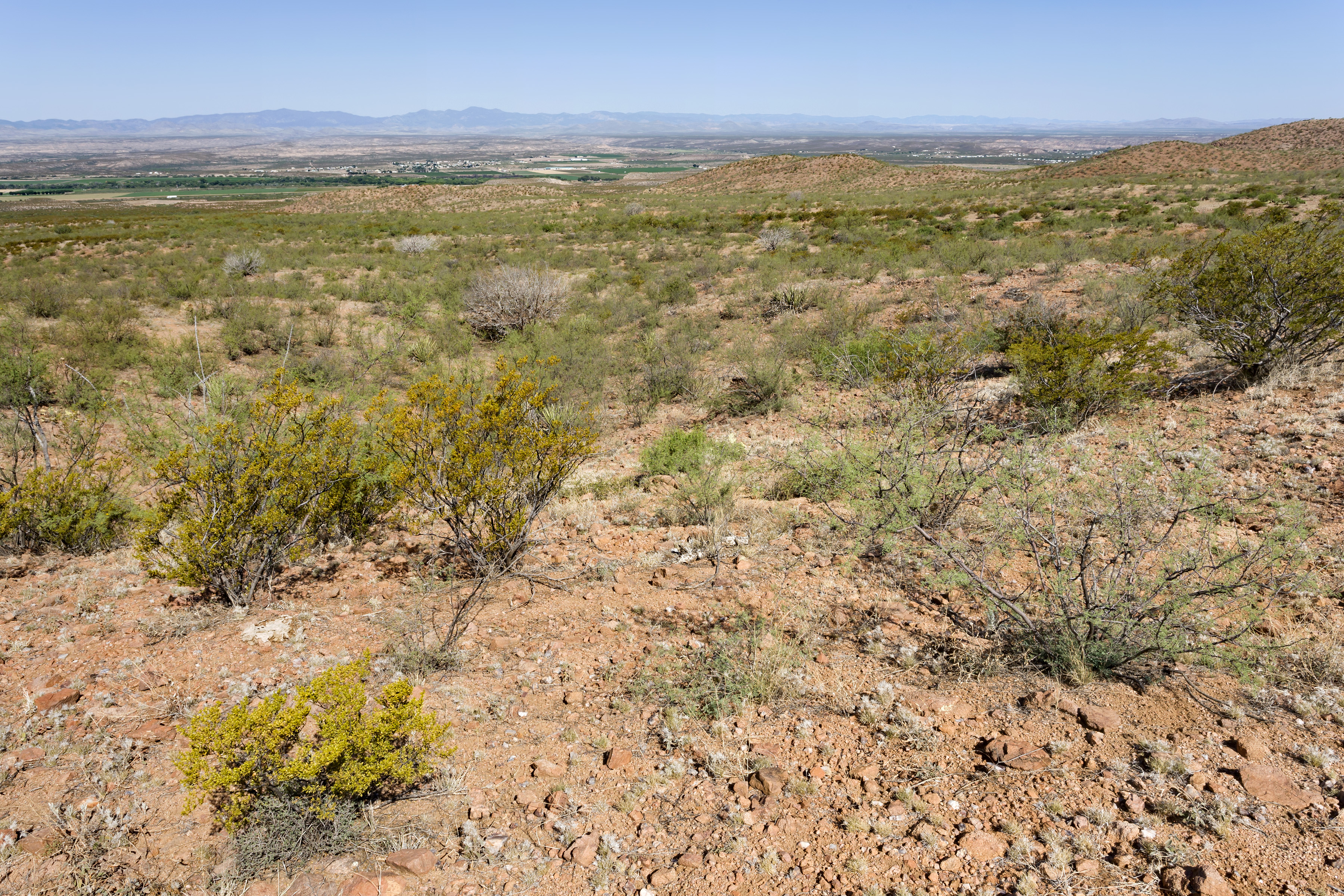
Habit in the Caballo Mountains

Senna hirsuta, commonly known as woolly senna, is a species of flowering plant in the family Fabaceae and is native to Central and South America, but is naturalised in many other countries. It is an erect or spreading shrub or herbaceous perennial with pinnate leaves, with two to six pairs of egg-shaped leaflets, and yellow flowers arranged in groups of two to six, with six fertile stamens and four staminodes in each flower.

== Description ==
Senna hirsuta is an erect or spreading shrub or herbaceous perennial that typically grows to a height of up to 2.5 m (8 ft 2 in). Its leaves are pinnate, 100–160 mm (3.9–6.3 in) long on a petiole 40–65 mm (1.6–2.6 in) long, usually with two to six pairs of egg-shaped leaflets, sometimes with the narrower end towards the base. The leaflets are 40–90 mm (1.6–3.5 in) long and 20–35 mm (0.79–1.38 in) wide, usually spaced 20–40 mm (0.79–1.57 in) apart. There is a sessile gland at the base of the petiole. The flowers are yellow and arranged on the ends of branches and in upper leaf axils in groups of two to five on a peduncle about 10 mm (0.39 in) long, each flower on a pedicel 12–20 mm (0.47–0.79 in) long. The petals are 12–16 mm (0.47–0.63 in) long and there are six fertile stamens, the anthers 3–8 mm (0.12–0.31 in) long and of different lengths, as well as four staminodes. Flowering occurs in most months, and the fruit is a flattened cylindrical pod 100–140 mm (3.9–5.5 in) long, 4–6 mm (0.16–0.24 in) wide and curved.

== Taxonomy and naming ==
This species was first formally described in 1753 by Carl Linnaeus who gave it the name Cassia hirsuta in Species Plantarum. In 1979, Howard Samuel Irwin and Rupert Charles Barneby transferred the species to the genus Senna as S. hirsuta in the journal Phytologia. The specific epithet (hirsuta) means "hairy".

In the same journal, Irwin and Barneby described seven varieties of S. hirsuta, and the names are accepted by Plants of the World Online:

- Senna hirsuta var. acuminata (Benth.) H.S.Irwin & Barneby (previously known as Cassia neglecta var. acuminata Benth.)
- Senna hirsuta var. glaberrima (M.E.Jones) H.S.Irwin & Barneby (previously known as Cassia leptocarpa var. glaberrima M.E.Jones)
- Senna hirsuta var. hirsuta
- Senna hirsuta var. hirta (Benth.) H.S.Irwin & Barneby (previously known as Cassia leptocarpa var. hirsuta Benth.)
- Senna hirsuta var. leptocarpa (Benth.) H.S.Irwin & Barneby (previously known as Cassia leptocarpa Benth.)
- Senna hirsuta var. puberula H.S.Irwin & Barneby
- Senna hirsuta var. streptocarpa H.S.Irwin & Barneby

== Distribution ==
Senna hirsuta is native to most countries in South America, to Nicaragua, Honduras and Cuba in Central America, and to Arizona, New Mexico, Mexico and Puerto Rico in North America. It is also naturalised in countries in Africa, South Asia, Southeast Asia and in Queensland in Australia.

Variety acuminata is only found in south-east Brazil, var. glaberrima to Arizona and New Mexico (but naturalised in northwest Mexico), and var. leptocarpa is native to southeast Brazil, Colombia and Paraguay
