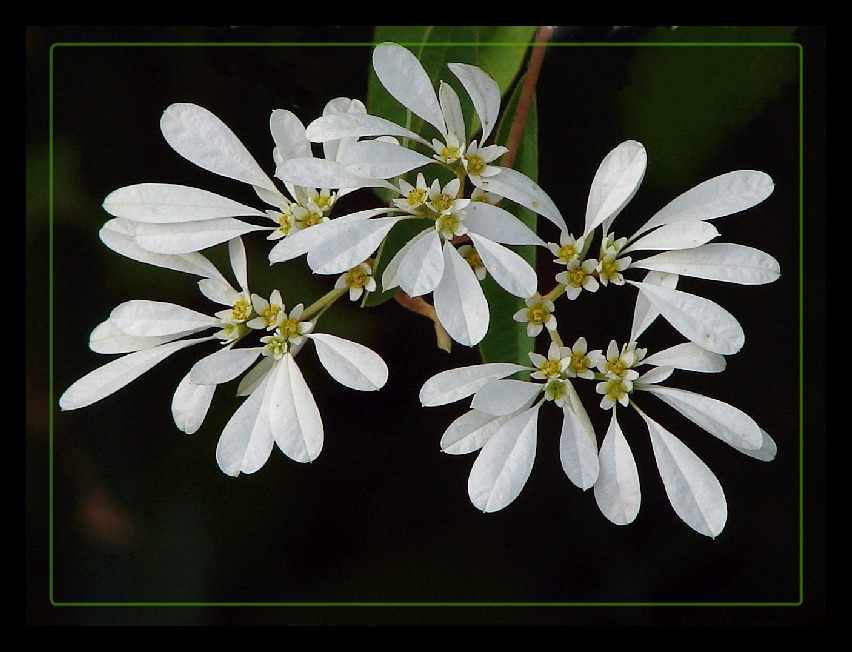

Conservation status
- Least Concern (IUCN 3.1)"Euphorbia leucocephala". IUCN Red List of Threatened Species. doi:10.2305/IUCN.UK.2022-1.RLTS.T205089331A205616890.en.

Scientific classification
- Kingdom: Plantae
- Clade: Tracheophytes
- Clade: Angiosperms
- Clade: Eudicots
- Clade: Rosids
- Order: Malpighiales
- Family: Euphorbiaceae
- Genus: Euphorbia
- Species: E. leucocephala

Binomial name
- Euphorbia leucocephala Lotsy

= Euphorbia leucocephala =

Species of flowering plant

Euphorbia leucocephala, with many common names including little Christmas flower, white lace euphorbia, snow bush, snow flake, snows of Kilimanjaro and white Christmas bush is a species of plant in the family Euphorbiaceae. It is endemic to Mexico and Mesoamerica, and a relative of the poinsettia. Its clear sap is an irritant that can cause blisters and skin rashes. Ingesting it can cause vomiting and diarrhea.
