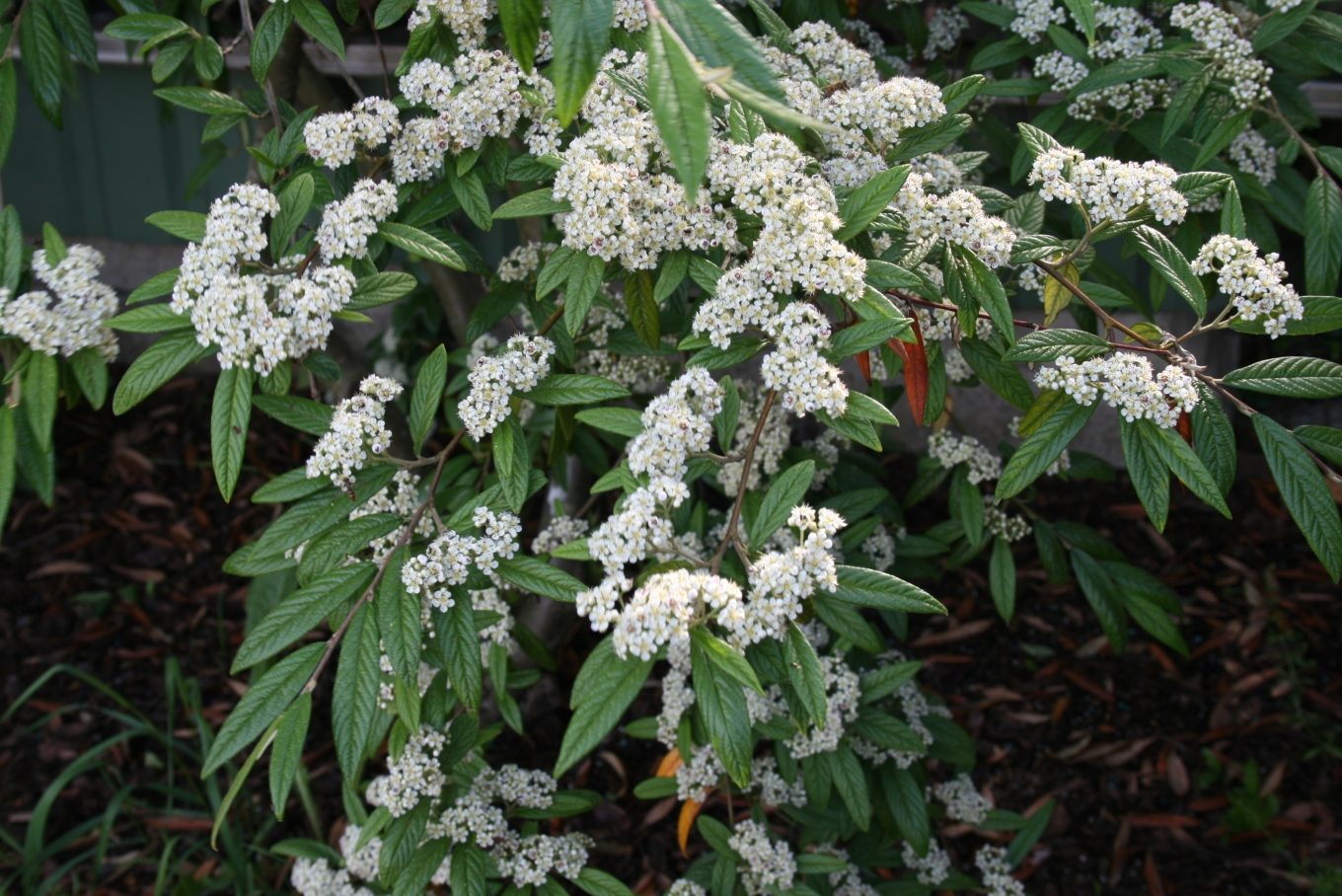

Scientific classification
- Kingdom: Plantae
- Clade: Tracheophytes
- Clade: Angiosperms
- Clade: Eudicots
- Clade: Rosids
- Order: Rosales
- Family: Rosaceae
- Genus: Cotoneaster
- Species: C. salicifolius

Binomial name
- Cotoneaster salicifolius Franch.

= Cotoneaster salicifolius =

Species of flowering plant

Cotoneaster salicifolius, the willow-leaved cotoneaster, is a drought-tolerant, evergreen to semi-evergreen, low-lying, small to medium-sized shrub with an arched branching habit. Specimens growing in the wild, however, are generally larger, averaging five meters in height. Although native to the mountains, mixed forests, and open places in western China, it is commonly cultivated in temperate climates worldwide. Cultivars have been bred in a variety of forms, as ornamental groundcovers or shrubs.

== Description ==
The bark of the willow-leaved cotoneaster is gray-brown, its stems are thin, and its root system is sparse.

The leaves are alternate, simple, long, lanceolate, dark green and resemble those of willow trees (thus the common name), and have fine gray hairs on their undersides. The scientific name 'salicifolius', described by the botanist Franchet, means 'with leaves like willows' (see: Genus Salix). During the colder months, they turn maroonish in color.

In June it bears many flowered, compound corymbs of white, 5–6 mm flowers. The fruit grow as small, showy, apple-like, red pomes, ripening in September to October, and enduring into the winter.

The diploid chromosomal number is 34 (2n=34).

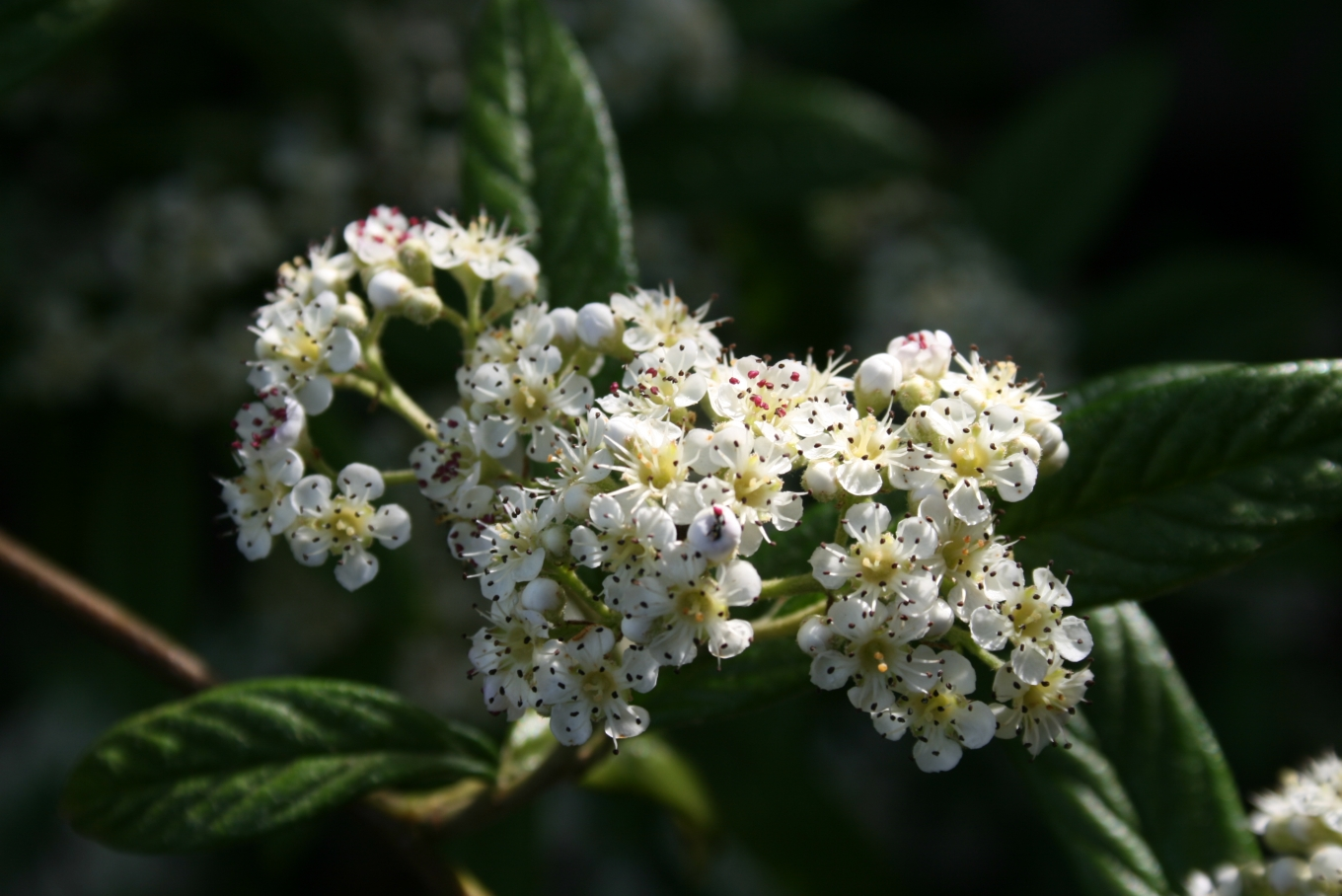
Corymb

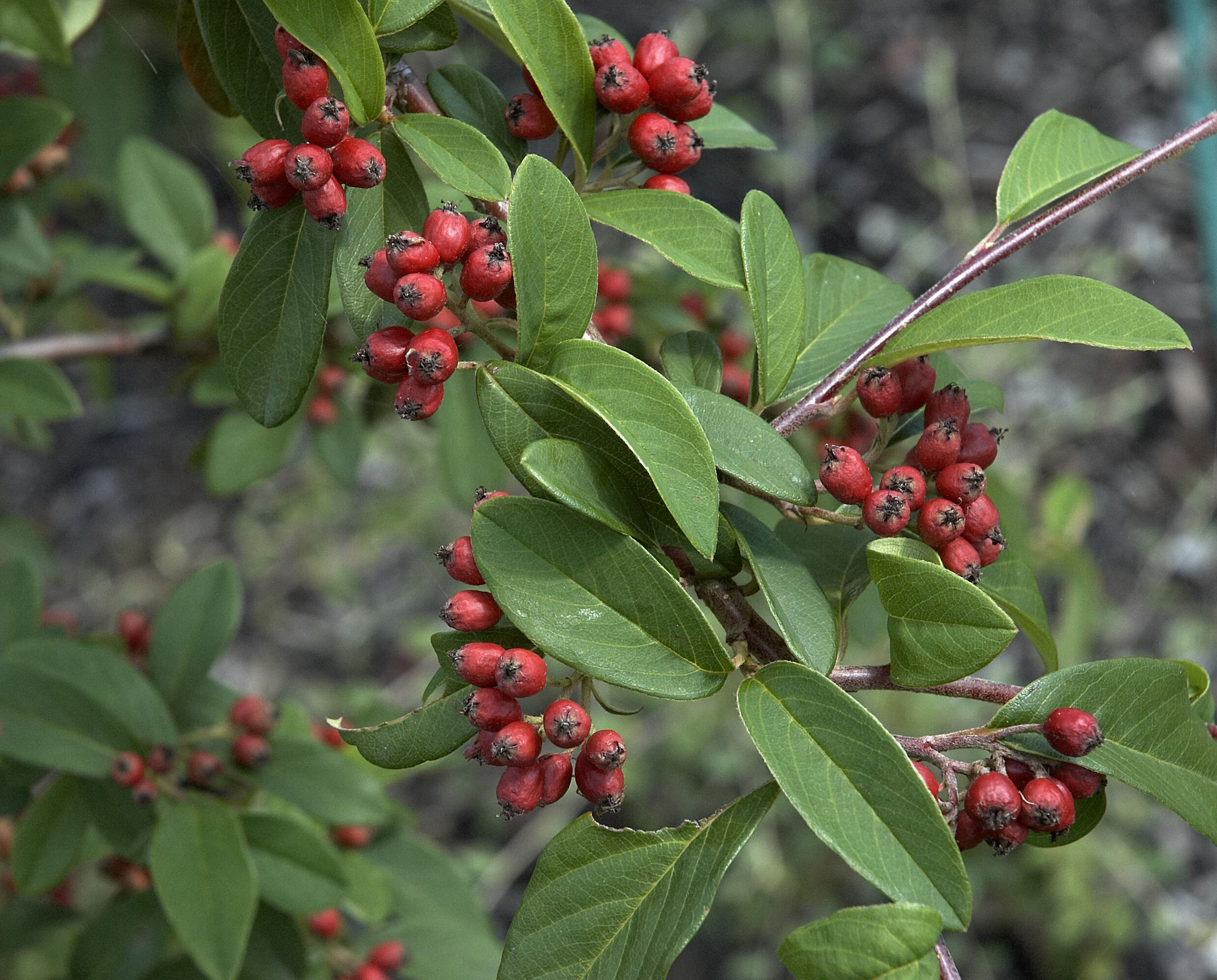
Fruit

== Cultivation ==
Depending on the characteristics of the cultivar, the Willow-leaved Cotoneaster can be used as a hedge or screen; a bank cover; in small groupings or large masses; or anywhere its colorful fall foliage or bright red fruit would direct the eye towards a focal point, or serve as a centerpiece in a garden setting.

=== Pests ===
Cotoneaster salicifolius is susceptible to bouts with leaf spot, scale insects and spider mites. It is also considered highly susceptible to the Enterobacteria fire blight and has been used as a test species to trial new methods of control. In parts of Europe where fire blight was previously unknown, cultivated specimens of this species are among the first plants identified as infected.

== List of cultivars ==
This plant has many cultivars, ranging from tiny groundcovers to large shrubs, which include:-

- 'Angustus'
- 'Autumn Fire' or 'Herbstfeuer' (German): it grows 2 to 3 feet tall
- 'Avonbank'
- 'Avondrood': equivalent to, or thought to be equivalent to 'Repandens' and 'Repens'
- 'Dekor'
- 'Dortmund': thought to be equivalent to 'Repandens' and 'Repens', and possibly to 'Avondrood'
- 'Emerald Carpet' or 'Green Carpet': a cultivar with denser than average foliage, it is similar to 'Repens'
- 'Exburyensis'
- 'Floccosus'
- 'Gnom' or 'Gnome': it grows 8 to 12 inches tall
- 'Henryanus'
- 'Herbstfeuer' (German) or 'Autumn Fire': a cultivar that virtually lies on the ground and stands less than a foot high
- 'HQ' : similar to "Repens"
- 'Klampen'
- 'Moner': developed in Monrovia, it is thought to be the same as 'Emerald Carpet'. It grows about a foot high, and spreads 6 to 8 feet, with a compact growth habit.
- 'Mlynany
- 'October Glory'
- 'Parkteppich'
- 'Pendulus' or 'Hybridus Pendulus'
- 'Perkeo'
- 'Pink Champagne'
- 'Red Flare'
- 'Repens' or 'Repandens' or 'Avondrood': this cultivar grows low to the ground to about 2 feet high and 8 feet wide with glossy leaves that may be semi-evergreen during excessively cold winters, but evergreen in warmer climes
- 'Rothschildianus'
- 'Rugosus' or 'Hylmoei'
- 'Saldam'
- 'Salicifolius'
- 'Scarlet Leader': this popular, disease-resistant cultivar is ground-hugging and makes a good groundcover. In the autumn the dense, green foliage russets. It grows 2 to 3 feet tall, and 6 to 8 feet wide.
- 'September Beauty'
- 'Sympatie'
- 'Valkenburg'
- 'Willeke'

Additional list sources :

The cultivars 'Gnom', 'Pink Champagne', and 'Rothschildianus' have received the Royal Horticultural Society's Award of Garden Merit.
