= Medlar (disambiguation) =

Medlar (Mespilus germanica) is a large shrub or small tree cultivated for its edible fruits.

Medlar or medlars may also refer to:

== Plants ==
- Mespilus or medlars, a genus of plants
- Mespilus canescens, Stern's medlar, a close relative of the cultivated medlar, in family Rosaceae
- Crataegus azarolus, azarole or Mediterranean medlar, in family Rosaceae
- Eriobotrya, a genus formerly included in Mespilus
- Eriobotrya japonica, the Japanese medlar or loquat, formerly called Mespilus japonica
- Mimusops elengi, medlar or bullet wood, a tree native to Asia and Australia, in family Sapotaceae
- Vangueria infausta, the African medlar, in family Rubiaceae
- Wolfberry (Lycium species), also called red medlar, in family Solanaceae

== Places ==
- Medlar Field at Lubrano Park, a baseball stadium in University Park, Pennsylvania
- Medlar-with-Wesham, a civil parish on the Fylde in Lancashire, England

== People ==
- Medlar (musician) (born 1986), British Deep house producer and DJ
- Bessica Medlar Raiche (1875–1932), American physician and aviator
- Linda Medlar (born 1949), subject of an Independent Counsel investigation during the first term of U.S. President Bill Clinton
- Martin Medlar (1899–1965), Irish Fianna Fáil politician

== Other uses ==
- MEDLARS, a computerized biomedical bibliographic retrieval system
- I Malavoglia or The House by the Medlar Tree, 1881 novel by Giovanni Verga

== See also ==
- Meddler (disambiguation)
- False medlar (Sorbus chamaemespilus), a deciduous shrub
- Medlar bodies, a skin condition
- Medlar Conservation Area, an area in Five Rivers MetroParks in Montgomery County, Ohio
