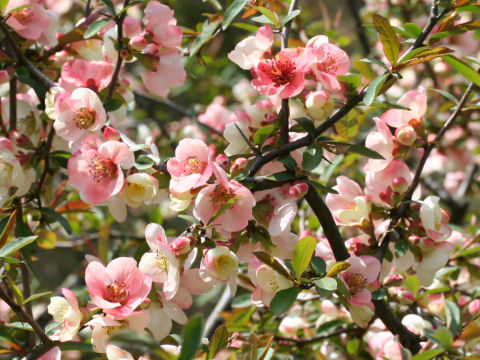

Conservation status
- Least Concern (IUCN 3.1)

Scientific classification
- Kingdom: Plantae
- Clade: Tracheophytes
- Clade: Angiosperms
- Clade: Eudicots
- Clade: Rosids
- Order: Rosales
- Family: Rosaceae
- Genus: Chaenomeles
- Species: C. cathayensis

Binomial name
- Chaenomeles cathayensis (Hemsl.) C.K.Schneid.

Synonyms
- Chaenomeles lagenaria var. cathayensis (Hemsl.) Rehder; Chaenomeles speciosa var. cathayensis (Hemsl.) H.Hara; Choenomeles cathayensis (Hemsl.) C.K.Schneid.; Cydonia cathayensis (Hemsl.) Hemsl.; Cydonia japonica var. cathayensis (Hemsl.) Cardot; Pyrus cathayensis Hemsl.; Chaenomeles lagenaria var. wilsonii Rehder; Chaenomeles speciosa var. wilsonii (Rehder) H.Hara; Cydonia cathayensis var. wilsonii Bean

= Chaenomeles cathayensis =

Species of flowering plant

Chaenomeles cathayensis is a species of flowering plant in the rose family, Rosaceae. It is native to China, Bhutan, and Myanmar. In Chinese, its common name is mùguā hǎitáng (木瓜海棠) or máo yè mùguā (毛葉木瓜).

This is a thorny deciduous shrub or tree growing up to 6 meters tall. The leaves are pointed, often toothed, and oval to lance-shaped. They are woolly-haired on the undersides, at least when new. The pink or white bell-shaped flowers are up to 4 centimeters wide. The fruit is a fragrant yellow-red pome 6 or 7 centimeters wide. Its habitats include slopes, forest margins and roadsides.

The plant is cultivated.
