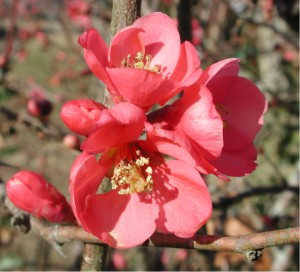
- Chaenomeles in flower, probably a cultivar of C. × superba

Scientific classification
- Kingdom: Plantae
- Clade: Tracheophytes
- Clade: Angiosperms
- Clade: Eudicots
- Clade: Rosids
- Order: Rosales
- Family: Rosaceae
- Subfamily: Amygdaloideae
- Tribe: Maleae
- Subtribe: Malinae
- Genus: Chaenomeles; Lindl.

Species
- Chaenomeles cathayensis Chaenomeles japonica Chaenomeles speciosa Chaenomeles thibetica

= Chaenomeles =

Genus of shrubs

Chaenomeles is a genus of four species of deciduous spiny shrubs, usually 1–3 m tall, in the family Rosaceae. They are native to Eastern Asia. These plants are related to the quince (Cydonia oblonga) and the Chinese quince (Pseudocydonia sinensis), differing in the serrated leaves that lack fuzz, and in the flowers, borne in clusters, having deciduous sepals and styles that are connate at the base.

The leaves are alternately arranged, simple, and have a serrated margin. The flowers are 3–4.5 cm diameter, with five petals, and are usually bright orange-red, but can be white or pink; flowering is in late winter or early spring. The fruit is a pome with five carpels; it ripens in late autumn.

Chaenomeles is used as a food plant by the larvae of some Lepidoptera species including the brown-tail and the leaf-miner Bucculatrix pomifoliella.

== Common names ==
Although all quince species have flowers, gardeners in the West often refer to these species as "flowering quince", since Chaenomeles are grown ornamentally for their flowers, not for their fruits. These plants have also been called "Japanese quince", and the name "japonica" (referring to C. japonica) was widely used for these plants in the 19th and 20th centuries, although this common name is not particularly distinctive, since japonica is a specific epithet shared by many other plants. The names "japonica" or "Japanese quince" were (and still are) often loosely applied to Chaenomeles in general, regardless of their species. The most commonly cultivated Chaenomeles referred to as "japonica" are actually the hybrid C. × superba and C. speciosa; C. japonica itself is not as commonly grown.

== Species and hybrids ==
Species accepted by the Plants of the World Online as of As of April 2023:

Flowers	Fruit	Scientific name	Common name	Distribution	Description
		Chaenomeles cathayensis		western China, Bhutan, and Burma	Has the largest fruit of the genus, pear-shaped, 10–15 cm long and 6–9 cm wide. The flowers are usually white or pink. The leaves are 7–14 cm long.
		Chaenomeles japonica	Maule's quince or Japanese quince	Japan	Has small fruit, apple-shaped, 3–4 cm diameter. The flowers are usually red, but can be white or pink. The leaves are 3–5 cm long.
		Chaenomeles speciosa	Chinese flowering quince; syn.: Chaenomeles laganaria, Cydonia lagenaria, Cydonia speciosa, Pyrus japonica	China and Korea	Has hard green apple-shaped fruit 5–6 cm diameter. The flowers are shades of red, white, or flecked with red and white. The leaves are 4–7 cm long.
		Chaenomeles thibetica	Tibetan quince; syn.: Pyrus xizangensis	south central China and Tibet	Has yellow oblong or pear-shaped fruit 5–9 cm diameter. The flowers are pink. The leaves are 4–7 cm long.

Four named hybrids have been bred in gardens. The most common is C. × superba (hybrid C. speciosa × C. japonica), while C. × vilmoriniana is a hybrid C. speciosa × C. cathayensis, and C. × clarkiana is a hybrid C. japonica × C. cathayensis. The hybrid C. × californica is a tri-species hybrid (C. × superba × C. cathayensis). Numerous named cultivars of all of these hybrids are available in the horticultural trade.

=== Uses ===
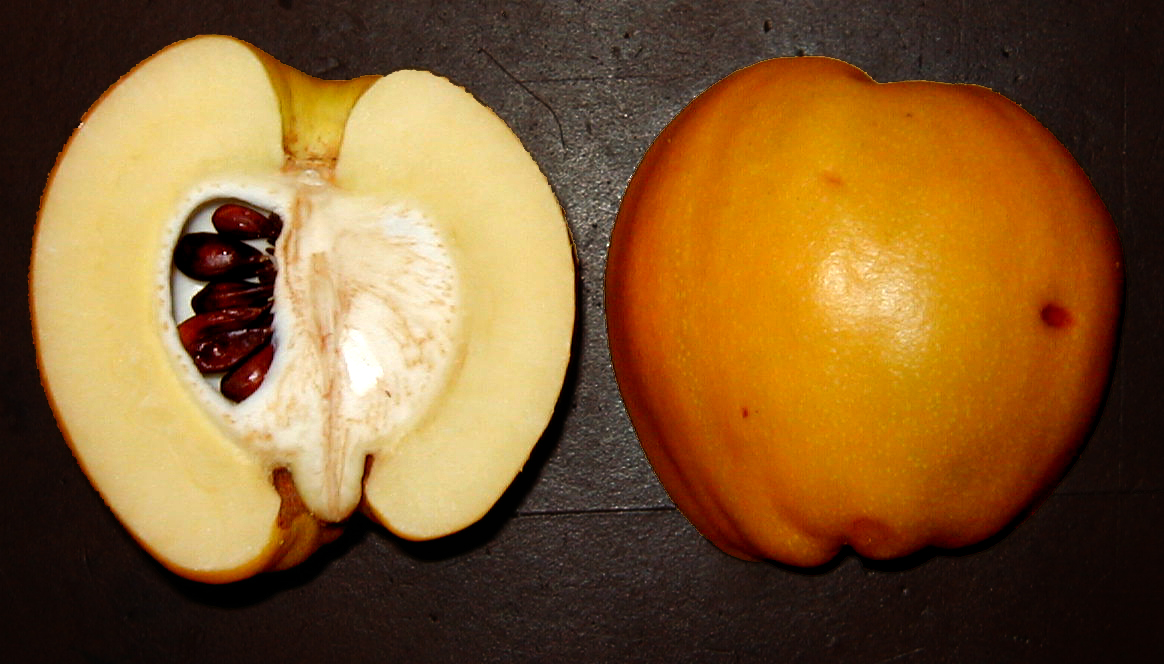
Chaenomeles japonica, bisected fruit

The species have become popular ornamental shrubs in parts of Europe and North America, grown in gardens both for their bright flowers and as a spiny barrier. Some cultivars grow up to 2 m tall, but others are much smaller and creeping. The fruits are hard and – although less astringent than quinces – are unpleasant to eat raw, tasting like an unripe apple with the acidity of a lemon, though they do soften and become less astringent after frost (via the process of bletting). The fruits are suitable for making liqueurs, as well as marmalade and preserves, as they contain more pectin than apples and true quinces. The tree is suitable for cultivation as a bonsai.
