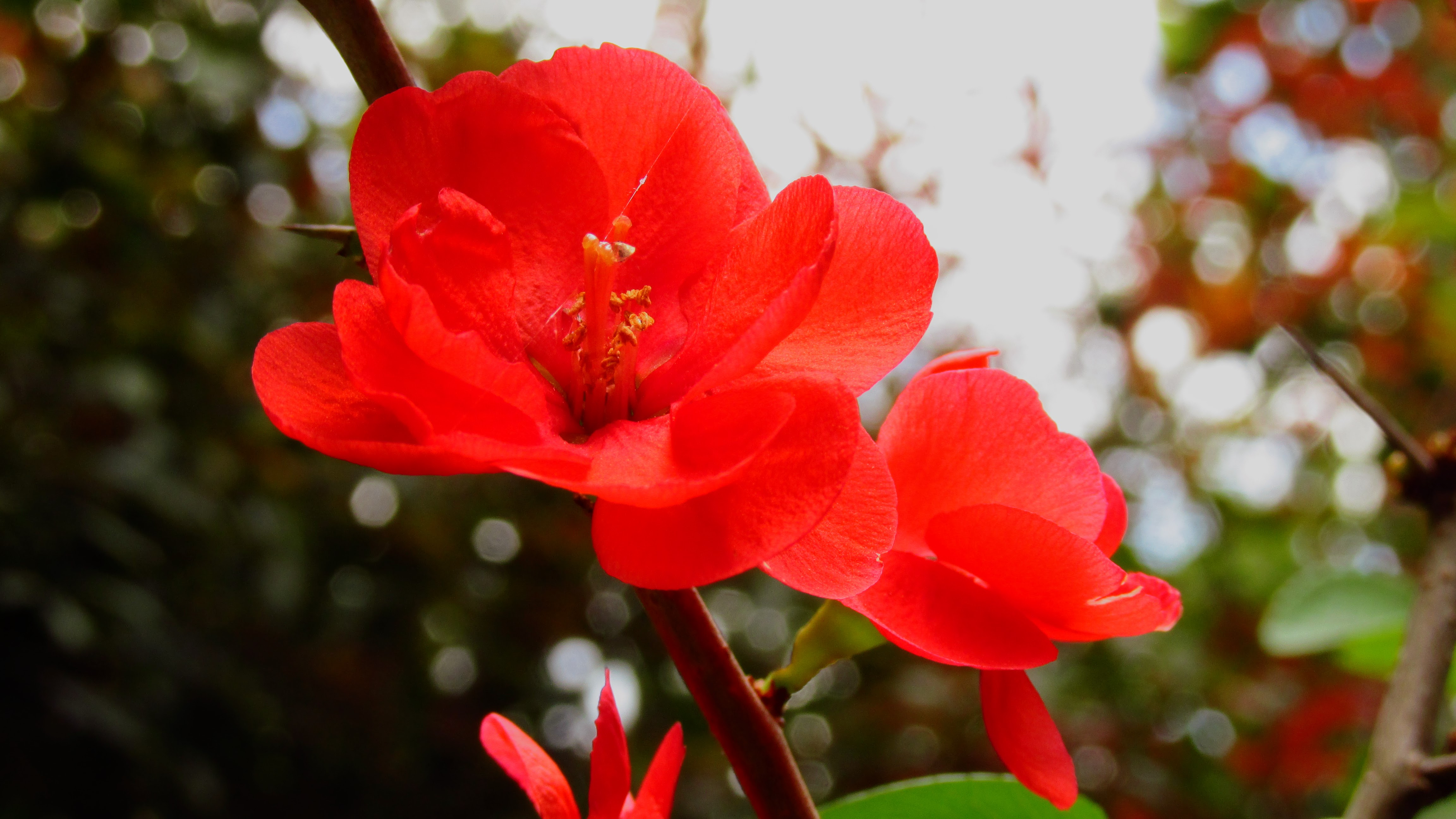

Scientific classification
- Kingdom: Plantae
- Clade: Embryophytes
- Clade: Tracheophytes
- Clade: Spermatophytes
- Clade: Angiosperms
- Clade: Eudicots
- Clade: Rosids
- Order: Rosales
- Family: Rosaceae
- Genus: Chaenomeles
- Species: C. japonica

Binomial name
- Chaenomeles japonica (Thunb.) Lindl. ex Spach

Synonyms
- List: Aronia japonica (Thunb.) K.Koch; Chaenomeles alpina (Maxim.) Koehne; Chaenomeles trichogyna Nakai; Cydonia japonica (Thunb.) Pers.; Cydonia maulei (Mast.) T.Moore; Cydonia sargentii Lemoine ex K.Schum.; Pseudochaenomeles maulei (Mast.) Carrière; Pyrus japonica Thunb.; Pyrus maulei Mast.

= Chaenomeles japonica =

Species of plant

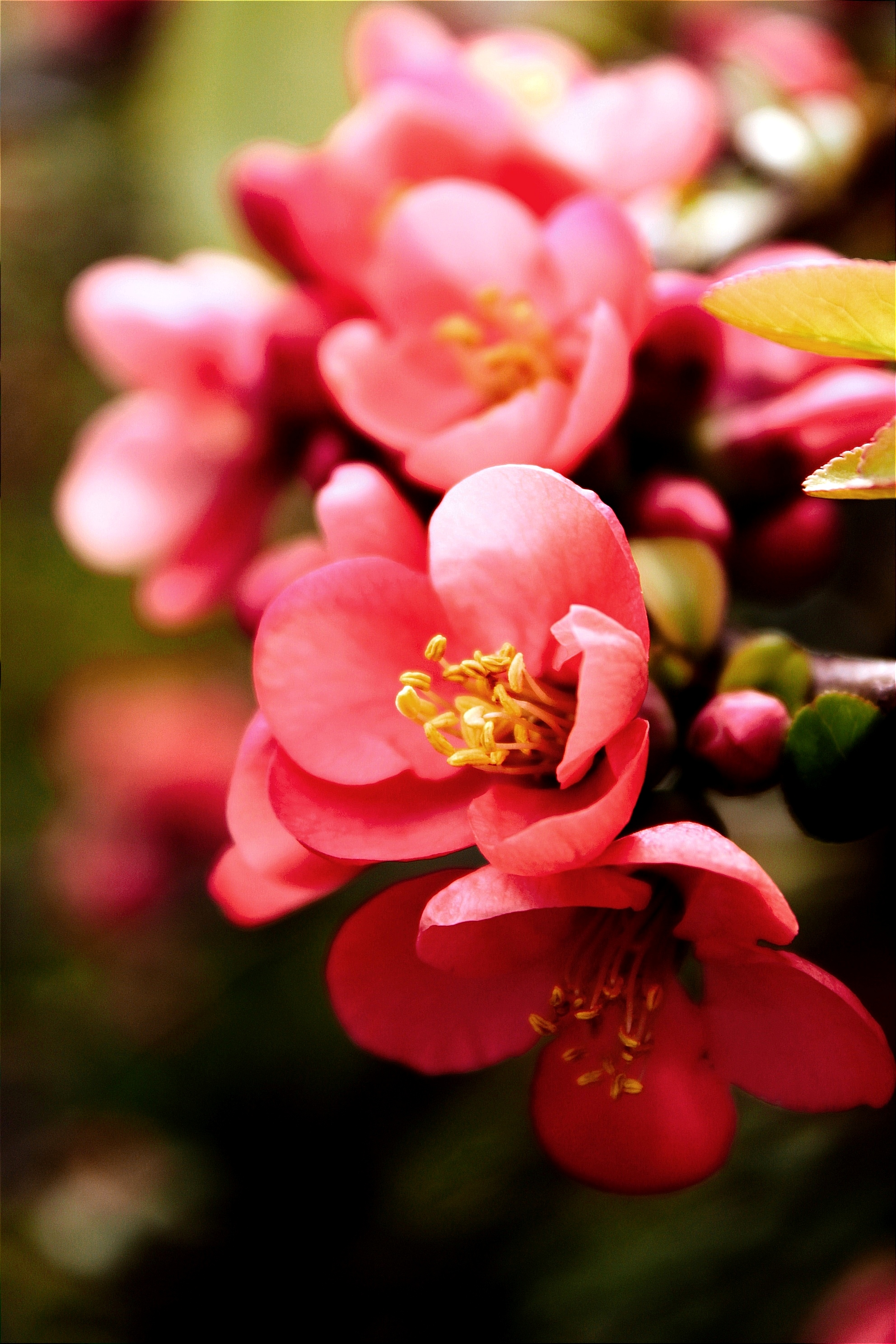
Chaenomeles japonica

Chaenomeles japonica, called the Japanese quince, Maule's quince, or "Japonica", is a species of flowering quince that is native to Japan.

It is a thorny deciduous shrub that is commonly cultivated. It is shorter than another commonly cultivated species C. speciosa, growing to only about 1 m in height. It is best known for its colorful spring flowers, which are red, white, pink or multicoloured.

== Description ==
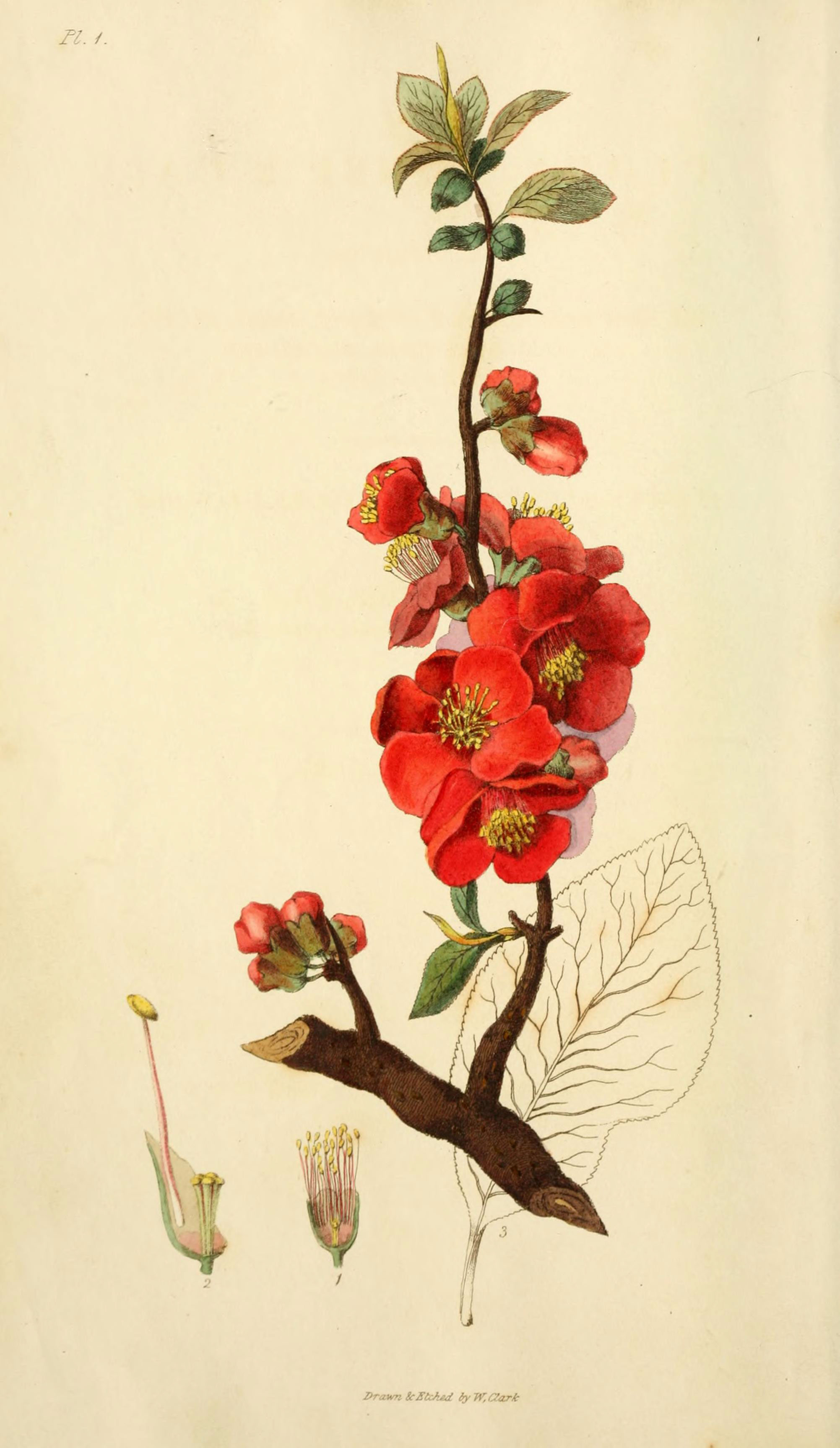
Illustration showing leaves, buds and flowers

It is a bulky shrub with thorns and widely spreading branches, which reaches heights of growth of 0.6 to 2.0 meters. The leaves are lanceolate to obovate, roughly toothed and glabrous even when young. They are 4 to 5 inches long and 2 to 3 inches wide, including the petiole. The unusually large stipules are 1 centimeter long and 1.5 to 2 centimeters wide, kidney-shaped and serrated on the edge; they are only found on long shoots.

It blooms in winter, before leaf budding; it blooms again in summer but with less abundance. Usually there are 2 to 3 flowers arranged together; they are coloured orange to brick red. When open, the flowers are 3 to 4 centimeters wide. The fruit is called Kusa-boke (草木瓜, Kusa-boke) in Japanese. It produces apple-shaped fruit, 4 to 7 centimeters in diameter, that are a golden-yellow color containing red-brown seeds.

== Uses ==
The fruit is edible, but hard and astringent, unless bletted or cooked. As with all fruits of the rose family, the pulp is non-toxic and the kernels contain small amounts of poison. The fruit is occasionally used in jam, jelly and pie making as a substitute for its cousin, the true quince, Cydonia oblonga. C. japonica is also popularly grown in bonsai. It accepts all types of soil, but grows very slowly in calcareous soil.

== Gallery ==
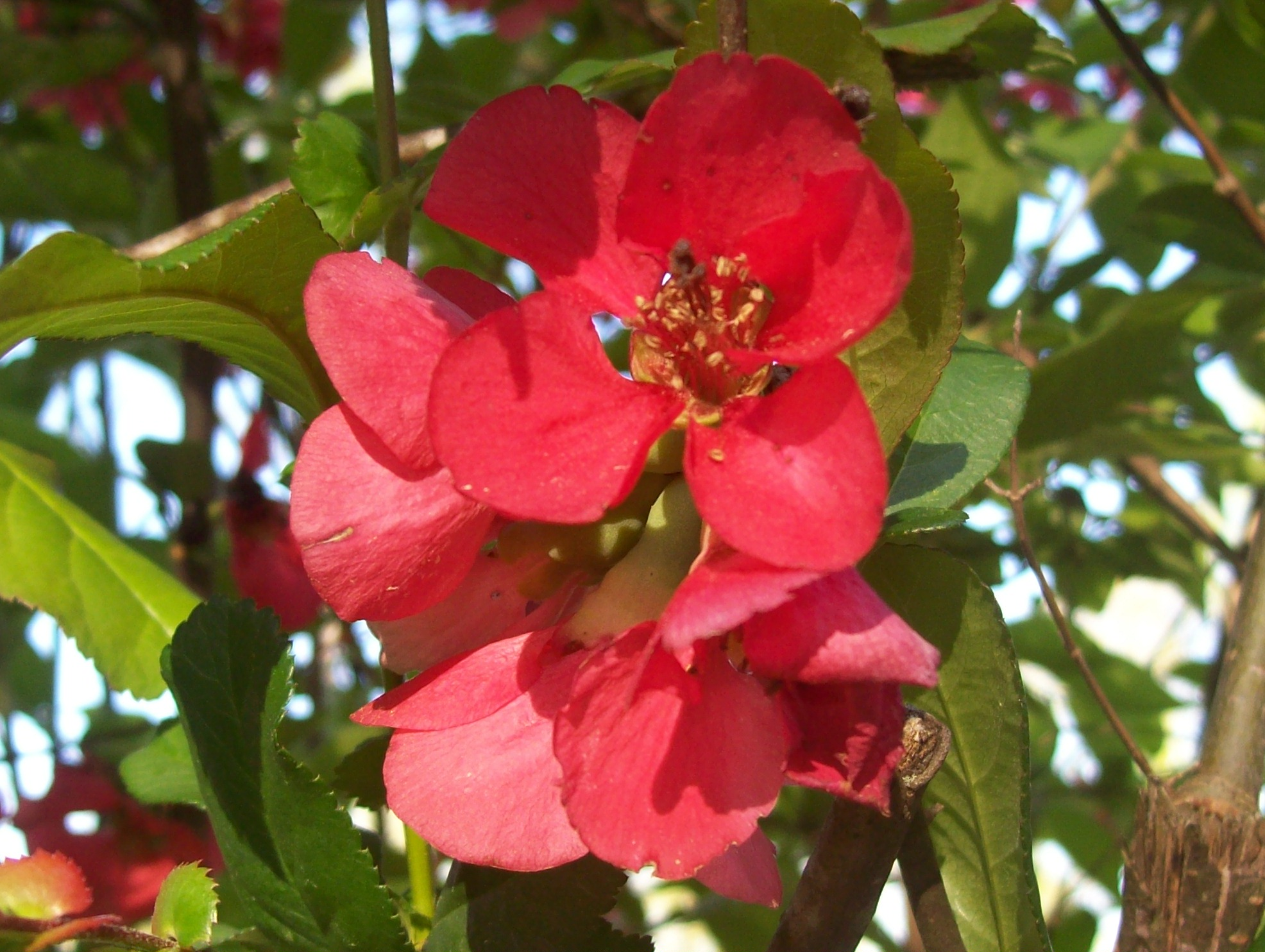
Flowers

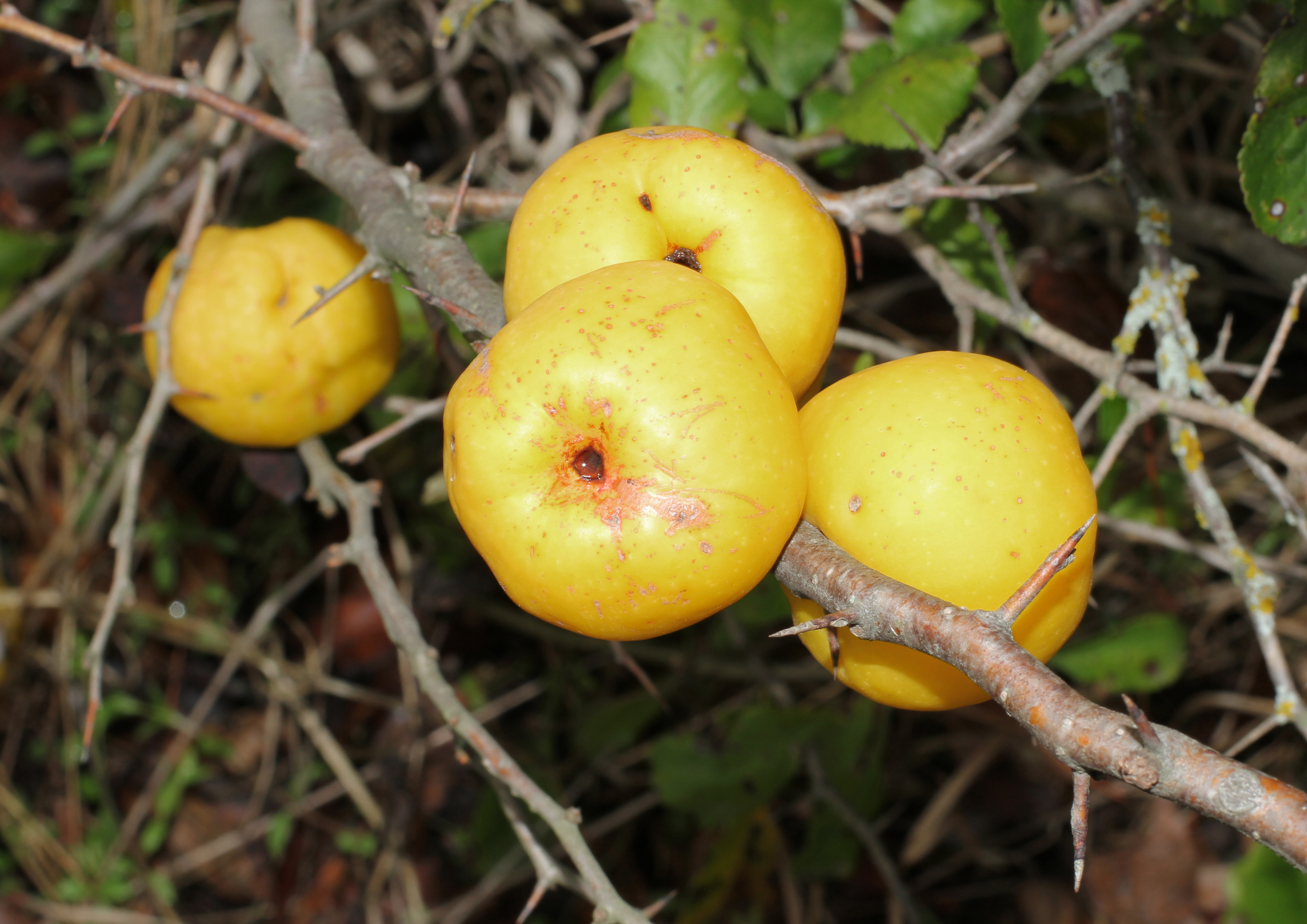
Fruit

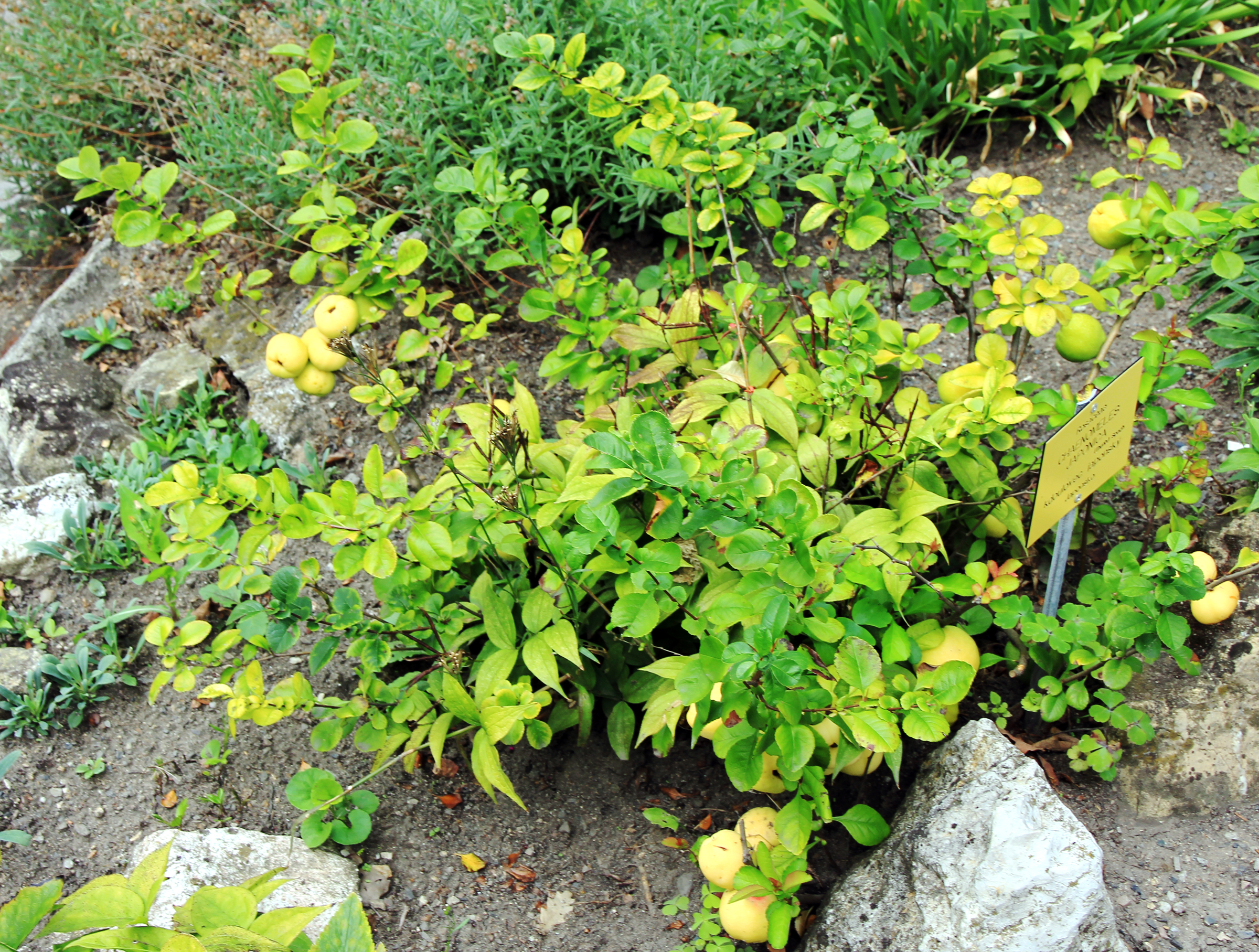
Whole plant
