= Meddler (disambiguation) =

A meddler is a busybody or marplot.

Meddler can also refer to:

- "Meddler" (short story), a science fiction short story by Philip K. Dick
- Meddler (horse), a thoroughbred racehorse from the early 1900s
- Meddler Island, included in the List of Torres Strait Islands
- "Meddler", a song by August Burns Red from the album Constellations

== See also ==
- Medlar (disambiguation)
- Medlar (Mespilus germanica), a large shrub and its edible fruit
