= Coleophora sacramenta =

Scientific classification
- Kingdom: Animalia
- Phylum: Arthropoda
- Class: Insecta
- Order: Lepidoptera
- Family: Coleophoridae
- Genus: Coleophora
- Species: C. sacramenta

Binomial name
- Coleophora sacramenta Heinrich, 1914

Species of moth

Coleophora sacramenta is a moth of the family Coleophoridae. It is found in the United States, including California.

The larvae feed on the leaves of Malus, Prunus (including Prunus americana), Populus, Tilia and Chaenomeles species. They create a pistol-shaped case.
