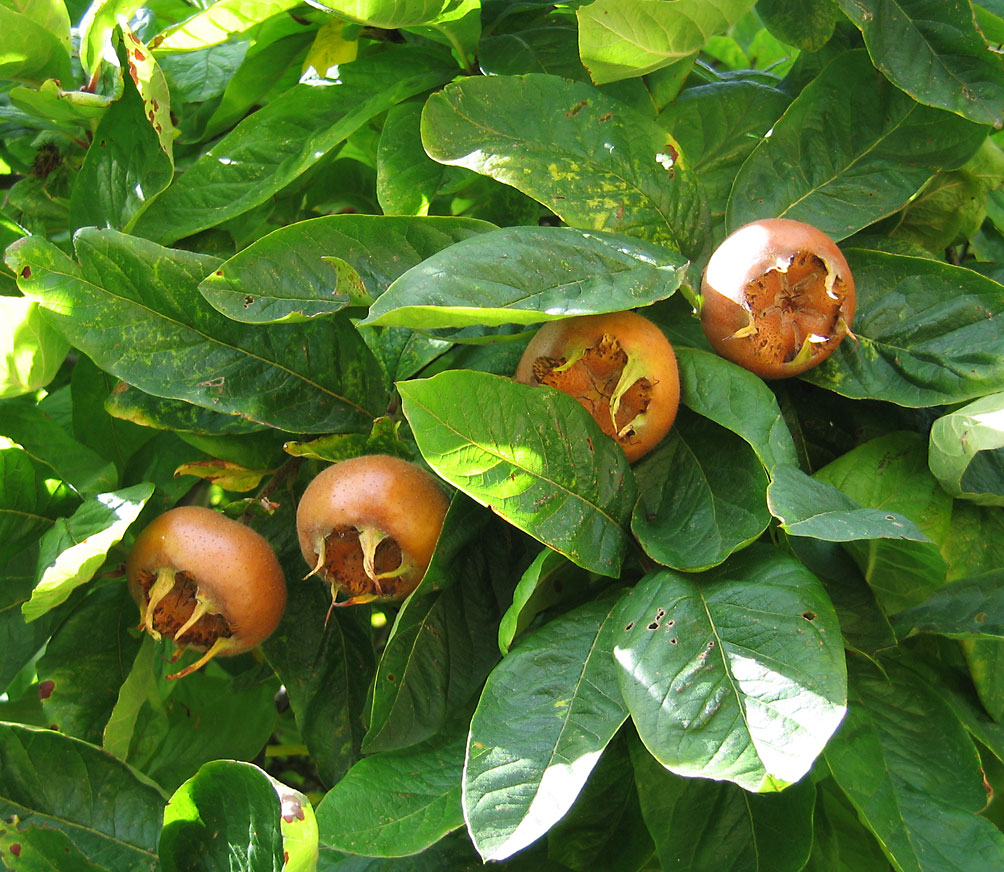
- Foliage and fruit

Conservation status
- Least Concern (IUCN 3.1)

Scientific classification
- Kingdom: Plantae
- Clade: Tracheophytes
- Clade: Angiosperms
- Clade: Eudicots
- Clade: Rosids
- Order: Rosales
- Family: Rosaceae
- Genus: Mespilus
- Species: M. germanica

Binomial name
- Mespilus germanica L.

= Mespilus germanica =

Fruit tree, the medlar

Mespilus germanica, known as the medlar or common medlar, is a large shrub or small tree in the rose family Rosaceae. When the genus Mespilus is included in the genus Crataegus, the correct name for this species is Crataegus germanica (L.) Kuntze.

The fruit of this tree, also called medlar, has been cultivated since Roman times. It is usually available in winter and eaten when bletted. It may be consumed raw and in a range of cooked dishes.

== Description ==
Under ideal circumstances, the deciduous plant grows up to 8 metres (26 feet) tall. Generally, it is shorter and more shrub-like than tree-like. With a lifespan of 30–60 years, the tree is rather short-lived. Its bark is greyish brown with deep vertical cracks forming rectangular plates that tend to lift off.

The wild form of M. germanica is mostly a thorny, more shrub-like than tree-like plant, which is between 1.5 and 4 m (5 and 13 ft) high. In the cultivated forms, the thorns are usually reduced or even completely absent. In general, the medlar is a small, deciduous tree with an overhanging, almost round crown. The trunk is irregularly shaped. The tree has a height between 1 and 6 m (3 1/2 and 19 1/2 ft), but can become significantly larger in culture. The diameter at breast height is usually between 20 and 25 cm (8 and 10 in), but in exceptional cases it can be up to 50 cm (20 in). The roots are heavily branched and far-ranging, with a somewhat fibrous root system.

The wood has a fine texture, but is very hard. It has a white, slightly pink-tinted sapwood. The core is brownish. The annual rings are clearly visible.

The winter buds are pointed, ovoid and up to 5 millimetres (1/4 inch) long. The leaves are dark green and elliptic, 8–15 centimetres (3–6 in) long and 3–5 cm (1–2 in) wide. The leaves are densely hairy (pubescent) below, and turn red in autumn before falling.

Medlar flowers are 2–5 cm (3/4–2 in) in diameter, have a short stalk and are terminal and single on short side shoots. They have five elongated, narrow sepals and five free, white or pale pink petals. Compared to other fruit trees in the European latitudes, the medlar flowers very late (May or June). The flowers are hermaphrodite and pollinated by bees. Normally, self-pollination occurs in this plant. The flower then develops flattened, reddish-brown, hairy fruits with juicy flesh. The reddish-brown fruit is a pome, 2–3 cm (3/4–1 1/4 in) diameter, with wide-spreading persistent sepals around a central pit, giving a 'hollow' appearance to the fruit. In cultivated forms the diameter is even between 3 and 8 cm (1 1/4 and 3 1/4 in).

Sexual reproduction is the norm in wild forms of the medlar. The resulting seeds have a germination capacity lasting from 18 to 20 months. The seeds are distributed by various animals such as birds, squirrels and deer. Some varieties are sterile and can therefore only be propagated vegetatively.

The number of chromosomes is given as 2n = 32 or 2n = 34.

== Taxonomy ==
The flower has long sepals that remain on the fruit.

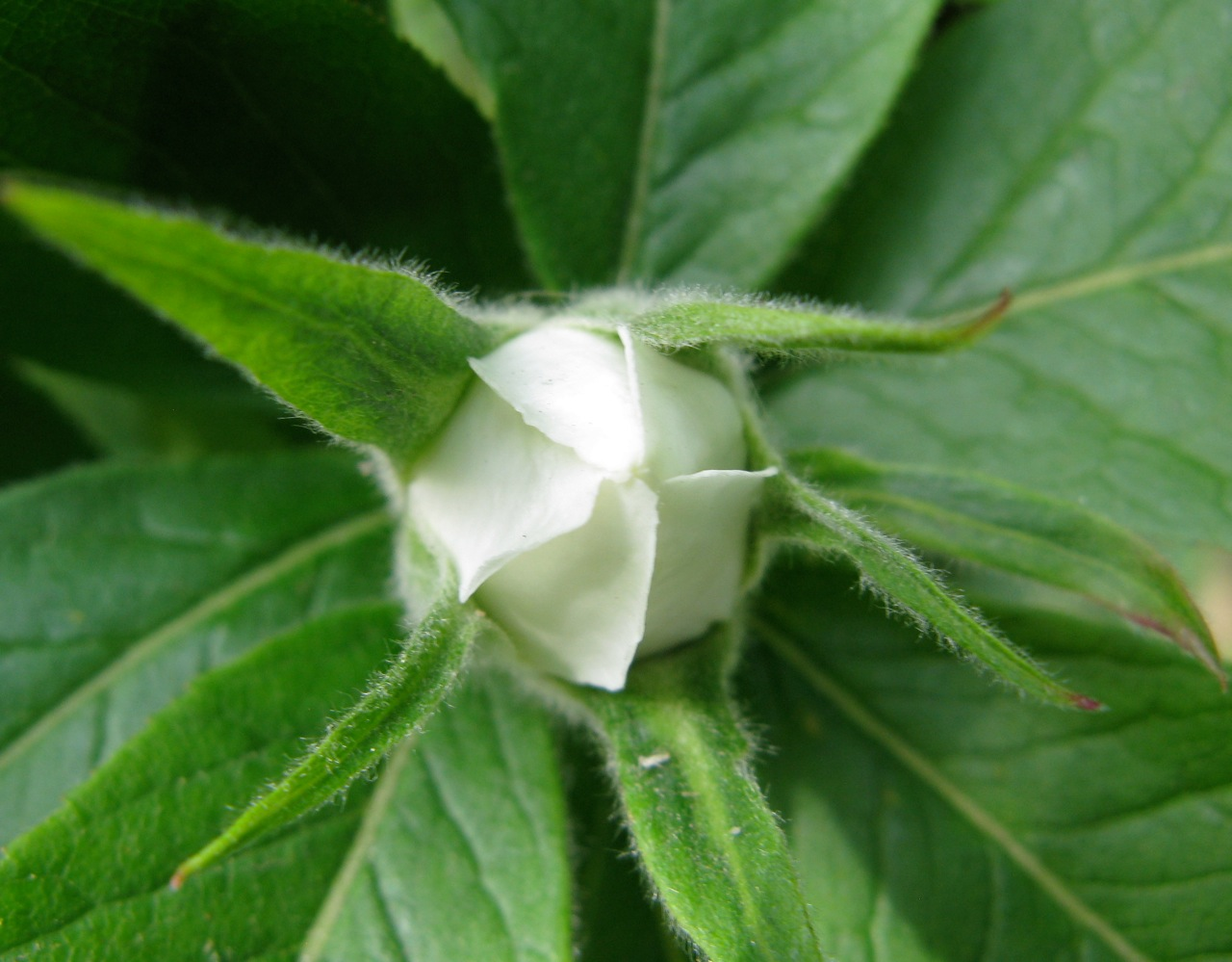
Flower bud

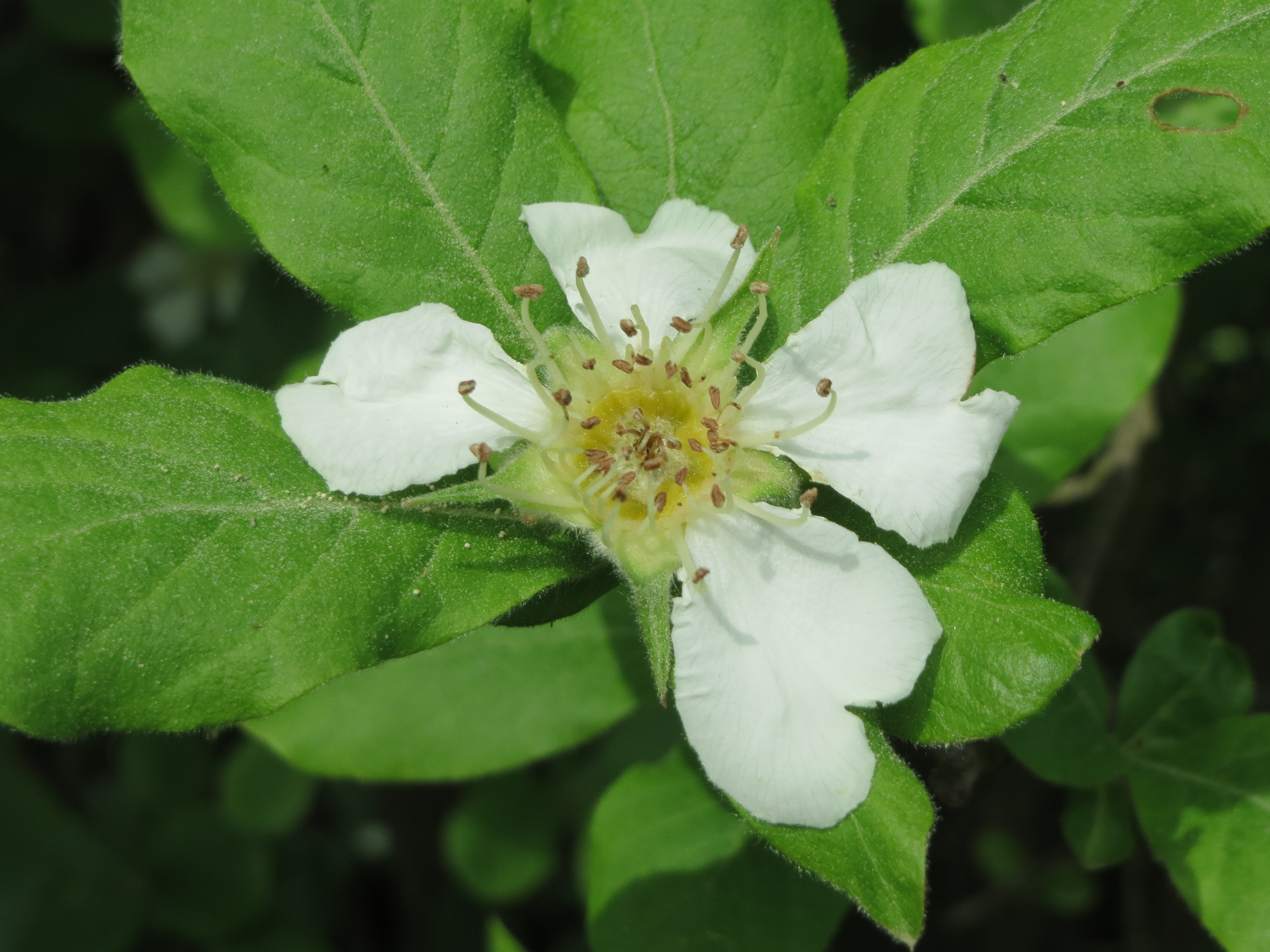
Open flower

Until recently, M. germanica was the only known species of medlar. However, in 1990, a new species was discovered in North America, now named M. canescens. The loquat, Eriobotrya japonica, is more distantly related to the medlar than genera such as Crataegus, Amelanchier, Peraphyllum, and Malacomeles, but was once thought to be closely related, and is still sometimes called the 'Chinese medlar' or 'Japanese medlar'.

=== Systematics ===
Within the species M. germanica 23 taxa are distinguished, also comprising wild or semi-wild forms, ornamental and of different origin. Among them there are the following varieties:

- Mespilus germanica var. gigantea Kirchn. with very large fruits
- Mespilus germanica var. abortiva Kirchn. with fruits without seeds
- Mespilus germanica var. argenteo-variegata with white variegated leaves as ornamental plant
- Mespilus germanica var. aureo-variegata with yellow variegated leaves as ornamental plant

Cultivars of M. germanica that are grown for their fruit include 'Hollandia', 'Nottingham', and 'Russian', the large-fruited variety 'Dutch' (also known as 'Giant' or 'Monstrous'), 'Breda giant', 'Large Russian', 'Royal' with very high yield, 'Early medlar' with early ripening and high quality fruits, 'Seedless' with seedless fruits of low quality.

The cultivar 'Nottingham' has gained the Royal Horticultural Society's Award of Garden Merit.

For a time it was assumed that it was a species with narrow genetic resources and therefore subject to high risks of genetic erosion, whereby the limited evolution of M. germanica diversity was ascribed to the lack of economic interest for this fruit species in the last centuries. However, current findings show that natural populations of medlar are diverse with a high genetic potential, which could be used to improve production by using specific genotypes.

=== Etymology ===
The Latin name germanica means 'German', although the species is indigenous to other areas.

== Distribution and habitat ==
From an extensive study of literature and plant specimens, Kazimierz Browicz concluded that the true homeland of M. germanica is only in the southeastern part of the Balkan peninsula, in Asia Minor, on the Caucasus, Crimea, northern Iran, and possibly also in Turkmenistan. It is also found in southeastern Europe, especially the Black Sea coasts of Bulgaria and Turkey. Fossil remains, however, have been reported from a wider area, including from Oriolo, Italy (c. 800 kya thousand years ago) and Burgtonna, Germany (130-115 thousand years ago), dating from the Pleistocene.

The species requires temperate and sub-mediterranean climate conditions with warm summers and mild winters. Air temperatures of 18 to 20 °C (64 to 68 °F) are mentioned as favourable for growth, cold of as low as −20 °C (−4 °F) is tolerated and late frosts hardly cause any damage. The wild form was observed in dry areas with annual precipitation of 700 mm (28 in) and at altitudes from 0 to 1,100 m (0 to 3,600 ft). The species grows in a wide range of soil types and prefers fresh, well-drained loamy soils with a pH that is between 6 and 8. It is found across southern Europe where it is generally rare. It is reported to be naturalised in some woods in southeast England, but is found in few gardens.

== Ecology ==
=== Plant disease ===
M. germanica is only rarely attacked by diseases or harmed by insects.

In plantations, the larvae of the leaf-mining butterfly species Lithocolletis blancardella can cause damage. Furthermore, especially in years with high precipitation, the fungus Monilinia fructigena can be a problem. It causes brown blemishes on the fruit and continues to spread until the fruit becomes entirely rotten.

M. germanica can also be infected by Podosphaera clandestina, the pathogen of powdery mildew, which can lead to the wilting of leaves and buds as well as by Entomosporium mespili that causes leaf spots.

The medlar is, like other species of the rosacea family which are used for propagation, susceptible to Erwinia amylovora, the parasitic causative agent of fire blight.

== Cultivation ==
The species may have been cultivated for as long as 3,000 years. The ancient Greek geographer Strabo refers to a μέσπιλον (méspilon) in Geographica, Book 16, Chapter 4. The medlar was introduced to Greece around 700 BC and to Rome about 200 BC. It was an important fruit plant during Roman and medieval times. By the 17th and 18th centuries, however, it had been superseded by other fruits, and is cultivated much less today.

M. germanica pomes are one of the few fruits that become edible in winter, making it an important tree for gardeners who wish to have fruit available all year round.

Cultivated forms are propagated by inoculation and by grafting on various substrates such as Crataegus (hawthorn) species, mountain ash, pear or quince to improve the performance in different soils. Cultivars reach full fruit set 6 to 7 years after grafting and they keep it for 20 to 25 years. The fruit production varies between 30 and 70 kilograms (70 and 150 pounds) per tree and year, depending on the variety and age.

Grafting on medlar seedlings is not recommended because of the slow growth of the grafts. Irrigation and fertilisation can stimulate growth in plantations. If the fruit-bearing shoots are cut back after the harvest, the formation of new fertile short shoots is encouraged.

== Uses ==
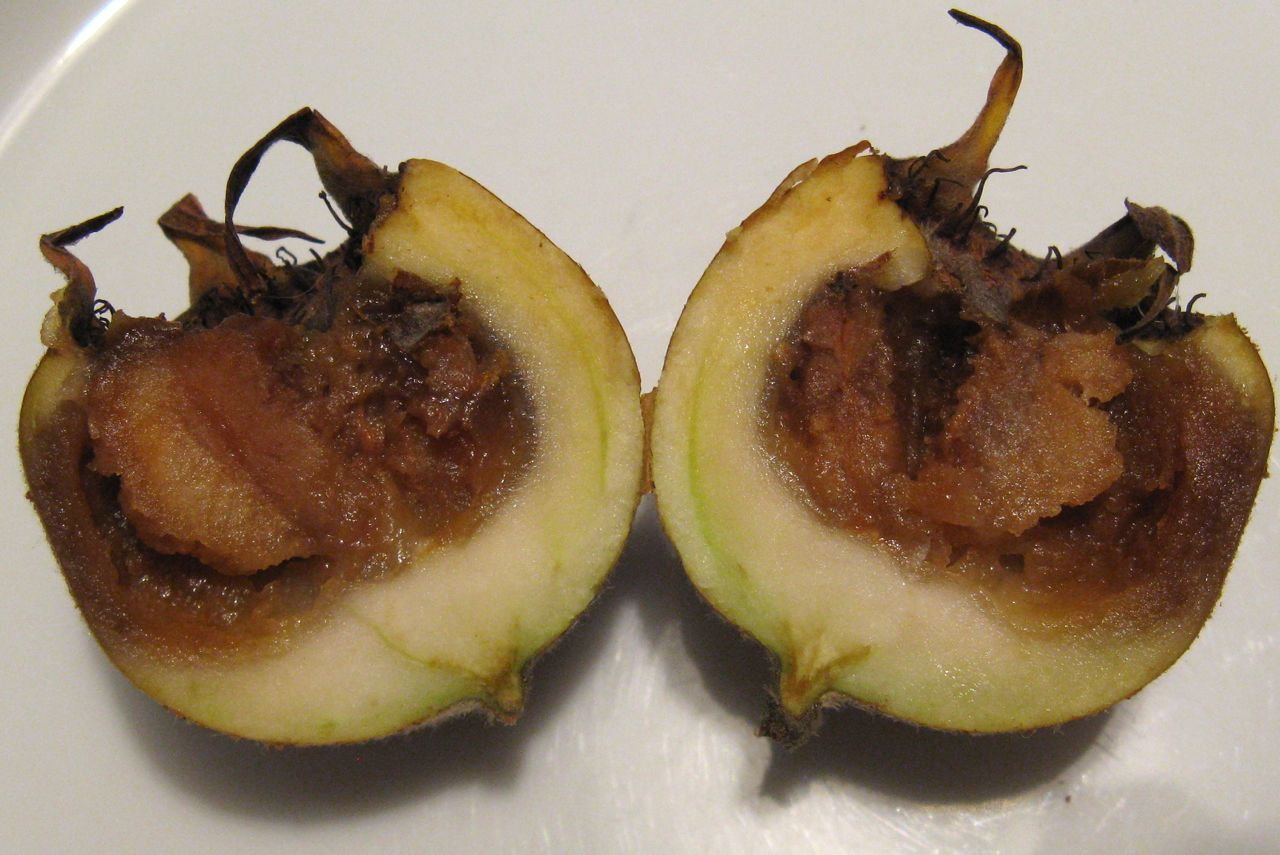
Bletting begins on one side of the fruit. Bletted flesh is brown; ripe but unbletted flesh is white.

The fruits are hard and acidic even when ripe, but become edible after being softened, "bletted", by frost, or naturally in storage if given sufficient time by reducing tannin content and fruit acids, increasing sugar content, and changes in the content of minerals.

Once softening begins, the skin rapidly takes on a wrinkled texture and turns dark brown, and the inside reduces to the consistency and flavour reminiscent of apple sauce. This process can confuse those new to medlars, as its softened fruit looks as if it has spoiled.

In Gilan, northern Iran, the leaves, bark, fruits and wood of the medlar tree are traditionally used in herbal medicine.

=== Product use ===
Once bletted, the fruit can be eaten raw, sometimes with sugar and cream—it has been described as being an "acquired taste"—or used to make medlar jelly. It is used in "medlar cheese", which is similar to lemon curd, made with the fruit pulp, eggs, and butter.

Unripe fruits have a relatively high tannin content of about 2.6% and are therefore used for tanning. The tannin causes flocculation of proteins, enabling its use to reduce the turbidity of wine. In Saarland, Germany, a schnapps is made from the fruit of the medlar, which is refined with hawthorn. "Medlar tea" usually is not made from M. germanica, but from wolfberry, or goji, which is sometimes inaccurately translated as "red medlar."

Mespilus germanica kernel oil was used for the first time to produce biodiesel, whereby linoleic acid and oleic acid with about 40% are main constituents of the extracted oil. The physical properties of the produced biodiesel allows an alternative for diesel fuels without any modification to the conventional engines. Leaves of medlar fruit were used to produce activated carbon to remove heavy metals like Ni^{2+} from aqueous solutions.

Silver nanoparticles could be synthesised using M. germanica extract and show antibacterial, antibiofilm activities against multidrug resistance of Klebsiella pneumoniae clinical strains.

=== Nutrients and phytochemicals ===
In general, the medlar fruits were found to be rich in potassium, calcium, phosphorus, magnesium and iron.

M. germanica contains various phytochemicals varying between genotypes, fruit ripeness, harvest time and storage conditions. The fruits are particularly rich in monoterpenes and organic acids. Amino acids, sugars, and organic acids affect flavour.

Due to their diuretic and astringent effects, the fruits have been used in traditional medicine.

In 1984 and 1985, the following values were given for homogenised fruit:

Time Frame	L-ascorbic acid	Glucose	Fructose	Potassium	Calcium
Early 1984	1.64 mg/l	53.75 mg/l	37.31 mg/l	47.20 ppm	4.70 ppm
End 1984	1.54 mg/l	61.74 mg/l	70.06 mg/l	43.00 ppm	4.50 ppm
Early 1985	2.64 mg/l	43.50 mg/l	35.70 mg/l	48.90 ppm	5.20 ppm
Late 1985	1.41 mg/l	60.30 mg/l	60.50 mg/l	46.1 ppm	5.00 ppm

Fructose content increases steadily during fruit development, whereas sucrose content increases for 4 months and decreases afterwards. Tannin content and fruit acid content, especially ascorbid acid, decreases during fruit development. In ripe fruit, glutamate and aspartate were the major amino compounds, but also total amino acid composition changed during fruit development.

== In culture ==
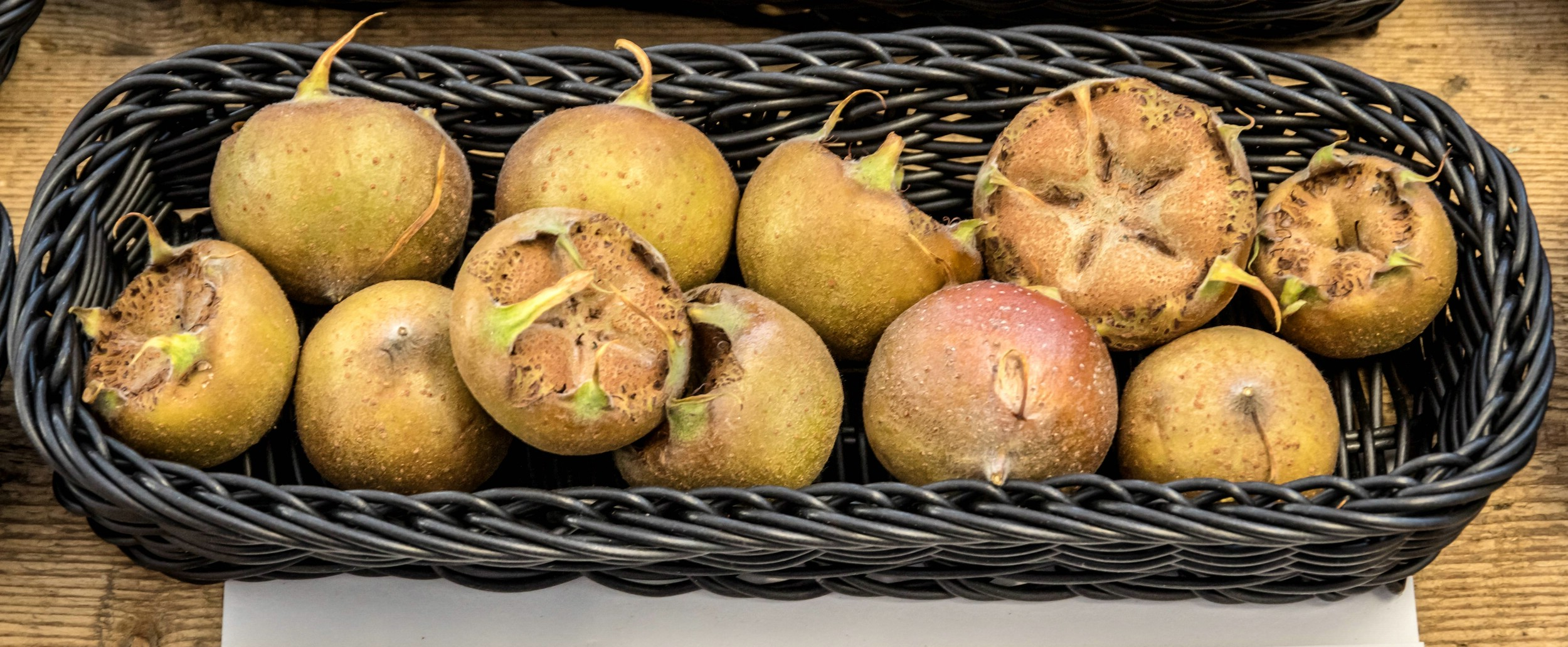
A basket of medlars

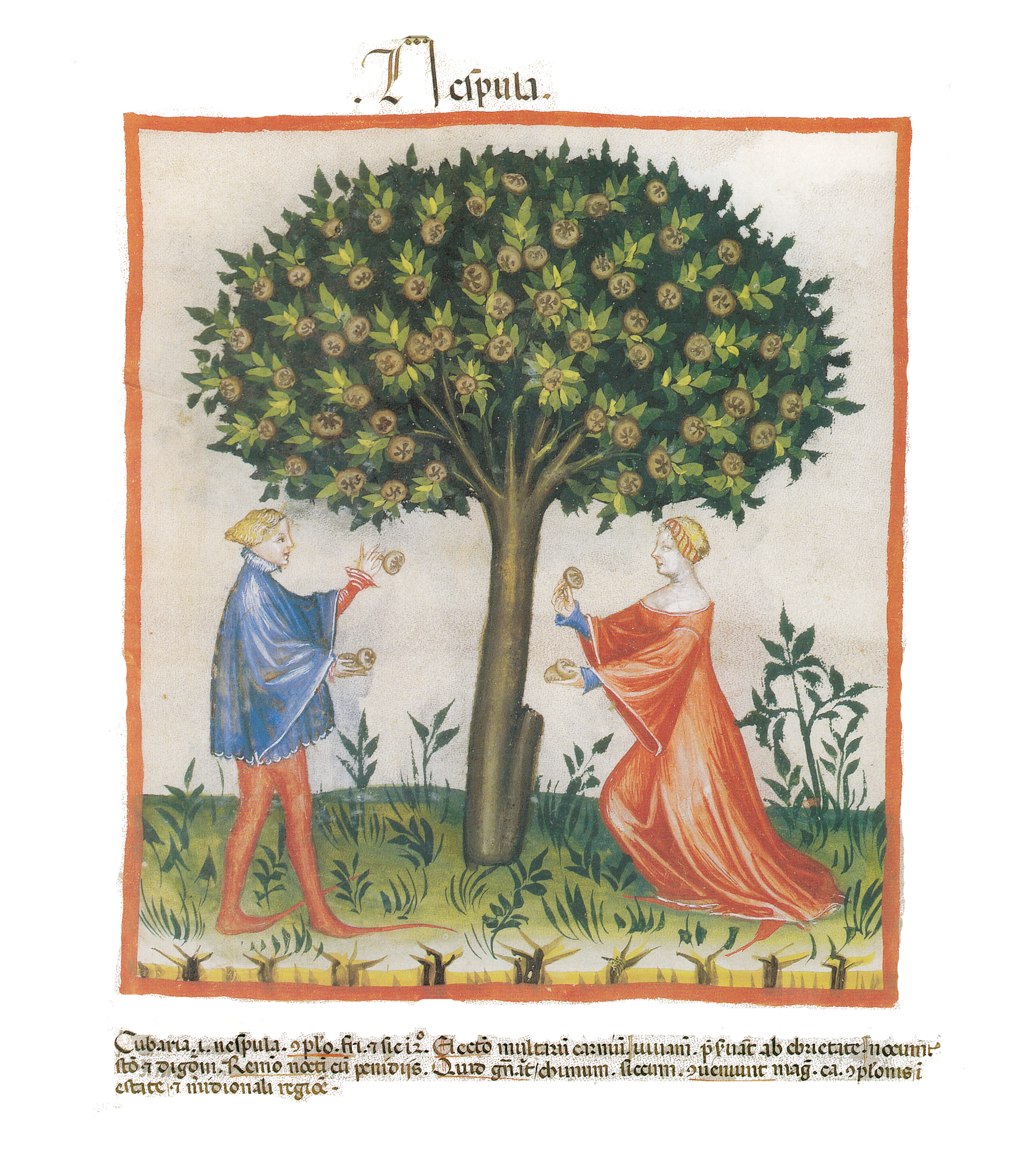
Medlars depicted in Tacuinum Sanitatis, 14th century

=== Chaucer ===
A fruit which is rotten before it is ripe, the medlar is used figuratively in literature as a symbol of prostitution or premature destitution. For example, in the Prologue to The Reeve's Tale, Geoffrey Chaucer's character laments his old age, comparing himself to the medlar, which he names using the Middle English term for the fruit, "open-arse":

This white top writeth myne olde yeris;
Myn herte is mowled also as myne heris —
But if I fare as dooth an open-ers.
That ilke fruyt is ever lenger the wers,
Til it be roten in mullok or in stree.
We olde men, I drede, so fare we:
Til we be roten, kan we nat be rype;

=== Shakespeare ===
In William Shakespeare's Timon of Athens, Apemantus forces an apple upon Timon: "The middle of humanity thou never knewest, but the extremity of both ends. When thou wast in thy gilt and perfume, they mock'd thee for too much curiosity; in thy rags thou know'st none, but art despised for the contrary. There's a medlar for thee; eat it", perhaps including a pun on "meddler", one who meddles in affairs, as well as on rottenness. (IV.iii.300–305).

In Measure for Measure, Lucio excuses his denial of past fornication because "they would else have married me to the rotten medlar." (IV.iii.171).

In As You Like It, Rosalind makes a complicated pun involving grafting her interlocutor with the trees around her which bear love letters and with a medlar: "I'll graff it with you, and then I shall graff it with a medlar. Then it will be the earliest fruit i' th' country; for you'll be rotten ere you be half ripe, and that's the right virtue of the medlar." (III.ii.116–119).

The most famous reference to medlars, often bowdlerized until modern editions accepted it, appears in Shakespeare's Romeo and Juliet, when Mercutio laughs at Romeo's unrequited love for his mistress Rosaline (II, 1, 34–38):

Now will he sit under a medlar tree,
And wish his mistress were that kind of fruit
As maids call medlars, when they laugh alone.
O Romeo, that she were, O that she were
An open-arse and thou a pop'rin pear!

In the 16th and 17th centuries, medlars were bawdily called "open-arses" because of the shape of the fruits — a name that first appears in Old English as openærs — inspiring boisterous or humorously indecent puns in many Elizabethan and Jacobean plays. The name survived in common use well into the 20th century. In the southwest of England it was historically called monkey's bottom, due to the appearance of its large calyx (sepals).

=== Other sixteenth- and seventeenth-century authors ===
In Miguel de Cervantes' Don Quixote the eponymous hero and Sancho Panza "stretch themselves out in the middle of a field and stuff themselves with acorns or medlars."

In François Rabelais' Gargantua and Pantagruel, medlars play a role in the origin of giants, including the eponymous characters. After Cain killed Abel, the blood of the just saturated the Earth, causing enormous medlars to grow. Humans who ate these medlars grew to great proportions. Those whose bodies grew longer became giants, and were the ancestors of Gargantua and Pantagruel.

Thomas Dekker also draws a comparison in his play The Honest Whore: "I scarce know her, for the beauty of her cheek hath, like the moon, suffered strange eclipses since I beheld it: women are like medlars, no sooner ripe but rotten."

Another reference can be found in Thomas Middleton's A Trick to Catch the Old One in the character of Widow Medler, impersonated by a courtesan, hence the following pun: "Who? Widow Medler? She lies open to much rumour."

In the Memoirs of Glückel of Hameln, Glückel recalls having had a craving for medlars when she was pregnant with her son Joseph, but ignoring the desire. When the baby was born, he was sickly and too weak to be breastfed. Remembering a superstition about the dangers of pregnant women not fulfilling their cravings, Glückel asked for someone to fetch her some medlars for the baby. As soon as the fruit touched the baby's lips, he ate all the pulp given to him, and was then able to be breastfed.

=== Modern literature ===
In modern literature, some writers have mentioned this fruit.

Saki uses medlars in his short stories, which often play on the decay of Edwardian society. In "The Peace of Mowsle Barton", the outwardly quiet farmstead features a medlar tree and corrosive hatred. In "The Boar Pig", the titular animal, Tarquin Super US (named after Lucius Tarquinius Superbus, the last king of Rome), is the point of contact between society ladies cheating to get into the garden party of the season and a not entirely honest young schoolgirl who lures him away by strategically throwing well-bletted medlars: "Come, Tarquin, dear old boy; you know you can't resist medlars when they're rotten and squashy."

Italian novelist Giovanni Verga's naturalist narrative I Malavoglia is titled The House by the Medlar Tree in the English translation.

H. C. Bailey's detective Reggie Fortune is very fond of medlars.

Philip Pullman describes Sir Charles Latrom's perfume as "rotted like a medlar" in his book The Subtle Knife.

== See also ==
- Chaenomeles speciosa
- Crabapple
- Pseudocydonia
- Sorbus

== Gallery ==
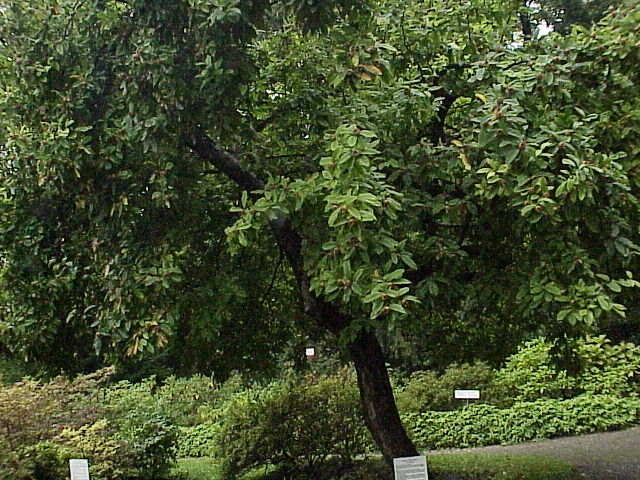
Medlar tree

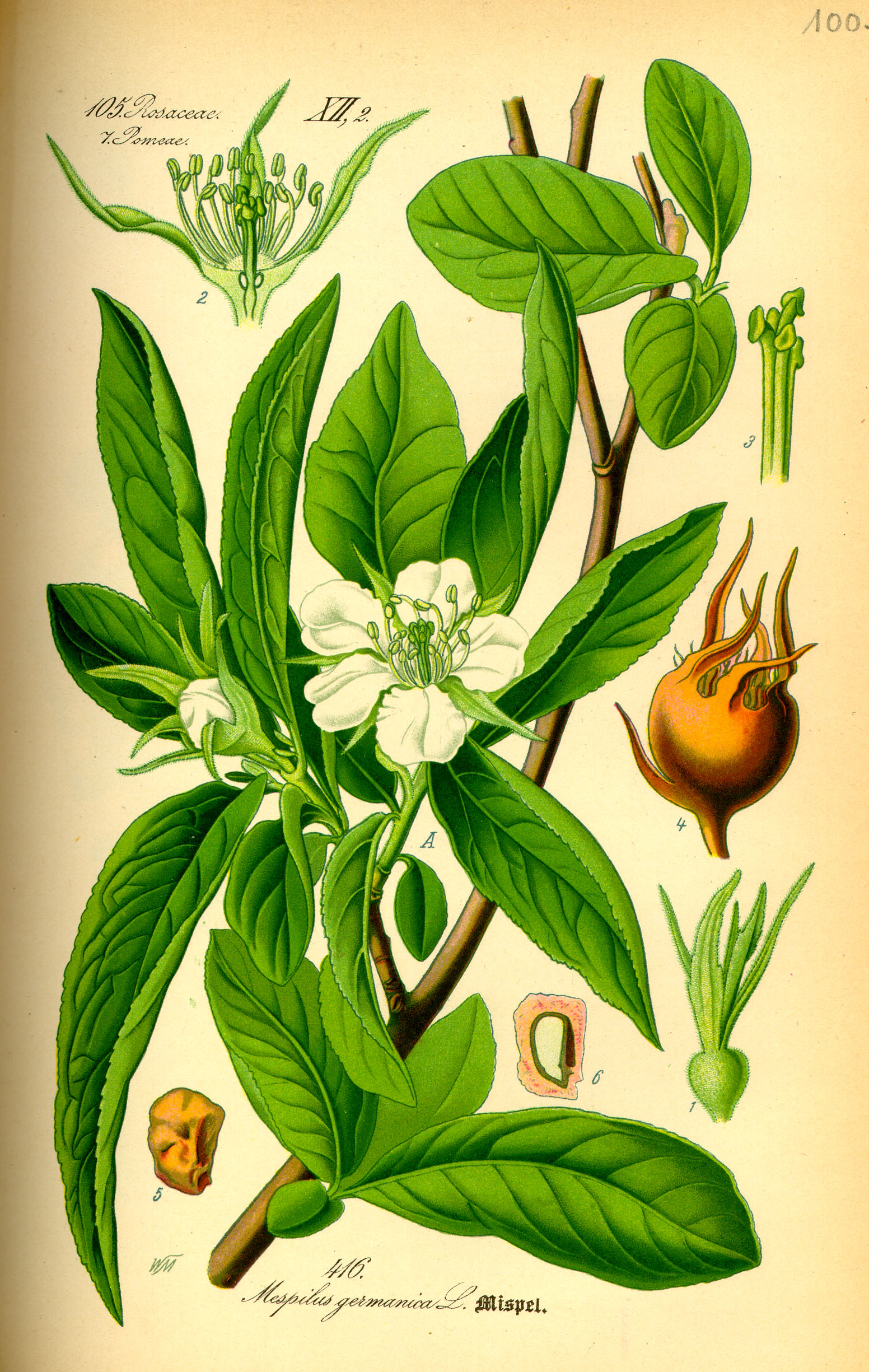
Illustration of medlar

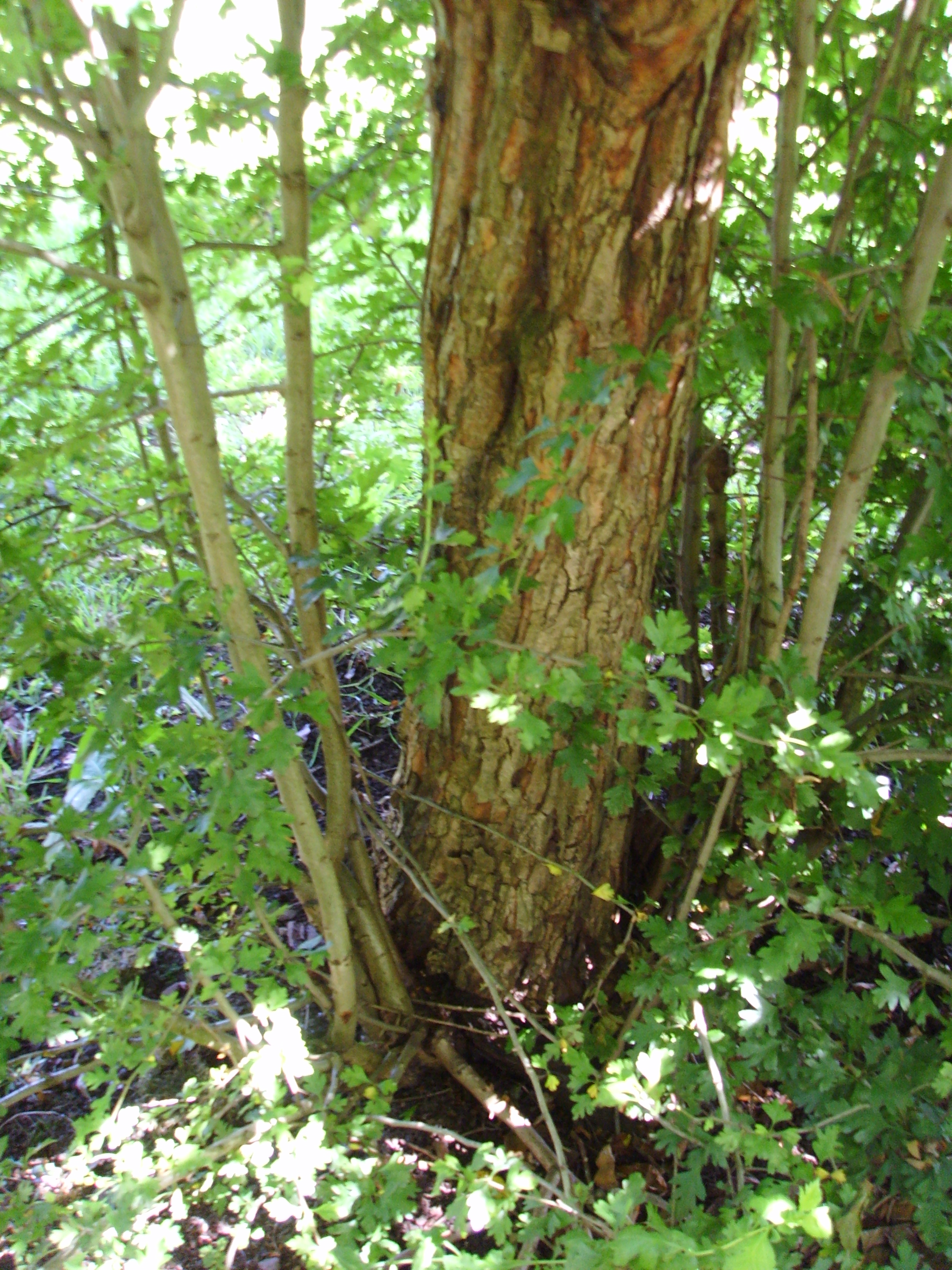
Medlar growing on Hawthorn rootstock

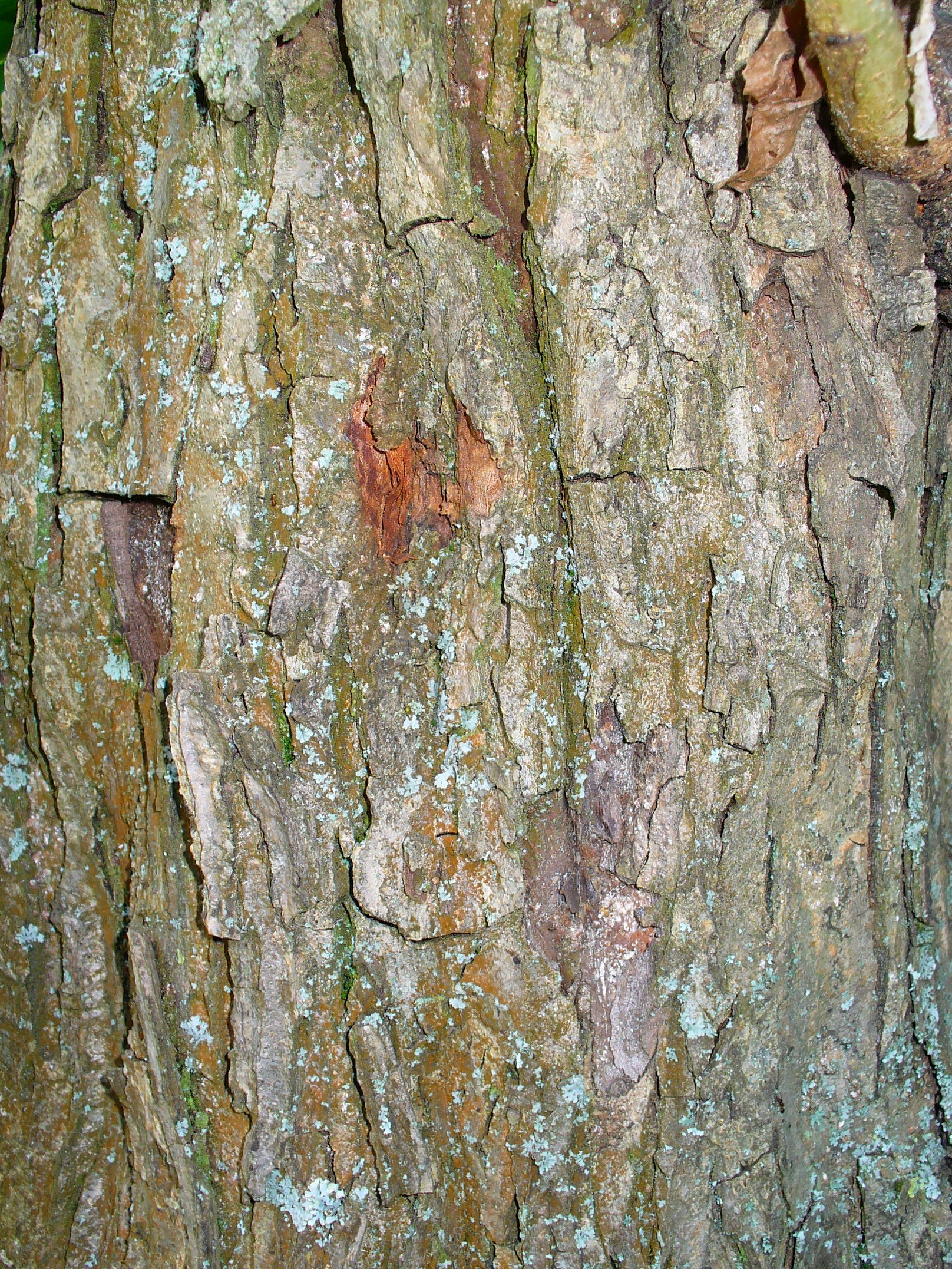
Bark of medlar tree

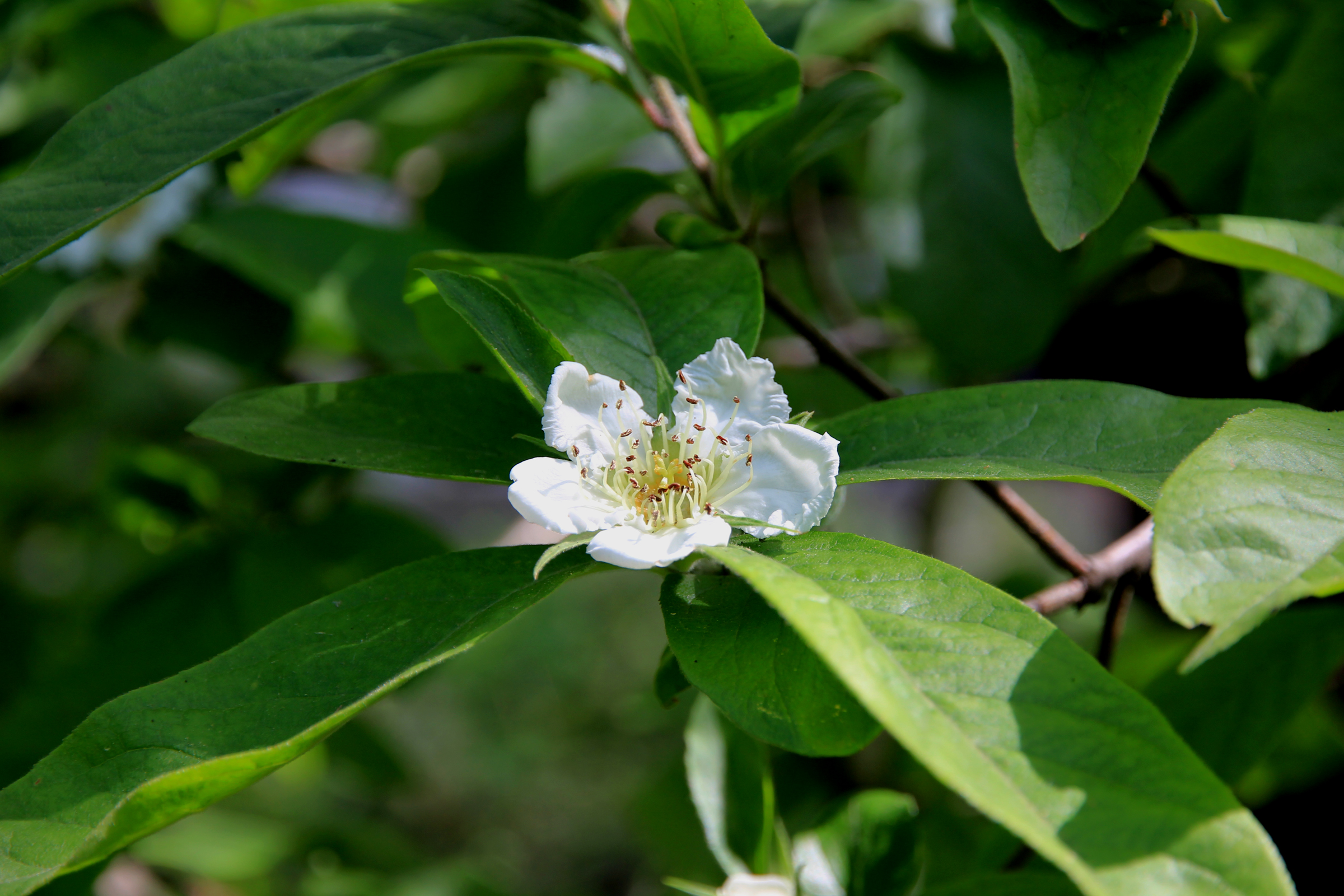
Flower of medlar

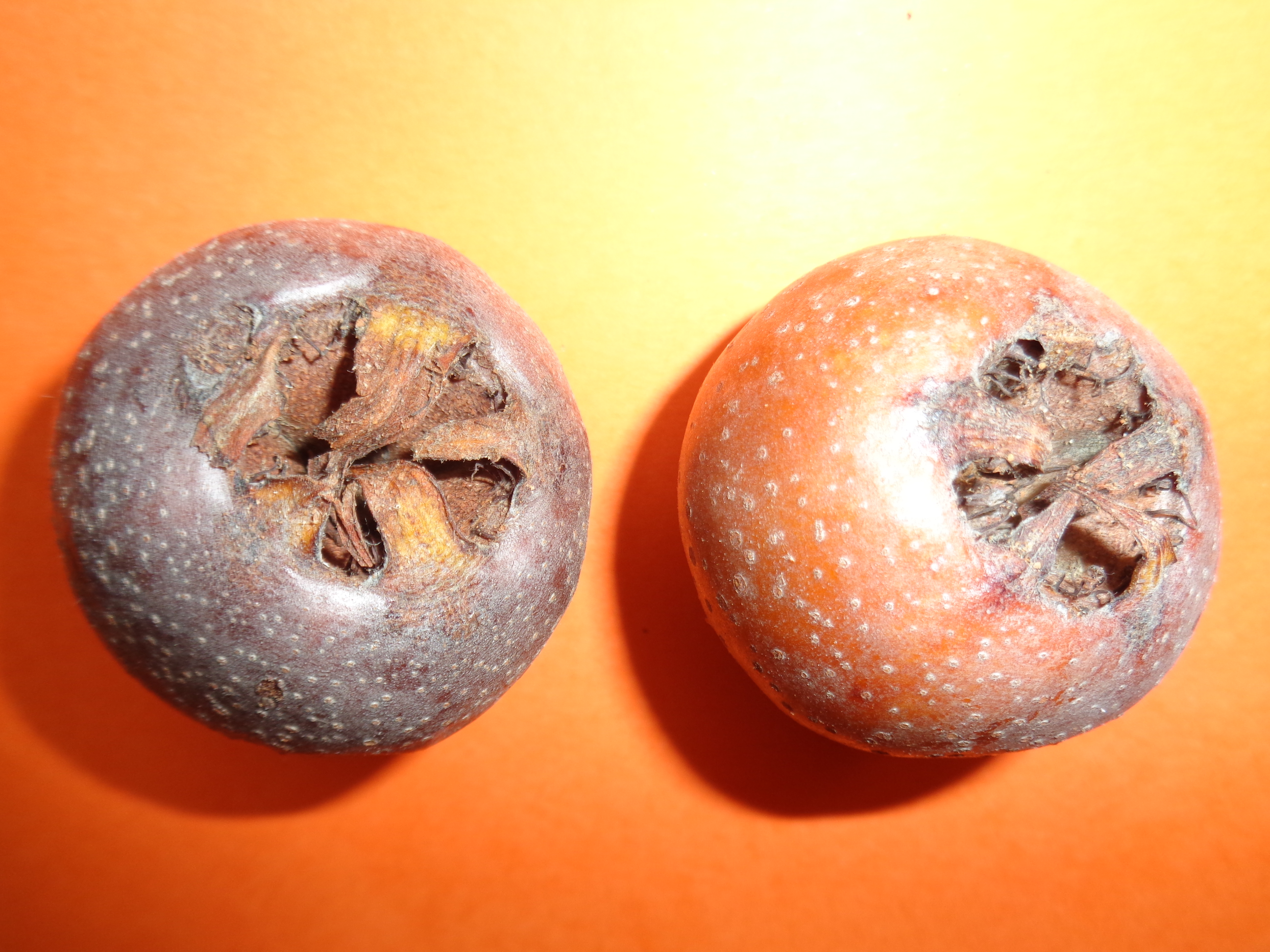
Bletted (left) and unbletted (right) medlar fruit

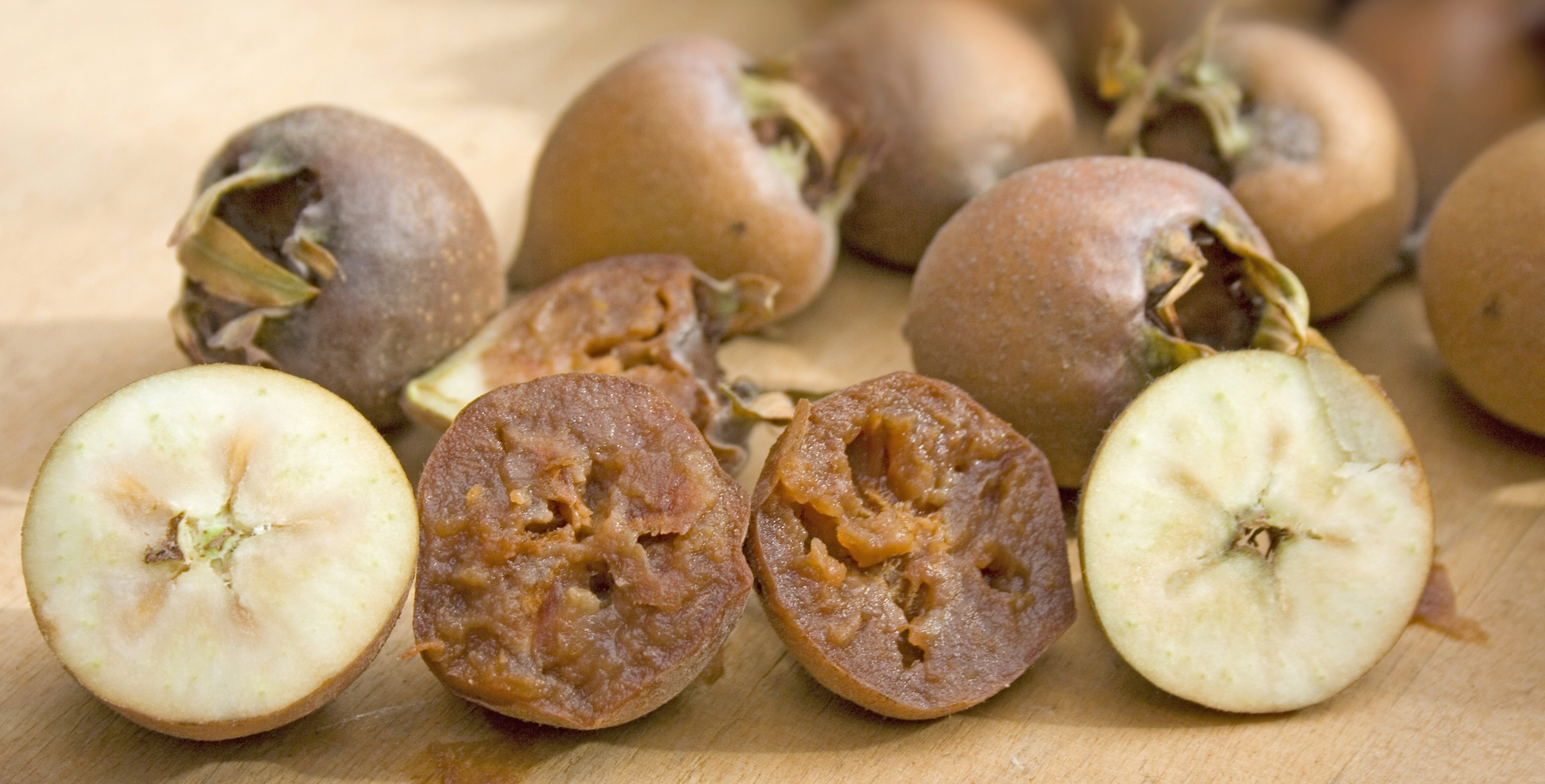
Ripe (bletted) and unripe medlar fruit

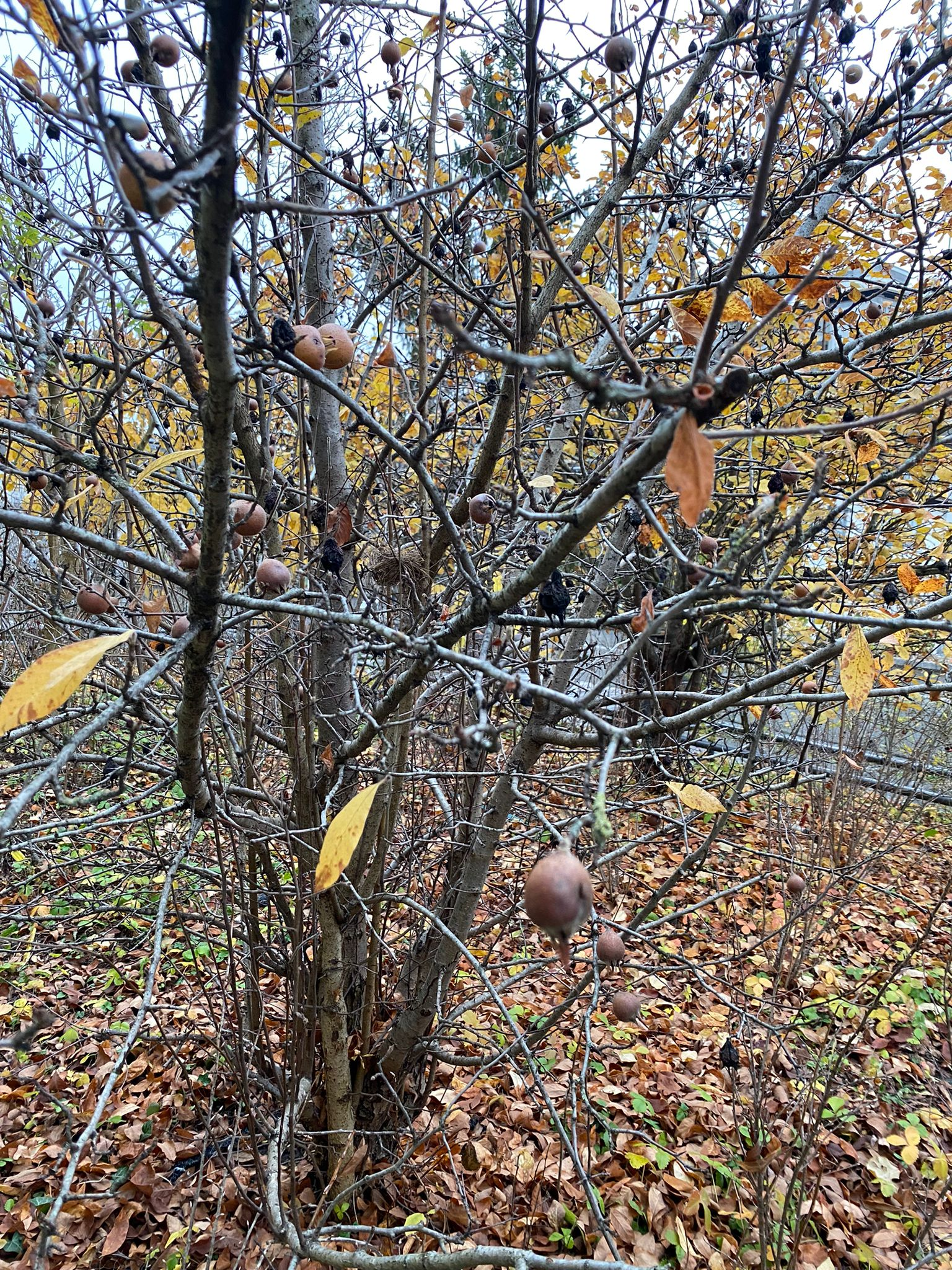
Medlar tree in late autumn with ripe fruits (Switzerland, ETH Zurich)
