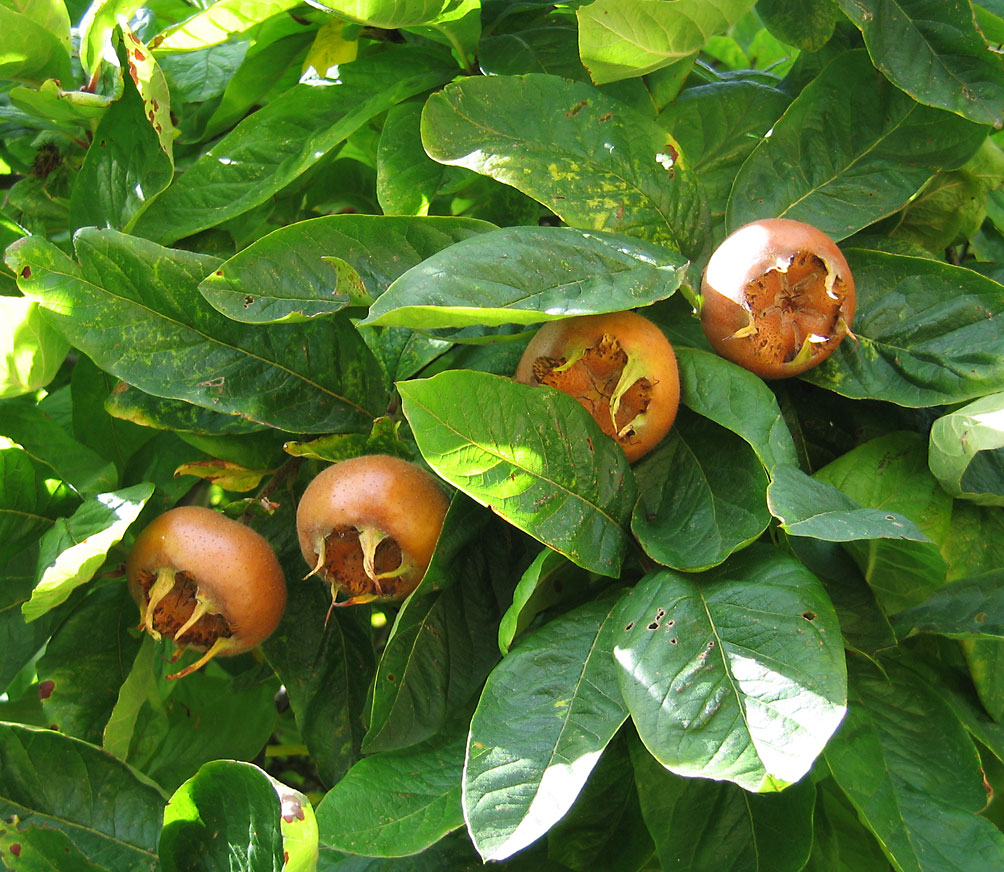
- Common medlar foliage and fruit

Scientific classification
- Kingdom: Plantae
- Clade: Embryophytes
- Clade: Tracheophytes
- Clade: Angiosperms
- Clade: Eudicots
- Clade: Rosids
- Order: Rosales
- Family: Rosaceae
- Subfamily: Amygdaloideae
- Tribe: Maleae
- Subtribe: Malinae
- Genus: Mespilus; Bosc ex Spach

Species
- Mespilus germanica

= Mespilus =

Genus of flowering plants

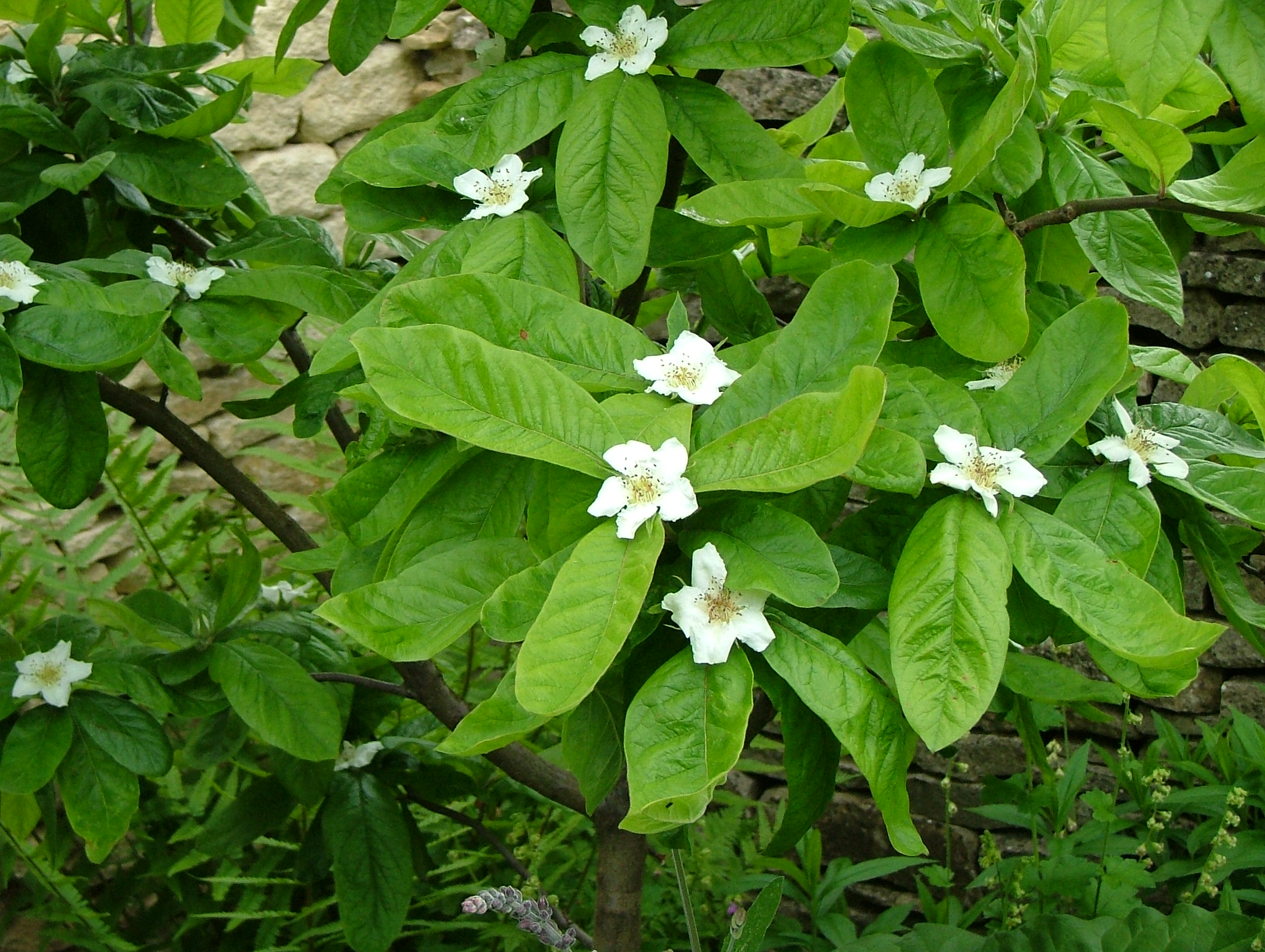
Common medlar flowers

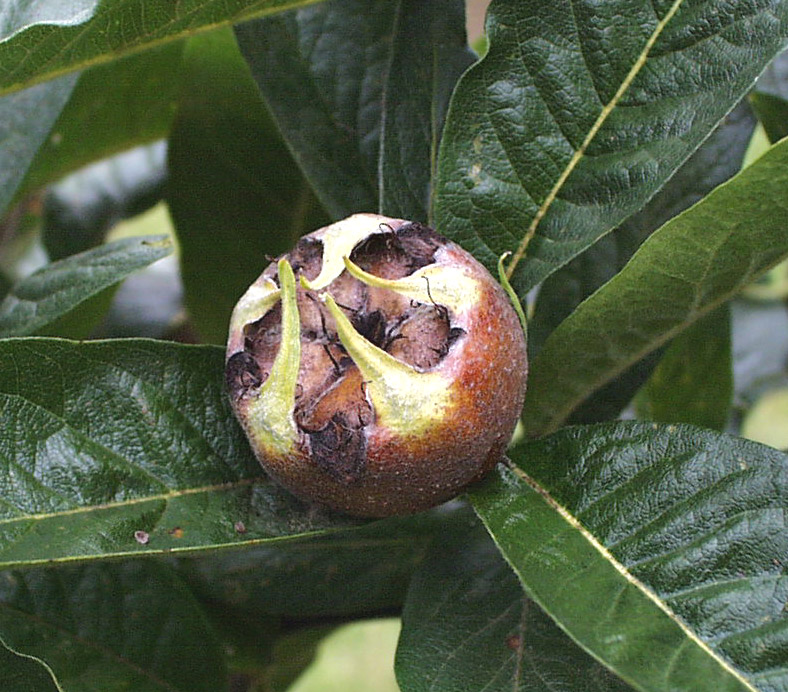
Medlar fruit, cv. 'Nefle Precoce'

Mespilus, commonly called medlar, is a monotypic genus of flowering plants in the family Rosaceae containing the single species Mespilus germanica of southwest Asia. It is also found in some countries in the Balkans, especially in Albanian, Macedonian and Bulgarian regions, and in Azerbaijan and Caucasian Georgia. A second proposed species, Mespilus canescens, discovered in North America in 1990, proved to be a hybrid between M. germanica and one or more species of hawthorn, and is properly known as × Crataemespilus canescens.

== Plant ==
Mespilus forms deciduous large shrubs to small trees growing up to 8 m (26 ft) tall. The fruit is a matte brown pome.

== History ==
Mespilus germanica is apparently native only to southwest Asia and southeastern Europe, i.e. near the Black Sea coast and western Mediterranean, and Asia Minor, as well as the Caucasus and northern Iran, but it has an ancient history of cultivation and wild plants exist in a much wider area; it was grown by the ancient Greeks and Romans, beginning in the second century BC. It was a very popular fruit in Western Europe during the Middle Ages, but has fallen out of favour there.

=== Extant Species ===
Image	Scientific name	Common name	Distribution
	Mespilus canescens	Stern's medlar	Prairie County, Arkansas, United States
	Mespilus germanica	medlar or common medlar	Tabaristan (Iran), southwest Asia and also southeastern Europe

== Related plants ==
Within the subfamily Amygdaloideae, Mespilus is most closely related to Crataegus, Amelanchier, Peraphyllum, and Malacomeles.

Many authors group Mespilus together with Crataegus in a single genus. When thus combined, the correct species name is Crataegus germanica (L.) Kuntze.

The common name "snowy mespilus" attaches to certain species of Amelanchier, notably Amelanchier × lamarckii and Amelanchier ovalis.

The genus Eriobotrya was once considered to be closely related to Mespilus. The loquat, one of several Eriobotrya species, was formerly thought to be closely related to the genus Mespilus, and is still sometimes known in some European countries as a medlar and is still sometimes called the "Japanese medlar".

== Fruit ==
Mespilus germanica features an unusual apple-like fruit. In southern Europe, the medlar fruit ripen fully and can be eaten off the tree, but in northern climates, they require bletting to eat. This process involves ripening fruit off the tree, usually in a bowl, until soft. Each fruit contains a half dozen or so hard, irregularly shaped seeds that require stratification to germinate. Many cultivars exist, and they are increasingly popular selections carried by perennial and edible landscaping nurseries in North America.
