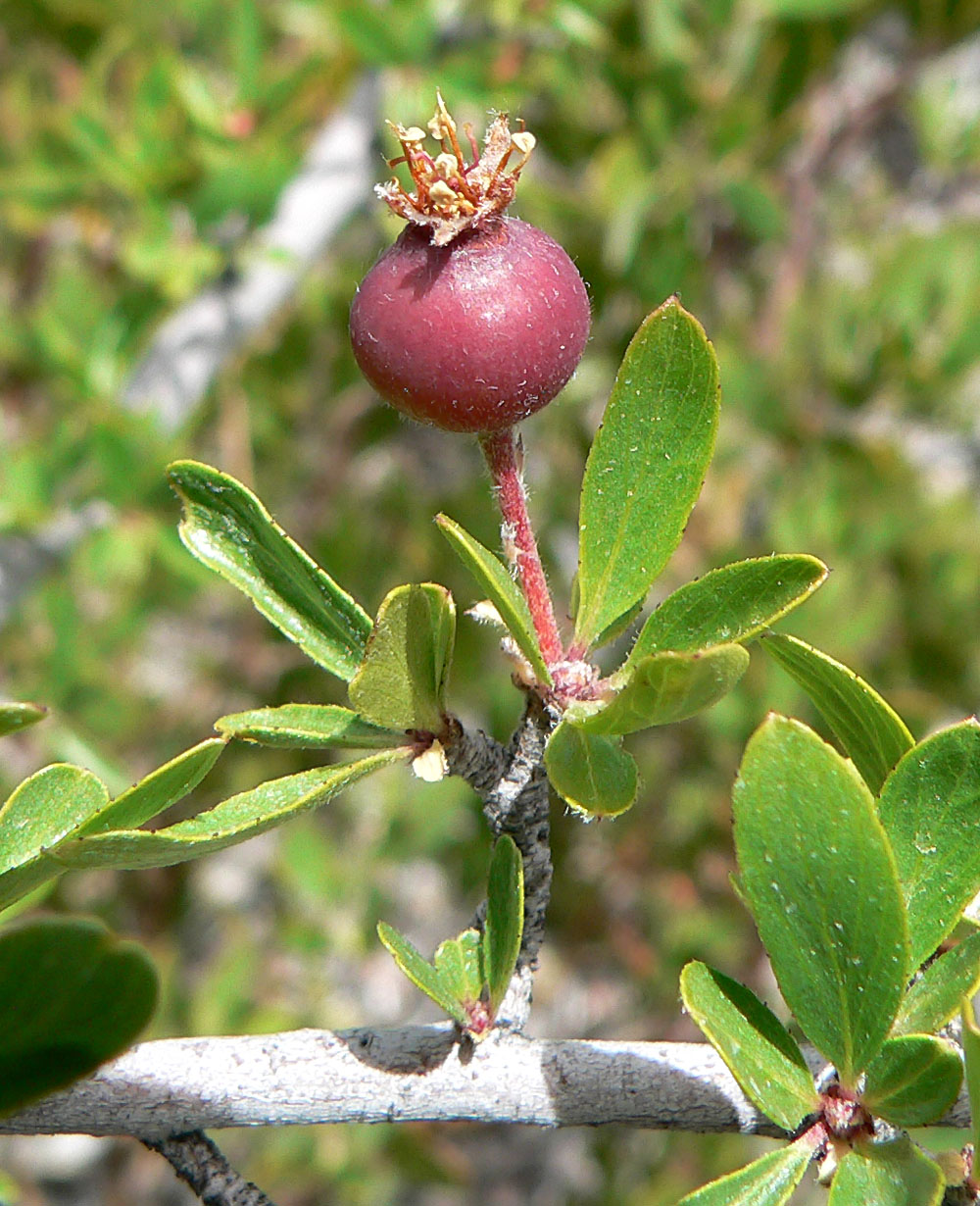

Conservation status
- Apparently Secure (NatureServe)

Scientific classification
- Kingdom: Plantae
- Clade: Tracheophytes
- Clade: Angiosperms
- Clade: Eudicots
- Clade: Rosids
- Order: Rosales
- Family: Rosaceae
- Subfamily: Amygdaloideae
- Tribe: Maleae
- Subtribe: Malinae
- Genus: Peraphyllum; Nutt.
- Species: P. ramosissimum

Binomial name
- Peraphyllum ramosissimum Nutt.

= Peraphyllum =

Peraphyllum Peraphyllum ramosissimum

Genus of flowering plants

Peraphyllum is a monotypic genus of flowering plants in the rose family, containing the single species Peraphyllum ramosissimum, commonly known as wild crab apple.

== Description ==
Peraphyllum ramosissimum is a shrub which may reach 3 metres (10 ft) in height. Growing up to 3.5 centimetres (1 1/2 in) long, the leaves are simple; they can grow very close together on short shoots but are well separated on longer shoots.

Like most other flowering plants of the Rosaceae, P. ramosissimum has 5 petals and 5 sepals with radial symmetry. The flowers have about 15–20 free stamens, and the petals are white to rose in color. The fruit is a yellowish to purplish pome about 1 centimetre (1/2 in) wide.

== Taxonomy ==
Translated from the Greek, the genus Peraphyllum means "very leafy" and the species name ramosissimum means "many branches". Peraphyllum is most closely related to Amelanchier, Malacomeles, Crataegus, and Mespilus.

== Distribution and habitat ==
Peraphyllum ramosissimum grows in Washington, California, Oregon, Idaho, Utah, Colorado, and New Mexico, usually in pine and juniper woodlands. In California it can be found in the High Cascades, High Sierra Nevada, Great Basin, and Mojave Desert sky islands.

== Uses ==
The ripe pome is edible and sweetish but has a bitter aftertaste.
