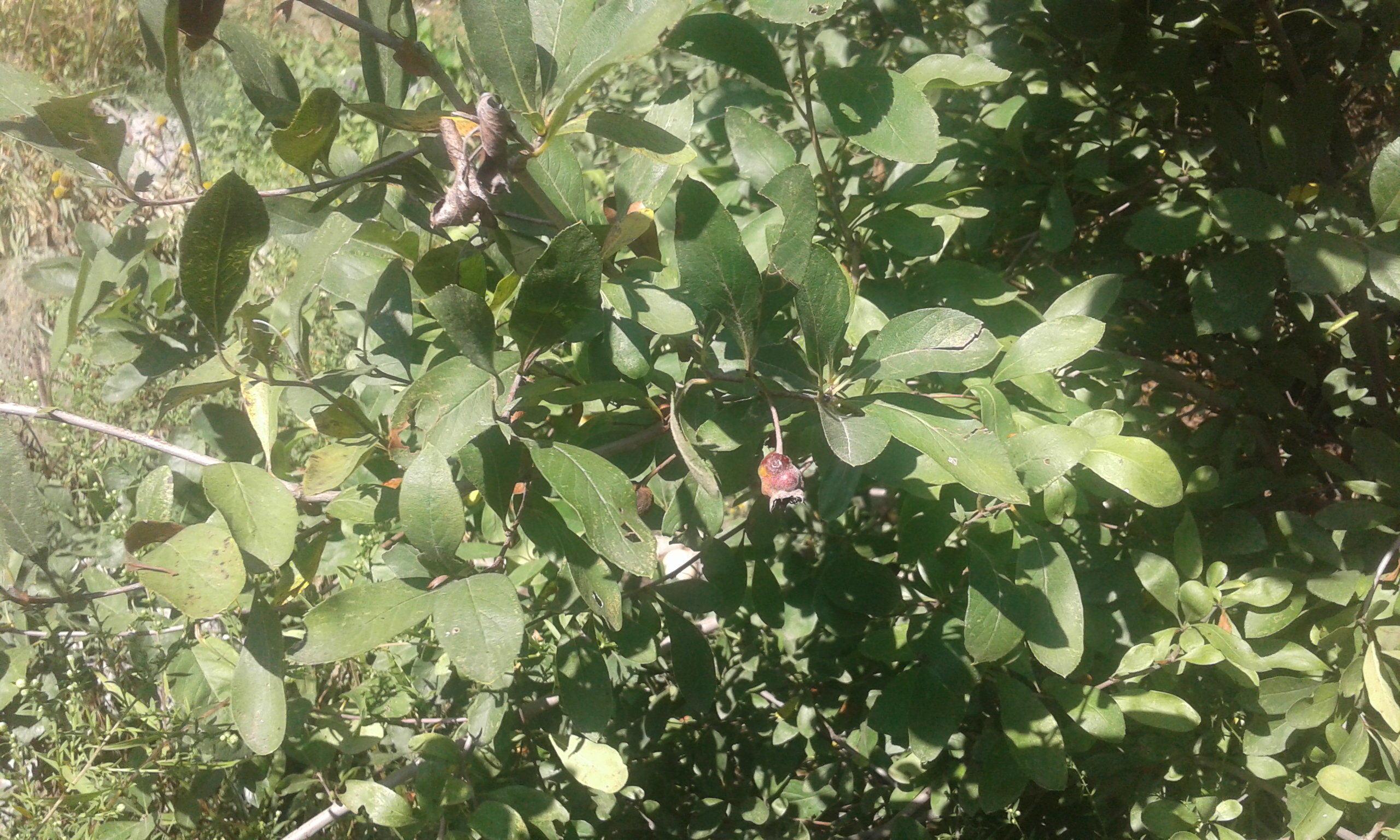

Conservation status
- Critically Endangered (IUCN 3.1)

- Critically Imperiled (NatureServe)

Scientific classification
- Kingdom: Plantae
- Clade: Tracheophytes
- Clade: Angiosperms
- Clade: Eudicots
- Clade: Rosids
- Order: Rosales
- Family: Rosaceae
- Genus: Mespilus
- Species: M. canescens

Binomial name
- Mespilus canescens J.B.Phipps

= Mespilus canescens =

Species of tree

Mespilus canescens, commonly known as Stern's medlar, is a large shrub or small tree, recently discovered in Prairie County, Arkansas, United States, and formally named in 1990. It is a critically endangered endemic species, with only 25 plants known, all in one small (9 ha) wood, now protected as the Konecny Grove Natural Area.

Originally discovered by Jane Stern (hence "Stern's medlar") in 1968–69, the plant was difficult to identify, and at times placed in the genus Crataegus, and even Aronia. J. B. Phipps first described it as belonging to the genus Mespilus in 1990.

It has been shown by genetic analysis to be closely related to the common medlar Mespilus germanica, which was previously the only known species in the genus. Subsequent molecular analyses suggest that Stern's medlar is likely a hybrid between cultivated M. germanica and one or two native North American species of Crataegus, in which case it should be referred to as × Crataemespilus canescens.

== Description ==
Thorns are sparse, 2–3 cm (0.8–1.2 in) long. The leaves are 2–4 cm (0.8–1.6 in) long. The five-petalled white flowers are produced in late spring. The fruit is an almost spherical pome, 8–12 mm (0.3–0.5 in) diameter; it differs from common medlar fruit in being deep glossy red when ripe (not brown).

== Uses ==
While Stern's medlar has been noted for its great horticultural potential, the plant is cultivated mainly for botanical purposes.

== See also ==
- Flora of Arkansas
