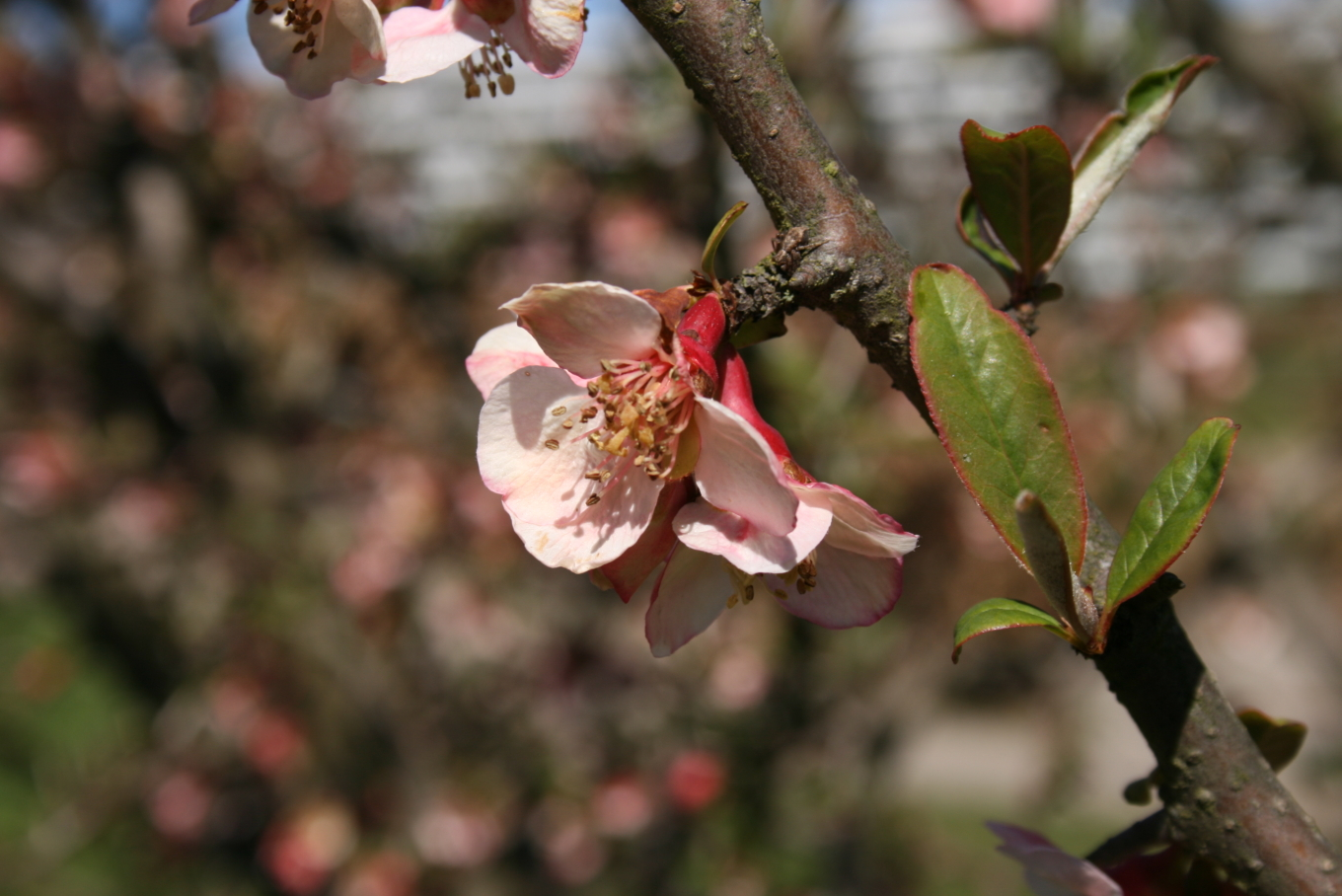
- Flower of Chaenomeles tibetica

Scientific classification
- Kingdom: Plantae
- Clade: Tracheophytes
- Clade: Angiosperms
- Clade: Eudicots
- Clade: Rosids
- Order: Rosales
- Family: Rosaceae
- Genus: Chaenomeles
- Species: C. thibetica

Binomial name
- Chaenomeles thibetica (T.T.Yu)

= Chaenomeles thibetica =

Species of plant

Chaenomeles thibetica is a species of flowering plant in the family Rosaceae. It is a tree or shrub, usually thorny, 1.5-3.0 m tall. It is native to Tibet and south-central China, and grows among shrubs in mountain valleys and on slopes. It has showy pink flowers in summer, and fruits from late summer to early autumn.
