= Japonica =

Japonica may refer to:

- Latin for "of Japan"
- Japonica, a British common name for garden plants of genus Chaenomeles (flowering quince) including Chaenomeles japonica and others
- Camellia japonica, the common or Japanese camellia
- Japonica, subgenus of Fritillaria flowering bulbous perennial plants
- Japonica rice, a major variety of Asian rice
- Japonica (butterfly), a butterfly genus in the Theclinae subfamily
- 'Japonica' group, species group of Caenorhabditis nematodes, including Caenorhabditis japonica and others
- Japonica, an SOE F Section network in the Second World War
