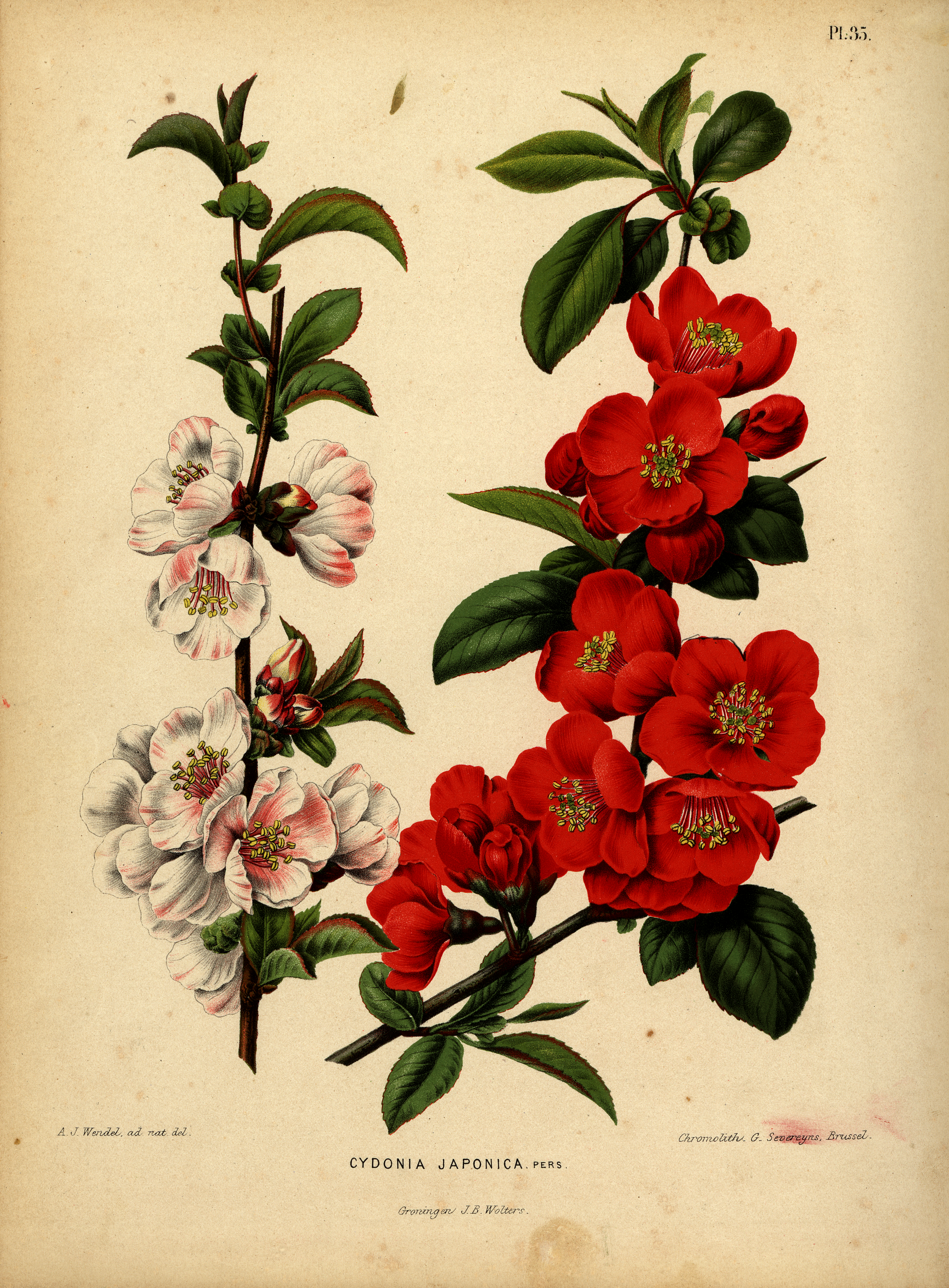
- Illustration by A.J. Wendel, 1868

Scientific classification
- Kingdom: Plantae
- Clade: Tracheophytes
- Clade: Angiosperms
- Clade: Eudicots
- Clade: Rosids
- Order: Rosales
- Family: Rosaceae
- Genus: Chaenomeles
- Species: C. speciosa

Binomial name
- Chaenomeles speciosa (Sweet) Nak.

Synonyms
- Chaenomeles lagenaria (Loisel.) Koidz.; Cydonia lagenaria Loisel.; Cydonia speciosa Sweet; Pyrus japonica Sims. non Thunb.

= Chaenomeles speciosa =

Species of flowering plant

Chaenomeles speciosa, the flowering quince, Chinese quince or Japanese quince, is a thorny deciduous or semi-evergreen shrub native to eastern Asia. It is taller than another commonly cultivated species, C. japonica, usually growing to about 2 m (6 ft 7 in). The flowers are usually red, but may be pink, white or green. The fruit is a fragrant, hard pome that resembles a quince.

== Cultivation ==
This plant is widely cultivated in temperate regions for its twining habit and its showy flowers which appear early in the season, occasionally even in midwinter. It is frequently used as an informal low hedge. Numerous cultivars with flowers in shades of white, pink and red have been selected. The following cultivars and hybrids have gained the Royal Horticultural Society's Award of Garden Merit:

The following cultivars have received the Royal Horticultural Society's Award of Garden Merit:

- 'Geisha Girl' (salmon pink)
- 'Moerloosei' (scarlet)
- 'Pink Lady' (pink)

== See also ==
- Pseudocydonia (C. sinensis), also called mugua and Chinese quince
- Papaya, a tropical fruit that shares the name mugua
