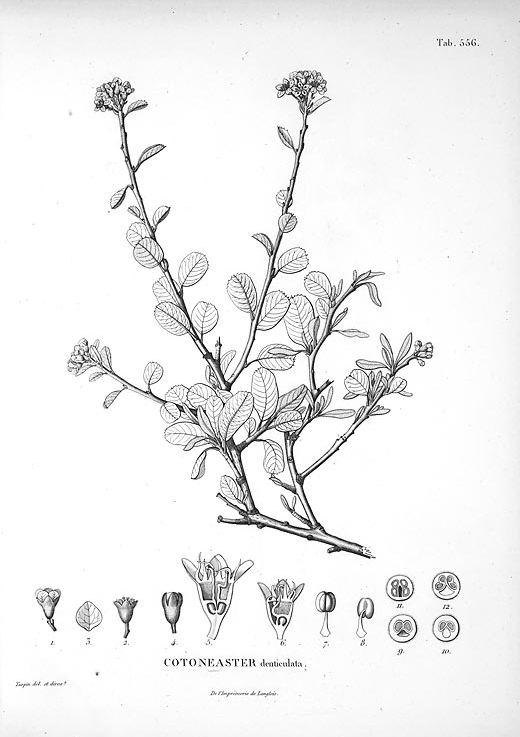
- Malacomeles denticulata syn.: Cotoneaster denticulata Illustration by Pierre Jean François Turpin from Kunth, Bonpland, and Humboldt's Nova genera et species plantarum

Scientific classification
- Kingdom: Plantae
- Clade: Tracheophytes
- Clade: Angiosperms
- Clade: Eudicots
- Clade: Rosids
- Order: Rosales
- Family: Rosaceae
- Subfamily: Amygdaloideae
- Tribe: Maleae
- Subtribe: Malinae
- Genus: Malacomeles (Decne.) Engl.

Species
- See here

= Malacomeles =

Genus of flowering plants

Malacomeles, or false serviceberry, is a genus of flowering plants in the Rosaceae. It is most closely related to Amelanchier, Peraphyllum, Crataegus, and Mespilus.

== Species ==
The following species are recognised in the genus Malacomeles:

- Malacomeles denticulata (Kunth) Decne.
- Malacomeles nervosa (Decne.) G.N.Jones
- Malacomeles paniculata (Rehder) J.B.Phipps
- Malacomeles pringlei (Koehne) B.L.Turner
- Malacomeles psilantha (C.K.Schneid.) B.L.Turner
