= Bletting =

Process of softening that certain fleshy fruits undergo, beyond ripening

Bletting is a process of softening that certain fleshy fruits undergo, beyond ripening.

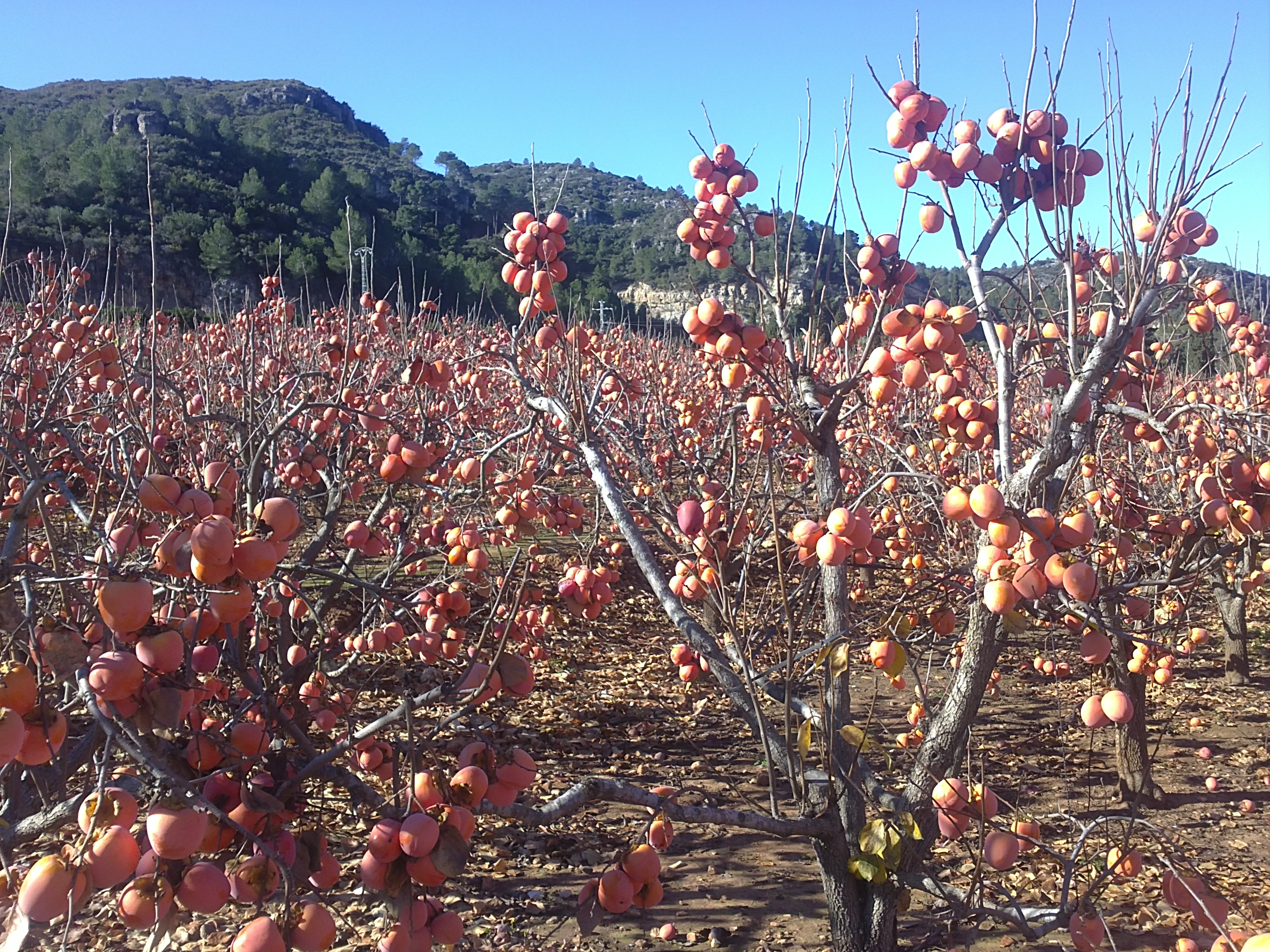
A persimmon tree orchard holding and bletting fruit in late December.

There are some fruits that are either sweeter after some bletting, such as sea buckthorn, or for which most varieties can be eaten raw only after bletting, such as medlars, persimmons, quince, service tree fruit, and wild service tree fruit (popularly known as chequers). The rowan or mountain ash fruit must be bletted and cooked to be edible, to break down the toxic parasorbic acid (hexenollactone) into sorbic acid. Common in nature, bletting is found in some wild species of pear, apple, hawthorn, plum, viburnum, persimmon, rose, and blueberry.

== History ==
The English verb to blet was coined by John Lindley, in his Introduction to Botany (1835). He derived it from the French poire blette meaning 'overripe pear'. "After the period of ripeness", he wrote, "most fleshy fruits undergo a new kind of alteration; their flesh either rots or blets."

In "The Prologe of the Reeves Tale" in Geoffrey Chaucer's 14th century Tales of Caunterbury (lines 3871–3873) the Reeve complains about being old: "But if I fare as dooth an open-ers -- / That ilke fruyt is ever lenger the wers, / Til it be roten in mullok or in stree." [Unless I fare as does the fruit of the medlar -- / That same fruit continually grows worse, / Until it is rotten in rubbish or in straw]. In Shakespeare's Measure for Measure, he alluded to bletting when he wrote (IV. iii. 167) "They would have married me to the rotten Medler." Thomas Dekker also draws a similar comparison in his play The Honest Whore: "I scarce know her, for the beauty of her cheek hath, like the moon, suffered strange eclipses since I beheld it: women are like medlars – no sooner ripe but rotten." Elsewhere in literature, D. H. Lawrence dubbed medlars "wineskins of brown morbidity."

There is also an old saying, used in Don Quixote, that "time and straw make medlars ripe", referring to the bletting process.

== Process ==
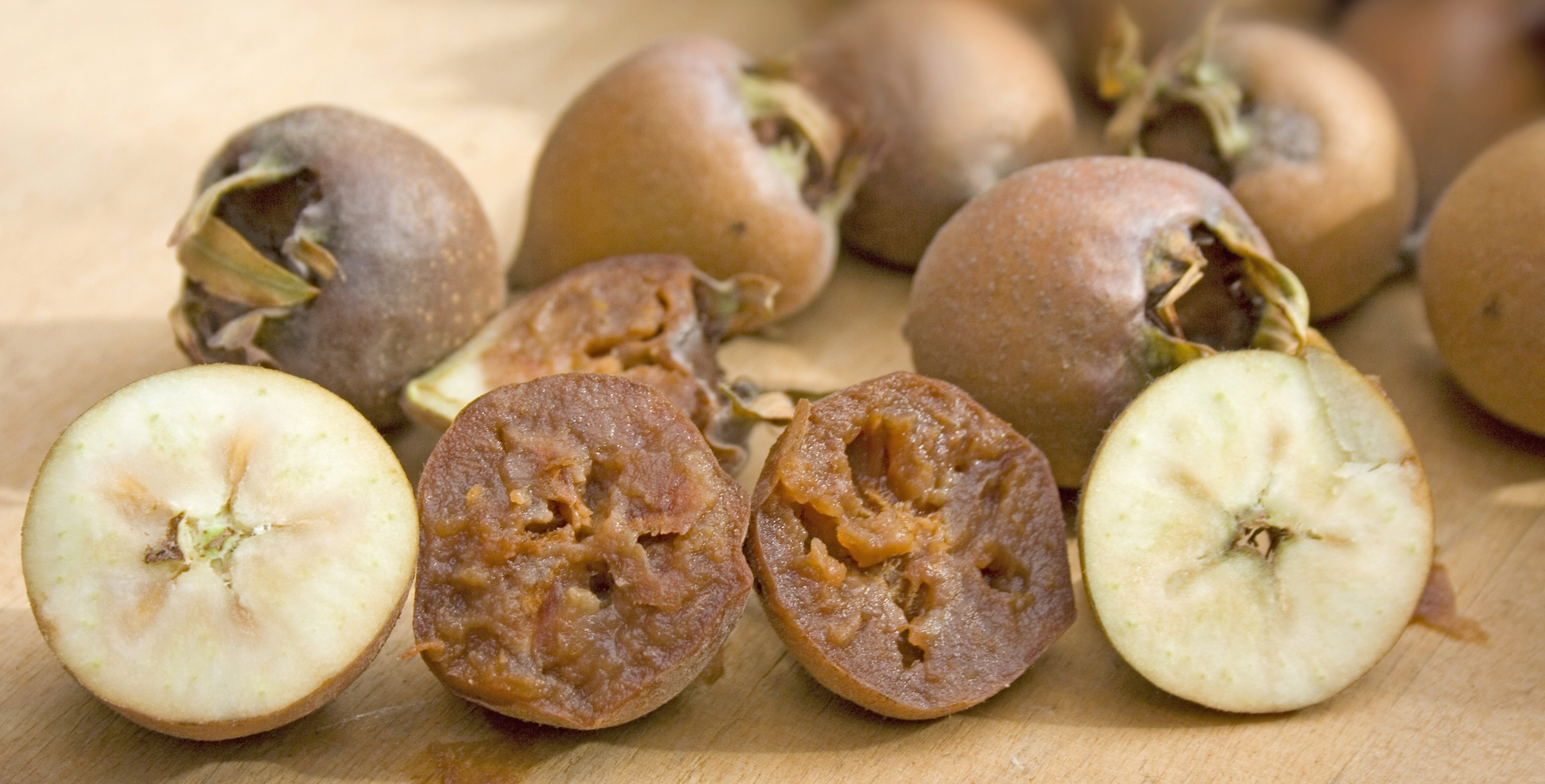
Bletted (center) and ripe but still inedible medlars (left and right)

Chemically speaking, bletting brings about an increase in sugars and a decrease in the acids and tannins that make the unripe fruit astringent.

Ripe medlars, for example, are taken from the tree, placed somewhere cool, and allowed to further ripen for several weeks. In Trees and Shrubs, horticulturist F. A. Bush wrote about medlars that "if the fruit is wanted it should be left on the tree until late October and stored until it appears in the first stages of decay; then it is ready for eating. More often the fruit is used for making jelly." Ideally, the fruit should be harvested from the tree immediately following a hard frost, which starts the bletting process by breaking down cell walls and speeding softening.

Once the process is complete, the medlar flesh will have broken down enough that it can be spooned out of the skin. The taste of the sticky, mushy substance has been compared to sweet dates and dry apple sauce, with a hint of cinnamon. In Notes on a Cellar-Book, the great English oenophile George Saintsbury called bletted medlars the "ideal fruit to accompany wine."

== See also ==
- Climacteric (botany) – Stage of ripening in some fruits
- Date palm – Palm tree cultivated for its sweet fruit, whose tamr (ripe, sun-dried) stage is similar to bletting
- Fermentation – Metabolic redox process producing energy in the absence of oxygen
- Fermentation in food processing – Converting carbohydrates to alcohol or acids using anaerobic microorganisms
- Industrial fermentation – Biochemical process applied in industrial production
- Ice wine – Dessert wine produced from frozen grapes
- Persistence (botany) – Retention of plant organs that normally are shed, common in bletting fruit
