= Pome =

Fruit with apple-like features

Anatomy of apple pome compared to a pea pod. Botanically, a fruit is derived from a carpel; apples normally have five carpels, while a pea pod is a single carpel. The flesh of the apple is derived from the swollen receptacle that surrounds the carpels.

In botany, a pome is a type of fruit produced by flowering plants in the subtribe Malinae of the family Rosaceae. Pomes consist of a central 'core' containing multiple small seeds, which is enveloped by a tough membrane and surrounded by an edible layer of flesh. Many, but not all, pome fruit trees are deciduous, and undergo a dormant winter period that requires cold temperatures to break dormancy in spring. Well-known pomes include the apple, pear, loquat, and quince.

== Etymology ==
The word pome entered English in the late 14th century, and referred to an apple or an apple-shaped object. It derived from the Old French word for apple: pome (12th century; modern French is pomme), which in turn derived from the Late Latin or Vulgar Latin word poma 'apple', originally the plural of Latin pomum 'fruit', later 'apple'.

== Morphology ==
A pome is an accessory fruit composed of one or more carpels surrounded by accessory tissue. The accessory tissue is interpreted by some specialists as an extension of the receptacle and is then referred to as 'fruit cortex', and by others as a fused hypanthium (floral cup). It is the most edible part of this fruit.

The carpels of a pome are fused within the core. Although the epicarp, mesocarp, and endocarp of some other fruit types look very much like the skin, flesh, and core respectively of a pome, they are parts of the carpel (see above diagram). The epicarp and mesocarp of a pome may be fleshy and difficult to distinguish from one another and from the hypanthial tissue. The endocarp forms a leathery or stony case around the seed, and corresponds to what is commonly called the core.

A pome-type fruit with a stony rather than a leathery endocarp may be called a polypyrenous drupe.

The shriveled remains of the sepals, style and stamens can sometimes be seen at the end of a pome opposite the stem, and the ovary is therefore often described as inferior in these flowers.

== Examples ==
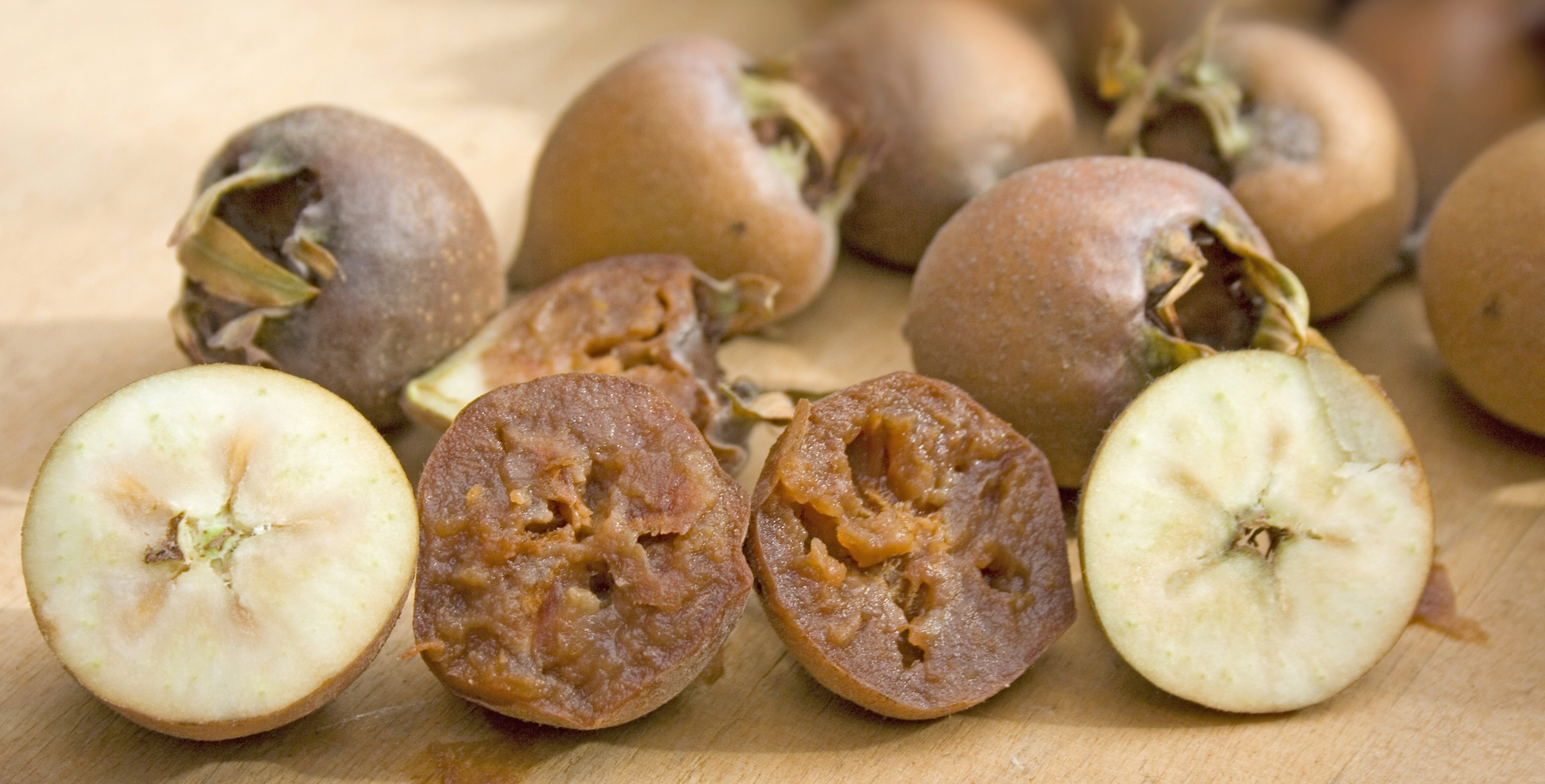
Pomes of common medlar, Mespilus germanica

The best-known example of a pome is the apple. Other examples of plants that produce fruit classified as a pome are Cotoneaster, Crataegus (hawthorn and mayhaw), medlar, pear, Pyracantha, quince, rowan, loquat, toyon, and whitebeam.

Some pomes may have a mealy texture (e.g., some apples); others (e.g., Amelanchier, Aronia) are berry-like with juicy flesh and a core that is not very noticeable.

== See also ==
- Nut (fruit)
