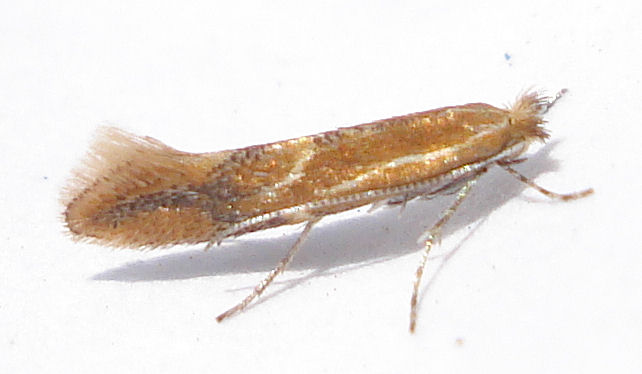

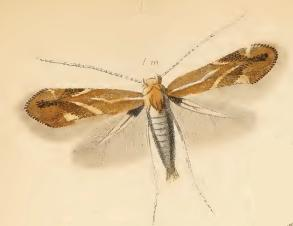

Scientific classification
- Domain: Eukaryota
- Kingdom: Animalia
- Phylum: Arthropoda
- Class: Insecta
- Order: Lepidoptera
- Family: Gracillariidae
- Genus: Phyllonorycter
- Species: P. corylifoliella

Binomial name
- Phyllonorycter corylifoliella (Hubner, 1796)

Synonyms
- Tinea corylifoliella Hubner, 1796; Lithocolletis betulae Zeller, 1839

= Phyllonorycter corylifoliella =

Species of moth

Phyllonorycter corylifoliella, the hawthorn red midget moth, is a moth of the family Gracillariidae. It is found in all of Europe.

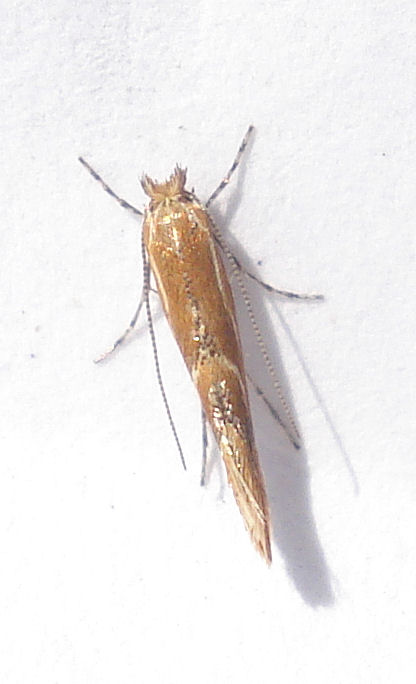

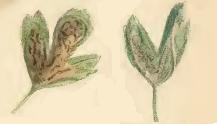
Two mined hawthorn leaves

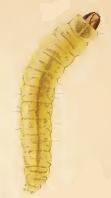
Larva

The wingspan is 8–9 mm. The forewings are reddish-ochreous, posteriorly or sometimes almost wholly suffused with blackish-grey blotches; a slender white median streak from base to near middle, with a marked sinuation downwards; a slender oblique white streak from the middle of costa, and another from the middle of dorsum; sometimes a whitish tornal dot and anteapical strigula. Hind wings are grey or dark grey. The larva is pale yellowish; dorsal line green; head pale brownish.

Adults are on wing in May and again in August in two generations.

The larvae feed on Amelanchier lamarckii, Amelanchier ovalis, Betula pendula, Betula pubescens, Chaenomeles japonica, Cotoneaster nebrodensis, Crataegus laevigata, Crataegus monogyna, Cydonia oblonga, Malus domestica, Malus sylvestris, Mespilus germanica, Prunus avium, Pyrus amygdaliformis, Pyrus communis, Sorbus aria, Sorbus aucuparia, Sorbus domestica, Sorbus torminalis and Spiraea species. They mine the leaves of their host plant.
