= Stigmella magdalenae =

Scientific classification
- Kingdom: Animalia
- Phylum: Arthropoda
- Clade: Pancrustacea
- Class: Insecta
- Order: Lepidoptera
- Family: Nepticulidae
- Genus: Stigmella
- Species: S. magdalenae

Binomial name
- Stigmella magdalenae (Klimesch, 1950)

Synonyms
- Nepticula magdalenae Klimesch, 1950

Species of moth

Stigmella magdalenae is a moth of the family Nepticulidae. It is found from Scandinavia and Finland to the Pyrenees, Italy and Bulgaria, and from Ireland to central Russia and Ukraine.

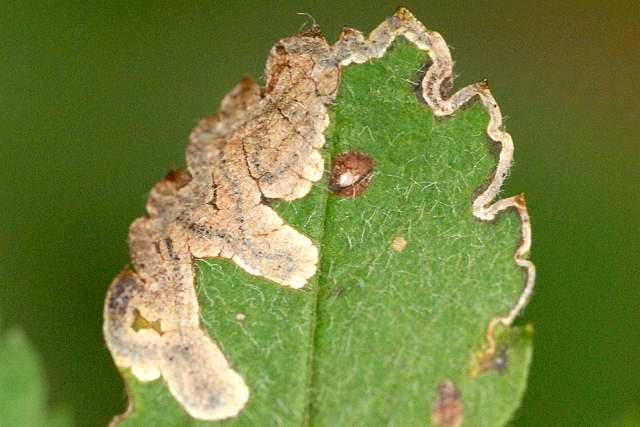
Stigmella magdalenae mine

The wingspan is 4–5 mm.A tiny bronze-coloured moth. The antennae are filamentous, dark and about half as long as the forewing. The innermost, greatly expanded joint is white, the head is covered with yellowish-brown or brownish hairs, at the back with a white collar. The body is dark. The forewings are yellowish-grey with a faint bronze sheen, without any pale transverse band. The hind wing is narrow, grey, with long fringes.

The larvae feed on Amelanchier ovalis, Amelanchier spicata, Cotoneaster integerrimus, Malus sylvestris, Sorbus aucuparia and Sorbus torminalis. They mine the leaves of their host plant.

The species has one generation each summer that flies in May–June or July. The caterpillar makes a rather short, narrow sinuous mine.

Certain identification requires microscopic examination of the genitalia.
