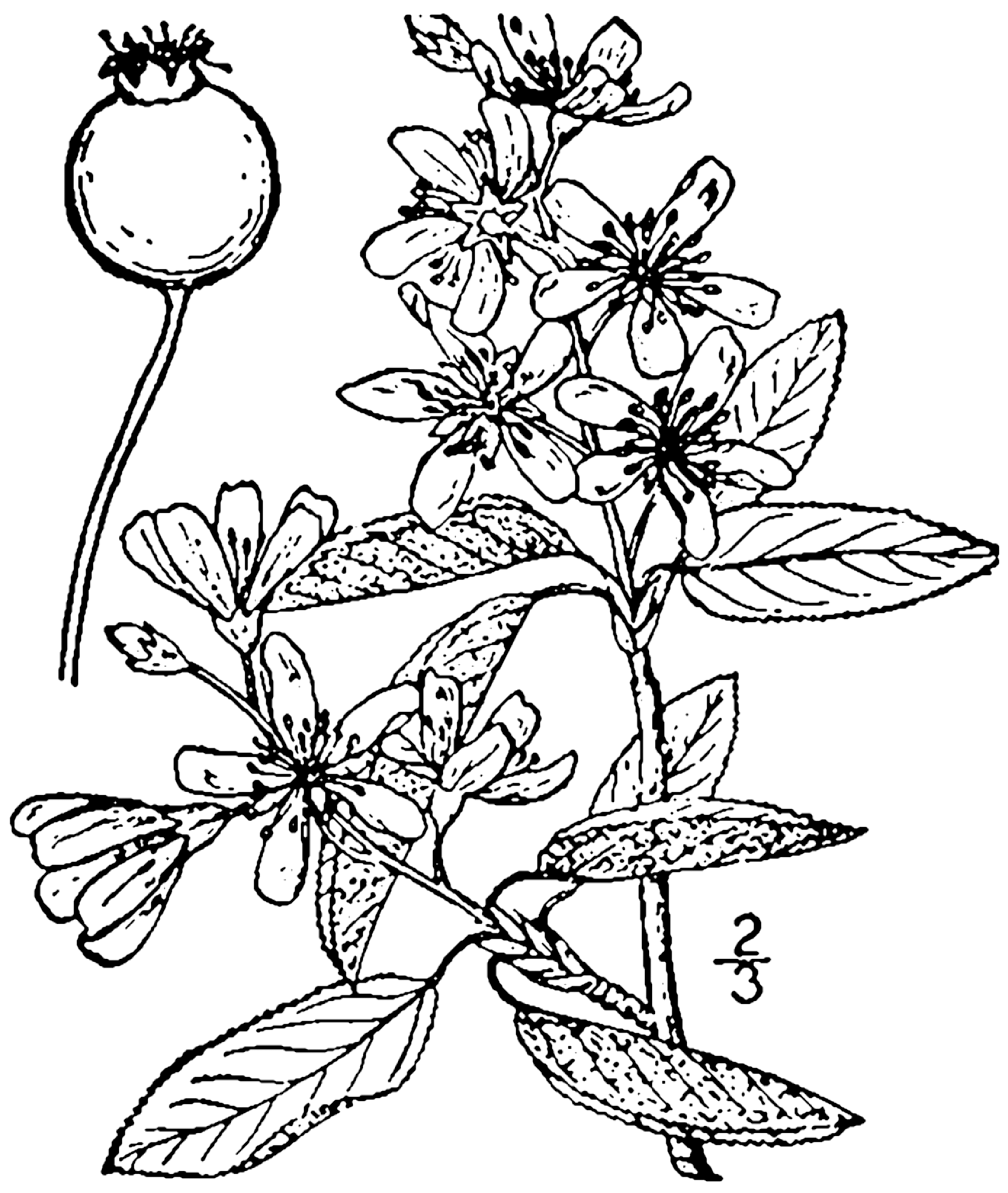

Scientific classification
- Kingdom: Plantae
- Clade: Tracheophytes
- Clade: Angiosperms
- Clade: Eudicots
- Clade: Rosids
- Order: Rosales
- Family: Rosaceae
- Genus: Amelanchier
- Species: A. intermedia

Binomial name
- Amelanchier intermedia Spach, Hist. Nat. Vég. (Spach) ii. 85 (1834).

= Amelanchier intermedia =

Species of plant

Amelanchier intermedia, also known as intermediate serviceberry, shadbush or juneberry, is a wetland shrub, thought to be a hybrid of A. canadensis and A. laevis.

It is distinguished from A. canadensis by its sparser pubescence, and from A. laevis by the weaker red colouration.
