= Carex crebriflora =

Scientific classification
- Kingdom: Plantae
- Clade: Tracheophytes
- Clade: Angiosperms
- Clade: Monocots
- Clade: Commelinids
- Order: Poales
- Family: Cyperaceae
- Genus: Carex
- Species: C. crebriflora

Binomial name
- Carex crebriflora Wiegand

Species of flowering plant

Carex crebriflora, the coastal plain sedge, is a species of flowering plant in the family Cyperaceae, native to Texas and the southeastern United States. It is typically found growing less than 100 m (330 ft) above sea level in the understory of wet deciduous or mixed deciduous-evergreen forests, preferring alluvial, sandy soils.
