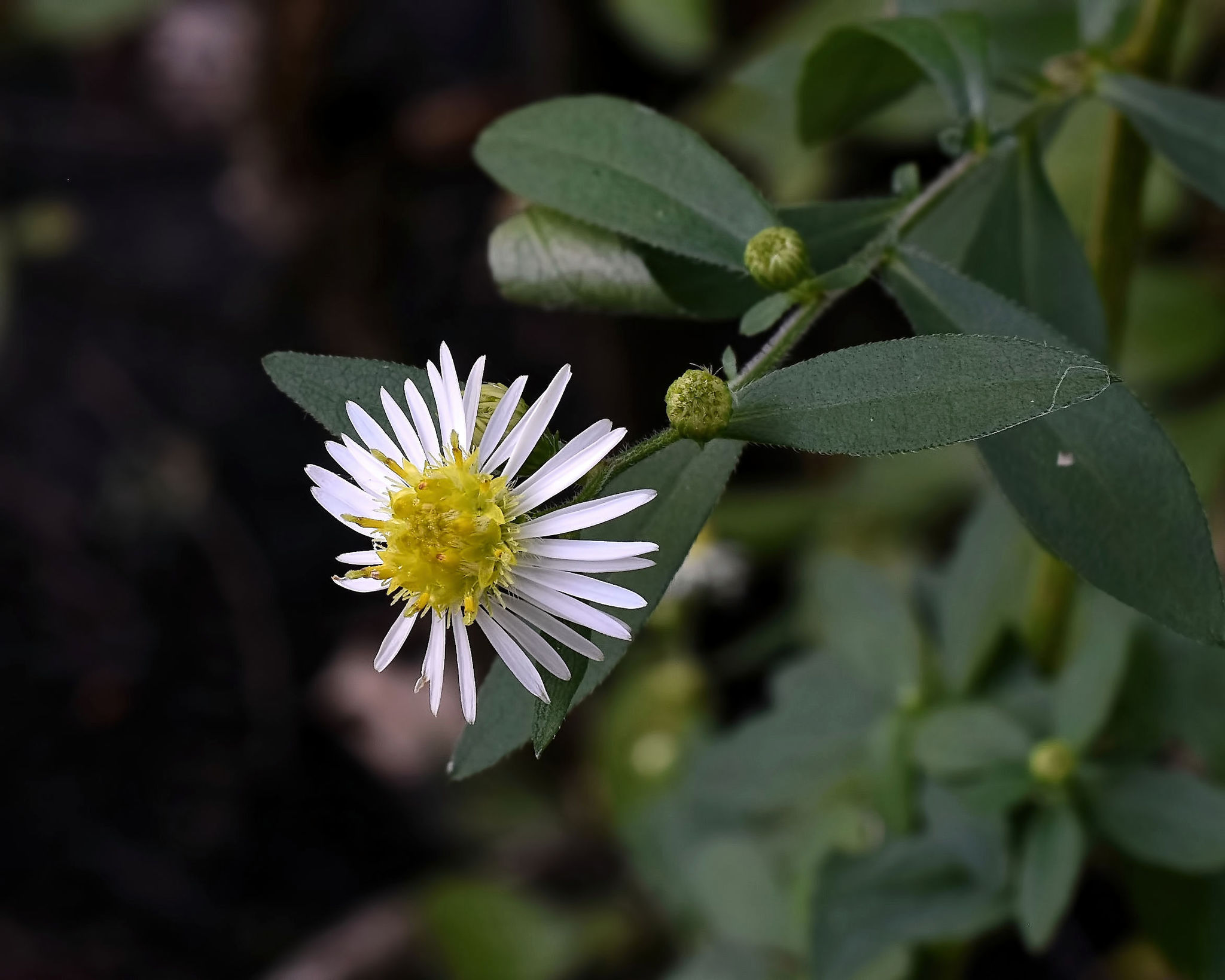

Conservation status
- Secure (NatureServe)

Scientific classification
- Kingdom: Plantae
- Clade: Embryophytes
- Clade: Tracheophytes
- Clade: Spermatophytes
- Clade: Angiosperms
- Clade: Eudicots
- Clade: Asterids
- Order: Asterales
- Family: Asteraceae
- Genus: Symphyotrichum
- Subgenus: Symphyotrichum subg. Symphyotrichum
- Section: Symphyotrichum sect. Symphyotrichum
- Species: S. ontarionis

Binomial name
- Symphyotrichum ontarionis (Wiegand) G.L.Nesom

Varieties
- S. ontarionis var. ontarionis; S. ontarionis var. glabratum (Semple) Brouillet & Bouchard
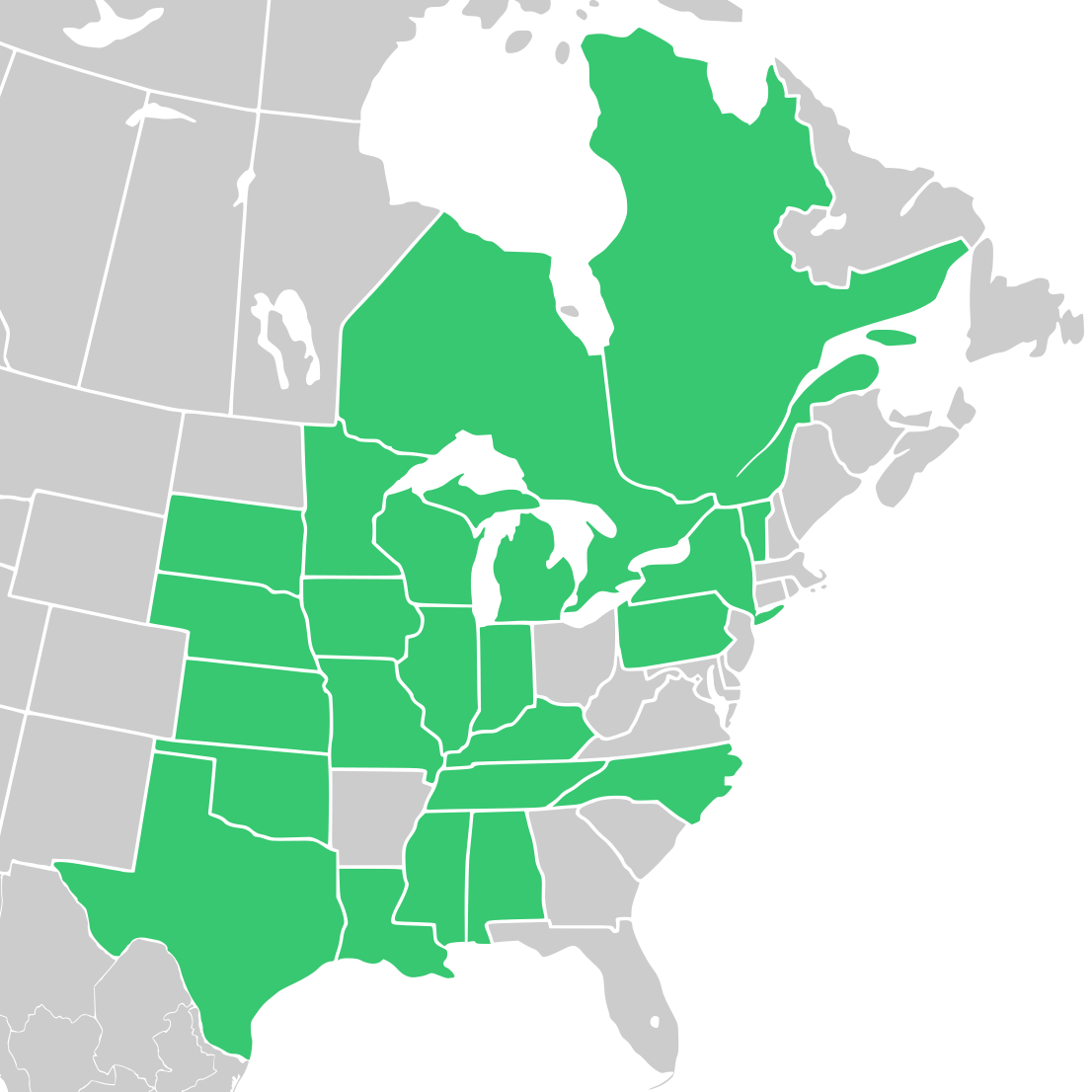
- Native distribution

Synonyms
- Alphabetical list: Aster diffusus var. thyrsoideus A.Gray; Aster lateriflorus var. thyrsoideus E.Sheld.; Aster missouriensis var. thyrsoideus Wiegand; Aster ontariensis Wiegand; Aster ontarionis Wiegand; Aster pantotrichus S.F.Blake; Aster pantotrichus var. thyrsoideus S.F.Blake; Aster tradescantii var. thyrsoideus (A.Gray) B.Boivin

= Symphyotrichum ontarionis =

Species of plant in the aster family

Symphyotrichum ontarionis (formerly Aster ontarionis) is a species of flowering plant in the family Asteraceae native to eastern North America. Commonly known as Ontario aster and bottomland aster, it is a perennial, herbaceous plant that may reach heights of 120 centimeters (4 feet). Each flower head has many tiny florets put together into what appear as one.

== Description ==
Symphyotrichym ontarionis forms colonies. The plants are 20–120 centimeters (3/4–4 feet) tall with herbaceous stems arising singly from long thick rhizomes. The leaves are alternate and simple. The flowers, produced between July and October, have white ray florets and yellow centers composed of disk florets.

=== Stems ===
Usually, each plant has one stem arising from the rhizome, but there can be as many as three. They are straight and erect, with no hair mid-stem, becoming uniformly hairy farthest away from the base (distally). These hairs can be long and soft or coarse. Symphyotrichum ontarionis var. glabratum may have little to no hair (glabrous) on the distal stems.

=== Leaves ===
Characteristics vary among leaves on the same plant. They occur on the base, stems, and branches and become smaller the farther away from the base they grow. By the time flowers appear, the leaves at the base and on the stem have often withered or fallen.

The leaves are thin, have short hairs on the edges (margins), and come to a point. The backs usually have straight hairs all pointing in more or less the same direction, and the fronts of the leaves are generally the same, sometimes rough to the touch instead. On S. o. var. glabratum, both faces are hairless or nearly so (glabrate).

Basal (bottom) leaves are spatulate to oblanceolate-obovate, and they wither by the time the plant flowers. Their sizes vary in both length and width, measuring about 10–40 mm long by 5–10 mm wide. Their margins are wavy or saw-toothed, and their tips (apices) may be acute to rounded. Their bases narrow gradually (are attenuate). These leaves have a leafstalk (petiole) which may be clearly noticeable or very short, but the basal leaves are not sessile. The petioles have narrow wings, are fringed with hairs (ciliate) and wavy or saw-toothed, and are sheathed at the bottom.

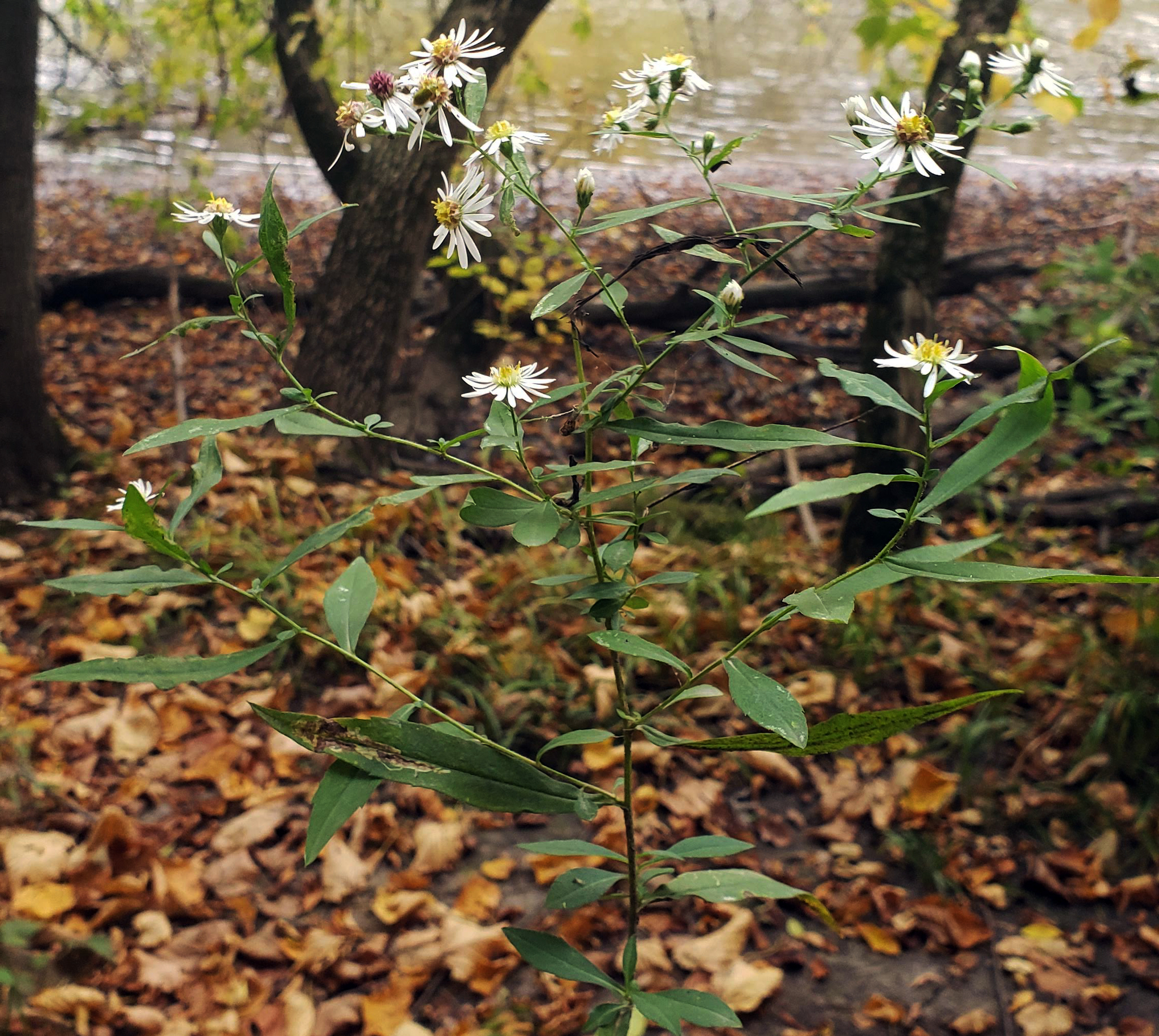
S. ontarionis plant

Lower and middle stem leaves are about 20–80 mm long by 5–35 mm wide. Sizes become progressively smaller the farther they grow from the base. Stem leaves are usually withering by flowering. They are sessile or petiolate, and any petioles have narrow wings that may or may not clasp the stem. The shapes of the stem leaves vary from ovate or lance-ovate to elliptic-lanceolate or oblanceolate. Their margins are wavy or saw-toothed (sometimes coarsely), and their tips (apices) may be acute to acuminate, or short-caudate. Their bases are attenuate to cuneate.

Distal leaves, higher on the stem and on the branches with the flower heads, are sessile. They are elliptic-lanceolate to oblanceolate or lanceolate in shape. Margins are entire (smooth on the edges with no teeth or lobes) or serrulate, apices are acute to acuminate, and bases are cuneate. Sizes ranges from 6–80 mm long (or longer) by 2–25 mm wide. The more distal, the smaller they are, and this size change occurs progressively.

=== Flowers ===
Ontario aster is a late-summer and fall blooming perennial. Ample, open flower heads grow in paniculiform arrays, sometimes secund (to one side) on the upper sides of the branches (known as peduncles). These branched clusters of flowers (known as inflorescences) may be ascending, at almost a right angle (divaricate), or in long arches. The open flower heads are about 13 mm across, or up to about 16 mm with longer rays.

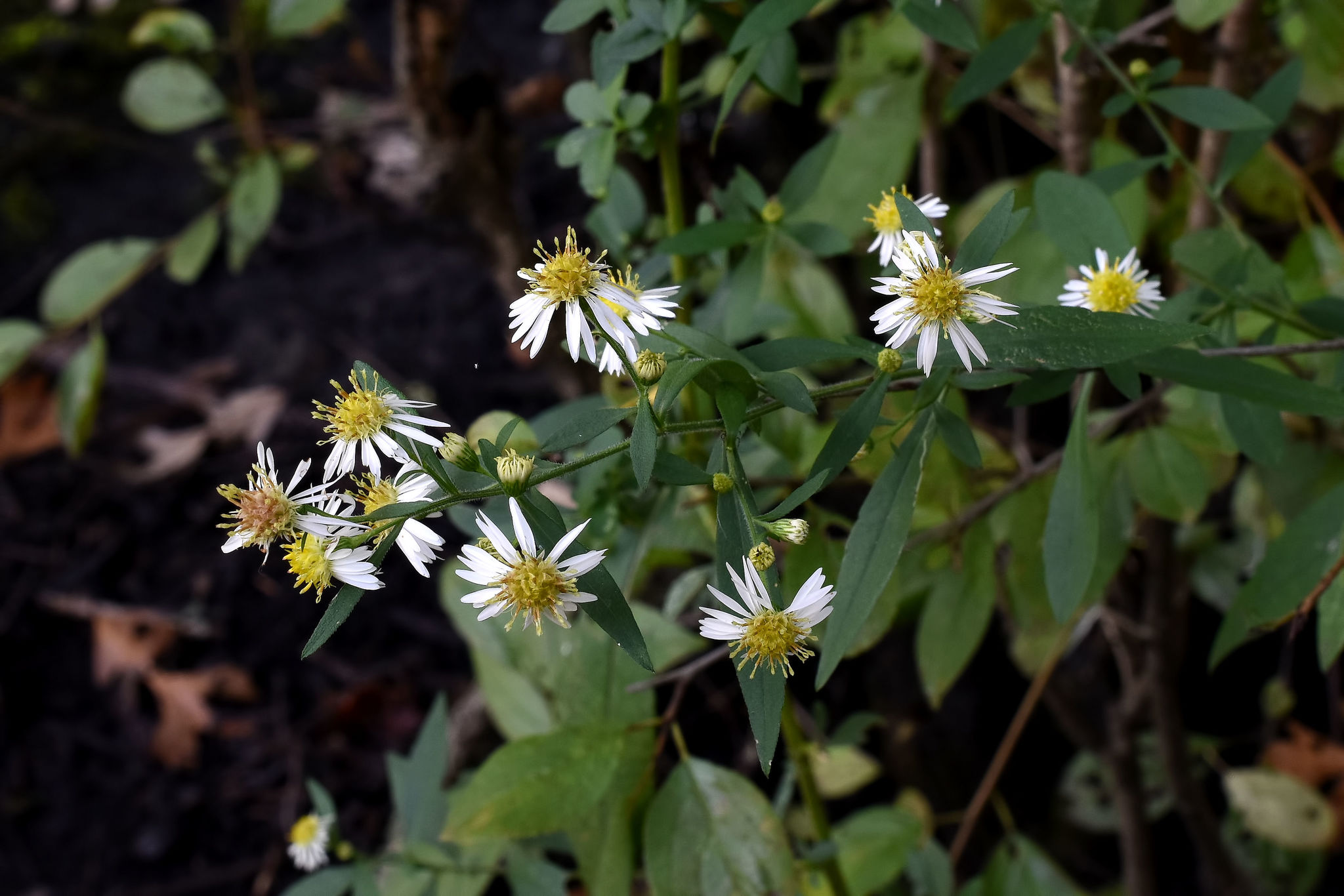
This image shows ray and disk florets, reflexed disk florets, campanulate involucres, phyllary characteristics, and hairy distal leaves on a Symphyotrichum ontarionis var. ontarionis plant.

Flower heads have a peduncle up to 10 mm (Note: Sometimes up to 20 mm) long which may be covered with fine soft hair (pilose). At the base of each flower head are from one to five bracts which look like (and technically are) small leaves that grade into the phyllaries. They are linear-lanceolate and pilose.

==== Involucres and phyllaries ====
In the Asteraceae family, at the base of the head and surrounding the flowers before opening, is a bundle of sepal-like bracts or scales called phyllaries, which together form the involucre that protects the individual flowers in the head before they open. (Note: See Asteraceae § Flowers for more detail.) The involucres of S. ontarionis are campanulate (bell-shaped) once the flower head opens, and are 3–5.5 mm long.

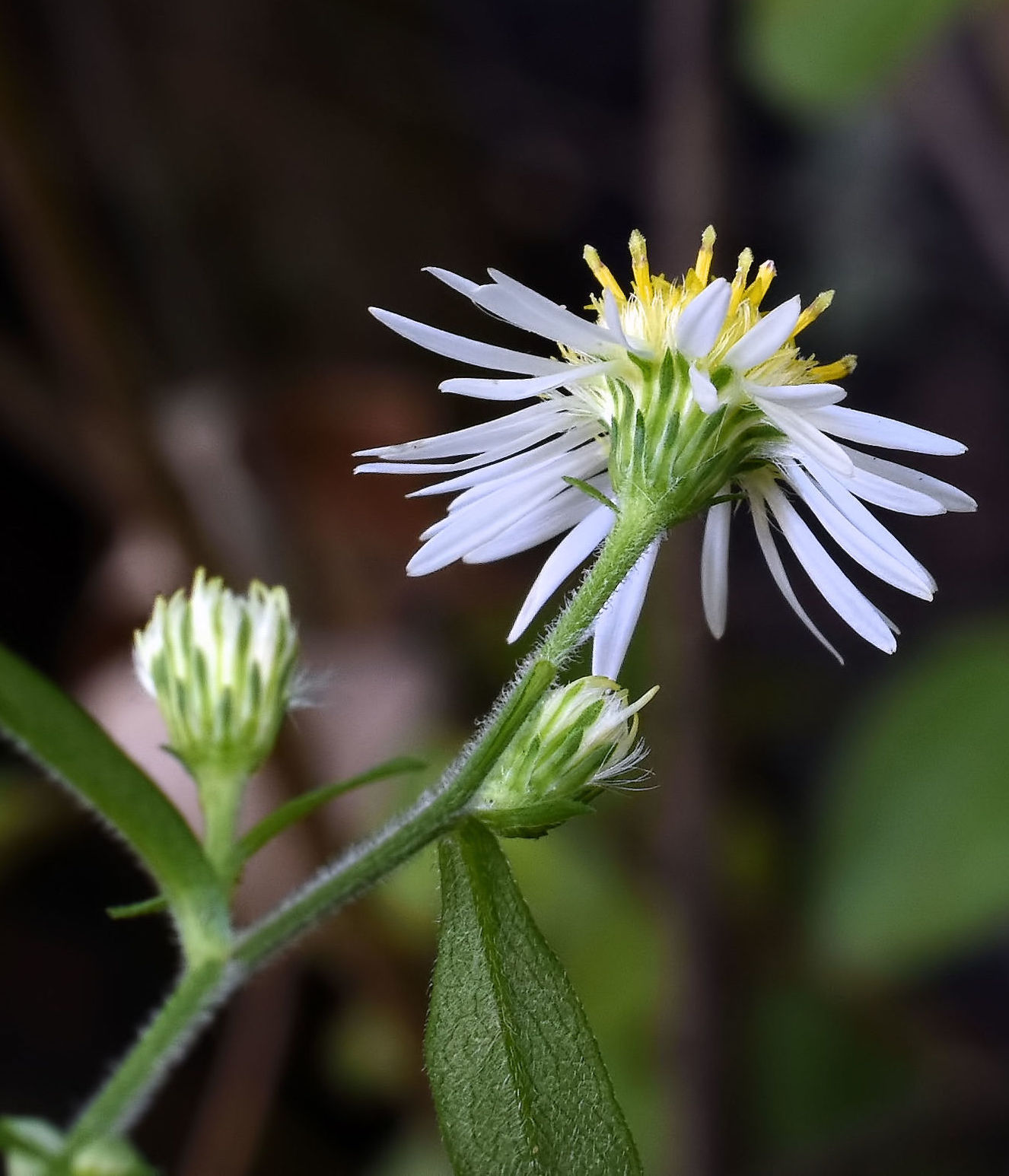
This image shows abaxial leaves, distal stems, bracts, involucres, and phyllaries on a S. ontarionis var. ontarionis plant.

The phyllaries are appressed or spreading. The shape of the outer phyllaries is linear-obovate, and the inner phyllary shape is oblong-lanceolate to linear. They are in 4–6 (sometimes 3) unequal rows, meaning they are staggered and do not end at the same point. The margins of each phyllary are translucent, ciliate, and uneven. The phyllaries have green chlorophyllous zones that are lanceolate, with acute to acuminate and mucronulate tips. Outer phyllaries are sparsely pilose except on S. o. var. glabratum, which are glabrous. Inner phyllaries are glabrous.

==== Florets ====
The 15–26 (Note: Outside range 10–26) ray florets are usually white, rarely pinkish or light purple to blue. They are 3.5–5.5 mm long, but can be as long as 8 mm, and are 0.5–1.5 mm wide.

The disk florets start out as cream or light yellow turning purple to brown when enlarged. (Note: All species in the Symphyotrichum genus have disk florets that mature or turn to a pink, purple, or light brown. This is not unique to this species.) Each has 5 lobes, (Note: There are 5 lobes on the disk florets of all species in Symphyotrichum genus.) and there are 12–25 florets within the disk. When the disk florets have opened, the lobes are spreading and lanceolate in shape.

=== Fruit ===
The fruits (seeds) of Symphyotrichum ontarionis are not true achenes. They are cypselae, resembling an achene but surrounded by a calyx sheath. They are gray or tan with an oblong obovoid shape and sometimes compressed. They are 1.2–2 mm long with 3–5 nerves, and are strigillose (with a few stiff, slender bristles) on their surface. They also have pappi (tufts of hairs) which are whitish to white and 3–3.5 mm long.

=== Chromosomes ===
Symphyotrichum ontarionis has a base number of x = 8 with tetraploid chromosome counts of 32 for both varieties.

== Taxonomy ==
Along with many other species, Symphyotrichum ontarionis was formerly included in the genus Aster. However, this broad circumscription of Aster is polyphyletic and the North American asters are classified in Symphyotrichum and several other genera. The genus Symphyotrichum is sometimes called American-asters. Symphyotrichum ontarionis was created (as Symphyotrichum ontarione) with American botanist Guy L. Nesom's evaluation of Aster sensu lato in 1995.

The basionym of Symphyotrichum ontarionis is Aster ontarionis Wiegand, and it has several taxonomic synonyms. Its name with author citations is Symphyotrichum ontarionis (Wiegand) G.L.Nesom. American botanist Karl McKay Wiegand, in 1928, formally described what we know today as Symphyotrichum ontarionis. Wiegand, written Wiegand, is the standard botanical author abbreviation for Karl McKay Wiegand. Likewise, G.L.Nesom is the abbreviation for Guy L. Nesom. Wiegand's abbreviation is placed in parentheses because his authorship was retained when Nesom cited Aster ontarionis Wiegand as the basionym at the time he renamed the species.

Symphyotrichum ontarionis is classified in the subgenus Symphyotrichum, section Symphyotrichum, subsection Dumosi. It is one of the "bushy asters and relatives". The species name ontarionis is a Latinization of Ontario for Lake Ontario, as Wiegand stated in his description that the species was "apparently limited to the upper St. Lawrence Valley not far from Lake Ontario."

Two varieties of Symphyotrichum ontarionis are recognized:

- S. ontarionis var. ontarionis, the autonym, has leaves hairy underneath. As the autonym variety, it was automatically created when the first variety was defined.
- S. ontarionis var. glabratum (Semple) Brouillet & Bouchard, the glabrate variety, has leaves hairless or nearly so underneath.

== Distribution and habitat ==
Symphyotrichum ontarionis occurs from Ontario and Quebec south to North Carolina and Texas. S. ontarionis var. ontarionis is found throughout most of this range, and is replaced by S. ontarionis var. glabratum in northern Ontario, Quebec, and Michigan. The species is typically found in shaded, moist soils that occur in moist forests and along stream banks.

== Conservation ==
NatureServe lists it as Secure (G5) worldwide; Imperiled (S2) in Kansas, Vermont, and West Virginia; and, Vulnerable (S3) in Georgia.
