= Amelanchier parviflora =

Scientific classification
- Kingdom: Plantae
- Clade: Tracheophytes
- Clade: Angiosperms
- Clade: Eudicots
- Clade: Rosids
- Order: Rosales
- Family: Rosaceae
- Genus: Amelanchier
- Species: A. parviflora

Binomial name
- Amelanchier parviflora Boiss.

Subspecies
- Amelanchier parviflora subsp. chelmea (Halácsy) Ziel.; Amelanchier parviflora subsp. dentata (Browicz) K.I.Chr.; Amelanchier parviflora var. libanotica (Browicz) Fridl.; Amelanchier parviflora subsp. parviflora

Species of flowering plant

Amelanchier parviflora is a species of plant in the family Rosaceae. It is a deciduous shrub native to the Eastern Mediterranean.

== Description ==
Amelanchier parviflora grows between 0.8 and 2 m (2.6 and 6.6 ft) tall. The twigs are white-villous.

The leaves are obovate or orbicular, with the top being smooth and green and the underside white-tomentose.

The fruit is a nearly spherical pome and a dark purple color when ripe. It is also an enzyme inhibitor, specifically showing anti-tyrosinase and anti-acetylcholinesterase activity.

== Distribution and habitat ==
Amelanchier parviflora grows in the subtropics (specifically in limestone slopes, forest edges, and maquis shrublands) at elevations between 600 and 1,800 m (2,000 and 5,900 ft) above sea level. It prefers calcareous soils and full sun or light shade.

Its subspecies have smaller ranges. A. parviflora subsp. chelmea is limited to the East-Aegean Greek islands, var. libanotica to Lebanon and Syria, and subsp. dentata and subsp. parviflora both to Turkey.

== Medicinal uses ==
Amelanchier parviflora subsp. dentata's branches are traditionally used to treat urinary tract infection. The fruit of A. parviflora subsp. parviflora is traditionally used to treat stomach pain while the leaves are used to manage cardiovascular disease.
