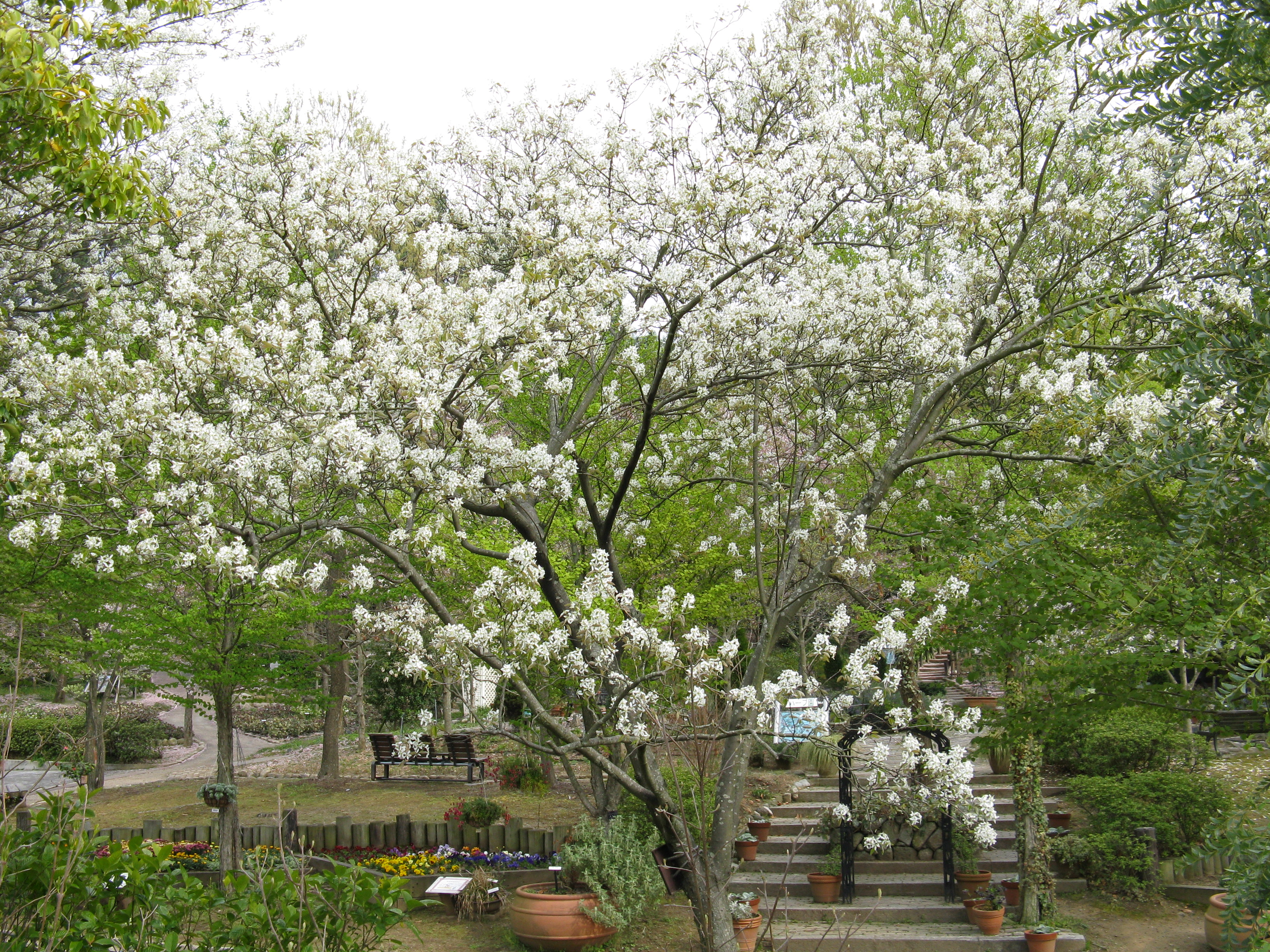

Scientific classification
- Kingdom: Plantae
- Clade: Tracheophytes
- Clade: Angiosperms
- Clade: Eudicots
- Clade: Rosids
- Order: Rosales
- Family: Rosaceae
- Genus: Amelanchier
- Species: A. asiatica

Binomial name
- Amelanchier asiatica Endl.

Synonyms
- Amelanchier canadensis Medikus var. asiatica (Siebold & Zuccarini) Koidzumi; Pyrus taquetii H. Léveillé; Pyrus vaniotii H. Léveillé

= Amelanchier asiatica =

Species of flowering plant

Amelanchier asiatica, commonly known as Korean juneberry or Asian serviceberry, is a species in the genus Amelanchier, native to China, Japan, and Korea. It is a shrub or small tree, growing to about 12 metres (39 ft) tall.

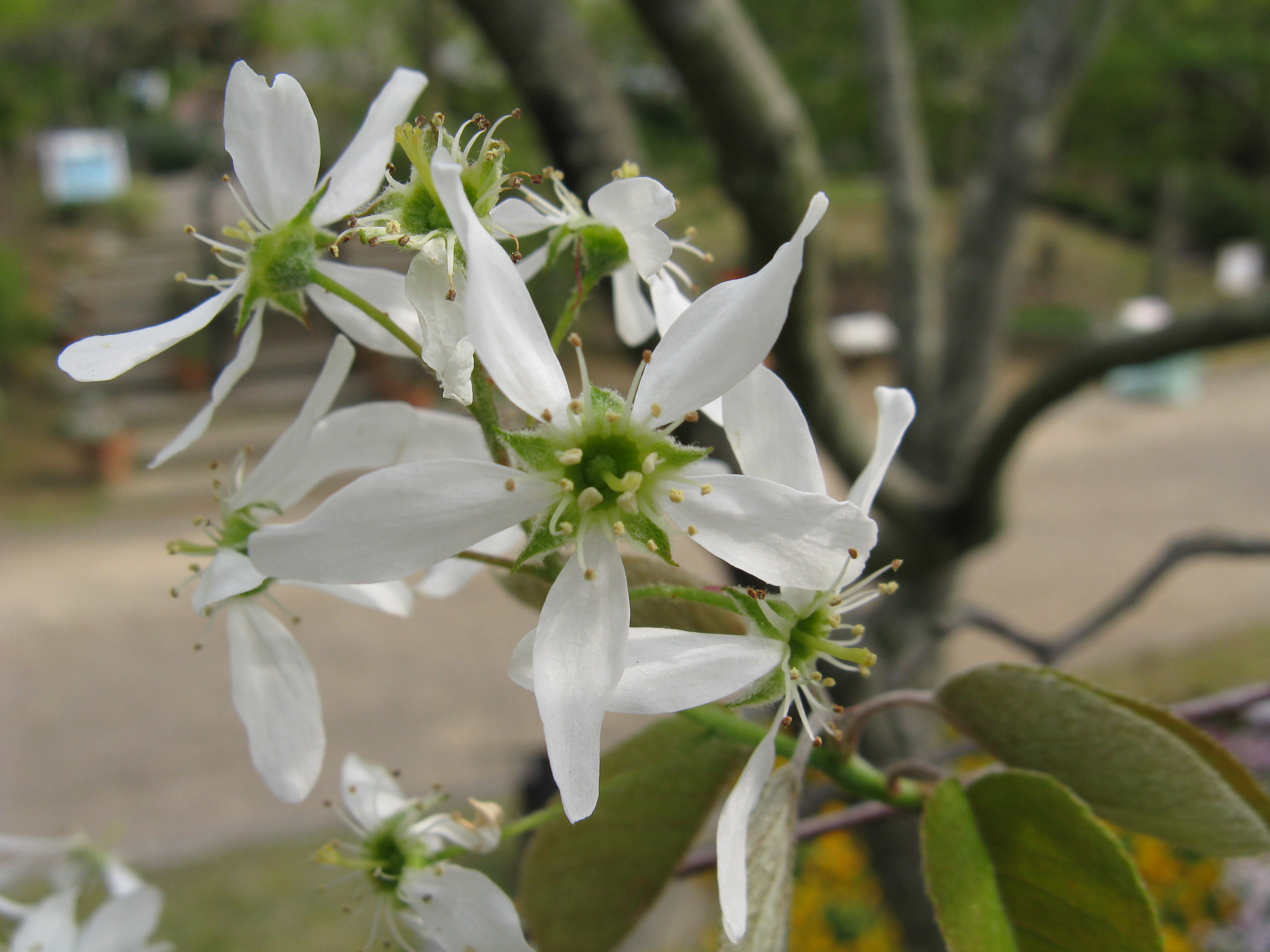
Flowers

Berries

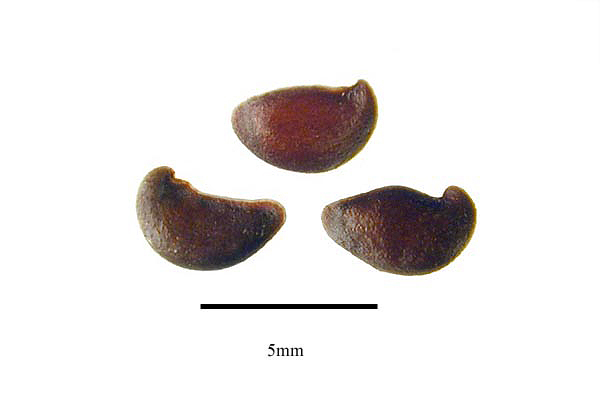
Seeds
