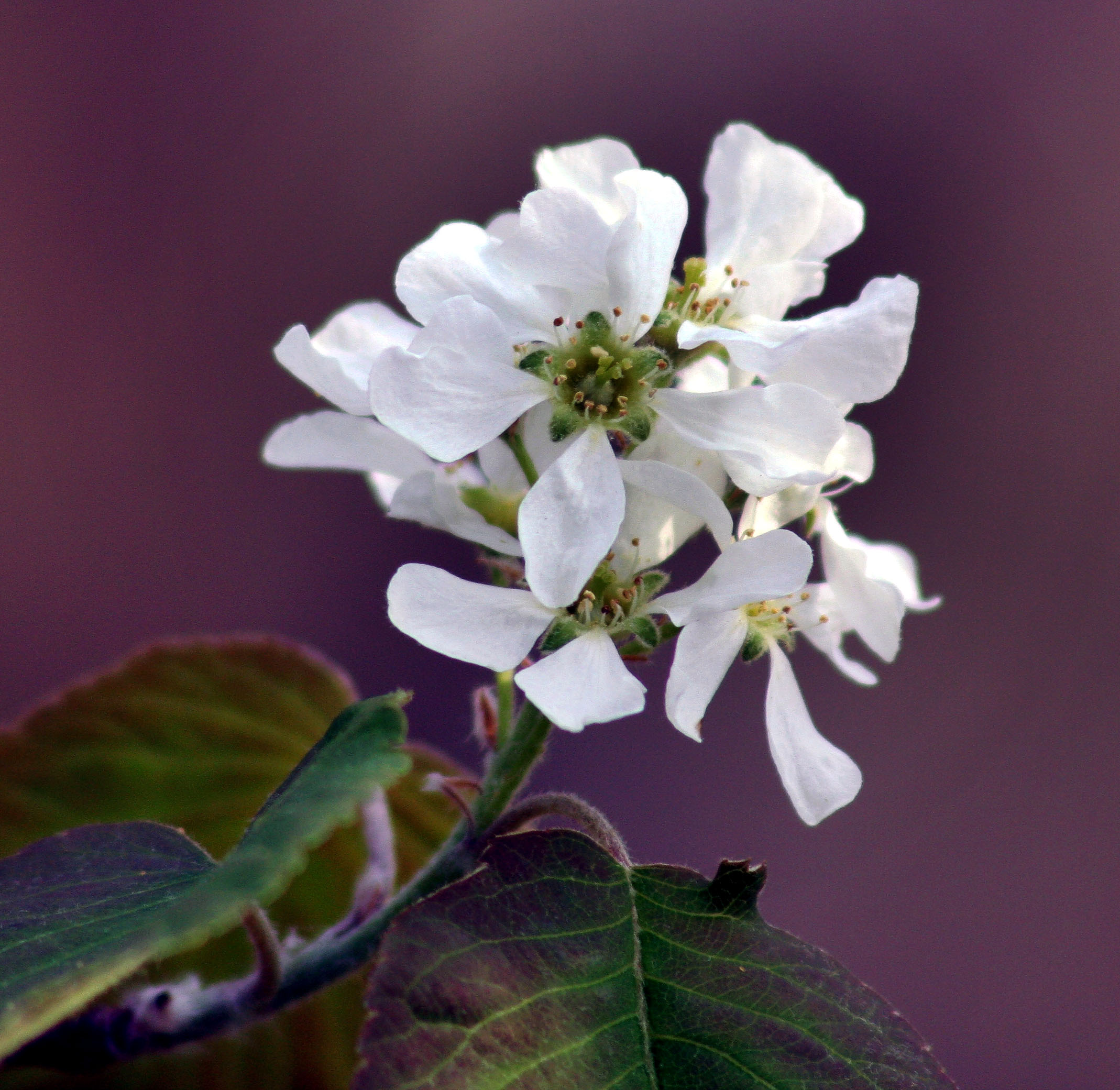

Conservation status
- Secure (NatureServe)

Scientific classification
- Kingdom: Plantae
- Clade: Tracheophytes
- Clade: Angiosperms
- Clade: Eudicots
- Clade: Rosids
- Order: Rosales
- Family: Rosaceae
- Genus: Amelanchier
- Species: A. × spicata

Binomial name
- Amelanchier × spicata (Lam.) K.Koch

Synonyms
- A. stolonifera Wiegand; A. oblongifolia B.L.Rob. & Fernald

= Amelanchier × spicata =

Species of flowering plant

Amelanchier × spicata, also referred to as the low juneberry, thicket shadbush, dwarf serviceberry, or low serviceberry (historically also called "pigeon berry"), is a hybrid of Amelanchier alnifolia × Amelanchier humilis. that has edible fruit, which are really pomes. They can be eaten raw or cooked. Amelanchier × spicata has clusters of small white flowers that bloom in spring.

Amelanchier × spicata is native to North America. It is a very hardy species, and is considered invasive in Scandinavia.
