= Amelanchier pallida =

Conservation status
- Secure (NatureServe)

Scientific classification
- Kingdom: Plantae
- Clade: Tracheophytes
- Clade: Angiosperms
- Clade: Eudicots
- Clade: Rosids
- Order: Rosales
- Family: Rosaceae
- Genus: Amelanchier
- Species: A. pallida

Binomial name
- Amelanchier pallida Greene

Synonyms
- List: Amelanchier alnifolia var. pallida (Greene) Jeps.; Amelanchier alnifolia subsp. pallida (Greene) A.E.Murray; Amelanchier gracilis A.Heller

Species of flowering plant

Amelanchier pallida, the pale serviceberry or western serviceberry, is a species of Amelanchier native to the US states of California and Arizona. They are shrubs or small trees reaching 10 ft (3 m), with attractive blue-green foliage. They typically grow in mountains up to 11,000 ft (3,400 m) above sea level, generally alongside streams. Native Americans used to dry the berries for winter provisions, and they can be made into a jam.
