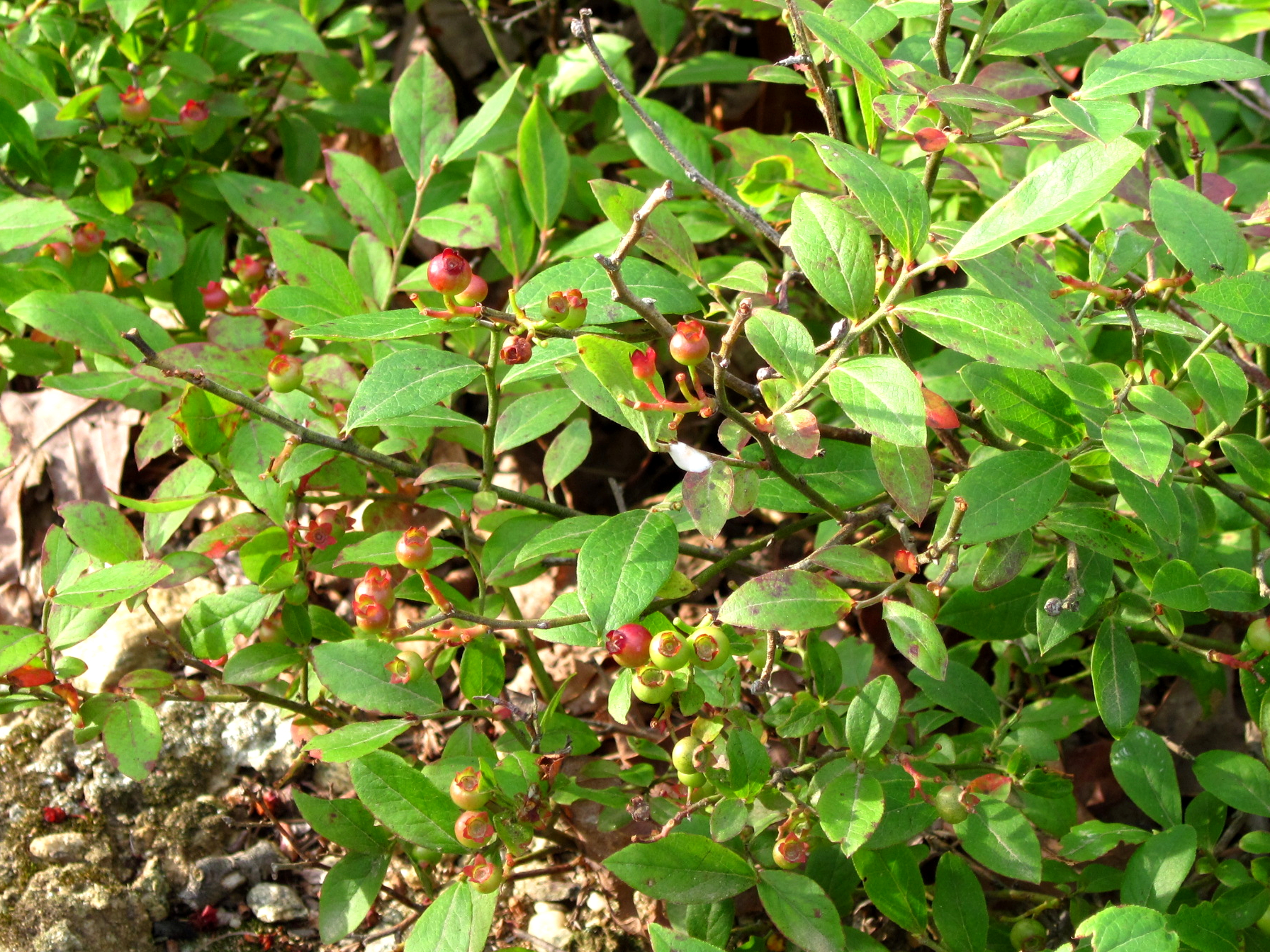
- Unripe fruits and foliage of Amelanchier humilis

Conservation status
- Secure (NatureServe)

Scientific classification
- Kingdom: Plantae
- Clade: Tracheophytes
- Clade: Angiosperms
- Clade: Eudicots
- Clade: Rosids
- Order: Rosales
- Family: Rosaceae
- Genus: Amelanchier
- Species: A. humilis

Binomial name
- Amelanchier humilis Wiegand

Synonyms
- Amelanchier alnifolia var. compacta (E.L.Nielsen) McKay; Amelanchier humilis var. campestris E.L.Nielsen; Amelanchier humilis var. compacta E.L.Nielsen; Amelanchier humilis var. exserrata E.L.Nielsen; Amelanchier humilis var. typica E.L.Nielsen; Amelanchier mucronata E.L.Nielsen

= Amelanchier humilis =

Species of flowering plant

Amelanchier humilis, commonly known as the low shadbush, is a North American species of serviceberry. It is native to central Canada (from Saskatchewan to Québec) and the northeastern and north-central United States (from Nebraska and the Dakotas east as far as Vermont and New Jersey).

== Description ==
Amelanchier humilis is a shrub up to 120 cm (4 feet) tall. The fruit, which is a pome, is very dark, almost black. It is edible and can be eaten raw or cooked. The fruit has a sweet taste, with slight apple flavor. The leaves are egg-shaped, up to 5 cm (2 inches) long.
