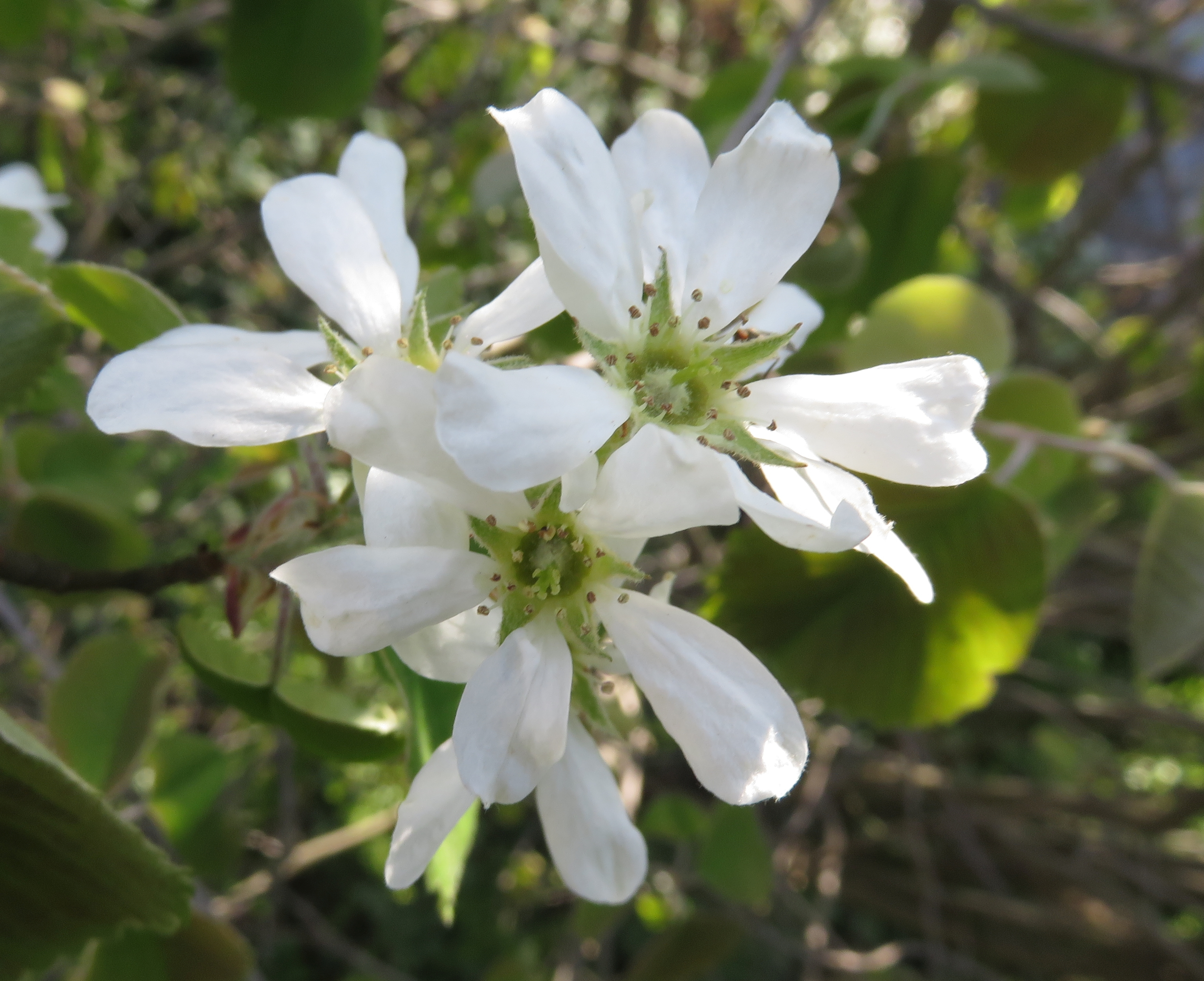

Conservation status
- Least Concern (IUCN 3.1)

Scientific classification
- Kingdom: Plantae
- Clade: Tracheophytes
- Clade: Angiosperms
- Clade: Eudicots
- Clade: Rosids
- Order: Rosales
- Family: Rosaceae
- Genus: Amelanchier
- Species: A. interior

Binomial name
- Amelanchier interior E.L.Nielsen
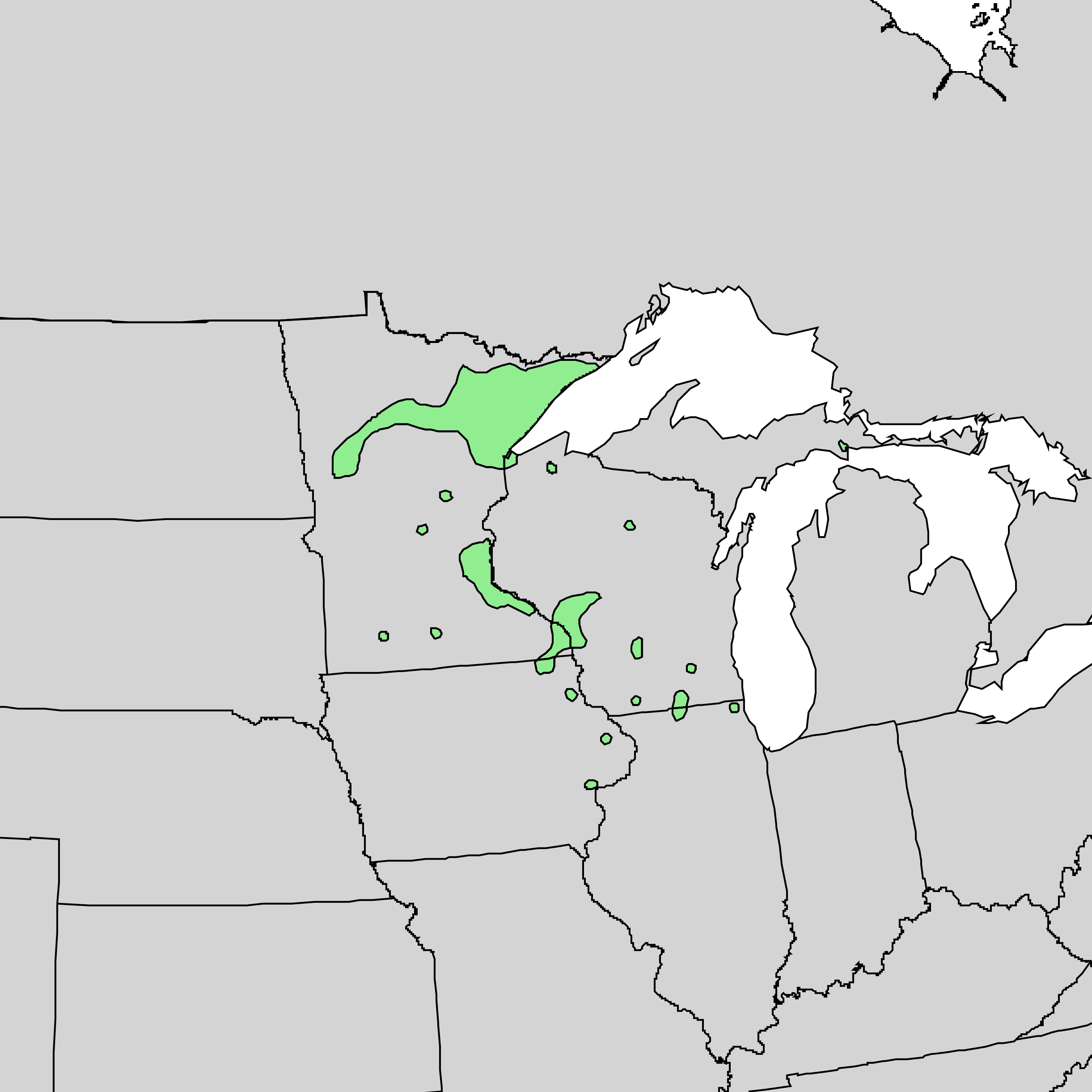
- Natural range of Amelanchier interior

= Amelanchier interior =

Serviceberry shrub

Amelanchier interior or Wiegand's shadbush is type of serviceberry shrub. It produces a sweet tasting edible fruit called a pome, which can be eaten raw or cooked. The fruit has a sweet flavor. This species is a deciduous tree. It grows on hillsides and banks of streams and reaches up to nine meters. The plant prefers light (sandy), medium (loamy) and heavy (clay) soils and can grow in heavy clay soil. It can grow in acid, neutral and alkaline soils, as well as shade or semi-shade. It requires moist soil.
