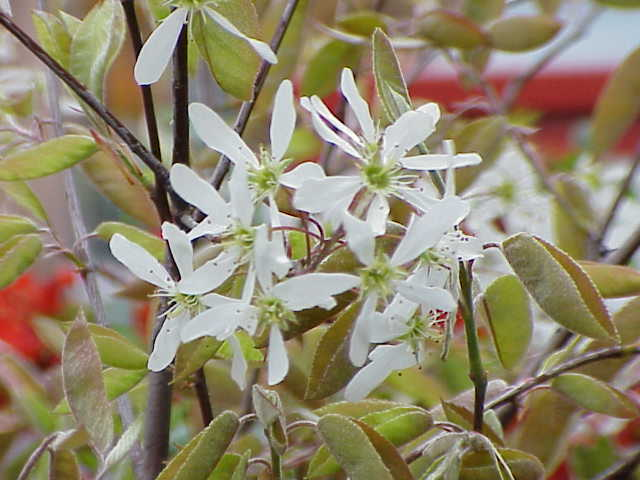

Scientific classification
- Kingdom: Plantae
- Clade: Tracheophytes
- Clade: Angiosperms
- Clade: Eudicots
- Clade: Rosids
- Order: Rosales
- Family: Rosaceae
- Subfamily: Amygdaloideae
- Tribe: Maleae
- Subtribe: Malinae
- Genus: Amelanchier; Medik.

= Amelanchier =

Service berry

Amelanchier (/æməˈlænʃɪər/ am-ə-LAN-sheer), also known as shadbush, shadwood or shadblow, serviceberry or sarvisberry (or just sarvis), juneberry, saskatoon, sugarplum, wild-plum or chuckley pear, is a genus of about 20 species of deciduous-leaved shrubs and small trees in the rose family (Rosaceae) that produce a pome fruit.

At least one species is native to every Canadian province and territory as well as every U.S. state except Hawaii. Two species occur in Europe and four in Asia. There are a number of cultivars.

The berries are commonly consumed by wildlife. They are both edible raw to humans and used to make baked goods. The Canadian city of Saskatoon, Saskatchewan, is named after a Cree term for the berry.

== Description ==
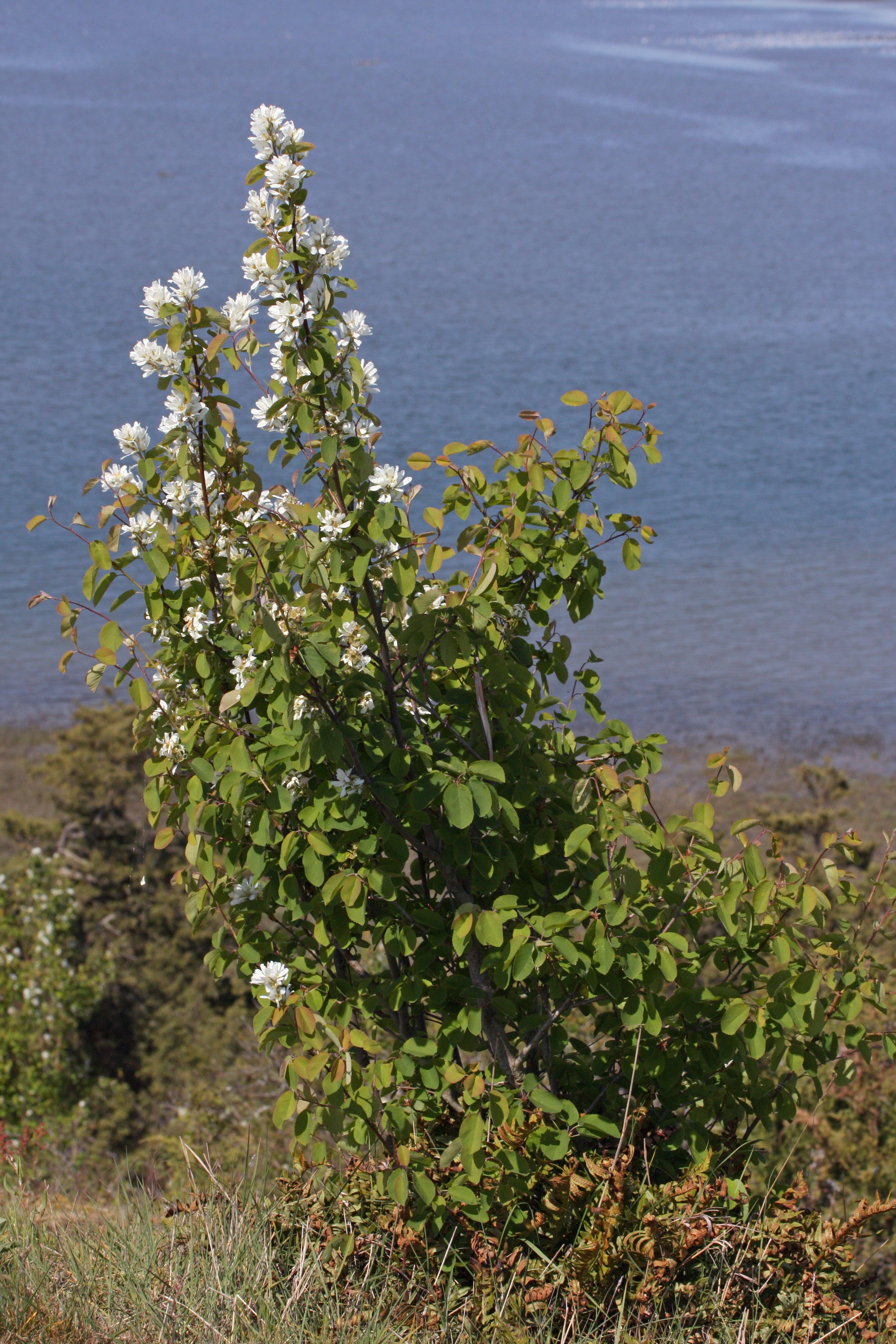
Amelanchier alnifolia

The various species of Amelanchier grow to 0.2–20 metres (1/2–65 1/2 feet) tall; some are small trees, some are multistemmed, clump-forming shrubs, and yet others form extensive low shrubby patches (clones). The bark is gray or less often brown, and in tree species smooth or fissuring when older. The leaves are deciduous, cauline, alternate, simple, lanceolate to elliptic to orbiculate, 0.5–10 by 0.5–5.5 centimetres (1/4–4 by 1/4–2 1/4 inches), thin to coriaceous, with surfaces above glabrous or densely tomentose at flowering, and glabrous or more or less hairy beneath at maturity.

The inflorescences are terminal, with 1–20 flowers, erect or drooping, either in clusters of one to four flowers, or in racemes with 4–20 flowers. The flowers have five white (rarely somewhat pink, yellow, or streaked with red), linear to orbiculate petals, 2.6–25 millimetres (1/8–1 in) long, with the petals in one species (A. nantucketensis) often andropetalous (bearing apical microsporangia adaxially). The flowers bloom in late spring. The fruit is a berrylike pome, red to purple to nearly black at maturity, 5–15 mm (1/4–5/8 in) in diameter, insipid to delectably sweet, maturing in summer.

Saskatoons can live up to 50 years.

== Taxonomy ==
The taxonomic classification of shadbushes has long perplexed botanists, horticulturalists, and others, as suggested by the range in number of species recognized in the genus, from 6 to 33, in two recent publications. A major source of complexity comes from the occurrence of hybridization, polyploidy, and apomixis (asexual seed production), making species difficult to characterize and identify.

=== Species ===
There are around 24 species accepted by the Plants of the World Online as of April 2023.

Image	Scientific name	Common name	Distribution
	Amelanchier alnifolia (Nutt.) Nutt. ex M.Roem.	Saskatoon serviceberry, alder-leaved shadbush, saskatoon, saskatoon berry	Alaska across most of western Canada and in the western and north-central United States
	Amelanchier amabilis Wiegand		E. Canada to NE U.S.
	Amelanchier arborea (F.Michx.) Fernald	downy serviceberry	Gulf Coast north to Thunder Bay in Ontario and Lake St. John in Quebec, and west to Texas and Minnesota
	Amelanchier asiatica (Siebold & Zucc.) Endl. ex Walp.	Korean juneberry or Asian serviceberry	China, Japan, and Korea
	Amelanchier bartramiana (Tausch) M.Roem.	mountain shadbush	E. Canada to NE U.S.
	Amelanchier canadensis (L.) Medik.	Canada serviceberry, shadblow serviceberry, bilberry, eastern shadbush, Indian pear	Canada from Newfoundland west to southern Ontario, and in the United States from Maine south to Alabama.
	Amelanchier cretica (Willd.) DC.		South eastern Europe
	Amelanchier cusickii Fernald		West Canada to West U.S.
	Amelanchier fernaldii Wiegand		Eastern Canada.
	Amelanchier gaspensis (Wiegand) Fernald & Weatherby		Quebec (Gaspé Peninsula)
	Amelanchier humilis Wiegand	low shadbush	Canada (from Saskatchewan to Québec) and the northeastern and north-central United States (from Nebraska and the Dakotas east as far as Vermont and New Jersey).
	Amelanchier interior E.L.Nielsen	Wiegand's shadbush	E. Canada to N. Central & NE U.S.
	Amelanchier intermedia Spach		E. Canada to N. Central & NE U.S.
	Amelanchier laevis Wiegand	smooth shadbush, smooth serviceberry, Allegheny serviceberry	Eastern Canada and the eastern United States, from Newfoundland west to Ontario, Minnesota, and Iowa, south as far as Georgia and Alabama.
	Amelanchier nantucketensis E.P.Bicknell	Nantucket serviceberry	New York, Maryland, Massachusetts, Virginia, Maine, and Nova Scotia.
	Amelanchier obovalis (Michx.) Ashe	Southern Juneberry, Coastal serviceberry	United States (from New Jersey to Georgia)
	Amelanchier ovalis Medik.	snowy mespilus	southern Europe, as well as North Africa and the Middle East.
	Amelanchier pallida Greene	pale serviceberry or western serviceberry	United States (California and Arizona)
	Amelanchier parviflora Boiss.		Turkey
	Amelanchier sanguinea (Pursh) DC.	red-twigged shadbush or roundleaf serviceberry	New Brunswick to Saskatchewan, Canada to northeastern United States, and the Great Lakes region and south as far as northern Georgia
	Amelanchier sinica (C.K.Schneid.) Chun	Chinese serviceberry	Central & South China
	Amelanchier stolonifera Wiegand	running serviceberry	E. Canada to N. Central & NE U.S.
	Amelanchier turkestanica Litv.		Kazakhstan (Bayanaul Hills)
	Amelanchier utahensis Koehne	Utah serviceberry	Western North America

==== Natural hybrids ====
- Amelanchier × lamarckii F.G.Schroed. ( A. arborea × A. laevis.)– Juneberry
- Amelanchier × neglecta Eggl. ex K.R.Cushman, M.B.Burgess, E.T.Doucette & C.S.Campb. (A. bartramiana × A. laevis.)
- Amelanchier × quinti-martii Louis-Marie (A. arborea × A. bartramiana. )
- Amelanchier × spicata (Lam.) K.Koch (A. alnifolia × A. humilis.) - low juneberry

==== Garden hybrids ====
Since classifications have varied greatly over the past century, species names are often used interchangeably in the nursery trade. Several natural or horticultural hybrids also exist, and many A. arborea and A. canadensis plants that are offered for sale are actually hybrids, or entirely different species. A. × grandiflora is another hybrid of garden origin, between A. arborea and A. laevis. The cultivar 'La Paloma' has gained the Royal Horticultural Society's Award of Garden Merit.

A taxon called Amelanchier lamarckii (or A. x lamarckii) is very widely cultivated and naturalized in Europe, where it was introduced in the 17th century. It is apomictic, breeding true from seed, and probably of hybrid origin, perhaps descending from a cross between A. laevis and either A. arborea or A. canadensis. While A. lamarckii is known to be of North American origin, probably from eastern Canada, it is not known to occur naturally in the wild in North America.

=== Etymology ===
The generic name Amelanchier is a transcription of the French word amélanchier, borrowed from amalenquièr, amelanchièr, the Provençal names of the European Amelanchier ovalis.

The French name for the fruit, amélanche, is borrowed from the Occitan noun amelenco, itself form a Gaulish noun *aballinca (from Gaulish aballo « apple » and the suffix -inca), with phonetic attraction to the Latin malum « apple ». The suffix may derive from the Latin -inqua or its Ligurian equivalent -inca.

The name serviceberry comes from the similarity of the fruit to the related European Sorbus. Juneberry refers to the fruits of certain species becoming ripe in June. The name saskatoon originated from a Cree noun misâskwatômina (misāskwatōmina, misaaskwatoomina) for Amelanchier alnifolia.

Shadberry refers to the shad runs in certain New England streams, which took place around June, when the trees fruit.

== Distribution and habitat ==
Amelanchier is native to temperate regions of the Northern Hemisphere, growing primarily in early successional habitats. It is most diverse taxonomically in North America, especially in southeastern Canada and the northeastern United States.

The plants are hardy down to −60 °C (−76 °F).

== Ecology ==
Amelanchier plants are preferred browse for deer and rabbits, and heavy browsing pressure can suppress natural regeneration. Caterpillars of such Lepidoptera as the brimstone moth, brown-tail, grey dagger, mottled umber, rough prominent, satellite, winter moth, red-spotted purple and white admiral (both Limenitis arthemis), as well as various other herbivorous insects feed on Amelanchier. Many insects and diseases that attack orchard trees also affect this genus, in particular trunk borers and Gymnosporangium rust. In years when late flowers of Amelanchier overlap those of wild roses and brambles, bees may spread bacterial fireblight.

== Cultivation ==
Selections from A. alnifolia have been chosen for fruit production, with several named cultivars. Other cultivars appear to be derived from hybridization between A. alnifolia and A. stolonifera. Propagation is by seed, divisions, and grafting. Serviceberries graft so readily that grafts onto other genera, such as Crataegus and Sorbus, are often successful.

Several species are very popular ornamental shrubs, grown for their flowers, bark, and fall color. All need similar conditions to grow well, requiring good drainage, air circulation (to discourage leaf diseases), watering during drought, and soil appropriate for the species.

== Uses ==
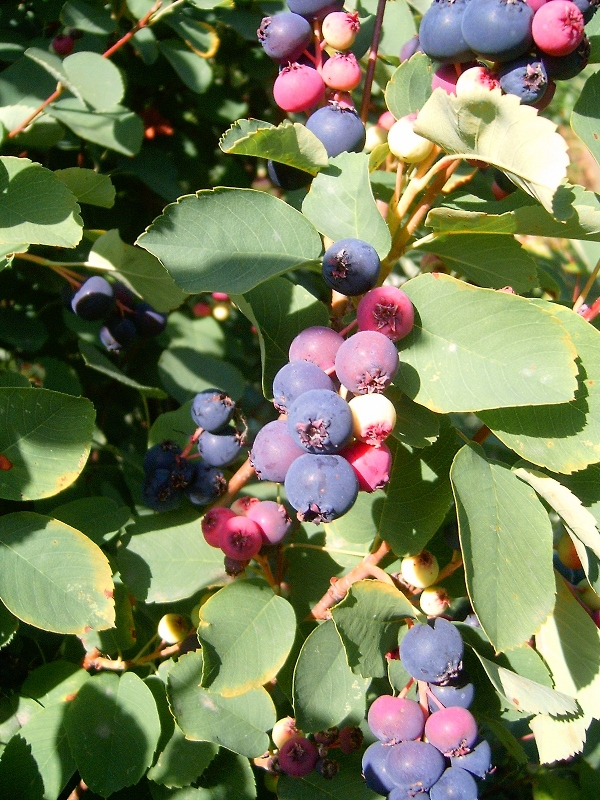
Fruit and leaves of Amelanchier ovalis

The fruit of several species is safe to eat raw, possessing a mild sweetness strongly accented by the almond-like flavour of the seeds. The fruit was harvested for food by the Aboriginal people and early settlers of western Canada.

The fruit can be harvested for pies, muffins, jams, and wine. The saskatoon berry is harvested commercially. One version of the Native American food pemmican was flavored by serviceberry fruits in combination with minced dried meat and fat.

The wood is brown, hard, close-grained, and heavy. The heartwood is reddish-brown, and the sapwood is lighter in color. It can be used for tool handles and fishing rods. Native Americans used it for arrow shafts. Members of the Pit River Tribe would use the wood to create a sort of body armor, crafting it into a heavy robe or overcoat and corset armor worn during fighting.

== In culture ==
George Washington planted specimens of Amelanchier on the grounds of his estate, Mount Vernon, in Virginia.

The Canadian city of Saskatoon, Saskatchewan, is named after this plant.

Indigenous scientist and author Robin Wall Kimmerer’s nonfiction book “The Serviceberry: Abundance and Reciprocity in the Natural World” celebrates the serviceberry tree as a symbol of the gift economy and gratitude in a modern economy lacking in these values.
