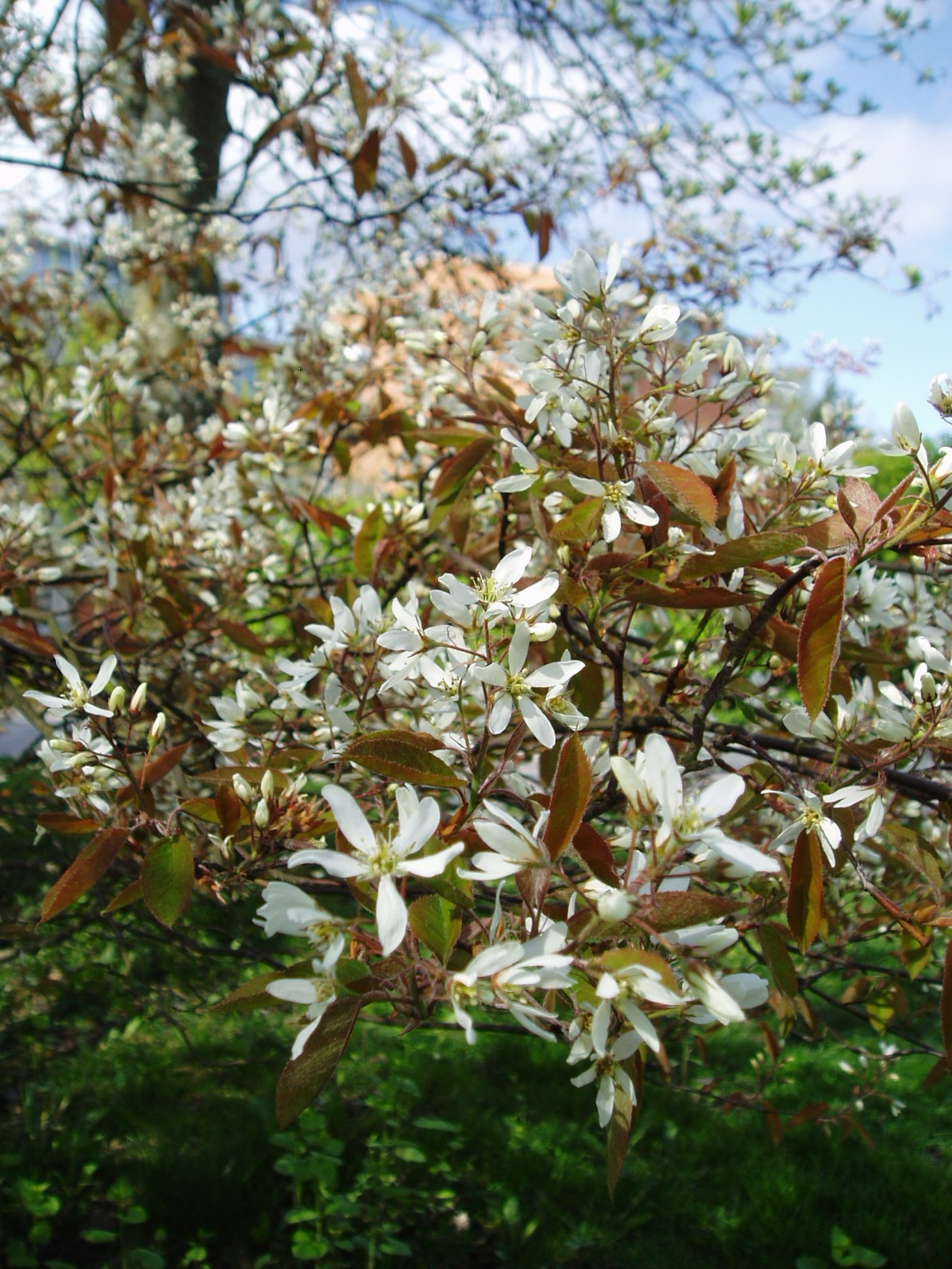

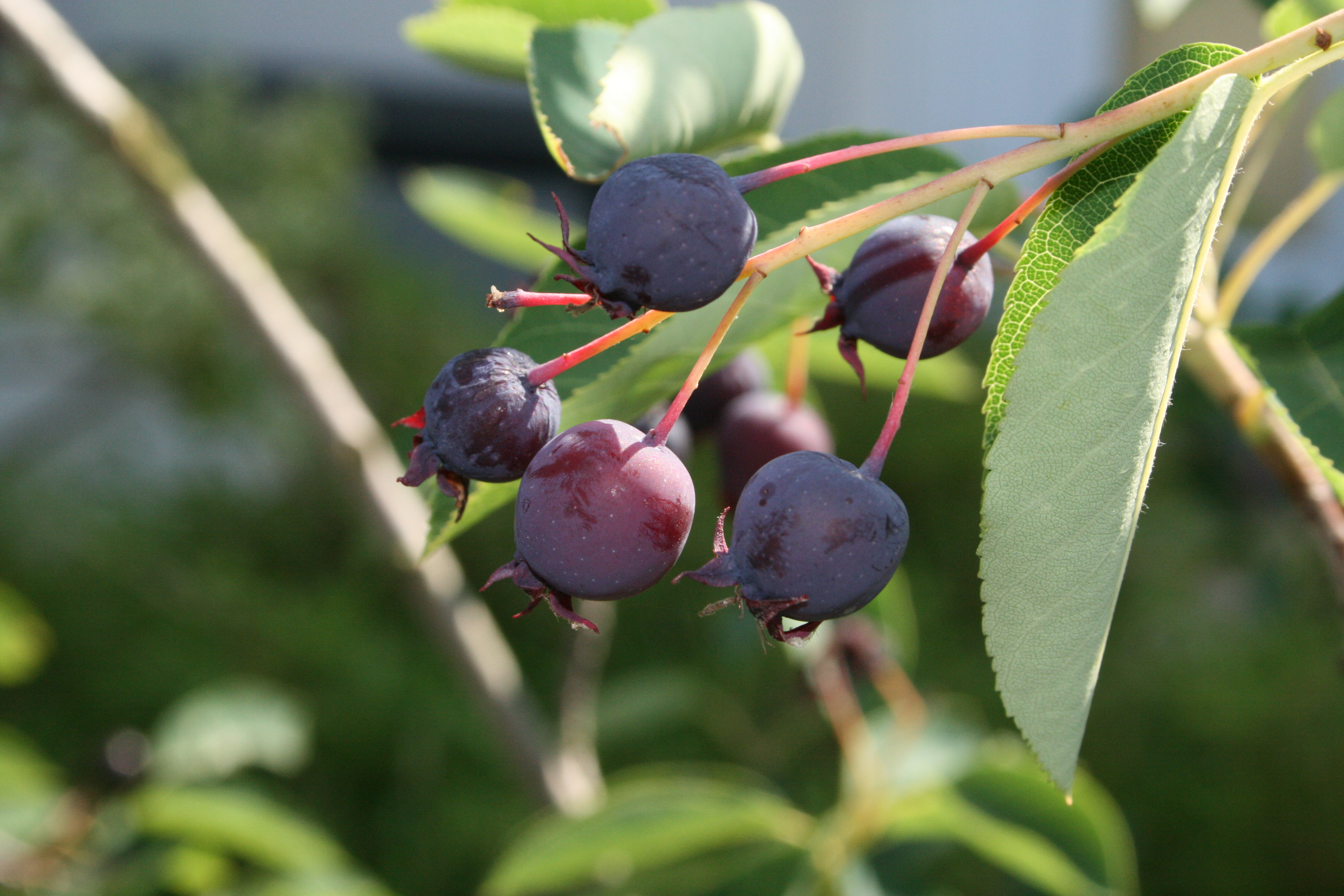

Scientific classification
- Kingdom: Plantae
- Clade: Tracheophytes
- Clade: Angiosperms
- Clade: Eudicots
- Clade: Rosids
- Order: Rosales
- Family: Rosaceae
- Genus: Amelanchier
- Species: A. × lamarckii

Binomial name
- Amelanchier × lamarckii F.G.Schroed.

= Amelanchier × lamarckii =

Species of flowering plant

Amelanchier × lamarckii, also called juneberry, serviceberry or shadbush, is a large deciduous flowering shrub or small tree in the family Rosaceae.

== Description ==
In spring the plant unfurls new leaves and produces star-shaped white flowers. The leaves are pink when they first open, maturing to yellow-green, and turn red in autumn. The plant's young berry-like pome fruits are dark red when young, but become dark purple when ripe.

== Taxonomy ==
This form is a natural hybrid of Amelanchier arborea (or A. canadensis) and A. laevis. Under the rules of botanical nomenclature, it is known as Amelanchier × lamarckii. The Latin specific epithet honors the French naturalist Jean-Baptiste Lamarck (1744–1829).

The European common name snowy mespilus (a name which is also attached to the related A. ovalis) reflects its close relationship with the medlar genus, Mespilus. It is also known as snowy mespil.

== Distribution and habitat ==
The plants are originally from eastern Canada and widely naturalised in Europe. There has been some escape within North America of plants apparently secondarily derived from those European forms.

== Ecology ==
The fruit is eaten by birds soon after it ripens.

== Cultivation ==
The species is widely cultivated as an ornamental plant. It has gained the Royal Horticultural Society's Award of Garden Merit.

== Uses ==
Like other species of Amelanchier, the fruits are edible with a sweet flavor.
