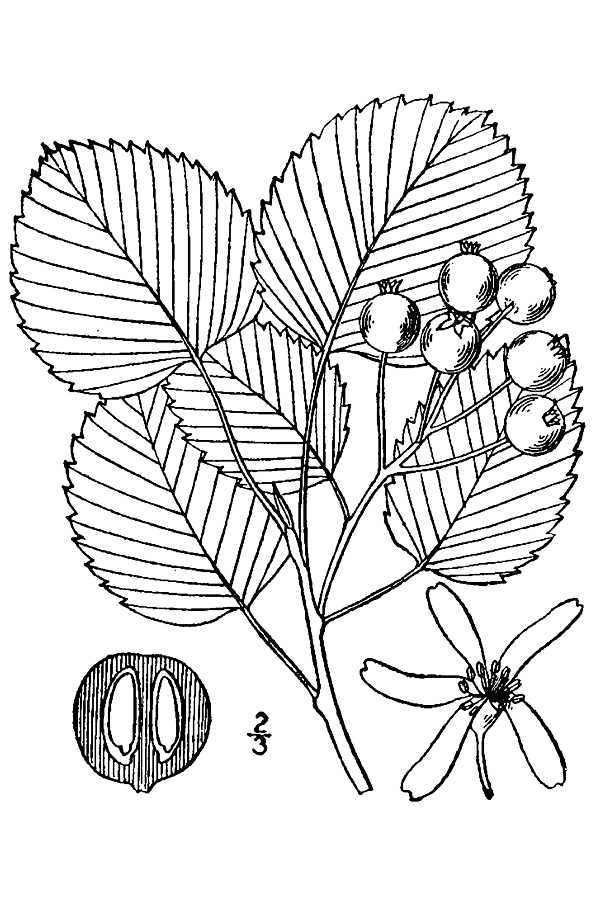
- 1913 drawing

Conservation status
- Secure (NatureServe)

Scientific classification
- Kingdom: Plantae
- Clade: Embryophytes
- Clade: Tracheophytes
- Clade: Angiosperms
- Clade: Eudicots
- Clade: Rosids
- Order: Rosales
- Family: Rosaceae
- Genus: Amelanchier
- Species: A. sanguinea

Binomial name
- Amelanchier sanguinea (Pursh) DC.
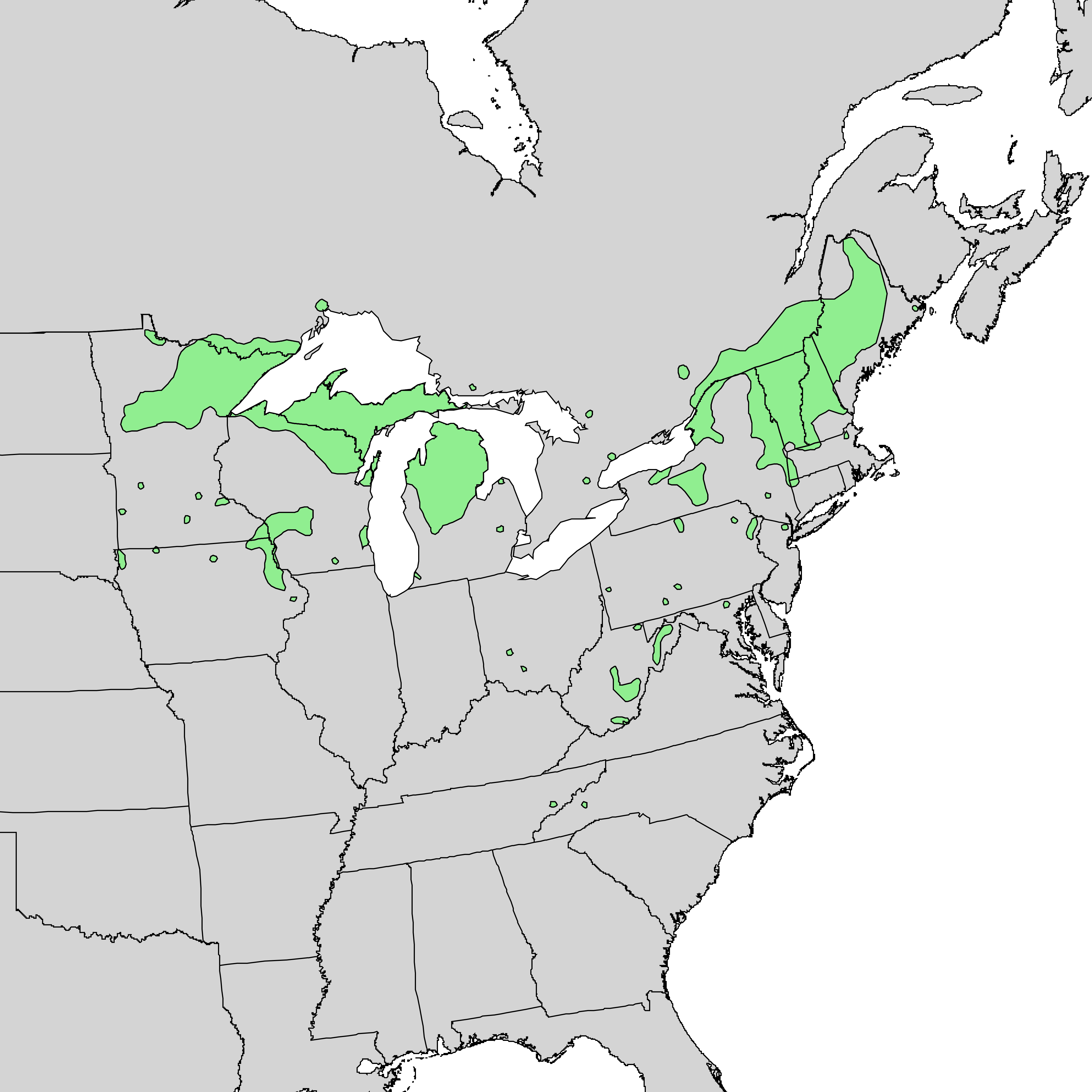
- Natural range of Amelanchier sanguinea

Synonyms
- Synonymy: Amelanchier amabilis Wiegand; Amelanchier canadensis var. rotundifolia (Michx.) Torr. & A.Gray; Amelanchier canadensis var. spicata (Lam.) Sarg.; Amelanchier huronensis Wiegand; Amelanchier rotundifolia (Michx.) M.Roem.; Amelanchier spicata (Lam.) Koehne; Aronia sanguinea (Pursh) Nutt.; Mespilus canadensis var. 'rotundifolia' Michx.; Pyrus sanguinea Pursh; Amelanchier gaspensis (Wiegand) Fernald & Weatherby, syn of var. gaspensis; Amelanchier grandiflora (Wiegand) Wiegand, syn of var. grandiflora; Amelanchier sanguinea f. grandiflora Wiegand, syn of var. grandiflora

= Amelanchier sanguinea =

Species of tree

Amelanchier sanguinea, known as red-twigged shadbush or roundleaf serviceberry, is a shrub native to eastern and central North America. Its native range stretches from New Brunswick to Saskatchewan south as far as northern Georgia. It is most common in eastern Canada, the northeastern United States, and the Great Lakes region.

Amelanchier sanguinea is a shrub that can grow up to 3 metres (9.8 ft) tall, and has edible sweet-flavored fruits that are red when young and become purple or dark-blue when they ripen. Like all Amelanchier fruit, these resemble berries, but are technically pomes.

Varieties

- Amelanchier sanguinea var. gaspensis Wiegand
- Amelanchier sanguinea var. grandiflora (Wiegand) Rehder
- Amelanchier sanguinea var. sanguinea
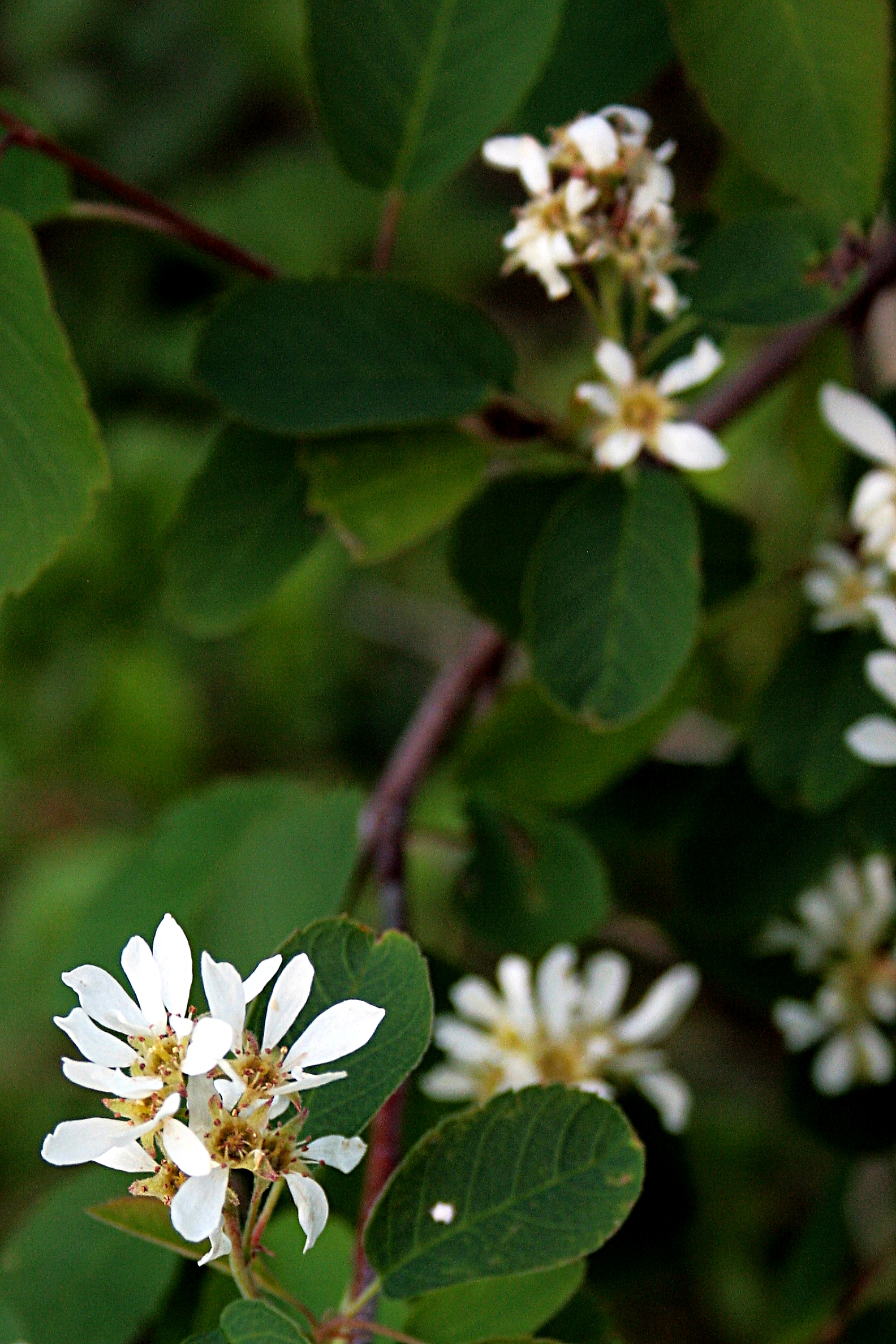
Akureyri Botanical Gardens, Iceland
