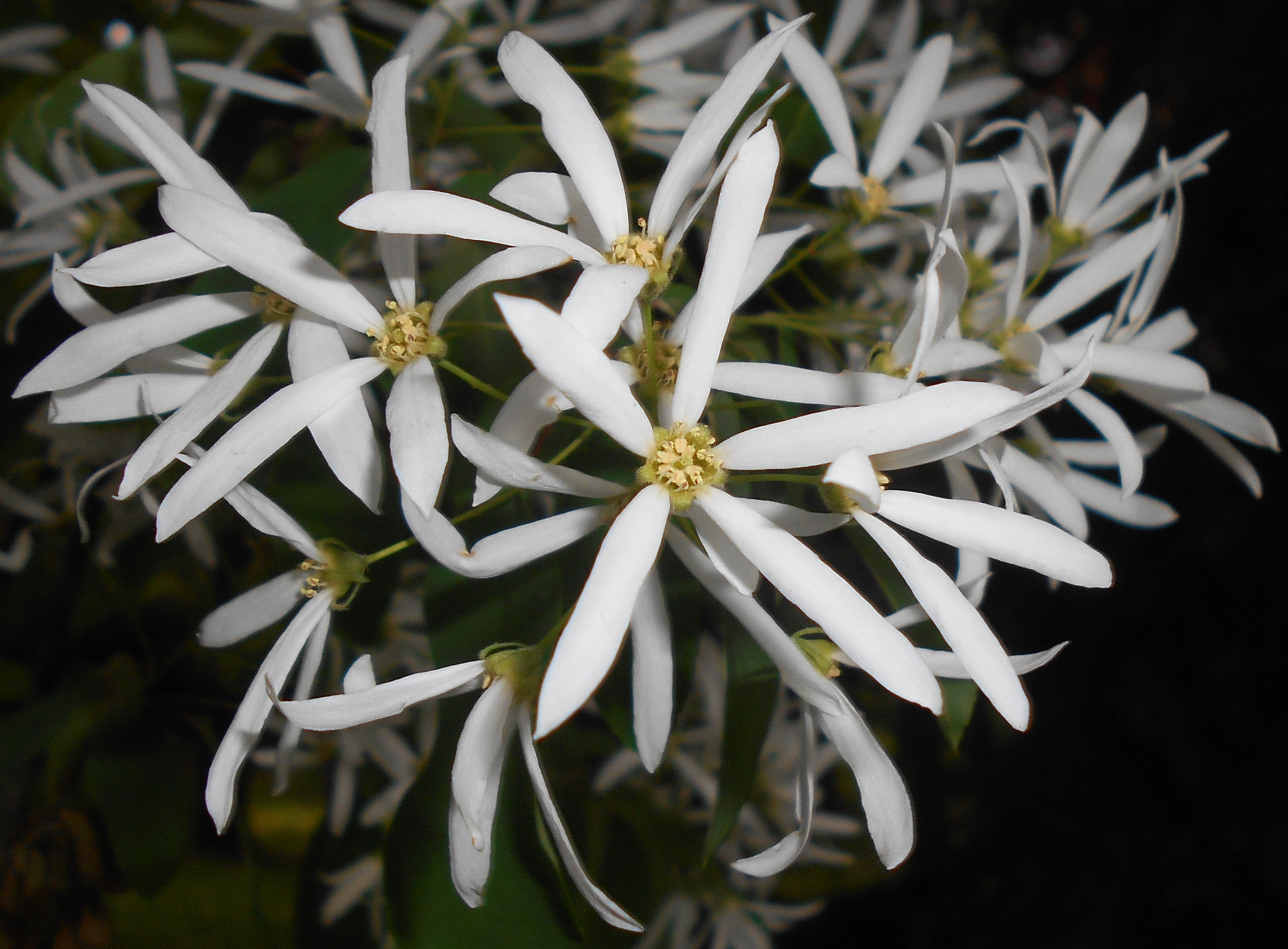

Scientific classification
- Kingdom: Plantae
- Clade: Tracheophytes
- Clade: Angiosperms
- Clade: Eudicots
- Clade: Rosids
- Order: Rosales
- Family: Rosaceae
- Genus: Amelanchier
- Species: A. sinica

Binomial name
- Amelanchier sinica (C.K.Schneid.) Chun

= Amelanchier sinica =

Species of plant

Amelanchier sinica, commonly known as the Chinese serviceberry, is a serviceberry native to China. Its fruit, a pome, is dark-blue when it ripens. Plants are found in Henan, Gansu, Shaanxi, Hubei, Sichuan provinces of China at elevations of 1000--2000 meters.
