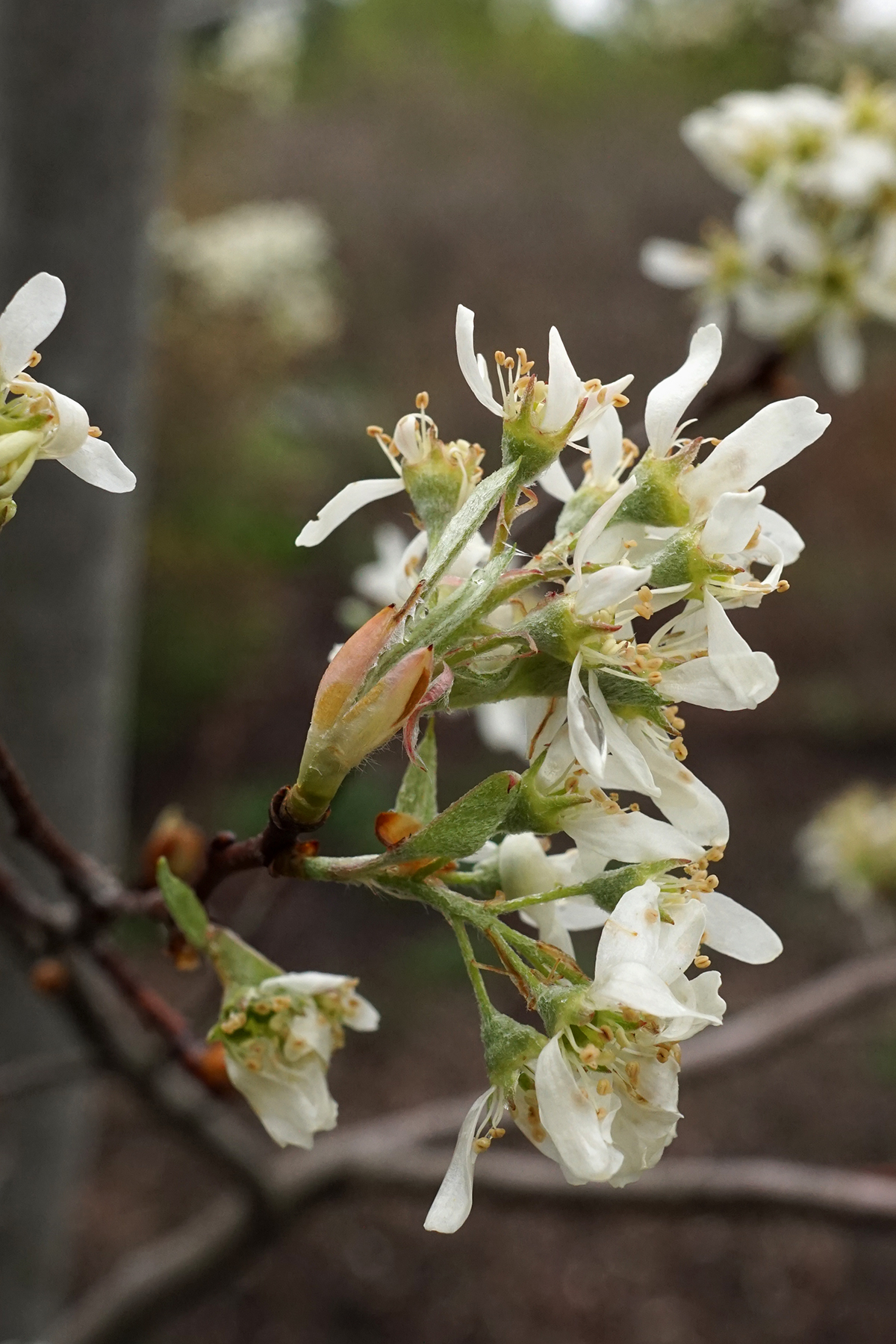

Conservation status
- Vulnerable (NatureServe)

Scientific classification
- Kingdom: Plantae
- Clade: Tracheophytes
- Clade: Angiosperms
- Clade: Eudicots
- Clade: Rosids
- Order: Rosales
- Family: Rosaceae
- Genus: Amelanchier
- Species: A. nantucketensis

Binomial name
- Amelanchier nantucketensis E.P.Bicknell

= Amelanchier nantucketensis =

Species of flowering plant

Amelanchier nantucketensis, also known as the Nantucket serviceberry or the Nantucket shadbush, produces edible fruit called pomes. Nantucket serviceberry is of conservation concern in the wild. Its distribution extends from Nantucket and Martha's Vineyard to Long Island and Staten Island. There are scattered occurrences in Maryland, Virginia, Maine, and Nova Scotia.

This shrub grows 2 to 5 feet tall. It forms colonies by extending stolons. It produces cream-colored flowers and blue fruits. The plant grows in dry, sandy, sunny habitat, including pine barrens and grasslands.

The plant is common on Nantucket.
