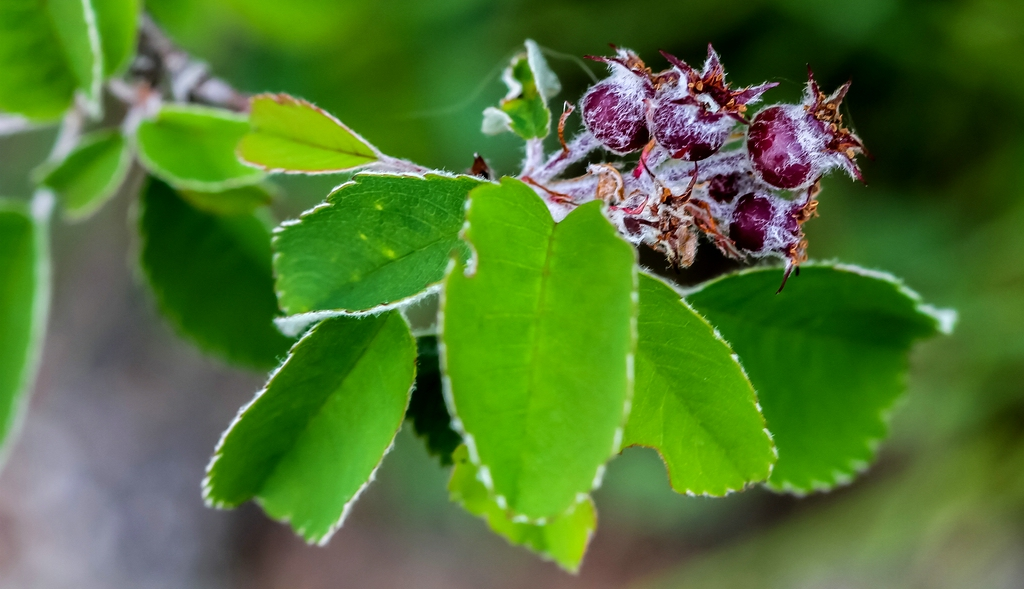
- Foliage and fruits
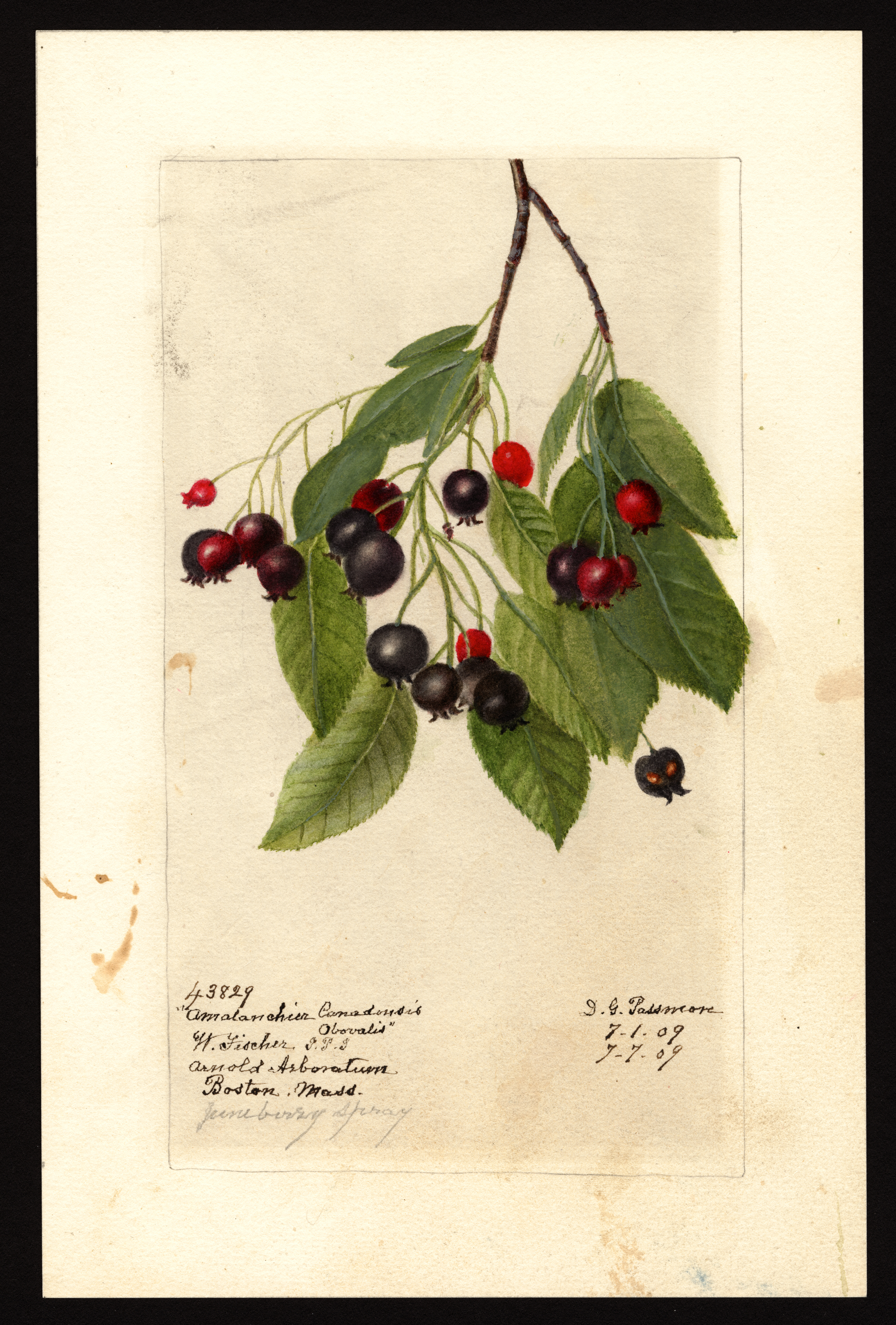
- Botanical illustration

Conservation status
- Apparently Secure (NatureServe)

Scientific classification
- Kingdom: Plantae
- Clade: Tracheophytes
- Clade: Angiosperms
- Clade: Eudicots
- Clade: Rosids
- Order: Rosales
- Family: Rosaceae
- Genus: Amelanchier
- Species: A. obovalis

Binomial name
- Amelanchier obovalis Ashe

Synonyms
- Amelanchier canadensis var. obovalis (Michx.) Britton, Sterns & Poggenb.; Amelanchier canadensis subsp. obovalis (Michx.) P.Landry; Mespilus canadensis var. obovalis Michx.

= Amelanchier obovalis =

Species of flowering plant

Amelanchier obovalis, the coastal serviceberry, coastal juneberry, or shadbush, is a species of flowering plant in the Rosaceae family. It is native to the Atlantic coastal plain of the United States, from New Jersey to Georgia, typically in pine barrens and other dry woodlands.

A deciduous shrub that grows to 3–5 ft (1–2 m) tall, with small five-petaled white flowers. It produces edible dark blue to purple-black fruits and has dull green leaves that can grow up to 2 in (50 mm) long.
