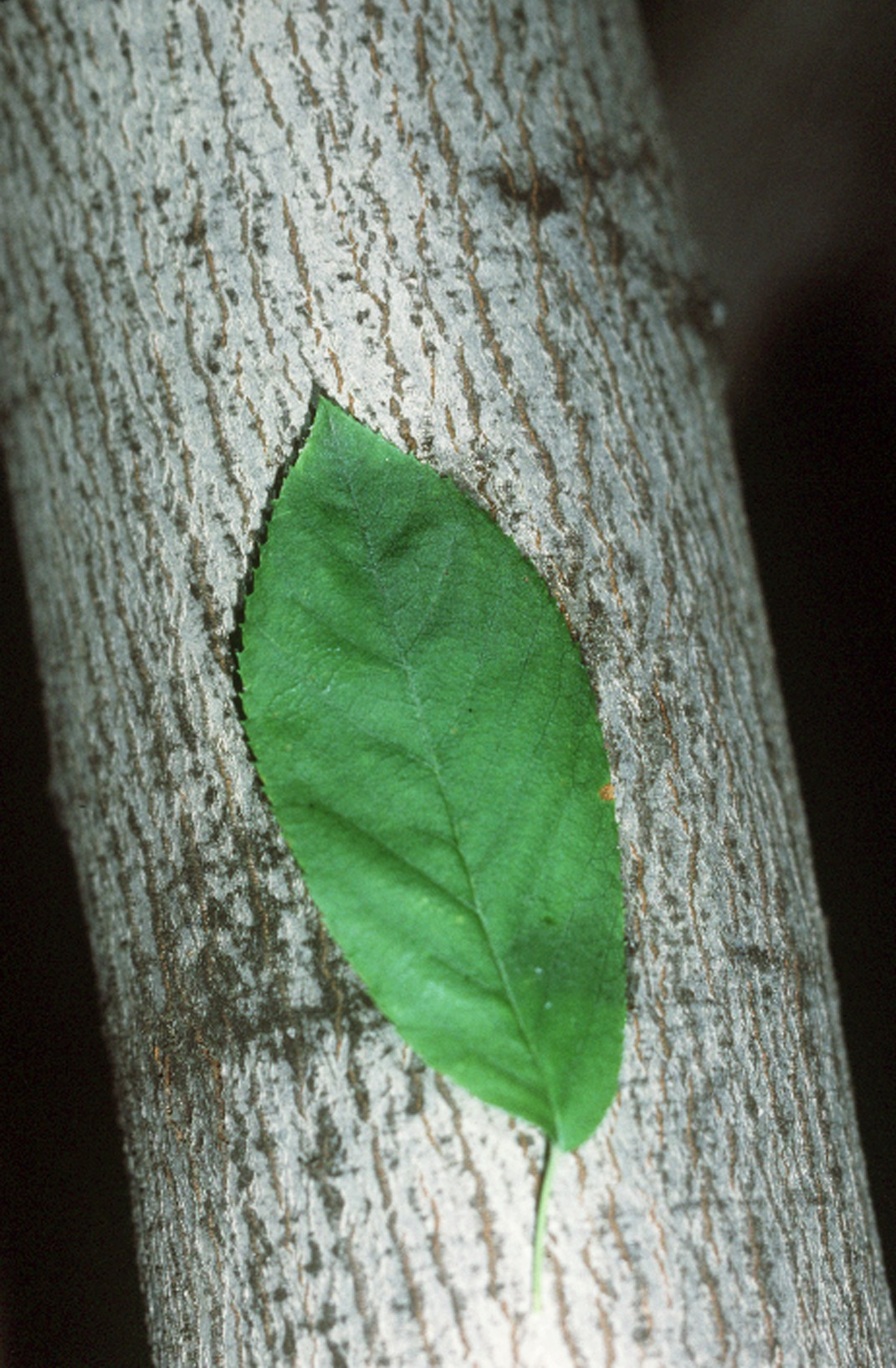
- Leaf and bark

Conservation status
- Least Concern (IUCN 3.1)

Scientific classification
- Kingdom: Plantae
- Clade: Tracheophytes
- Clade: Angiosperms
- Clade: Eudicots
- Clade: Rosids
- Order: Rosales
- Family: Rosaceae
- Genus: Amelanchier
- Species: A. laevis

Binomial name
- Amelanchier laevis Wiegand

Synonyms
- Synonymy: Amelanchier arborea var. cordifolia (Ashe) B.Boivin; Amelanchier arborea subsp. laevis (Wiegand) S.M.McKay ex P.Landry; Amelanchier arborea var. laevis (Wiegand) H.E.Ahles; Amelanchier botryapium G.B.Emers.; Amelanchier canadensis Torr. & A.Gray 1840, illegitimate homonym not (L.) Medik. 1793; Amelanchier laevis var. cordifolia Ashe; Amelanchier laevis f. nitida Wiegand; Amelanchier laevis var. nitida (Wiegand) Fernald; Pyrus botryapium Bigelow

= Amelanchier laevis =

Species of tree

Amelanchier laevis, the smooth shadbush, smooth serviceberry, or Allegheny serviceberry, is a North American species of tree in the rose family Rosaceae, growing up to 9 m (30 ft) tall. It is native to eastern Canada and the eastern United States, from Newfoundland west to Ontario, Minnesota, and Iowa, south as far as Georgia and Alabama.

== Description ==
Amelanchier laevis has stems of 1–17 m (3 ft 3.4 in – 55 ft 9.3 in), which grow in small clumps. Its petioles are 12–25 mm (0.5–1.0 in) with green blades, which are elliptical and almost ovate. The leaves have 12–17 lateral veins and six to eight teeth per cm. The white blossoms, which can be spectacular in mature specimens, develop from pink buds in spring. The fruit, which are pomes, ripen in autumn. They are edible, raw or cooked; they have a sweet flavor. The bark can be made into a herbal medicine for expectant mothers. It is a deciduous tree hardy in zones 4 to 8. It is cultivated as an ornamental shrub.

The cultivar 'R.J. Hilton', with richer spring and autumn leaf color than typical, has gained the Royal Horticultural Society's Award of Garden Merit.

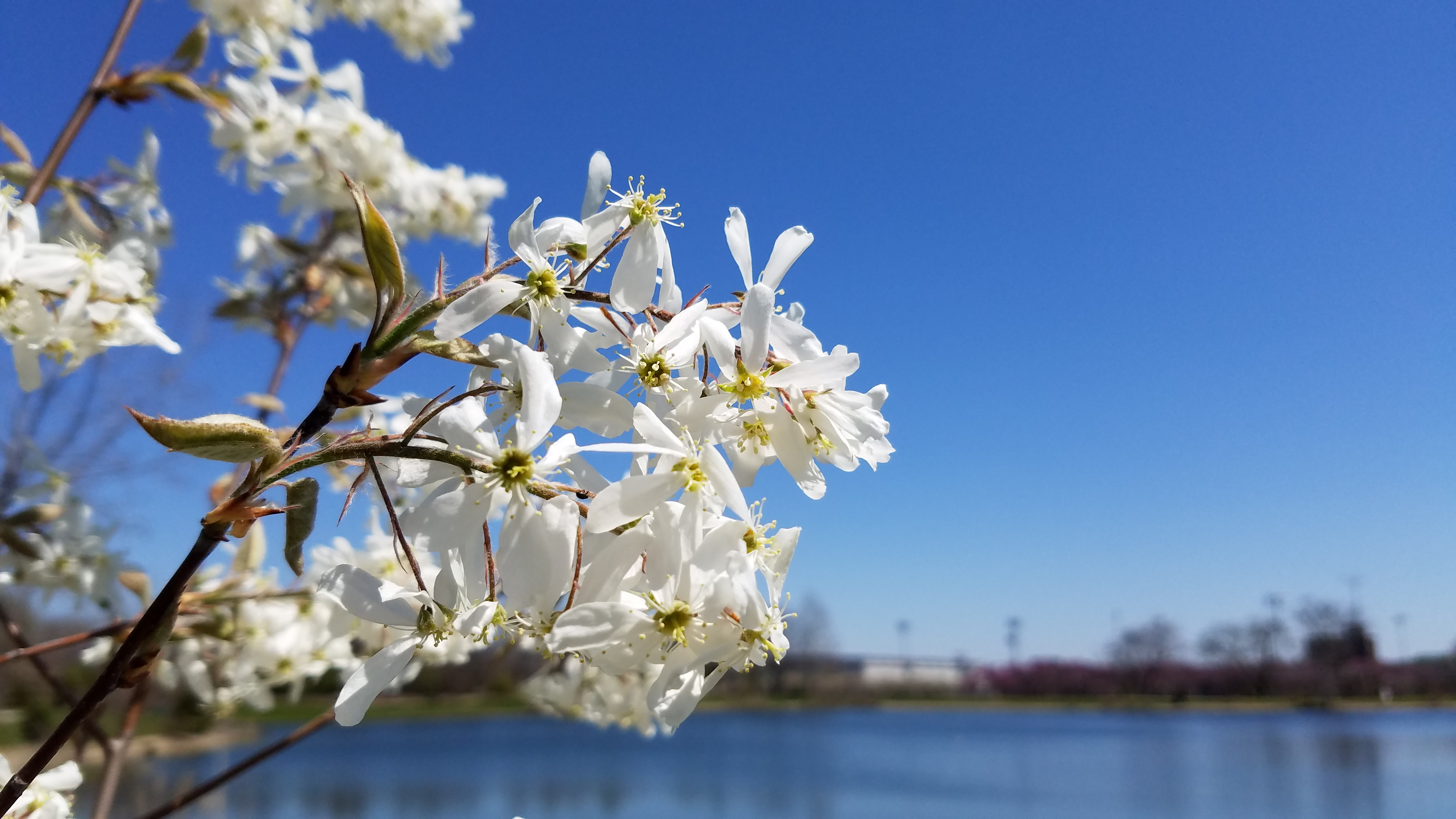

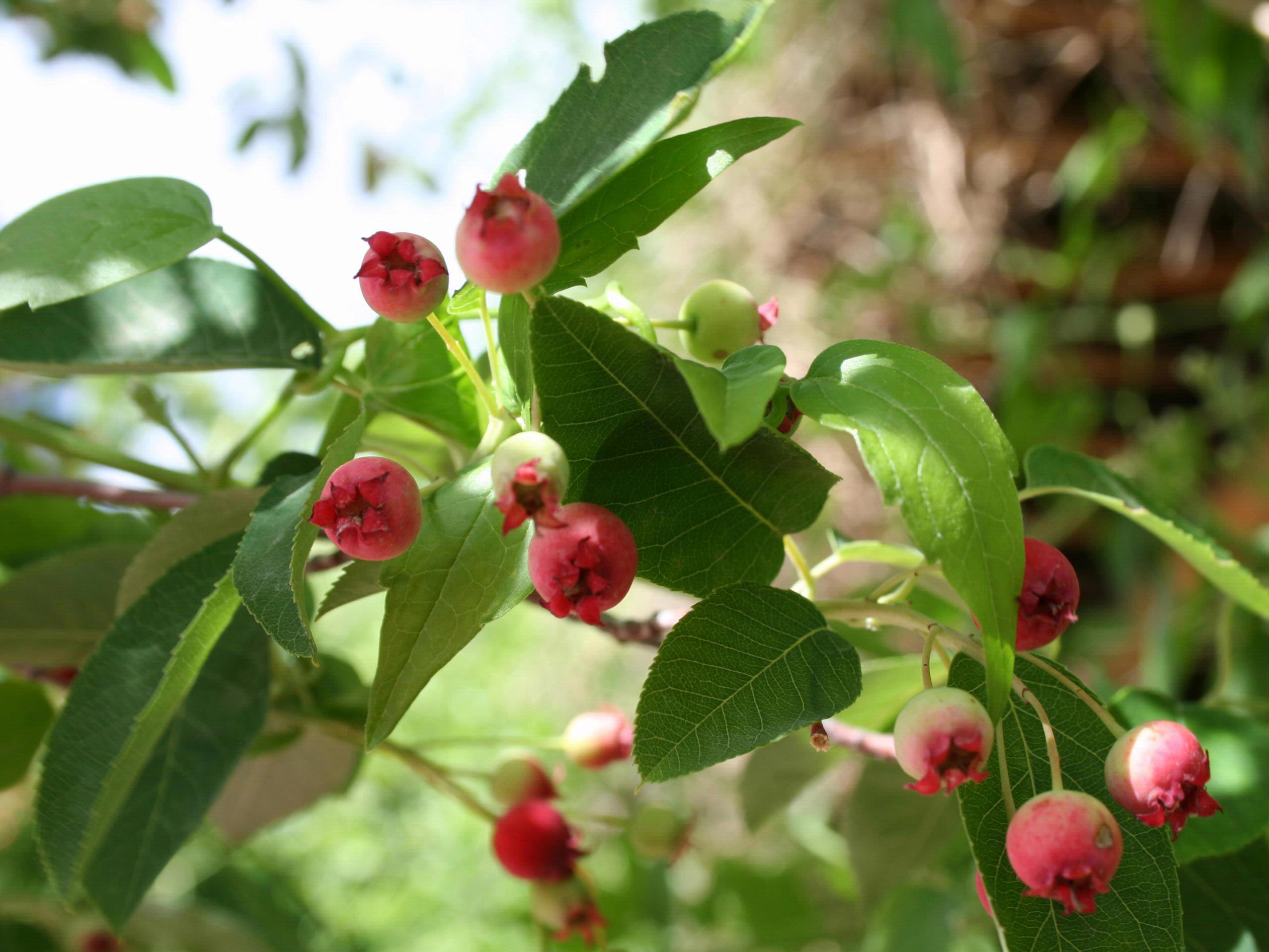
