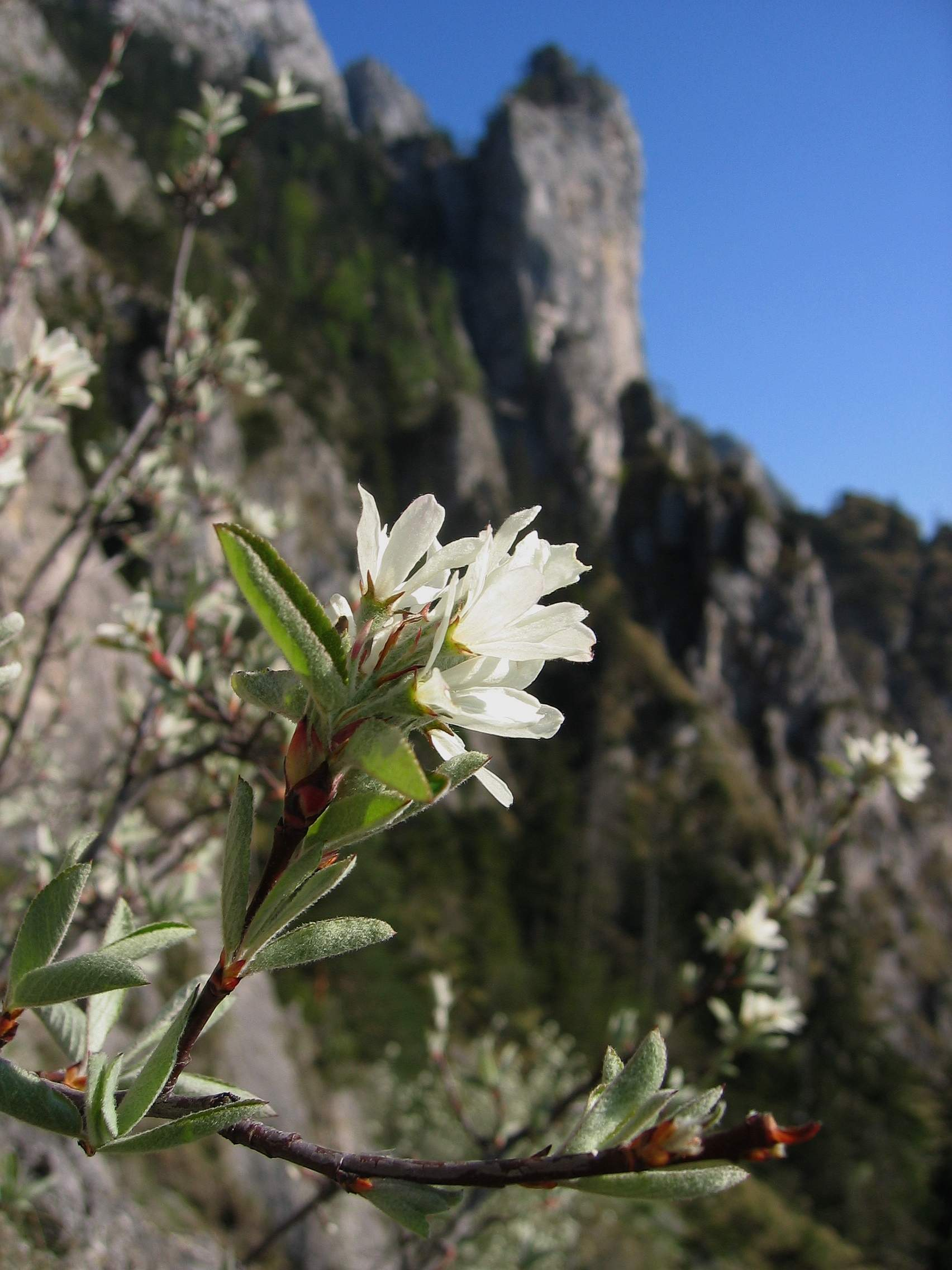

Scientific classification
- Kingdom: Plantae
- Clade: Tracheophytes
- Clade: Angiosperms
- Clade: Eudicots
- Clade: Rosids
- Order: Rosales
- Family: Rosaceae
- Genus: Amelanchier
- Species: A. ovalis

Binomial name
- Amelanchier ovalis Medik.

Synonyms
- Synonymy: Amelanchier amelanchier H.Karst.; Amelanchier amelanchier (L.) Degen; Amelanchier amelanchier (L.) Voss; Amelanchier rotundifolia (Lam.) Dum.Cours.; Amelanchier rotundifolia (Lam.) K.Koch; Amelanchier rupestris Bluff & Fingerh.; Amelanchier vulgaris Moench; Amelancus ovalis Vollm.; Aronia amelanchier (L.) Rchb.; Aronia amelanchier Dumort.; Aronia rotundifolia (Lam.) Pers.; Aronia rupestris (Bluff & Fingerh.) Rehder; Crataegus amelanchier (L.) Desf.; Crataegus rotundifolia Lam.; Mespilus amelanchier L.; Prunus amelanchier (L.) P.Gaertn., B.Mey. & Scherb.; Pyrenia amelanchier Clairv.; Pyrus amelanchier (L.) L.f.; Pyrus amelanchier (L.) Du Roi; Sorbus amelanchier (L.) Crantz

= Amelanchier ovalis =

Species of flowering plant

Amelanchier ovalis, commonly known as snowy mespilus (a name which is also attached to the related A. lamarckii) or serviceberry, is a deciduous shrub in the family Rosaceae. Its pome fruits are edible and can be eaten raw or cooked. The species is native to central and southern Europe, as well as North Africa and the Middle East.

== Description ==
There are 25 species of the genus Amelanchier reported from the northern hemisphere, and A. ovalis is the only naturally occurring species of that genus within Europe. A wide morphological variability has been reported for the flowers and leaves. There are two subspecies which can be distinguished by the number of chromosomes:

- the diploid (2n=34) A. ovalis subsp. ovalis
- the tetraploid (2n = 68) A. ovalis subsp. embergeri

Amelanchier ovalis is a thornless, summer-green shrub with an irregular spreading growth. It reaches heights of 3 m (9.8 ft), rarely 5 m (16 ft). The branches are slim and tightly erect in younger growing stages, becoming extended afterwards.

Young shoots are thin and white-haired, older shoots are olive or reddish-brown. The buds have felted hairs which is typical for this species. The leaves are round or egg-shaped and reach a length of 2 to 5 cm. The top side of the leaves is bald, the underside initially is hairy, but this is lost throughout the growing season. The white flowers, which are herbaceous, develop lateral and terminal from previous years branches between April and May. The flowers build 3 to 8 erect inflorescences at the end of the shoots.

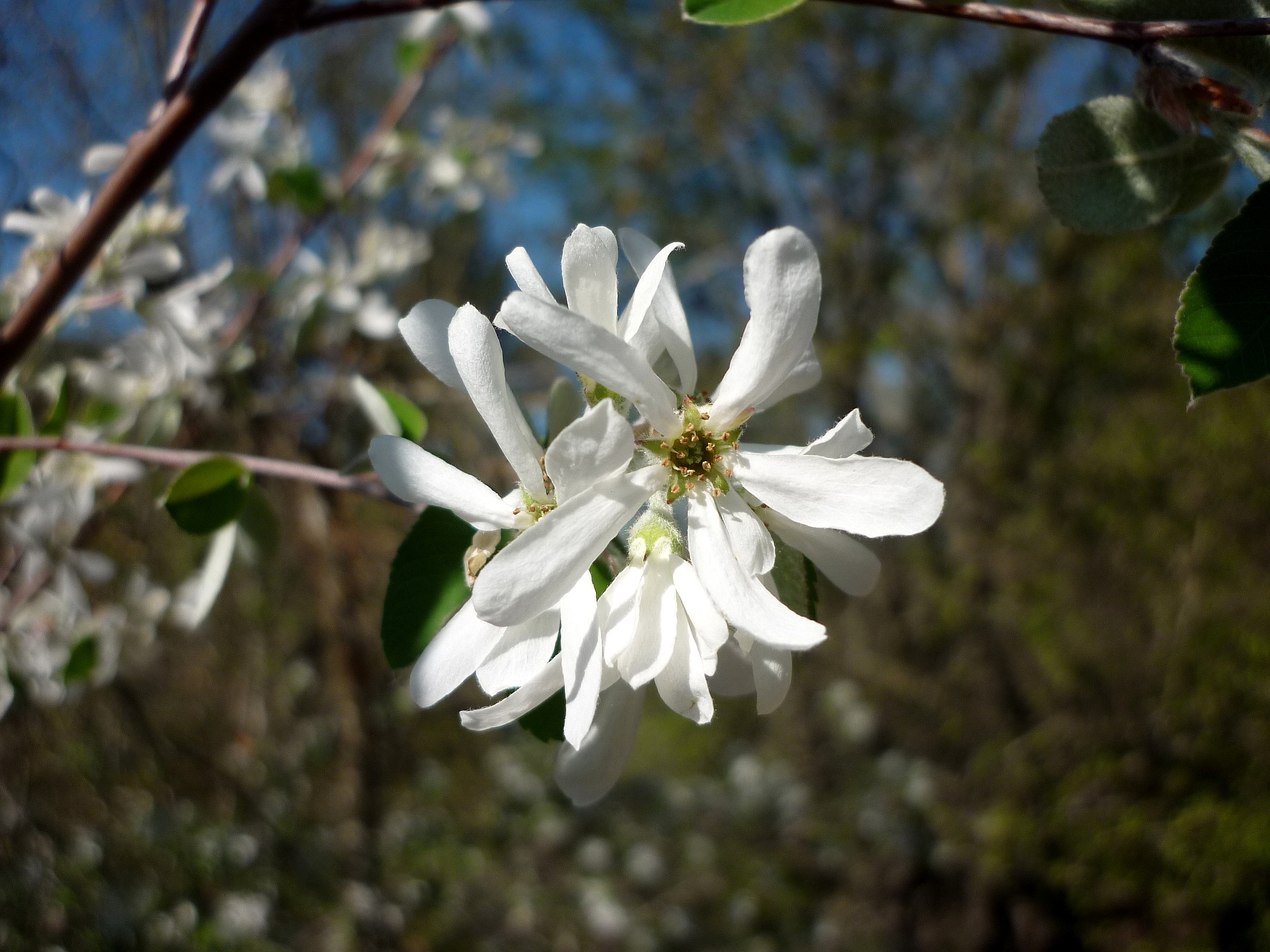
Flowers

The fruits are small (1 cm) and spherical, ripening between July and August. When ripe, the fruits become black and contain only a small amount of flesh.

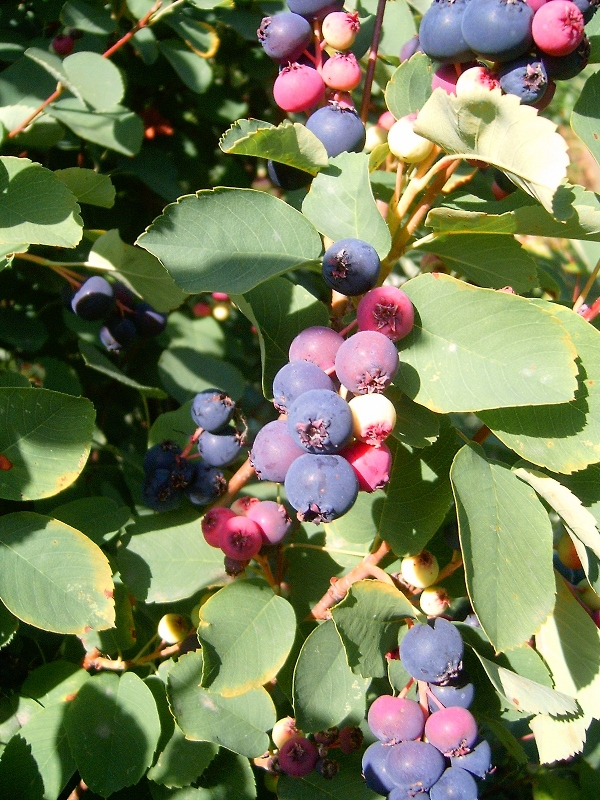
Fruits

== Distribution and habitat ==
Amelanchier ovalis can be found in prealpine and submediterranean climates reaching from colline to sub-alpine zones. The most southern place with recorded plants is in Morocco, the most eastern place is in Azerbaijan and the Caucasus. Plants have been observed in the Valais in Switzerland at an elevation of 2,000 m (6,600 ft), and in the Atlas Mountains at 2,800 m (9,200 ft).

A. ovalis prefers sunny, dry steep slopes, light oak and pine forests and semi-dry grasslands. It grows well in south-facing positions, on rocks with calcareous substrates.

== Ecology ==
Amelanchier ovalis grows in areas which are characterized by moderately dry alternating with moist conditions. It is drought resistant, and is for this reason an indicator species for dry conditions. Soil pH ranges from neutral to alkaline (pH 5.5 - 8.5). Therefore, plants are found on limy grounds.

Due to its pioneer features, Amelanchier ovalis is able to establish on nutrient poor and stony substrates, and can stabilize soils. For this reason, this species is used for land restoration, afforestation or reconstruction of habitats.

Amelanchier ovalis is an important food source for different insect species providing nectar. The plants are dependent on insect pollination, because self-pollination is inhibited by early ripening of stamens.

In a higher phenological stage of the plant, when plants have built ripe fruits, they are often eaten by birds or mammals. Through that, seeds of A. ovalis are dispersed by these animals. Depending on the location A.ovalis can propagate vegetatively via root shoots.

== Pathology ==
Gall mites of the genus Eriophyes and Aceria cause damage to buds and calyxes by gall formation on leaves. A. ovalis can also suffer from browsing by game and grazing livestock. By contrast, the spotted wing drosophila (Drosophila suzukii) does not infest the fruit of the snowy mespilus.

A. ovalis can be infested by various species of rust fungi (e.g. Gymnosporangium amelanchieris), and consequently serves as a host plant. Leaves, shoots, flowers and fruits can be affected. In most cases, the damage is insignificant, and the rust fungus does not threaten the survival of the shrub. However, depending on the type of infestation, fruit set may be reduced. A. ovalis is also a host plant of the fire blight pathogen Erwinia amylovora and is highly susceptible to it. In extreme cases, infection with fire blight can even lead to the death of the shrub. In very dry years, a weak powdery mildew infestation could be observed.

== Uses ==
Amelanchier ovalis can be used for land restoration and afforestation, thanks to its pioneer features. The berries can be eaten fresh, although they taste rather bland. More often they are processed for jam, compote or spirits. Extracts from twigs, leaves and bark can be used for medicinal purposes, due to their richness in biologically active substances, such as polyphenols.
