= Karl McKay Wiegand =

American botanist (1873–1942)

- Born: 2 June 1873
- Died: 12 March 1942 (aged 68)
- Scientific career
- Fields: Botany
- Workplaces: University

Karl McKay Wiegand (June 2, 1873 – March 12, 1942) was an American botanist who headed the Department of Botany at Cornell University for 28 years. He was a member of the Botanical Society of America and served as its president in 1939.

Wiegand was married to Maud Cipperly who collected with him.

The standard author abbreviation Wiegand is used to indicate this person as the author when citing a botanical name.
