= × Rhaphiobotrya =

Scientific classification
- Kingdom: Plantae
- Clade: Tracheophytes
- Clade: Angiosperms
- Clade: Eudicots
- Clade: Rosids
- Order: Rosales
- Family: Rosaceae
- Genus: × Rhaphiobotrya; Coombes

Species
- × Rhaphiobotrya splendens Hodel & Greby

Nothogenus of flowering plant

× Rhaphiobotrya is an artificial hybrid genus (nothogenus) that occurred in cultivation between Eriobotrya and Rhaphiolepis. The genus was first described in 2008 for the cultivar × Rhaphiobotrya 'Coppertone', which had been previously listed under several species of Eriobotrya and Rhaphiolepis. At least three further cultivars are known.

== Description ==
The genus is based on × Rhaphiobotrya 'Coppertone', which is an evergreen shrub growing to 5–6 m (16–20 ft) high. The young leaves are a bronze colour and have reddish hairs. As the leaves age, the leaves lose their hairs and become green, shiny above and paler below. Mature leaves are up to 6 cm (2.4 in) wide by 21 cm (8.3 in) long in total, of which the petiole makes up about 5 cm (2.0 in). The fragrant flowers are arranged in a terminal panicle. Each flower has five almost circular petals about 8 mm (0.3 in) long, notched at the tips. The flower is pale pink shading to white at the centre, fading to white all over as it ages. There are usually 15 stamens, occasionally fewer, and three styles. The stamens appear to be sterile and fruit is not produced.

Three further cultivars have been assigned to the genus and are broadly similar to × Rhaphiobotrya 'Coppertone'.

== Taxonomy ==
The genera Eriobotrya and Rhaphiolepis are placed in the subtribe Malinae or Pyrinae. Together with Photinia they form a closely related group. In 2020, it was proposed to merge Eriobotrya into Rhaphiolepis, which would make × Rhaphiobotrya a junior synonym of Rhaphiolepis. As of August 2024, all three genera are accepted by Plants of the World Online.

=== Origin ===
× Rhaphiobotrya 'Montic' (Majestic Beauty) was probably the first hybrid discovered; a US plant patent was granted in 1973. 'Coppertone' was discovered in June 1970 in Glendora, Los Angeles County. It was described as a seedling of Eriobotrya deflexa, but differing in a number of aspects, including the coppery-red young leaves. The pollen parent was unknown. A US plant patent was granted in 1978. All the cultivars of × Rhaphiobotrya are also likely to be derived from Eriobotrya deflexa, while the other parent may be Rhaphiolepis indica, Rhaphiolepis × delacourii, or another cultivar of × Rhaphiobotrya. In 2020, a species name was provided for the hybrids, × Rhaphiobotrya splendens. No species are listed by Plants of the World Online as of August 2024.

== Cultivars ==
Known cultivars of × Rhaphiobotrya include:

- 'Coppertone' – the basis of the hybrid genus
- 'Fullerton' – the largest cultivar, its large leaves having more primary veins than the other cultivars; more obviously intermediate between the parent genera
- 'Montic' (Majestic Beauty) – probably the first Eriobotrya × Rhaphiolepis hybrid raised; compared to 'Coppertone', it is taller with very large flower clusters, and closer in appearance to a Rhaphiolepis
- 'Sienna Glow' – similar to 'Coppertone', but possibly shorter, growing to 2.5 m (8 ft) high
