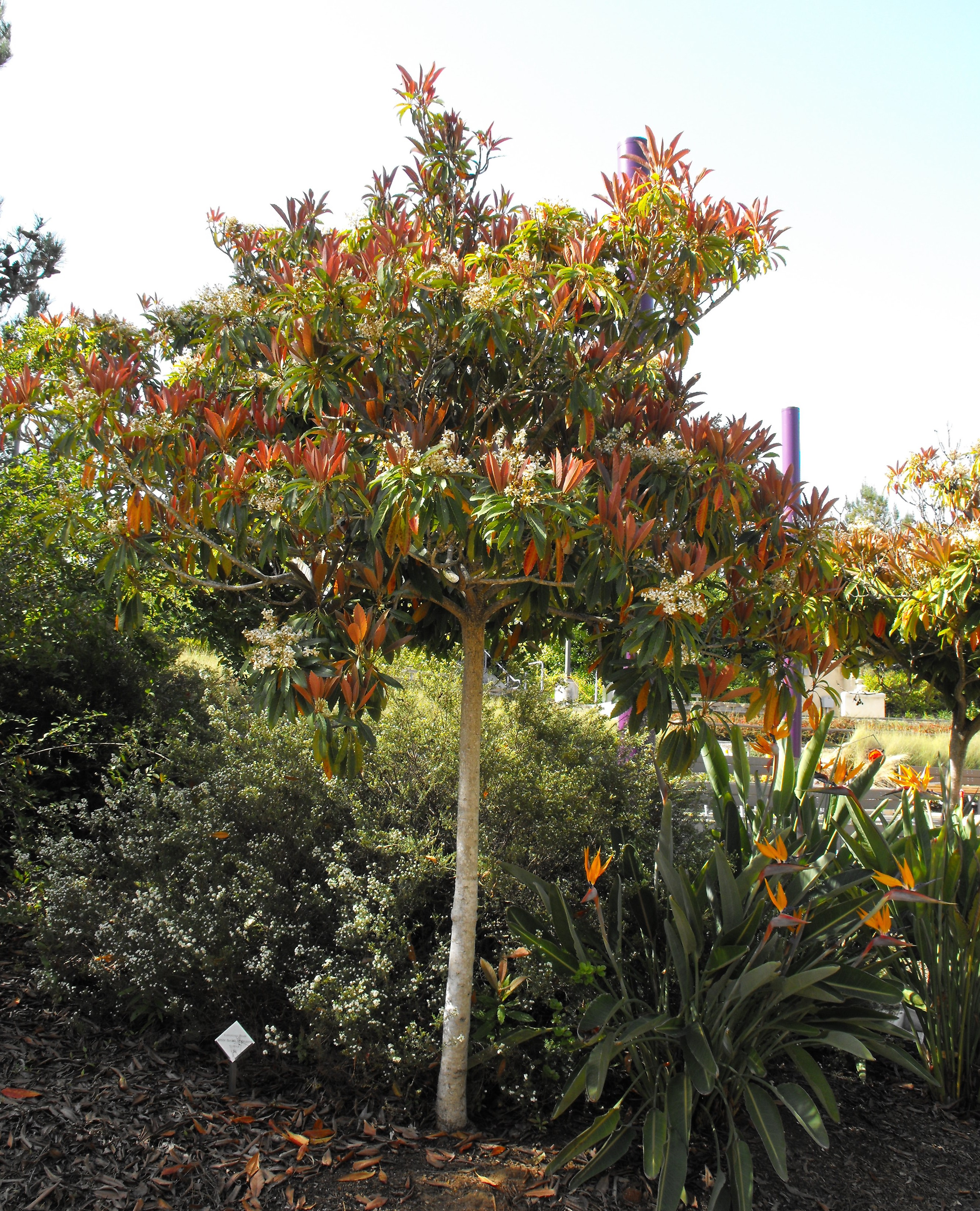

Conservation status
- Least Concern (IUCN 3.1)

Scientific classification
- Kingdom: Plantae
- Clade: Tracheophytes
- Clade: Angiosperms
- Clade: Eudicots
- Clade: Rosids
- Order: Rosales
- Family: Rosaceae
- Genus: Eriobotrya
- Species: E. deflexa

Binomial name
- Eriobotrya deflexa (Hemsl.) Nakai

Synonyms
- Eriobotrya buisanensis (Hayata) Kaneh.; Photinia buisanensis Hayata; Photinia deflexa Hemsl.; Pyrus deflexa (Hemsl.) M.F.Fay & Christenh.; Rhaphiolepis deflexa (Hemsl.) B.B.Liu & J.Wen

= Eriobotrya deflexa =

Species of flowering plant

Eriobotrya deflexa, the bronze loquat, is a tree native to China (Guangdong, Hainan), Taiwan and Vietnam.

Its leaves are used in Taiwanese folk medicine as an expectorant.

== Hybrids ==
× Rhaphiobotrya is an artificial hybrid genus between species of Eriobotrya and Rhaphiolepis. Hybrids include the coppertone loquat (× Rhaphiobotrya 'Coppertone'), the parents of which are Eriobotrya deflexa and Rhaphiolepis indica or R. × delacourii. It is a popular cultivated shrub in the Southern United States and California.
