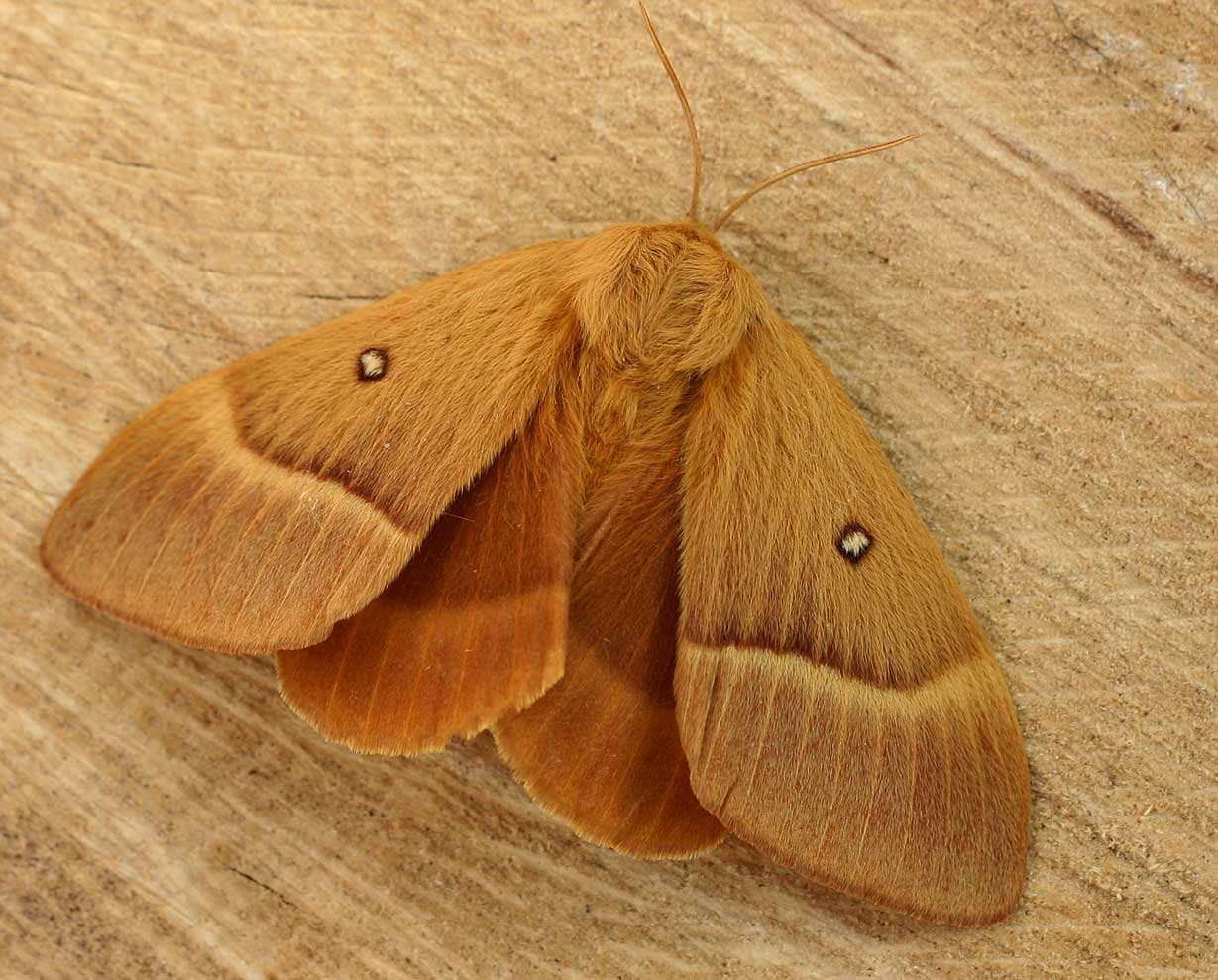

Scientific classification
- Kingdom: Animalia
- Phylum: Arthropoda
- Class: Insecta
- Order: Lepidoptera
- Family: Lasiocampidae
- Genus: Lasiocampa
- Species: L. quercus

Binomial name
- Lasiocampa quercus (Linnaeus, 1758)

= Oak eggar =

Species of moth

The oak eggar (Lasiocampa quercus) is a common moth of the family Lasiocampidae found in Europe and northern and western parts of Asia. It feeds on a variety of plant species (mainly heather and bilberry), and may develop over two years in higher latitudes, where it may be known as the northern eggar. Its specific name quercus refers to the fact that its cocoon generally resembles an acorn, not that its primary food source is oak.

== Habitat ==
The oak eggar's habitat is wide-ranging, including scrub, heath, moor, downland, hedges and sea cliffs, reflecting the larva's very varied range of food plants.

== Lifecycle ==
=== Adult ===
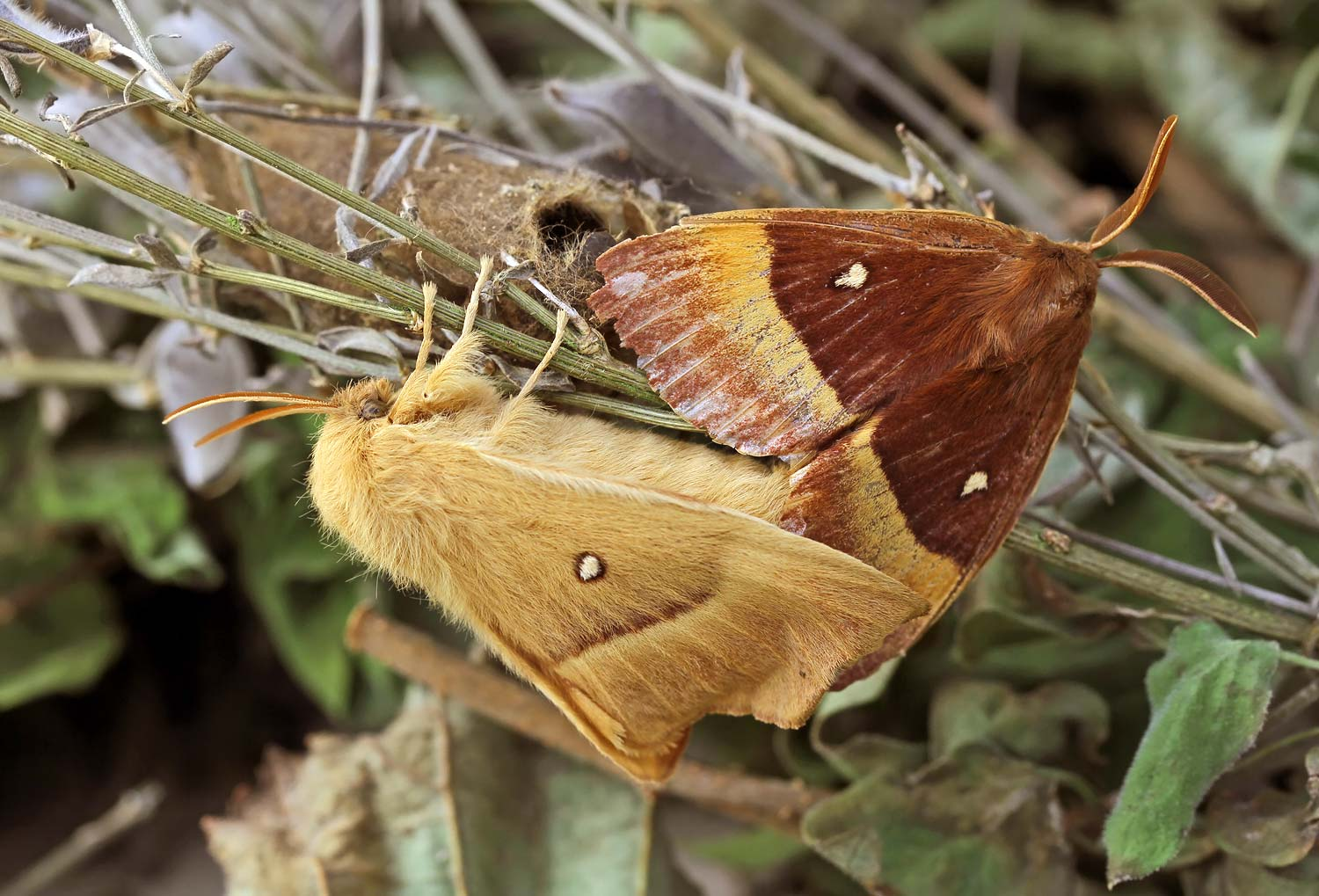
Mating

The moth's wingspan is about 45 mm (male) to 75 mm (female), the female being larger and paler than the male. It is Britain's largest day-flying moth.

The oak eggar is on the wing for about two months between May and September, depending on the latitude. In more northerly latitudes, development can span two years, with larvae overwintering the first year, and the pupae in the second year. In northern areas it is known as the northern eggar; this was formerly thought to be a separate species, but is generally assumed to be a subspecies Lasiocampa quercus callunae, there is no clear geographical separation of the two types, but the northern eggar tends to be the larger of the two. There are morphological differences and different food preferences. Males tend to be day fliers, while females tend to fly from dusk.

Unpaired females may attract a large number of males, and eggs are laid loosely in undergrowth.

=== Larva ===
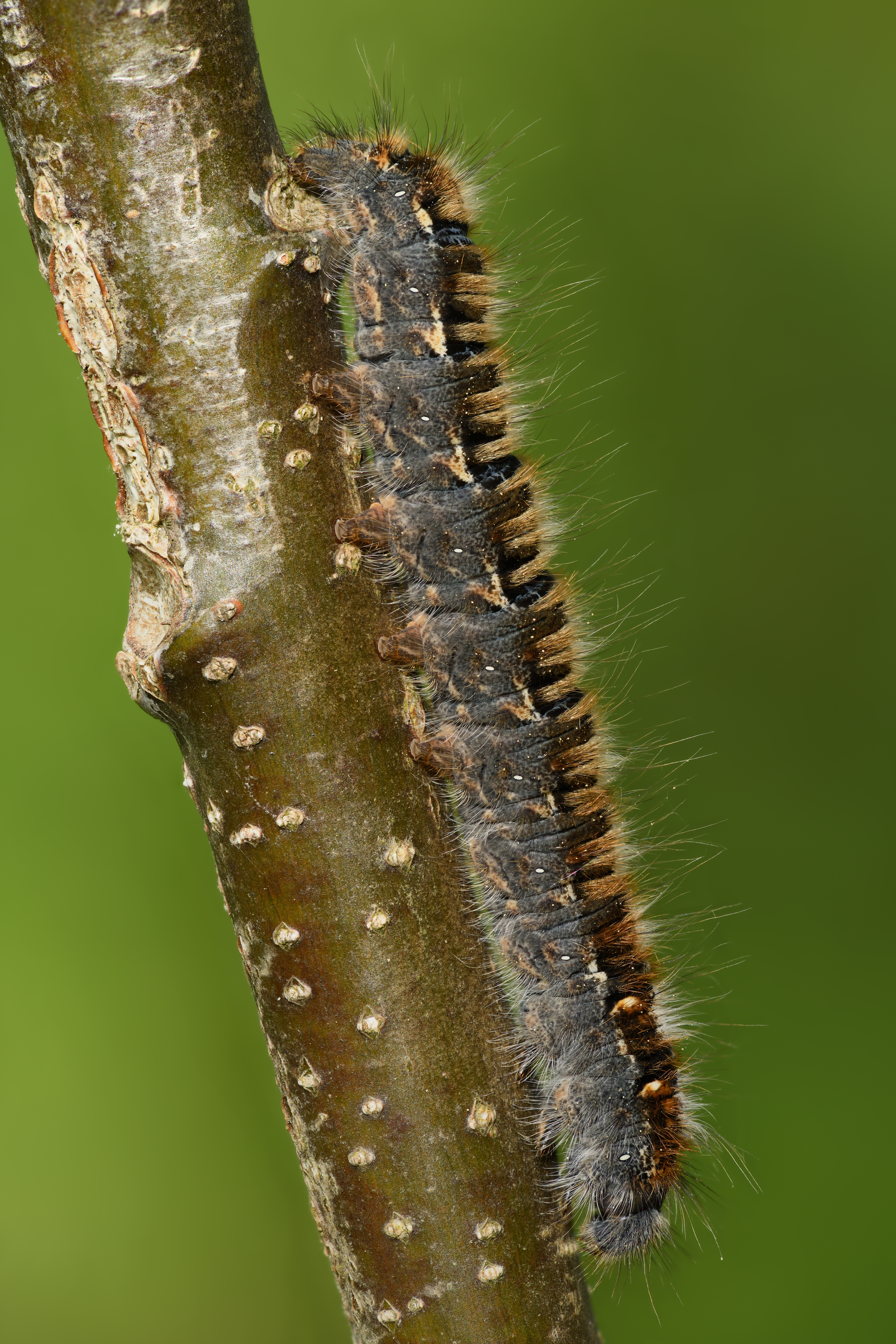
Fourth-instar caterpillar

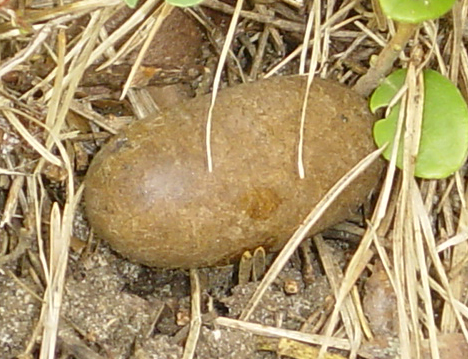
Cocoon

Larvae feed on a wide variety of plant species, low down, including blackthorn, hawthorn, viburnum, dogwood, ivy and ling, bilberry, broom, larch, birch, willow, hazel, sea buckthorn and Rubus species, including bramble. It is not known to feed on oak; however, one entomologist (Brues, 1924) is quoted as saying:

The Oak Eggar caterpillar (Lasiocampa quercus), a pest particularly of oak forests, is known to be capable of adapting itself to a variety of trees in default of oak

Larvae can be infected by a baculovirus, a virus that changes their behaviour, causing them to climb out of the protection of low scrub and leave them open to predation, facilitating the spread of the infection.

The caterpillar hairs of some species of moth, such as the oak processionary moth (Thaumetopoea processionea), can cause skin irritation, but there is no evidence that the oak eggar is one of these, despite the similar name.

=== Pupa ===
The caterpillar pupates on the ground inside a silken cocoon, the exterior of which is hard and yellowish, and resembles an acorn, hence the moth's name. Eggar is an obsolete word relating to the shape of the cocoon.

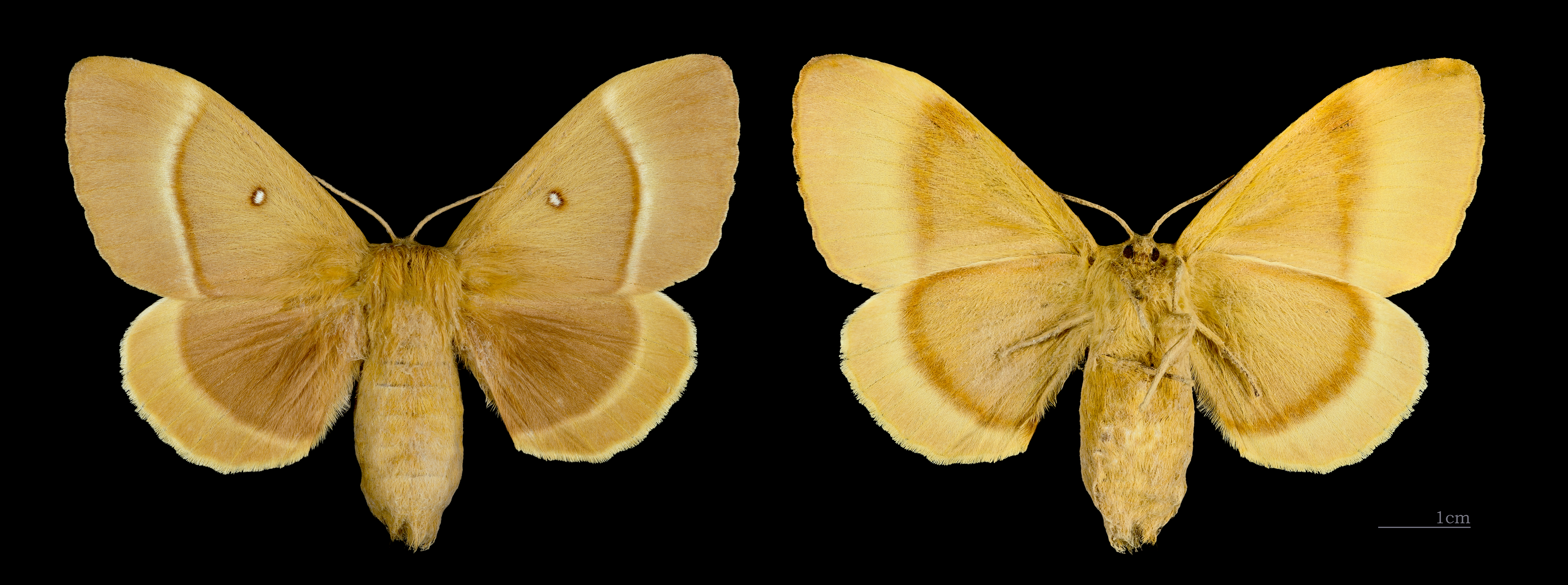
Female, dorsal left

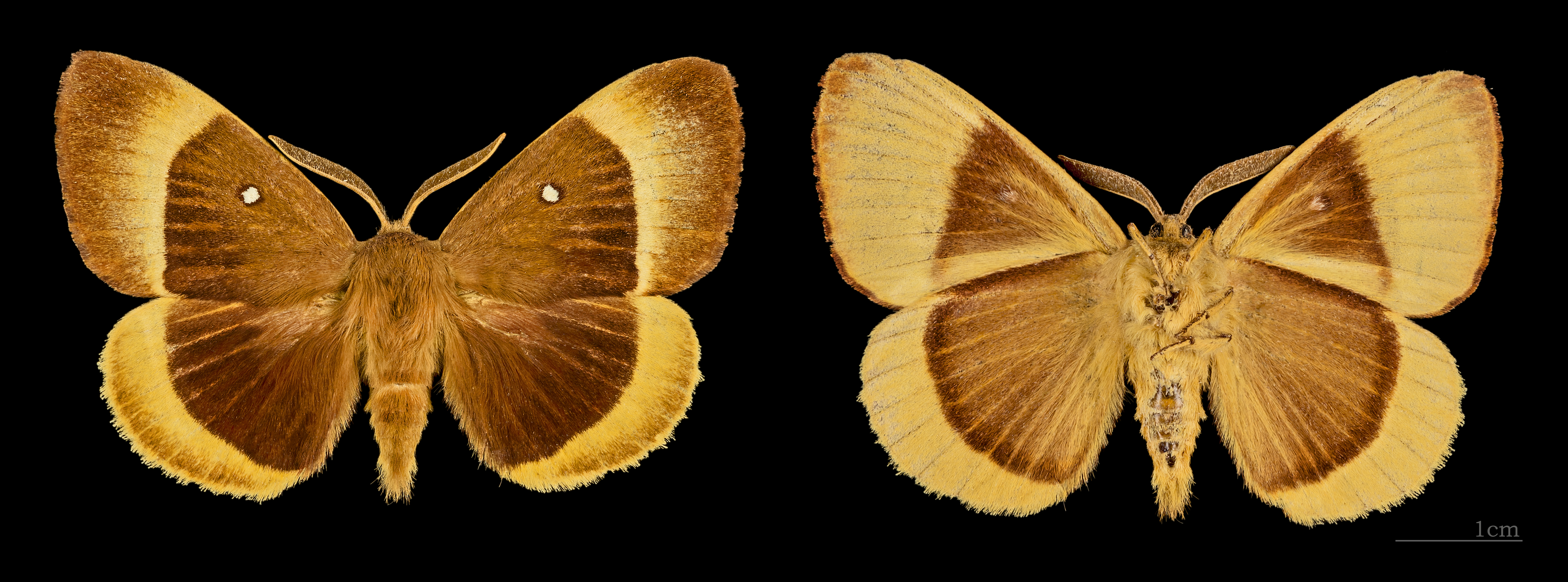
Male, dorsal left
