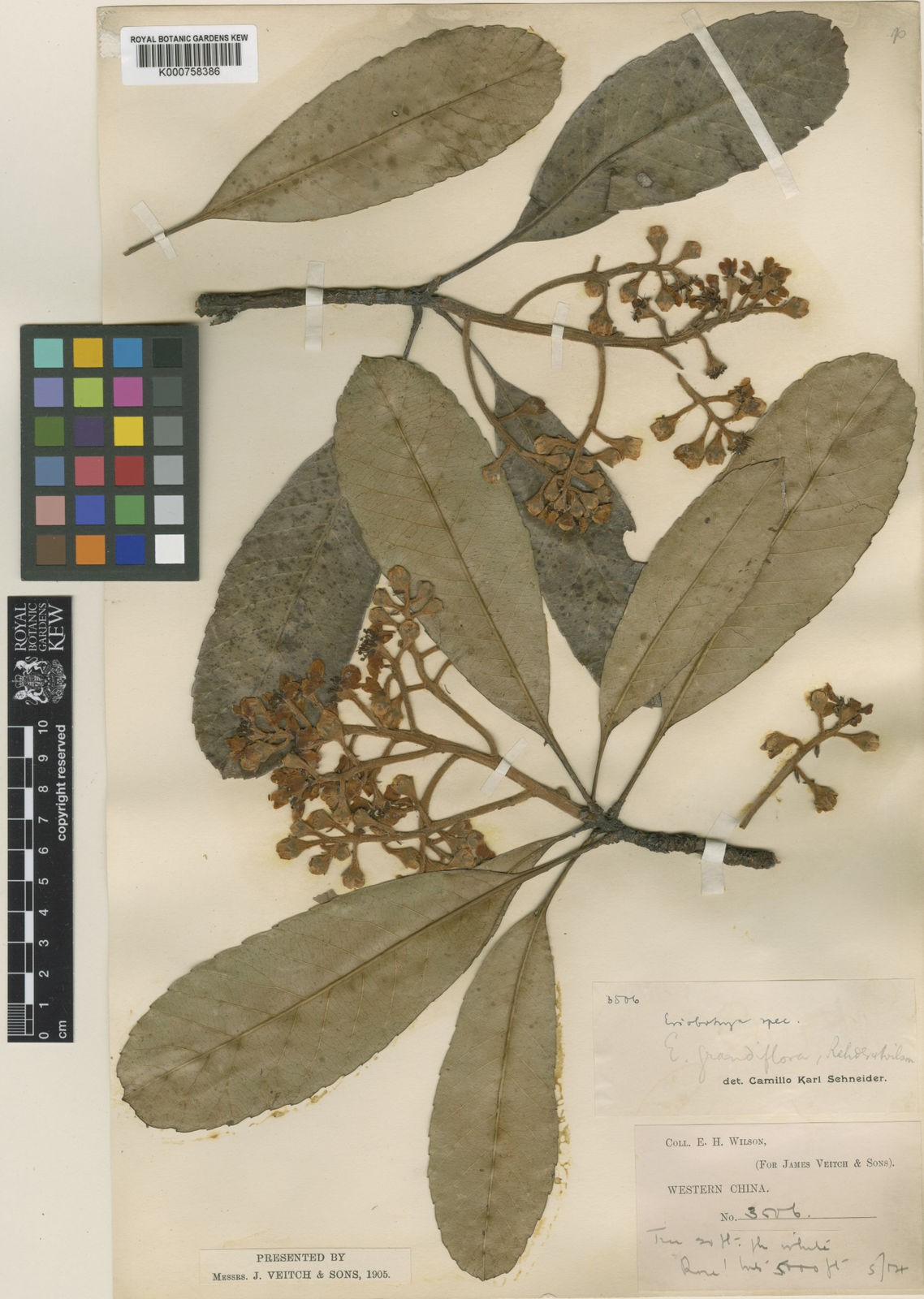

Conservation status
- Least Concern (IUCN 3.1)

Scientific classification
- Kingdom: Plantae
- Clade: Embryophytes
- Clade: Tracheophytes
- Clade: Spermatophytes
- Clade: Angiosperms
- Clade: Eudicots
- Clade: Rosids
- Order: Rosales
- Family: Rosaceae
- Genus: Eriobotrya
- Species: E. cavaleriei

Binomial name
- Eriobotrya cavaleriei (H.Lév.) Rehder

Synonyms
- Hiptage cavaleriei H.Lév.; Pyrus athenae M.F.Fay & Christenh.; Rhaphiolepis cavaleriei (H.Lév.) B.B.Liu & J.Wen; Eriobotrya brackloi Hand.-Mazz.; Eriobotrya brackloi var. atrichophylla Hand.-Mazz.; Eriobotrya cavaleriei var. brackloi (Hand.-Mazz.) Rehder; Eriobotrya deflexa var. grandiflora (Rehder & E.H.Wilson) Nakai; Eriobotrya grandiflora Rehder & E.H.Wilson

= Eriobotrya cavaleriei =

Species of flowering plant

Eriobotrya cavaleriei is a species of flowering plant in the family Rosaceae. It is a tree with leathery leaves, white flowers, and yellowish-red fruits. The species is native to China, Laos, and Vietnam.

Eriobotrya cavaleriei was described in 1912, and is listed as of Least Concern by the IUCN.

== Taxonomy ==
The species was described by Augustin Abel Hector Léveillé in 1912. Léveillé placed the species in the genus Hiptage. In 1932, Alfred Rehder moved the species to Eriobotrya. The species has also been placed in Rhaphiolepis.

== Distribution ==
Eriobotrya cavaleriei is native to the subtropical biome of China (Fujian, Guangdong, Guangxi, Guizhou, Hubei, Hunan, Jiangxi, and Sichuan), Laos, and Vietnam. The species' estimated extent of occurrence is 1,407,124.63 square kilometres (543,293.86 sq mi).

Eriobotrya cavaleriei grows on slopes and in mixed riverside forests, at elevations of 500–2,000 metres (1,600–6,600 ft).

== Description ==
Eriobotrya cavaleriei is a tree that grows 4–5 metres (13–16 ft) high. The branchlets are stout and brownish-yellow.

The leaves are oblong, oblong-lanceolate, or oblong-oblanceolate in shape, leathery, 7–18 centimetres (2.8–7.1 in) long, and 2.5–7 centimetres (0.98–2.76 in) wide. The leaf stems are 1.5–4 centimetres (0.59–1.57 in) long.

The inflorescence is a 9–12 centimetres (3.5–4.7 in) wide panicle with many flowers. The flower stems are 3–10 millimetres (0.12–0.39 in) long. The flowers are 1.5–2.5 centimetres (0.59–0.98 in) wide. The hypanthium is cup-shaped. The sepals are triangular-ovate, and 2–3 millimetres (0.079–0.118 in) long. The petals are white, obovate, and 8–10 millimetres (0.31–0.39 in) long. The flowers have twenty stamens. The plant flowers from April to May.

The fruit is an elliptical or subglobose, yellowish-red pome measuring 1–1.5 centimetres (0.39–0.59 in) wide. The plant fruits from July to August.

== Conservation ==
In 2018, the IUCN assessed Eriobotrya cavaleriei as of Least Concern. It has a wide distribution, a large population, and faces no major threats.

== Nomenclature ==
In Chinese, the species is known as 大花枇杷 (da hua pi ba).
