= R. salicifolia =

R. salicifolia may refer to:

- Rhaphiolepis salicifolia, a plant species in the genus Rhaphiolepis
- Ruellia salicifolia, a flowering plant species in the genus Ruellia

== See also ==
- Salicifolia (disambiguation)
