= Catenina kennedyi =

Scientific classification
- Kingdom: Animalia
- Phylum: Arthropoda
- Clade: Pancrustacea
- Class: Insecta
- Order: Lepidoptera
- Superfamily: Noctuoidea
- Family: Erebidae
- Subfamily: Arctiinae
- Genus: Catenina
- Species: C. kennedyi

Binomial name
- Catenina kennedyi (Rothschild, 1910)

Synonyms
- Ecpantheria kennedyi Rothschild, 1910; Hypercompe kennedyi (Rothschild, 1910)

Species of moth

Catenina kennedyi is a species of moth in the family Erebidae. It was first described by Walter Rothschild in 1910 and is found in Minas Gerais, Brazil.
