= Catenina =

Scientific classification
- Kingdom: Animalia
- Phylum: Arthropoda
- Clade: Pancrustacea
- Class: Insecta
- Order: Lepidoptera
- Superfamily: Noctuoidea
- Family: Erebidae
- Subfamily: Arctiinae
- Subtribe: Spilosomina
- Genus: Catenina; Burmeister, 1883

Type species
- Ecpantheria heterogena Oberthür, 1881

Synonyms
- Hypercompe (Catenina) Burmeister, 1883

Genus of moths

Catenina is a genus of tiger moths in the family Erebidae that was erected by Hermann Burmeister in 1883.

== Taxonomy ==
For many years, the taxon was classified as a subgenus of the genus Hypercompe.

The following species are recognised in the genus Catenina:

- Catenina castronis (Strand, 1919)
- Catenina hambletoni (Schaus, 1938)
- Catenina heterogena Oberthür, 1881
- Catenina kennedyi (Rothschild, 1910)
- Catenina mus (Oberthür, 1881)
