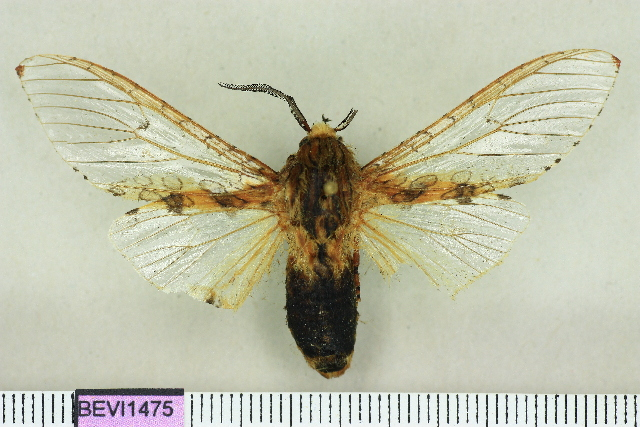

Scientific classification
- Kingdom: Animalia
- Phylum: Arthropoda
- Clade: Pancrustacea
- Class: Insecta
- Order: Lepidoptera
- Superfamily: Noctuoidea
- Family: Erebidae
- Subfamily: Arctiinae
- Genus: Catenina
- Species: C. heterogena

Binomial name
- Catenina heterogena (Oberthür, 1881)

Synonyms
- List: Catenina contexta (Oberthür, 1881); Ecpantheria heterogena Oberthür, 1881; Ecpantheria pellucida Schaus, 1892; Ecpantheria bahiaensis Oberthür, 1881; Ecpantheria boisduvali Oberthür, 1881; Hypercompe contexta (Oberthür, 1881); Hypercompe heterogena (Oberthür, 1881)

= Catenina heterogena =

Species of moth

Catenina heterogena is a species of moth in the family Erebidae. It was first described by Charles Oberthür in 1881 and is found in Brazil.
