= Catenina mus =

Scientific classification
- Kingdom: Animalia
- Phylum: Arthropoda
- Clade: Pancrustacea
- Class: Insecta
- Order: Lepidoptera
- Superfamily: Noctuoidea
- Family: Erebidae
- Subfamily: Arctiinae
- Genus: Catenina
- Species: C. mus

Binomial name
- Catenina mus (Oberthür, 1881)

Synonyms
- Ecpantheria mus Oberthür, 1881; Hypercompe mus (Oberthür, 1881)

Species of moth

Catenina mus is a species of moth in the family Erebidae. It was first described by Charles Oberthür in 1881 and is found in Paraguay and Brazil.
