= Nespolino =

Italian liqueur

Nespolino is an Italian liqueur made from the seeds of the loquat fruit. It has a bitter taste reminiscent of other Italian seed-based bitter liqueurs such as amaretto and nocino, both prepared from nuts and apricot kernels. Both the loquat seeds and the apricot kernels contain cyanogenic glycosides, but the drinks are prepared from varieties that contain only small quantities (such as Mogi and Tanaka), so there is no risk of cyanide poisoning.
