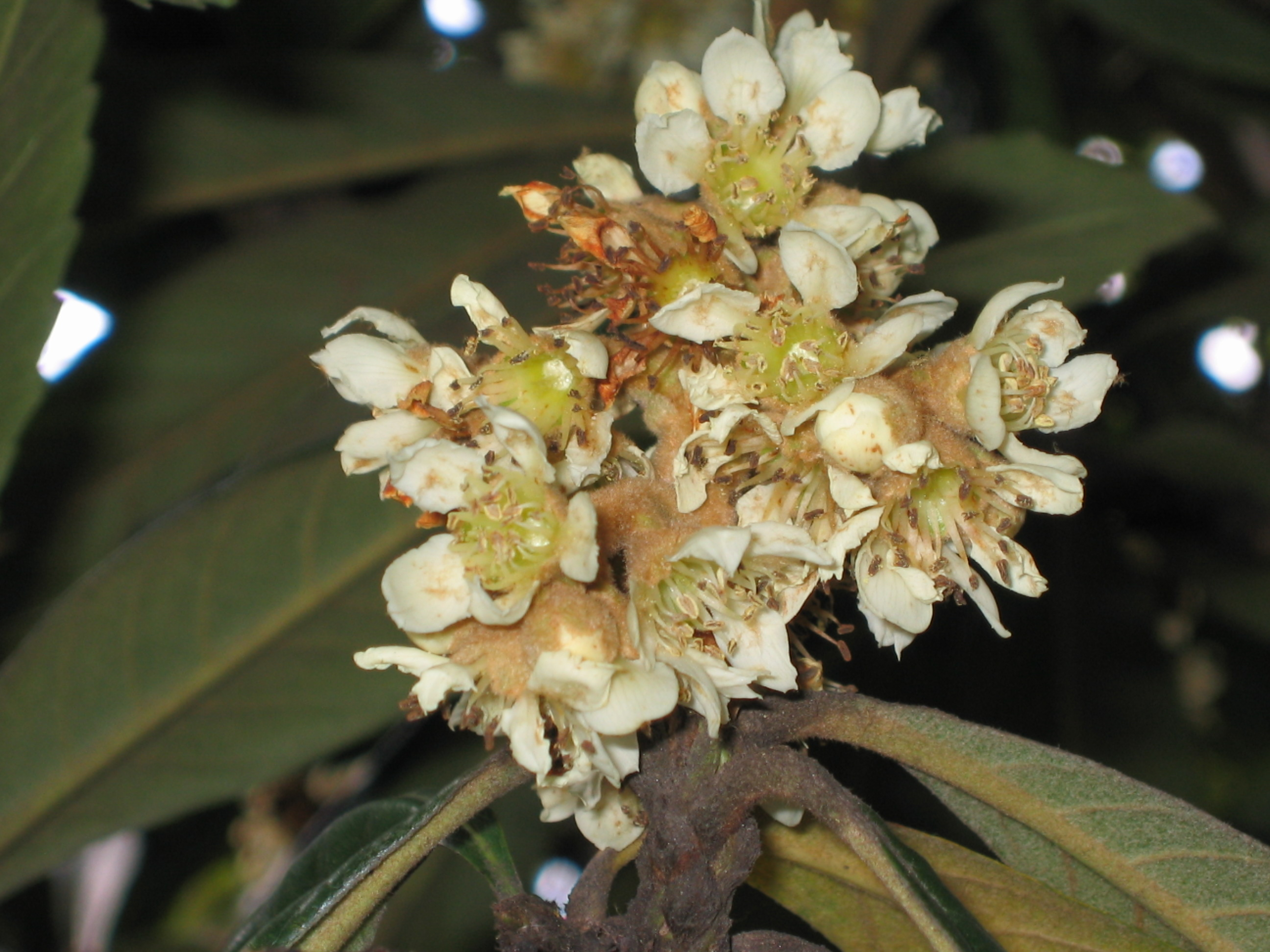

Conservation status
- Least Concern (IUCN 3.1)

Scientific classification
- Kingdom: Plantae
- Clade: Embryophytes
- Clade: Tracheophytes
- Clade: Spermatophytes
- Clade: Angiosperms
- Clade: Eudicots
- Clade: Rosids
- Order: Rosales
- Family: Rosaceae
- Genus: Eriobotrya
- Species: E. bengalensis

Binomial name
- Eriobotrya bengalensis (Roxb.) B.B.Liu & J.Wen

Forms
- Rhaphiolepis bengalensis f. angustifolia (Cardot) B.B.Liu & J.Wen; Rhaphiolepis bengalensis f. bengalensis; Rhaphiolepis bengalensis f. contracta B.B.Liu & J.Wen; Rhaphiolepis bengalensis f. gigantea (J.E.Vidal) B.B.Liu & J.Wen; Rhaphiolepis bengalensis f. intermedia B.B.Liu & J.Wen; Rhaphiolepis bengalensis f. multinervata B.B.Liu & J.Wen

Synonyms
- Rhaphiolepis bengalensis (Roxb.) B.B.Liu & J.Wen; Mespilus bengalensis Roxb.; Photinia bengalensis (Roxb.) Wall. ex G.Don; Pyrus bengalensis (Roxb.) M.F.Fay & Christenh.

= Eriobotrya bengalensis =

Species of flowering plant

Eriobotrya bengalensis is a species of flowering plant in the family Rosaceae. E. bengalensis is a subtropical medium-sized tree, and is found in Asia, including in India at an elevation from 1,000 metres (3,300 ft) to 3,000 metres (9,800 ft). The species is rated least concern on the IUCN red list.
