= Catenina castronis =

Scientific classification
- Kingdom: Animalia
- Phylum: Arthropoda
- Clade: Pancrustacea
- Class: Insecta
- Order: Lepidoptera
- Superfamily: Noctuoidea
- Family: Erebidae
- Subfamily: Arctiinae
- Genus: Catenina
- Species: C. castronis

Binomial name
- Catenina castronis (Strand, 1919)

Synonyms
- Ecpantheria castronis Strand, 1919; Ecpantheria mus brasiliensis Rothschild, 1910; Hypercompe castronis (Strand, 1919)

Species of moth

Catenina castronis is a species of moth in the family Erebidae. It was first described by Embrik Strand in 1919 and is found in Brazil.
