= Eriobotrya balgooyi =

Conservation status
- Vulnerable (IUCN 3.1)

Scientific classification
- Kingdom: Plantae
- Clade: Embryophytes
- Clade: Tracheophytes
- Clade: Spermatophytes
- Clade: Angiosperms
- Clade: Eudicots
- Clade: Rosids
- Order: Rosales
- Family: Rosaceae
- Genus: Eriobotrya
- Species: E. balgooyi

Binomial name
- Eriobotrya balgooyi K.M.Wong & Ent

Synonyms
- Rhaphiolepis balgooyi (K.M.Wong & Ent) B.B.Liu & J.Wen

Species of flowering plant

Eriobotrya balgooyi is a species of flowering plant in the family Rosaceae. It is endemic to Borneo, where it is found on Mount Kinabalu and Mount Tambuyukon in Kinabalu Park of Sabah state in Malaysia.

Eriobotrya balgooyi is a multi-branched shrub, growing 0.5 to 2 meters high. It grows in woody scrub on ultramafic soils between 2,420 and 2,560 meters elevation.
