= Catenina hambletoni =

Scientific classification
- Kingdom: Animalia
- Phylum: Arthropoda
- Clade: Pancrustacea
- Class: Insecta
- Order: Lepidoptera
- Superfamily: Noctuoidea
- Family: Erebidae
- Subfamily: Arctiinae
- Genus: Catenina
- Species: C. hambletoni

Binomial name
- Catenina hambletoni (Schaus, 1938)

Synonyms
- Ecpantheria hambletoni Schaus, 1938; Hypercompe hambletoni (Schaus, 1938)

Species of moth

Catenina hambletoni is a species of moth in the family Erebidae. It was first described by William Schaus in 1938 and is found in Brazil.

Larvae have been recorded feeding on Bidens, Eriobotrya, Gossypium, Hibiscus, Manihot and Ricinus species.
