= Rhaphiolepis × delacourii =

- Close-up of flowers
- At the Jardín Botánico La Concepción

Scientific classification
- Kingdom: Plantae
- Clade: Tracheophytes
- Clade: Angiosperms
- Clade: Eudicots
- Clade: Rosids
- Order: Rosales
- Family: Rosaceae
- Genus: Rhaphiolepis
- Species: R. × delacourii

Binomial name
- Rhaphiolepis × delacourii André

Synonyms
- Pyrus × delacourii (André) M.F.Fay & Christenh.

Hybrid species of plant

Rhaphiolepis × delacourii, the hybrid Indian hawthorn, is an artificial hybrid species of flowering plant in the family Rosaceae. First arising in the late 1800s in Cannes, France, its parents are Rhaphiolepis indica and R. umbellata, both from eastern Asia. A shrub reaching 1.2 m (4 ft), it is valued for its showy pink flowers, is hardy in USDA Zones 8 to 10, and is resistant to drought and coastal salt spray. It and several cultivars are available from commercial nurseries.
