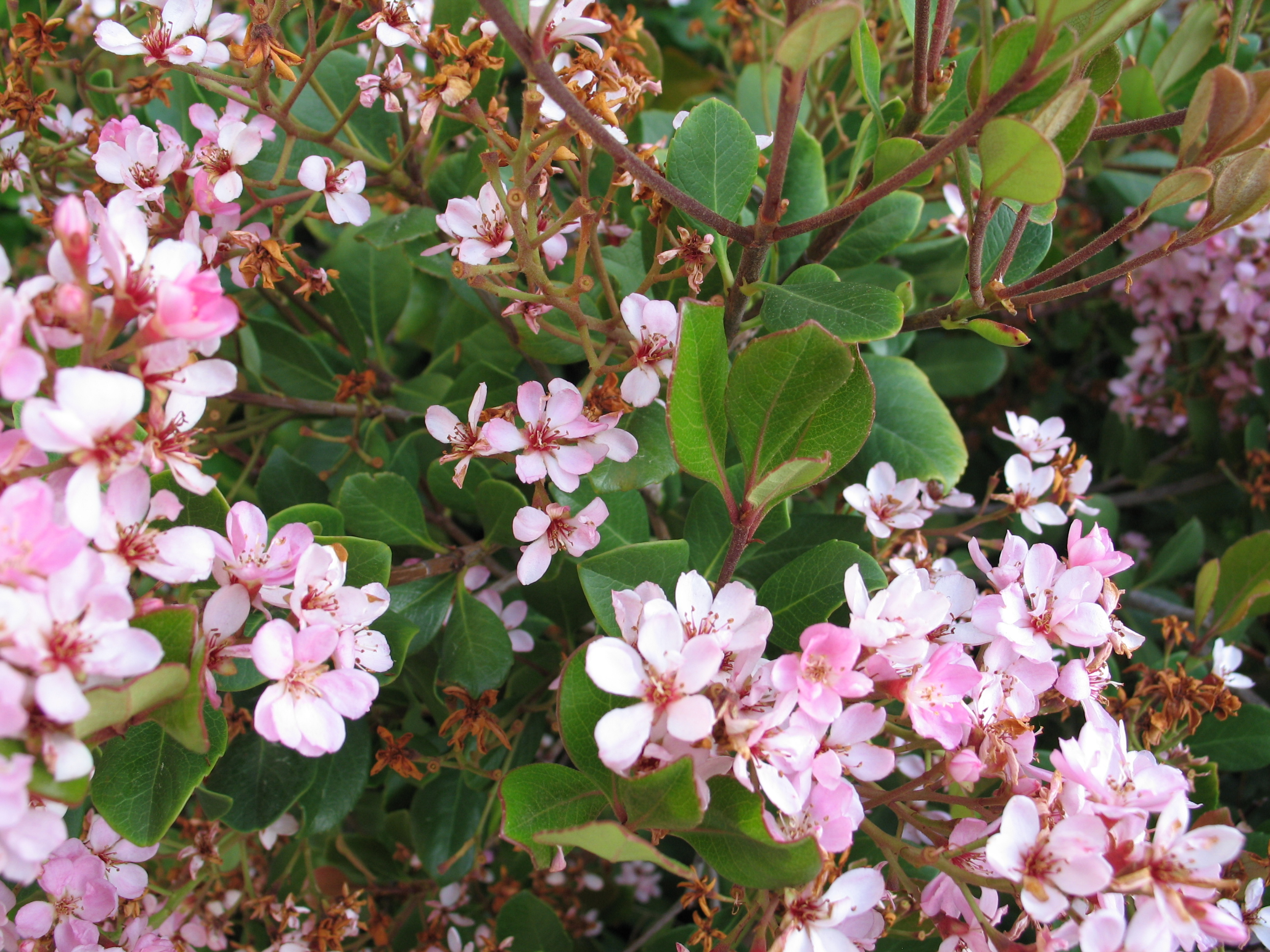
- Rhaphiolepis indica in flower

Scientific classification
- Kingdom: Plantae
- Clade: Tracheophytes
- Clade: Angiosperms
- Clade: Eudicots
- Clade: Rosids
- Order: Rosales
- Family: Rosaceae
- Subfamily: Amygdaloideae
- Tribe: Maleae
- Subtribe: Malinae
- Genus: Rhaphiolepis; Lindl.

Species
- see text

Synonyms
- Opa Lour. (1790); Raphiolepis Lindl. (1820), nom. rejic.

= Rhaphiolepis =

Genus of plants

Rhaphiolepis (/ˌræfiˈɒlɪpɪs/ RAF-ee-OL-ip-iss or /ˌræfioʊˈlɛpɪs/ RAF-ee-oh-LEP-iss) is a genus of about fifteen species of evergreen shrubs and small trees in the family Rosaceae, native to warm temperate and subtropical East Asia and Southeast Asia, from southern Japan, southern Korea and southern China, south to Thailand and Vietnam. In searching literature it is well to remember that the name commonly is misspelt "Raphiolepsis". The genus is closely related to Eriobotrya (loquats), so closely in fact, that members of the two genera have hybridised with each other; for example × Rhaphiobotrya, the "Coppertone loquat", is a hybrid of Eriobotrya deflexa X Rhaphiolepis indica. The common name hawthorn, originally specifically applied to the related genus Crataegus, now also appears in the common names for some Rhaphiolepis species. For example, Rhaphiolepis indica often is called "Indian hawthorn", and Rhaphiolepis umbellata, "Yeddo hawthorn".

== Description ==
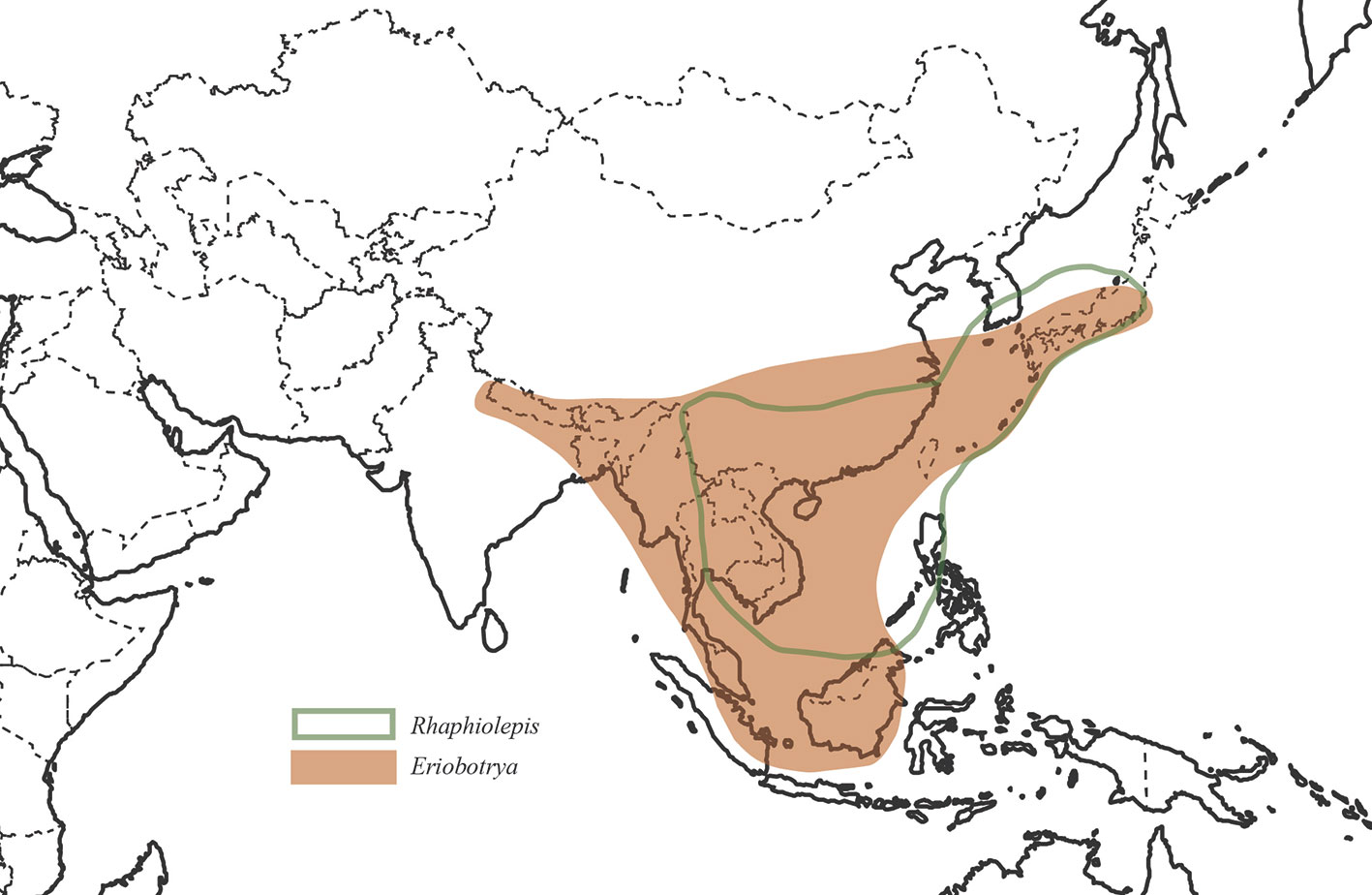
Distribution map of Rhaphiolepis and Eriobotrya

The species vary in size, some only reaching 1–1.5 m (3 ft 3 in – 4 ft 11 in), while R. ferruginea can reach 10 m (33 ft). The leaves are alternate, leathery, glossy dark green, simple, 3–9 cm (1–3 1/2 in) long, with an entire or serrated margin. The flowers are white or pink, 1–2 cm (1/2–3/4 in) diameter, produced in small to large corymbs with panicle structure. The fruit is a small pome 1–2 cm (1/2–3/4 in) diameter, ripening dark purple to black, usually containing only a single seed.

== Taxonomy ==
Rhaphiolepis is closely related to loquats and toyon and is in the apple subtribe along with many other commercially important fruit like pears. Recent phylogenetic research has suggested Rhaphiolepis and Eriobotrya (loquats) be merged. Plants of the World Online treats Eriobotrya as a synonym of Rhaphiolepis.

Research suggests the following phylogenetic relationships:

- 7 species
  Stranvaesia
- 117
  - 43
    - monotypic
      Heteromeles (toyon)
    - 42
      - Rhaphiolepis
      - Eriobotrya (loquats)
  - 74 species
    Pyrus (pears)

== Cultivation and uses ==
The best known species is Rhaphiolepis indica (Indian hawthorn) from southern China, grown for its decorative pink flowers, and popular in bonsai culture. Rhaphiolepis umbellata (Yeddo hawthorn) from Japan and Korea has blunter leaves and white flowers. It is the hardiest species, tolerating temperatures down to about −15 °C (5 °F). They have been hybridized to create Rhaphiolepis × delacourii.

The fruit of some varieties is edible when cooked, and can be used to make jam, but some ornamental varieties bear fruit that is of no culinary value.

Indian Hawthorn is a mainstay horticultural specimen in southern United States. It is often found in commercial as well as in private landscapes. Often it is trimmed into small compact hedges or balls for foundation plants. It has been successfully pruned into a standard form as well as small dwarf-like trees up to 4.5 m (15 ft) in height.

The use of Rhaphiolepis in landscapes in humid regions is limited by the susceptibility of many of its species and hybrids to a disfiguring leaf spot disease caused by fungi in the genus Entomosporium.

== Species ==
12 species are currently recognized, according to Plants of the World Online.

- Rhaphiolepis brevipetiolata J.E.Vidal
- Rhaphiolepis ferruginea F.P.Metcalf
- Rhaphiolepis indica (L.) Lindl. – Indian hawthorn
- Rhaphiolepis integerrima Hook. & Arn.
- Rhaphiolepis jiulongjiangensis P.C.Huang & K.M.Li
- Rhaphiolepis lanceolata Hu
- Rhaphiolepis major Cardot
- Rhaphiolepis oblongifolia (Merr. & Rolfe) B.B.Liu & J.Wen
- Rhaphiolepis philippinensis (S.Vidal) Kalkman
- Rhaphiolepis salicifolia Lindl.
- Rhaphiolepis umbellata (Thunb.) Makino – Yeddo hawthorn
- Rhaphiolepis wuzhishanensis W.B.Liao, R.H.Miau & Q.Fan

== Gallery ==
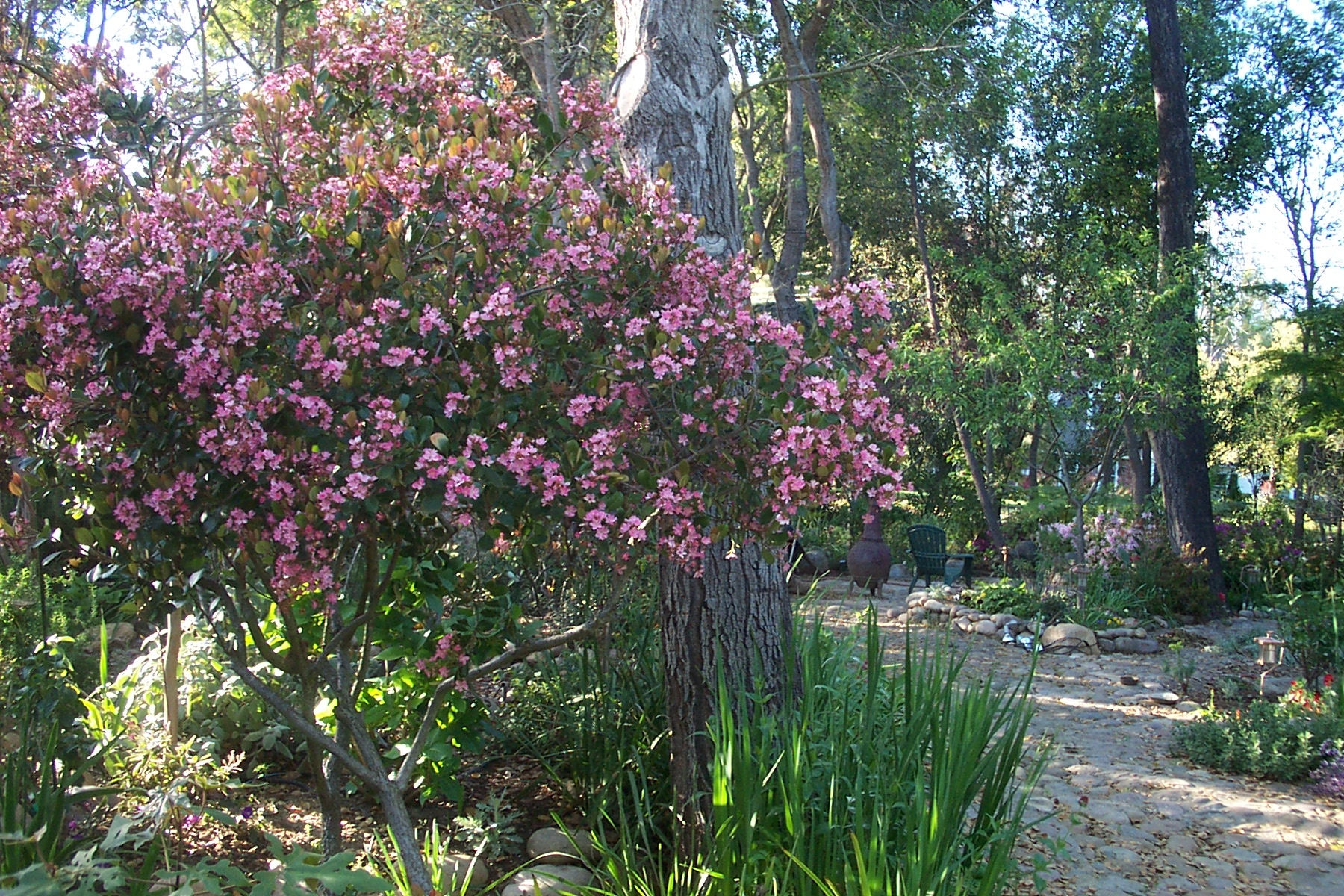
Thirty-year-old Indian hawthorn that has been pruned into a multi-trunked dwarf-like tree

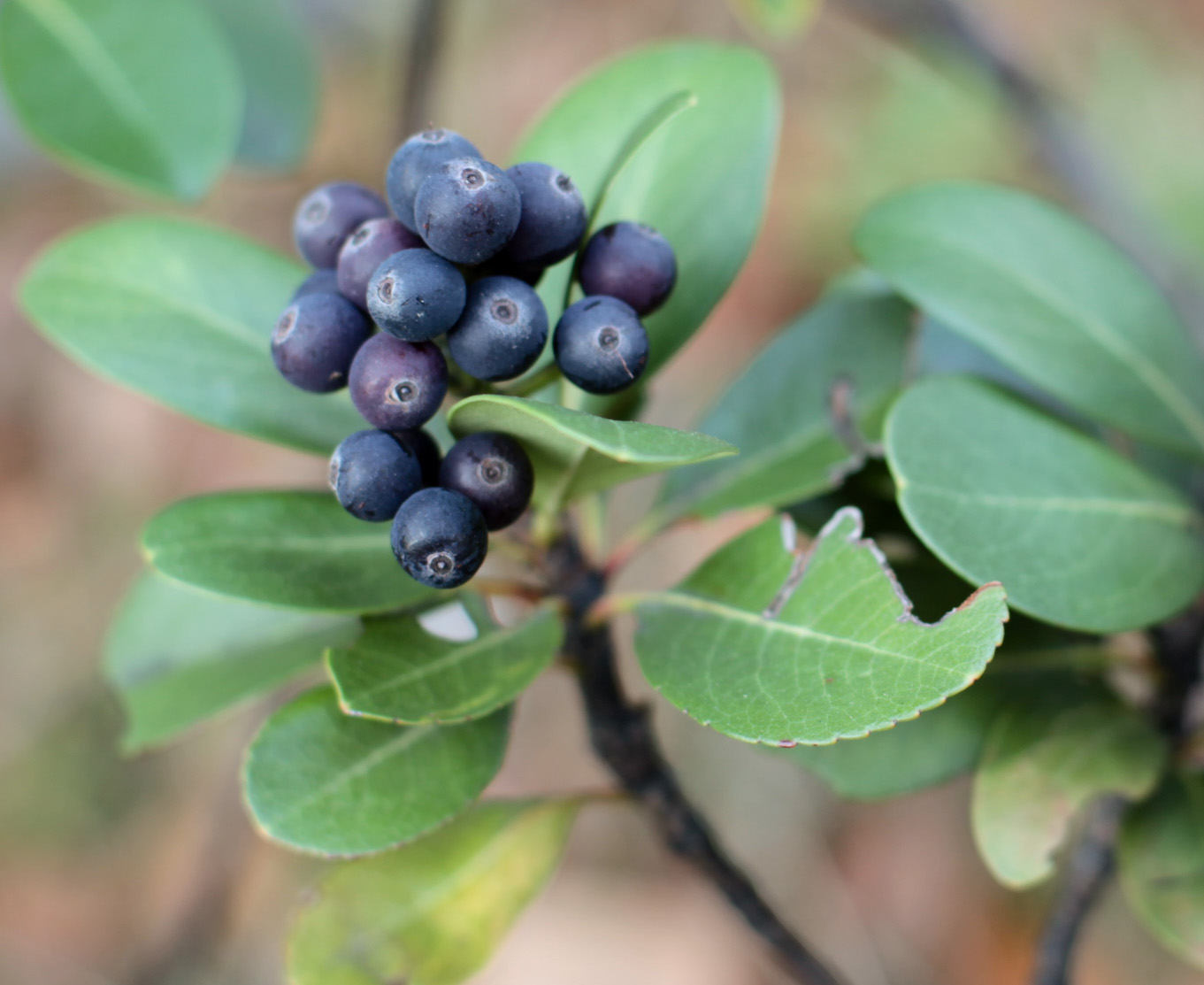
Indian hawthorn fruits

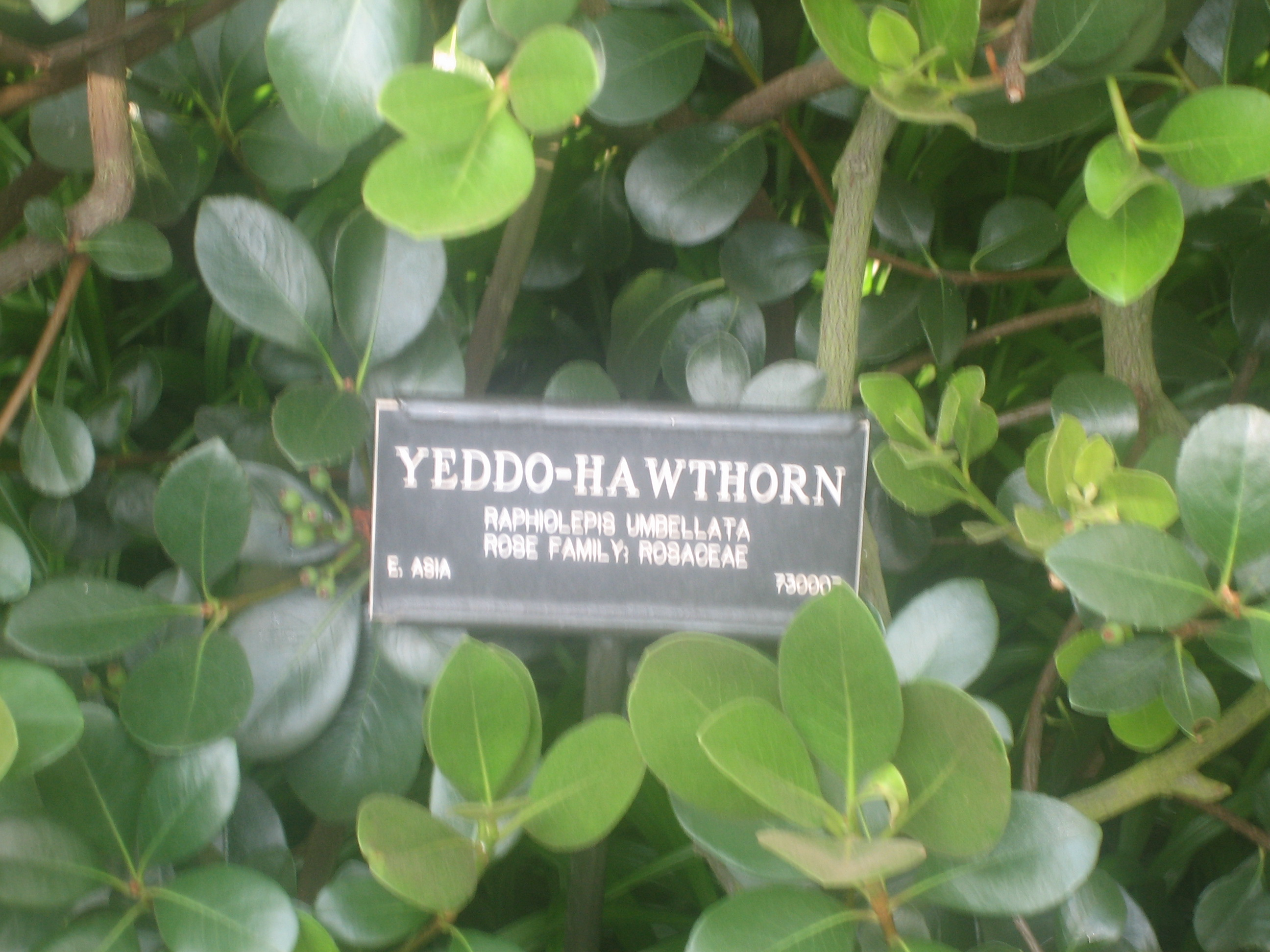
Yeddo-Hawthorn tree at Brooklyn Botanic Garden in New York City
