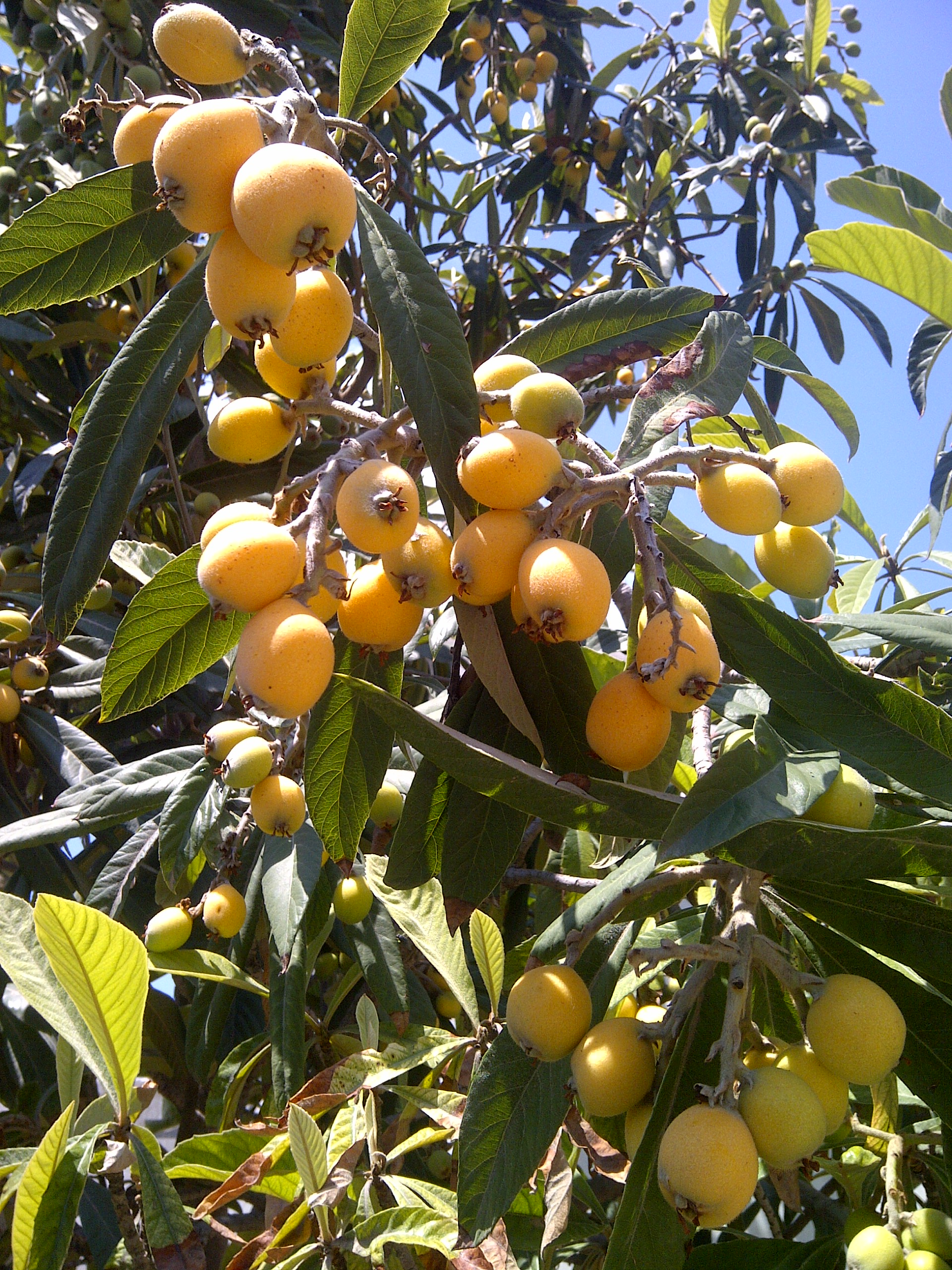
- Loquat leaves and fruits

Scientific classification
- Kingdom: Plantae
- Clade: Tracheophytes
- Clade: Angiosperms
- Clade: Eudicots
- Clade: Rosids
- Order: Rosales
- Family: Rosaceae
- Genus: Eriobotrya
- Species: E. japonica

Binomial name
- Eriobotrya japonica (Thunb.) Lindl.

Synonyms
- Crataegus bibas Lour.; Mespilus japonica Thunb.; Photinia japonica (Thunb.) Benth. & Hook. f. ex Asch. & Schweinf.

= Loquat =

Species of plant

The loquat (Eriobotrya japonica, Chinese: 枇杷; Pinyin: pípá) is a large evergreen shrub or tree grown commercially for its orange-coloured fruits. It is also cultivated as an ornamental plant.

The loquat is a fruit tree in the family Rosaceae, subfamily Amygdaloideae, tribe Maleae. It is native to the cooler hill regions of south-central China. It has been introduced to regions with subtropical to mild temperate climates throughout the world.

Eriobotrya japonica formerly was thought to be closely related to the genus Mespilus and is still sometimes known as the Japanese medlar, which is the name it takes in other European languages, such as níspero japonés in Spanish or nespolo giapponese in Italian. It is also known as Japanese plum and Chinese plum.

== Etymology ==
Loquat

Chinese name
- Traditional Chinese: 蘆橘
- Simplified Chinese: 芦橘
Transcriptions
Standard Mandarin
- Hanyu Pinyin: lújú
- Wade–Giles: lu^{2}-chü^{2}
- IPA: [lǔ.tɕy̌]
Yue: Cantonese
- Yale Romanization: lòuh-gwāt
- Jyutping: lou^{4}-gwat^{1}
- IPA: [lɔw˩ kʷɐt̚˥]

Modern Chinese name
- Chinese: 枇杷
Transcriptions
Standard Mandarin
- Hanyu Pinyin: pípá
- IPA: [pʰǐ.pʰǎ]
Yue: Cantonese
- Jyutping: pei^{4}-paa^{4}
- IPA: [pʰej˩ pʰa˩]

Japanese name
- Kanji: 枇杷
- Kana: ビワ
Transcriptions
- Romanization: biwa

The name loquat derives from Cantonese lou^{4} gwat^{1} (Chinese: 盧橘; pinyin: lújú; lit. 'black orange').

In Louisiana, many refer to loquats as "misbeliefs" (from the Louisiana Creole word for the tree, mísplís) and they grow in the yards of many homes.

== Description ==
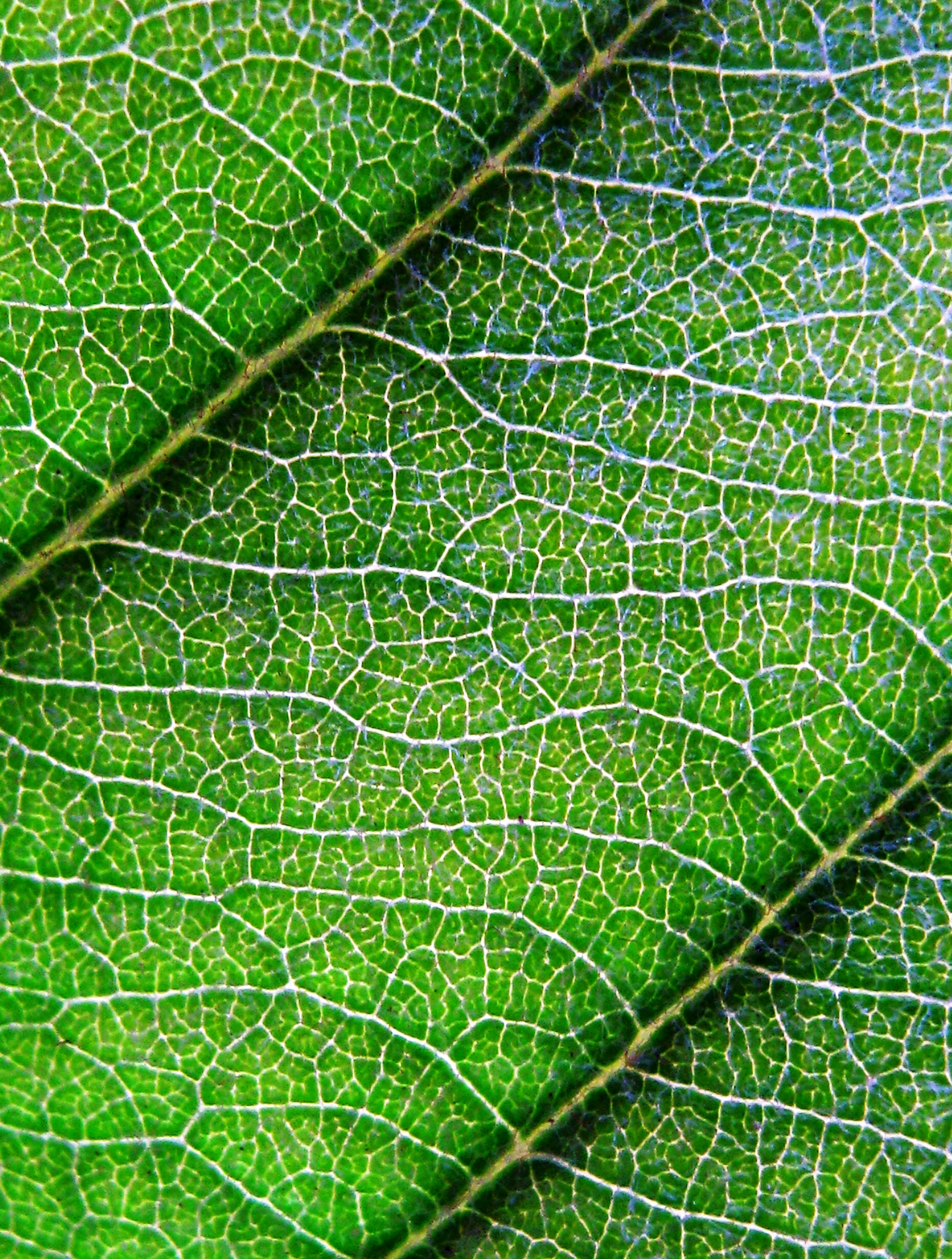
A loquat leaf, shown at a high magnification, illustrating the general appearance of the leaf and the structure of the venation

E. japonica is a large, evergreen shrub or small tree, with a rounded crown, short trunk, and woolly new twigs. The tree generally grows 5–7 m (16–23 ft), but can also reach 10 m (33 ft) when growing in optimal conditions. The fruit begins to ripen during spring to summer, depending on the temperature in the area. The leaves are alternate, simple, 10–25 cm (4–10 in) long, dark green, and tough and leathery in texture, with a serrated margin, and densely velvety-hairy below with thick yellow-brown pubescence; the young leaves are also densely pubescent above, but this soon rubs off.

=== Fruit ===
Loquats are unusual among fruit trees in that the flowers appear in the autumn or early winter, and the fruits are ripe at any time from early spring to early summer. The flowers are 2 cm (3/4 in) in diameter, white, with five petals, and produced in stiff panicles of three to 10 flowers, which have a sweet, heady aroma that can be smelled from a distance.

Loquat fruits, growing in clusters, are oval, rounded, or pear-shaped, 3–5 cm (1 1/8–2 in) long, with a smooth or downy, yellow or orange, sometimes red-blushed skin. The succulent, tangy flesh is white, yellow, or orange and sweet to subacid or acid, depending on the cultivar.

Each fruit contains up to ten ovules, with three to five being the most common. Several ovules mature into large, brown seeds (with different numbers of seeds appearing in each fruit on the same tree, usually between one and four).

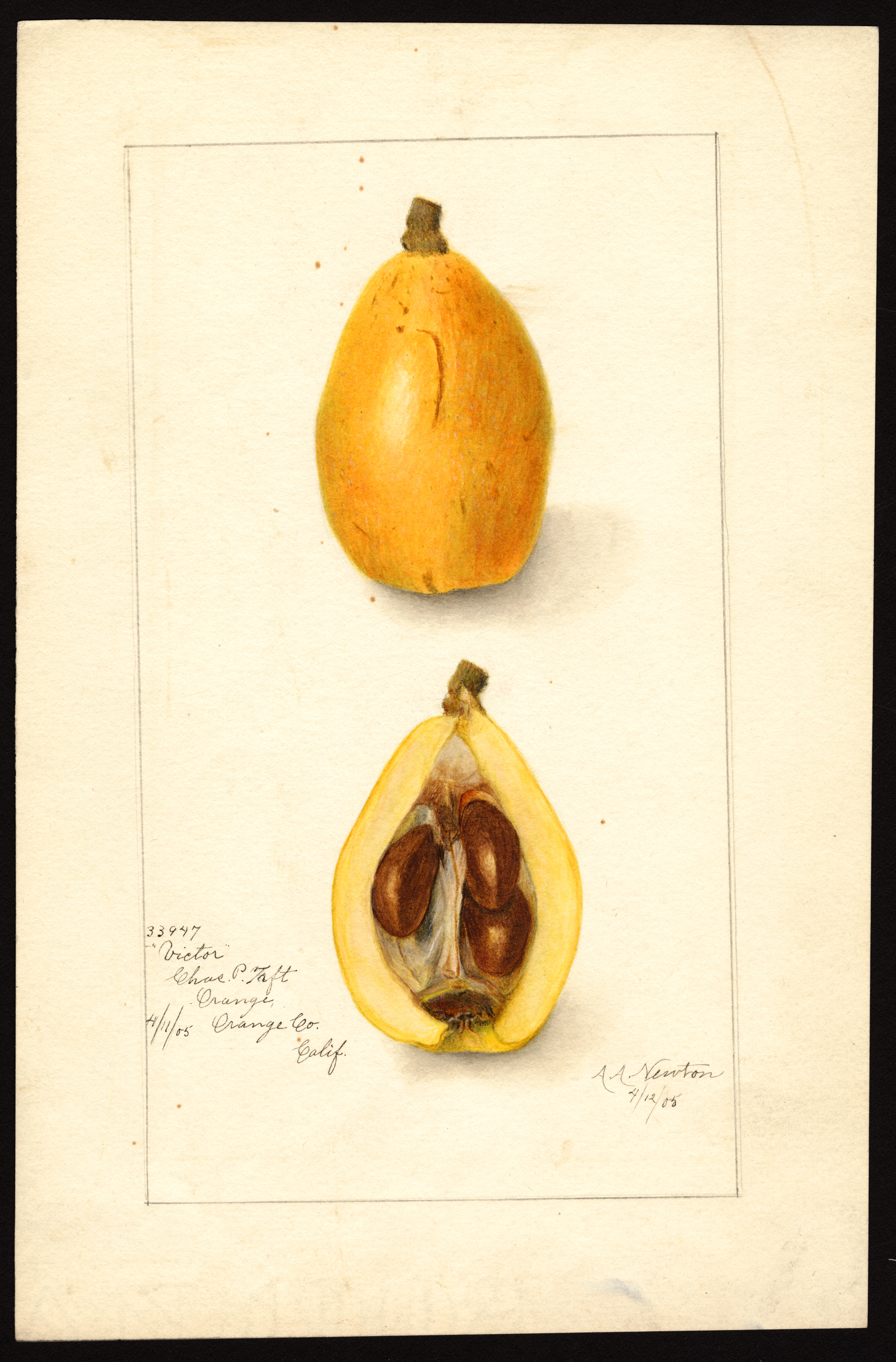
Fruit structure

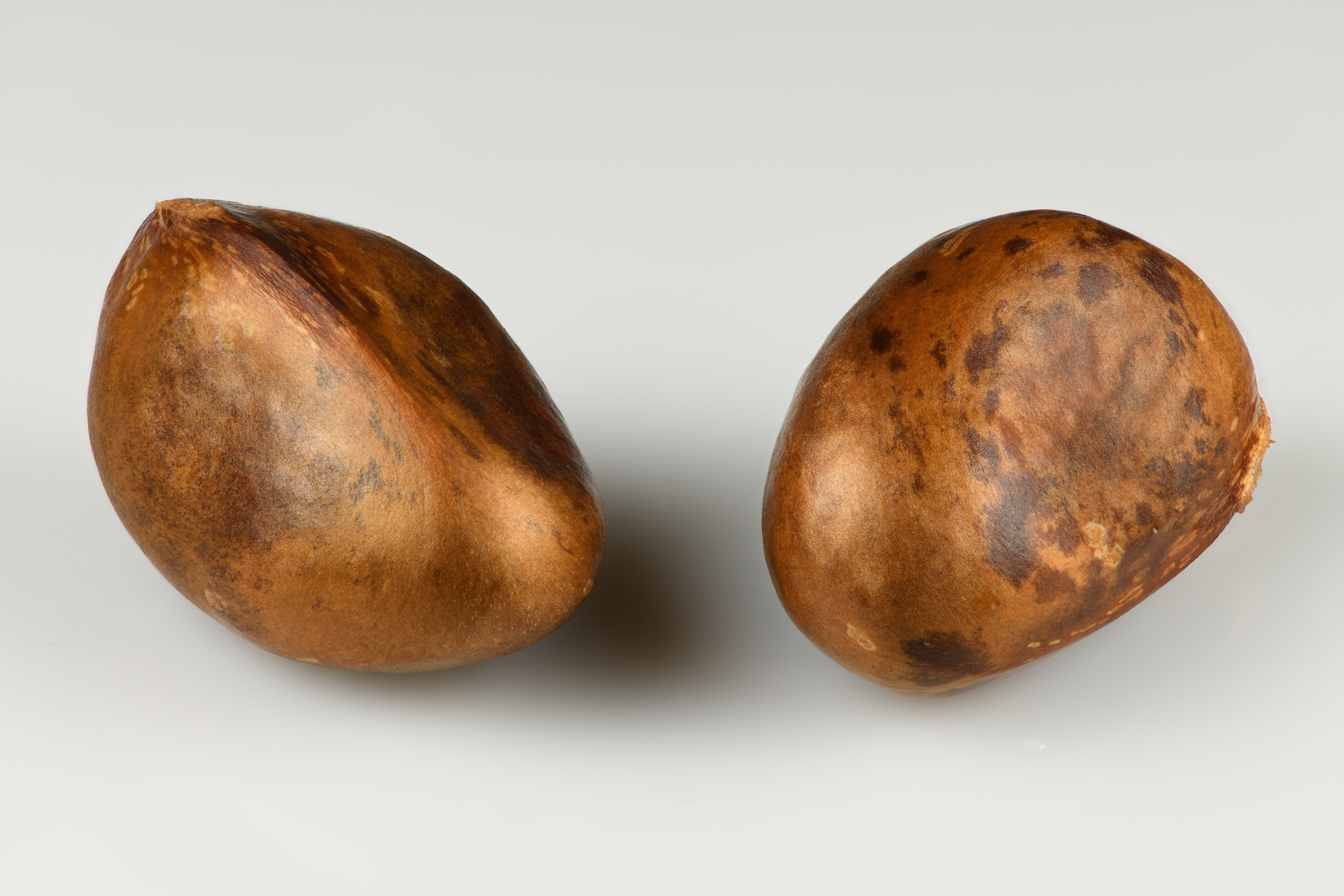
Seeds

Loquats on the fruit tree

== Taxonomy ==
The first European record of the species might have been in the 17th century by Michał Boym, a Polish Jesuit, orientalist, politician, and missionary to China. He described loquat in his Flora sinensis, the first European natural history book about China. The common name for the fruit is from the Portuguese nêspera (from the modified nespilus, originally mespilus, which referred to the medlar), (José Pedro Machado, Dicionário Etimológico da Língua Portuguesa, 1967). Since the first contact of the Portuguese with the Japanese and Chinese dates also from the 16th century, possibly some were brought back to Europe, as was likely the case with other species such as the 'Hachiya' persimmon variety.

E. japonica was again described in Europe by Carl Peter Thunberg, as Mespilus japonica in 1780, and was relocated to the genus Eriobotrya (from Greek εριο, "wool" and βοτρυών, "cluster") by John Lindley, who published these changes in 1821. This fruit is also found in abundance in the northwest Pakistan region.

The largest and sweetest variety is 'Peluche', with fruits weighing about 70 g each and brix around 16, found mainly in Spain.

A famous variety is the late-ripening 'Tanaka', from Portugal, where it is popular in gardens and backyards, but not commercially produced.

Other widely cultivated varieties are 'Algerie', 'Claudia', and 'BRT 20'.

== Distribution and habitat ==
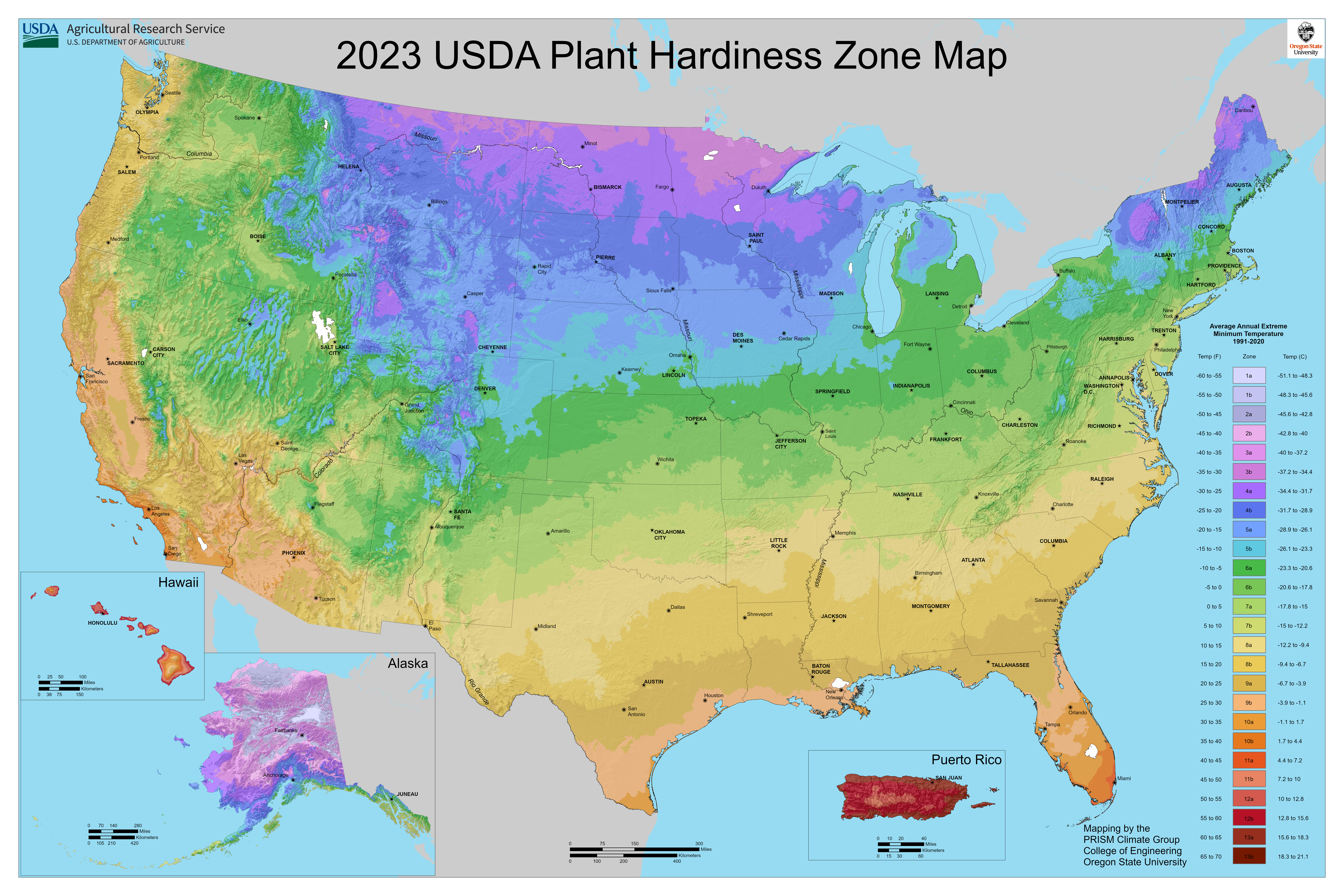
Loquats thrive in places where plant hardiness is rated around 7b/8/9/10a

The plant is originally from China, where related species can be found growing in the wild. It grows in places where suitable winter temperatures are generally above 10°F or -12°C, such as Georgia, Argentina, Armenia, Afghanistan, Australia, Azerbaijan, Bermuda, Brazil, Chile, Colombia, Greece, Kenya, Syria, India, Iran, Iraq, Lebanon, Türkiye, Israel, Palestine, Jordan, South Africa, the whole Mediterranean Basin, Pakistan, New Zealand, Réunion, Tonga, Central America, Mexico, South America and warmer parts of the United States such as Hawaii, California, Texas, Louisiana, Mississippi, Alabama, Florida, Georgia, South Carolina, with a maximal range comprising coastal Oregon and Washington, southern Tennessee, and most of North Carolina, in places with a favorable humid subtropical climate with relatively mild winters.

China is the largest producer worldwide (400,000 t annually), with Spain being the second with 41,487 t annually, half of which is destined for export markets.

== Cultivation ==
=== History ===
The plant has been cultivated in China for over 1,000 years, and Chinese immigrants are presumed to have carried the loquat cultivar to Hawaii and California. It has also been cultivated in Japan for about 1,000 years. The fruits and seeds were brought to Japan by the many Japanese scholars visiting and studying in China during the Tang dynasty.

Over 800 loquat cultivars exist in Asia. Self-fertile variants include the 'Gold Nugget' and 'Mogi' cultivars. The loquat is suited for subtropical to mild temperate climates, and is often grown both as an ornamental plant and as a fruit tree.

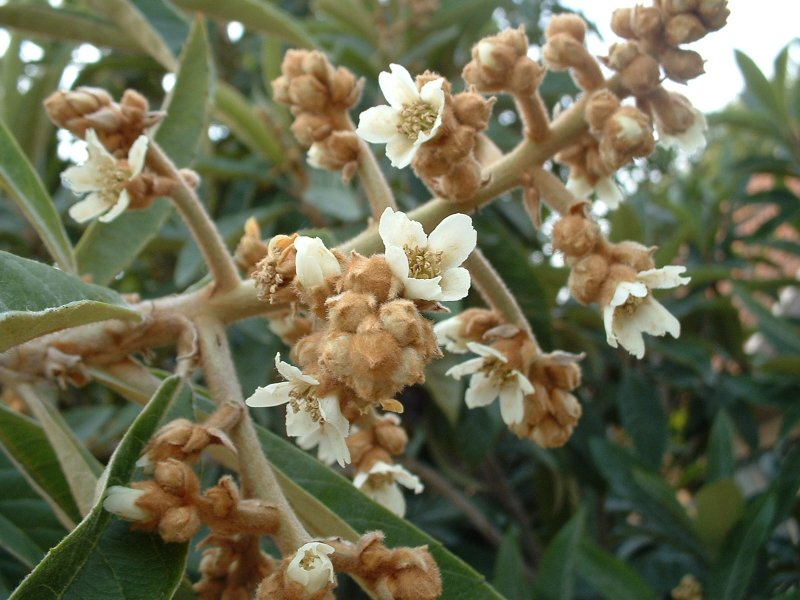
On this cultivar intended for home growing, the flowers open gradually, resulting in the fruit following suit.

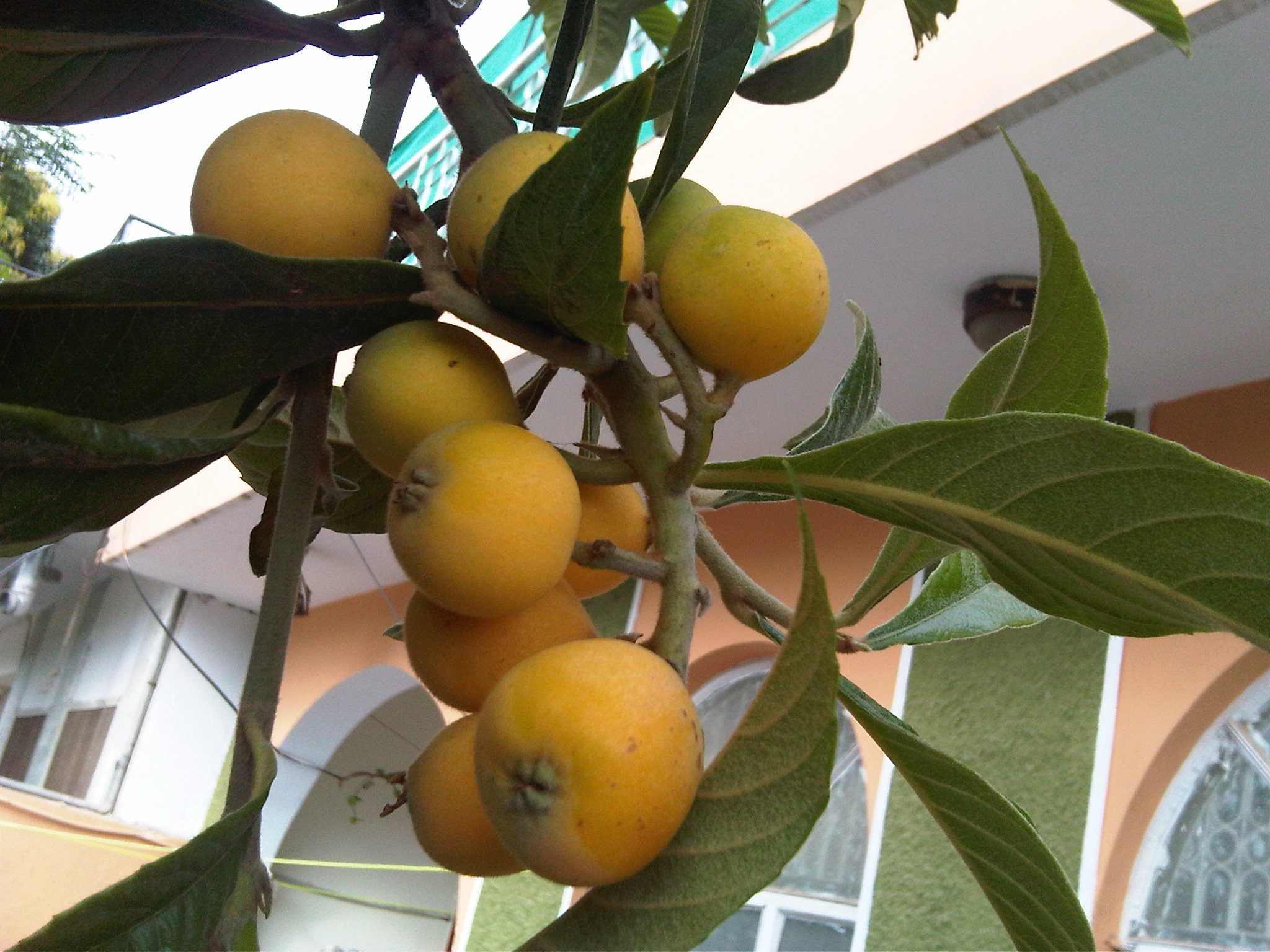
Fruit

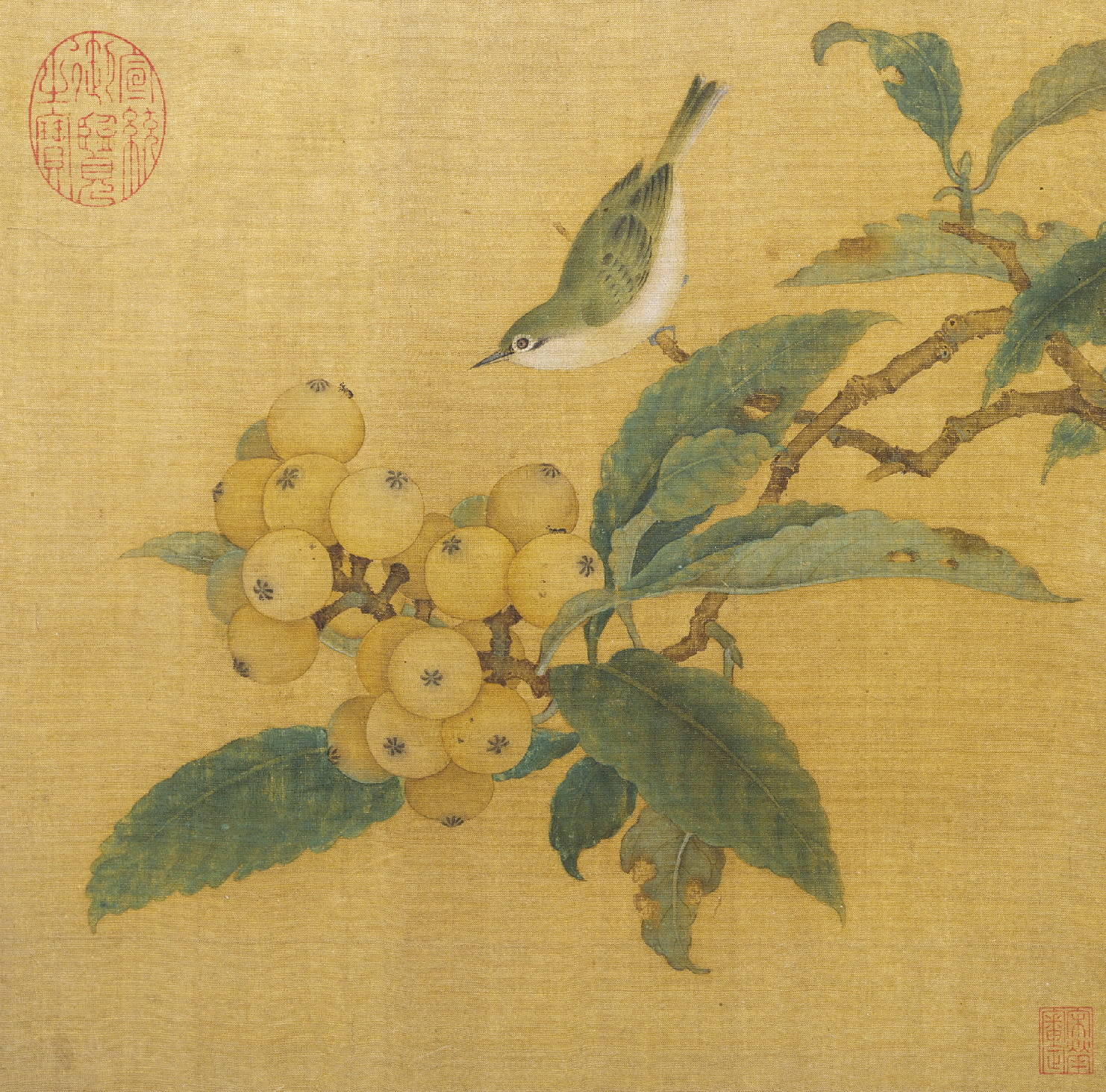
Loquats and a Mountain Bird, Southern Song dynasty (1127–1279)

Many cultivars have orange or white flesh. Some cultivars are intended for home growing, where the flowers open gradually, thus the fruit also ripen gradually, compared to the commercially grown species where the flowers open almost simultaneously, and the whole tree's fruit also ripen together.

China is the biggest producer of loquat in the world, more than five times the production of the second-largest producer, Spain, followed by Pakistan and Turkey. In Europe, Spain is the main producer of loquat.

In temperate climates, it is grown as an ornamental plant with winter protection, as the fruits seldom ripen to an edible state. In the United Kingdom, it has gained the Royal Horticultural Society's Award of Garden Merit.

In the United States, the loquat tree is hardy in USDA zones 8 and above, even surviving in zones 7a and 7b in a suitable humid subtropical climate with relatively mild winters, such as in the US states of Tennessee, South Carolina, North Carolina, coastal Oregon, and Washington, north to the border with Canada and south-eastern Vancouver Island. The loquat flowers only where winter temperatures do not fall below 30 °F or −1 °C. In such areas, the tree flowers in autumn and the fruit ripens in late winter. It is popular in the Southeastern United States and temperate West Coast regions. One distinction that sets the loquat apart from other fruit trees is that its fruit becomes available in late April – early May, around a time many other fruits are not ready for harvest.

Loquat trees have been reported to survive temperatures as cold as −11 °C (12 °F) for short periods of time, and in some cases even surviving through lows of −14 °C (6 °F) in places like Tennessee, South Carolina, and North Carolina, with leaves growing back on the tree during the warmer months after the freeze. The loquat grows poorly above USDA zone 10a, generally not thriving when temperatures stay above 40 °C (104 °F) for many consecutive days in a dry environment (e.g. most desertic parts of Arizona).

Loquats grow at an altitude of 900 to 2,000 m (3,000 to 7,000 ft). The right altitude varies depending on the temperature or how close it is to the equator. For this reason, higher altitudes in China or the Andes Mountains make excellent cultivating spots.

China is a major country where loquats grow natively and wild in forests around the mountains. Loquats are cultivated on around 120,000 hectares (300,000 acres) with hundreds of different varieties.

In Russia, the loquat tree produces fruit in subtropical and near-subtropical areas (Gelendzhik, Sochi). It also produces fruit in subtropical areas of Georgia.

In Canada, it can be found growing in Vancouver, on the south-eastern coast of the island near the cities of Victoria and Sidney, and coastal south-western British Columbia, with a modified Mediterranean climate of cool summers and relatively mild winters. More frost-resistant varieties grow and produce fruit in Sidney, British Columbia, though not every year.

Loquat grows differently in tropical climates, typically blooming two or three times a year and maturing 90 days after the bloom.

== Uses ==
=== Nutrition ===
Loquats, raw
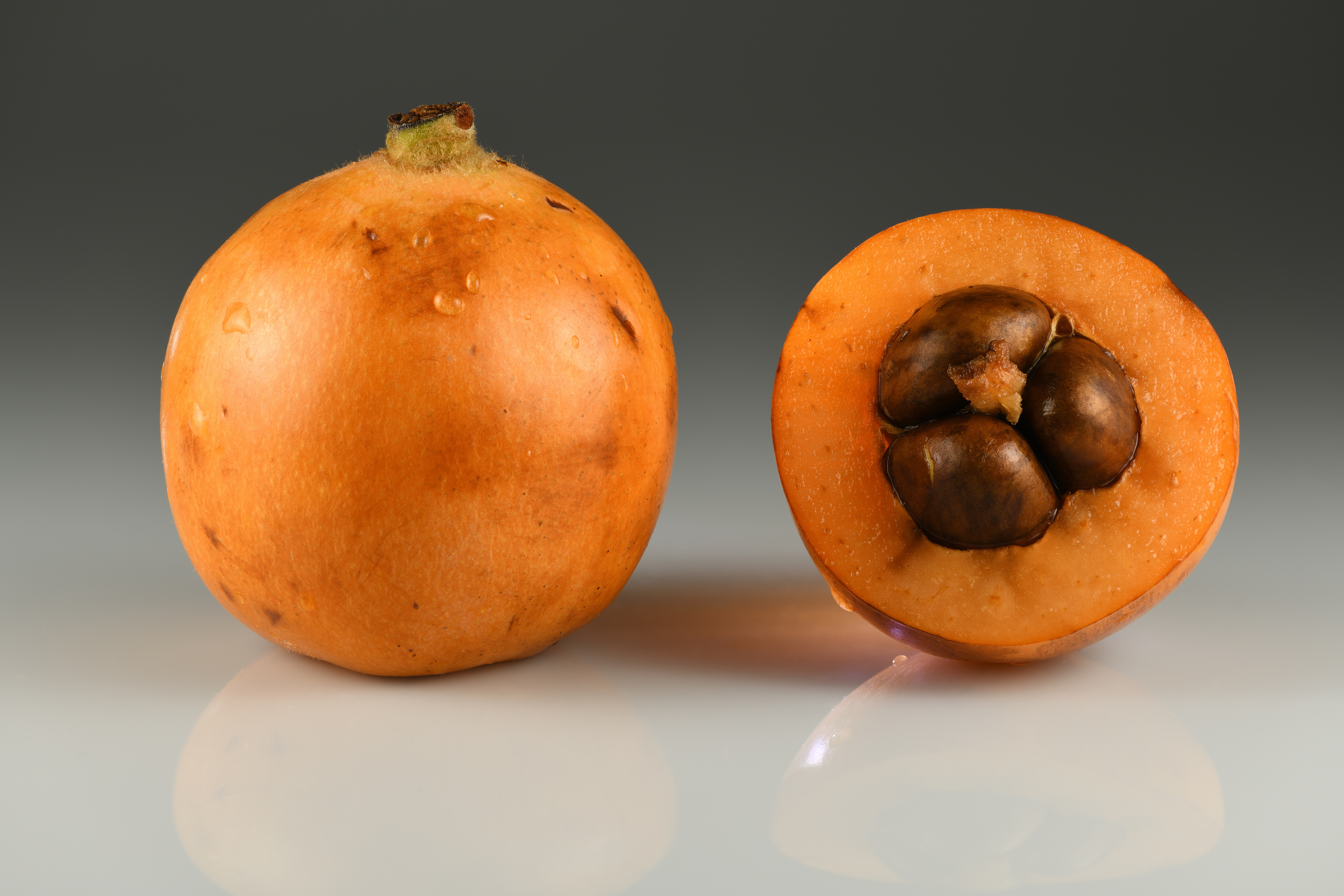

Nutritional value per 100 g (3.5 oz)
- Energy: 197 kJ (47 kcal)
- Carbohydrates: 12.14 g
- Dietary fiber: 1.7 g
- Fat: 0.2 g
- Protein: 0.43 g
Vitamins and minerals
Vitamins	Quantity %DV^{†}
Vitamin A equiv.	8% 76 μg
Thiamine (B1)	2% 0.019 mg
Riboflavin (B2)	2% 0.024 mg
Niacin (B3)	1% 0.18 mg
Vitamin B6	6% 0.1 mg
Folate (B9)	4% 14 μg
Vitamin C	1% 1 mg
Minerals	Quantity %DV^{†}
Calcium	1% 16 mg
Iron	2% 0.28 mg
Magnesium	3% 13 mg
Manganese	6% 0.148 mg
Phosphorus	2% 27 mg
Potassium	9% 266 mg
Sodium	0% 1 mg
Zinc	0% 0.05 mg
- Link to USDA Database entry
- ^{†}Percentages estimated using US recommendations for adults, except for potassium, which is estimated based on expert recommendation from the National Academies.

The loquat is low in sodium and high in vitamin A, vitamin B_{6}, dietary fiber, potassium, and manganese.

Like most related plants, the seeds (pips) and young leaves of the plant are slightly poisonous, containing small amounts of cyanogenic glycosides (including amygdalin) which release cyanide when digested, though the low concentration and bitter flavour normally prevent enough being eaten to cause harm.

=== Culinary ===
The loquat has high sugar, acid, and pectin contents. It is eaten as a fresh fruit and mixes well with other fruits in fresh fruit salads or fruit cups. The fruit is also commonly used to make jam, jelly, and chutney, and is often served poached in light syrup. Firm, slightly immature fruits are best for making pies or tarts, while the fruits are the sweetest when soft and orange. The fruit is sometimes canned or processed into confections. The waste ratio is 30% or more, due to the seed size.

The loquat can also be used in juices or smoothies. In South American countries such as Ecuador, the loquat can be used for batidos, where they are mixed with milk, ice, or other fruits.

An American writer calls the loquat's flavor "floral" with hints of apricot and peach, with the fruit's natural sweetness contributing to its popularity.

Loquats are used commonly as a natural sweetener for many different types of food and are used to make marmalade and jelly in various locales. Many people use loquats to create sauces and other juices, since the acidity goes well with the sweetness, another reason why they are popular for making pies and other pastries.

Loquats are often eaten as a fresh fruit, but need to have the seeds removed to be ready to eat. The seeds not only take up a great deal of space relative to the size of the fruit (cf. avocado), but also are slightly poisonous in large quantities. The fruit is often peeled, but the peel is edible and not overly thick.

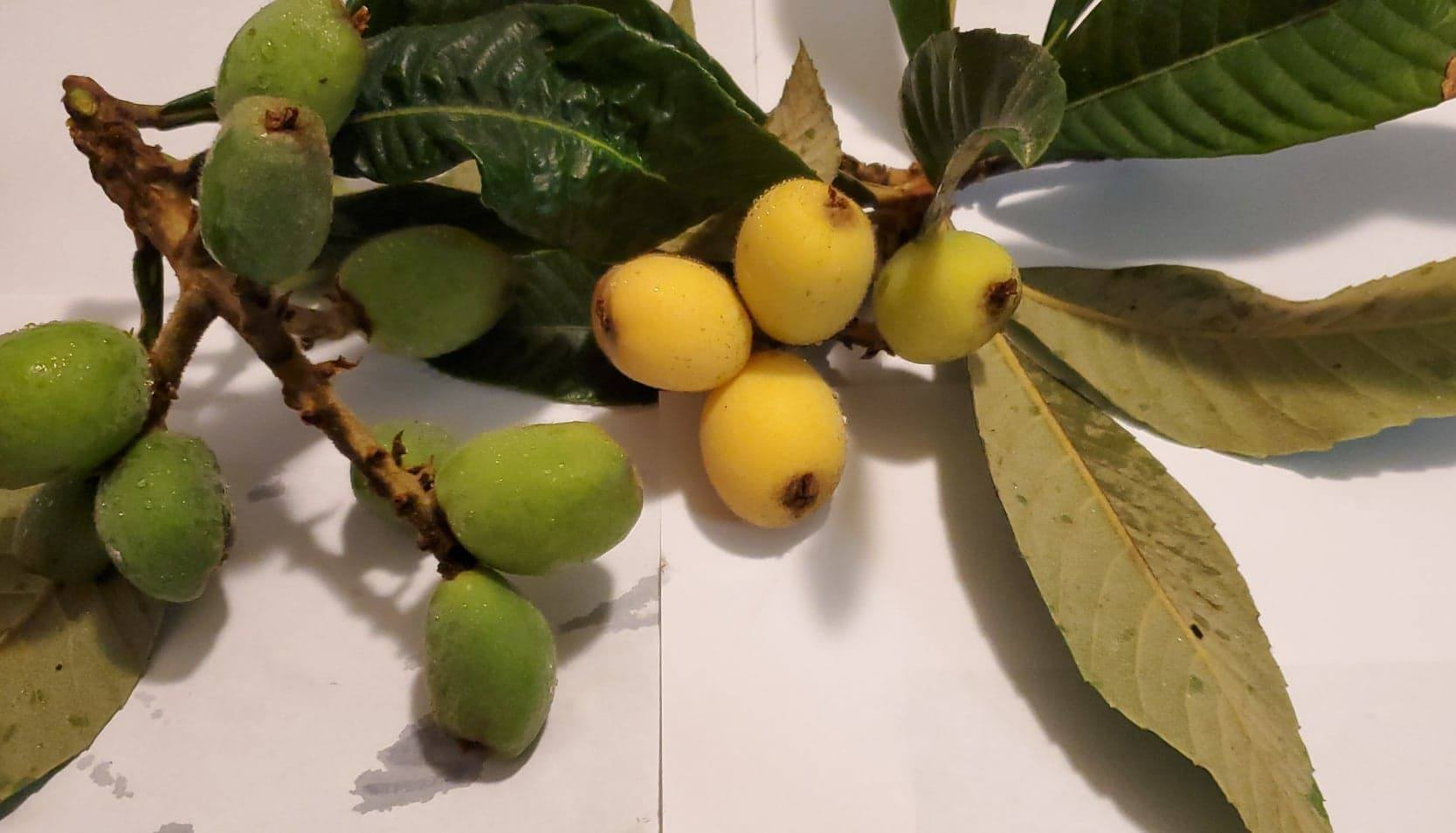
Ripe and unripe loquats

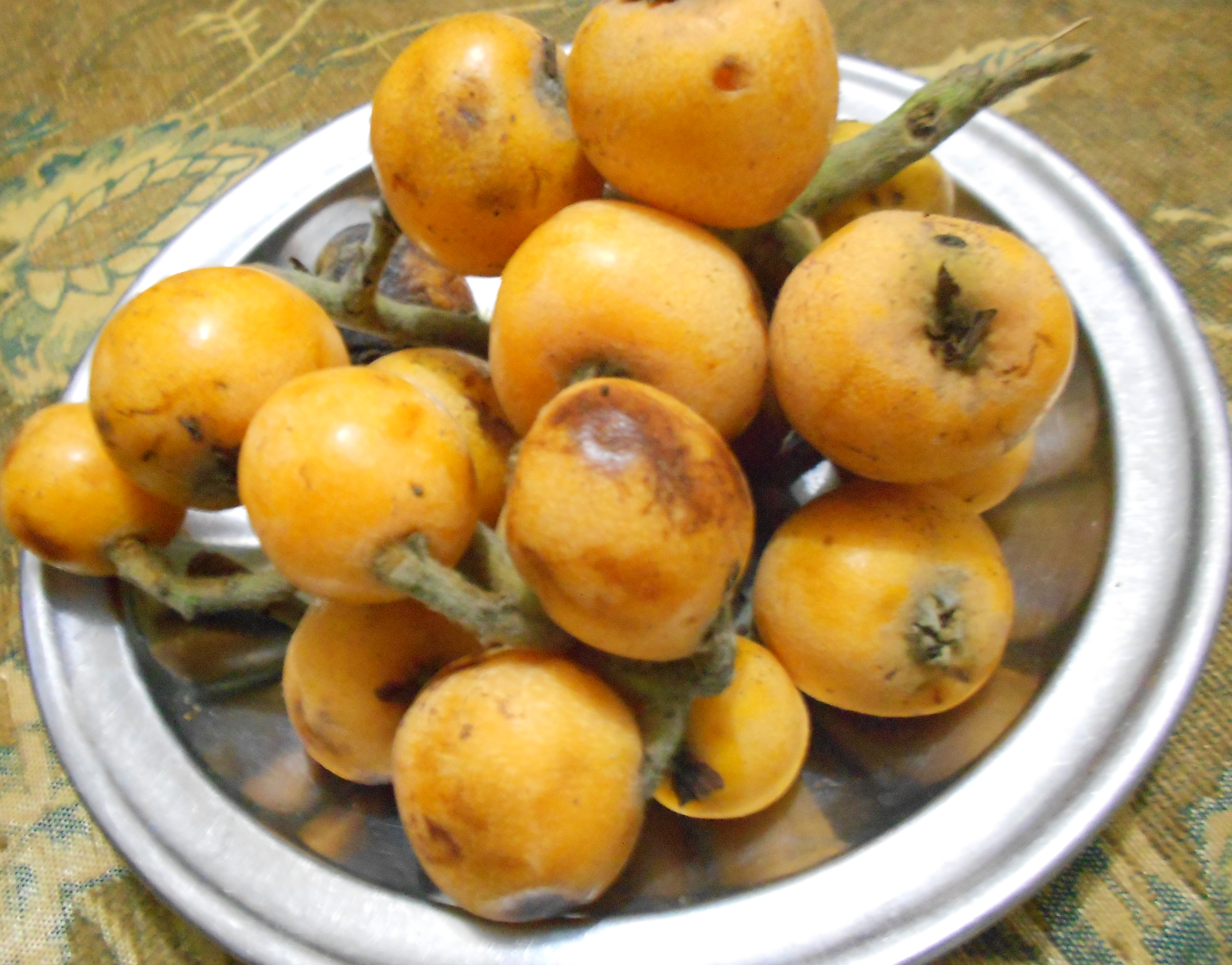
Loquat on plate

==== Alcoholic beverages ====
Loquats can also be used to make light wine. They can be fermented into a fruit wine using crystal sugar and white liquor, or using sugar and yeast.

The liquor nespolino is made from the seeds, reminiscent of nocino and amaretto, both prepared from nuts and apricot kernels. Both the loquat seeds and the apricot kernels contain cyanogenic glycosides, but the drinks are prepared from varieties that contain only small quantities (such as 'Mogi' and 'Tanaka'), so the risk of cyanide poisoning is minimal.

=== Other uses ===
Some other uses for loquat include making animal feed and medicine to counter vomiting and thirst. The loquat's wood is used as an alternative to pear wood and works well to make rulers and other writing instruments. The loquat's flowers are used to make perfume in Europe, although its yield is considered low. Powdered loquat leaves are also used to treat diarrhea and depression and to help counteract alcoholic intoxication.

== In culture ==
The loquat was often mentioned in medieval Chinese literature, such as the poems of Li Bai.

Through golden colour, the pipa represents gold and wealth in China. One of the fruits is often placed in the ornamental bowls containing other fruits and vegetables (such as spring onions, artemisia leaves, pomegranates, kumquats, etc.) which are used to symbolise auspicious wishes or the Five Prosperities or wurui (五瑞).
