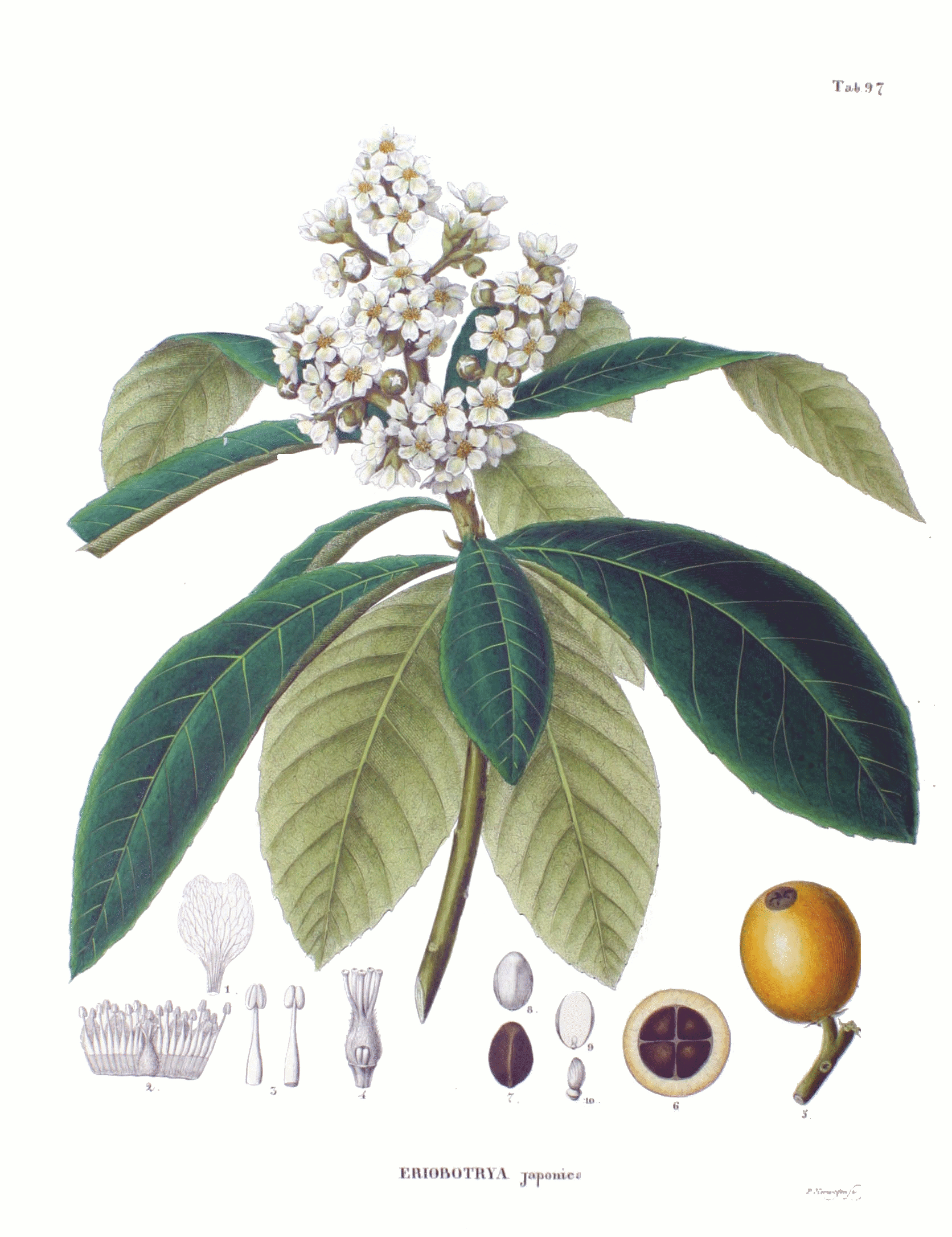
- Eriobotrya japonica

Scientific classification
- Kingdom: Plantae
- Clade: Embryophytes
- Clade: Tracheophytes
- Clade: Spermatophytes
- Clade: Angiosperms
- Clade: Eudicots
- Clade: Rosids
- Order: Rosales
- Family: Rosaceae
- Subfamily: Amygdaloideae
- Tribe: Maleae
- Subtribe: Malinae
- Genus: Eriobotrya; Lindl.

Type species
- Eriobotrya japonica

Species
- See text

= Eriobotrya =

Genus of trees

Eriobotrya is a genus of flowering plants, mostly large evergreen shrubs and small trees, in the family Rosaceae, native to woodland in the Himalayas and East Asia. The loquat, E. japonica, is grown for its edible fruit.

Eriobotrya species are used as food plants by the larvae of some Lepidoptera species including Hypercompe hambletoni.

== Species ==
Image	Scientific name	Common name	Distribution
	Eriobotrya angustissima Hook. f.		Assam, Vietnam
	Eriobotrya averyanovii Idrees & J.M.H.Shaw		Laos
	Eriobotrya balgooyi K.M.Wong & Ent		Sabah
A cluster of whitish flowers in a tree	Eriobotrya bengalensis Hook. f.		India, Thailand, Laos, Cambodia, Vietnam, Myanmar, China (Guizhou and Yunnan)
	Eriobotrya capitata Aver.		Laos
Preserved specimen of Eriobotrya cavaleriei, consisting of stems with rounded green leaves, and brownish inflorescences	Eriobotrya cavaleriei (H. Lév.) Rehder		China and Vietnam
	Eriobotrya condaoensis X.F.Gao, Idrees & T.V.Do		South-east Vietnam
	Eriobotrya crassifolia Q.Fan, S.F.Chen & K.K.Meng		China (Yunnan)
	Eriobotrya × daduheensis H.Z.Zhang ex W.B.Liao, Q.Fan & M.Y.Ding		China (Sichuan)
A tree with red and green leaves, and white flowers	Eriobotrya deflexa (Hemsl.) Nakai	Bronze Loquat	China, Taiwan and Vietnam
	Eriobotrya dubia Decne.		India, Bhutan and Nepal
	Eriobotrya elliptica Lindl.		Nepal, China (Xizang) and Vietnam
	Eriobotrya fragrans Champ. ex Benth.		China and Vietnam
	Eriobotrya fusca K.C.Kuan ex X.F.Gao & Idrees		China (Yunnan)
	Eriobotrya henryi Nakai		Myanmar, China (Guizhou and Yunnan) and Vietnam
	Eriobotrya hongiaoensis Yahara & Tagane		Vietnam
	Eriobotrya hookeriana Decne.		Sikkim, Bhutan and Nepal
Round yellow fruits growing on a tree	Eriobotrya japonica (Thunb.) Lindl.	Loquat	Japan, China and Vietnam
	Eriobotrya kwangsiensis Chun ex X.H.Yang & S.Q.Lin		China
	Eriobotrya laoshanica W.B.Liao, Q.Fan & S.F.Chen		China
	Eriobotrya latifolia Hook.f.		Myanmar
	Eriobotrya longifolia (Decne.) Hook.f.		Arunachal Pradesh
	Eriobotrya macrocarpa Kurz		Myanmar
	Eriobotrya malipoensis K.C.Kuan		China (Yunnan)
	Eriobotrya merguiensis J.E.Vidal		Myanmar
	Eriobotrya obovata W.W. Sm.		China (Yunnan)
	Eriobotrya petiolata Hook. f.		Bhutan and Sikkim
	Eriobotrya platyphylla Merr.		Myanmar
	Eriobotrya poilanei J.E.Vidal		Vietnam
	Eriobotrya prinoides Rehder & E. H. Wilson		China (Sichuan and Yunnan) and Laos
	Eriobotrya salwinensis Hand.-Mazz.		China (Yunnan), India, Myanmar
	Eriobotrya seguinii (H. Lév.) Cardot ex Guill.		China (Guizhou and Yunnan) and Vietnam
	Eriobotrya serrata J.E. Vidal		China (Guangxi, Yunnan), Laos and Vietnam
	Eriobotrya shanense D.H.Kang, H.G.Ong & Y.D.Kim		Myanmar
	Eriobotrya stipularis Craib		Thailand to Cambodia
	Eriobotrya tengyuehensi W.W. Sm.		China (Yunnan), Myanmar
	Eriobotrya tsiangii Idrees & J.M.H.Shaw		China (Yunnan)
