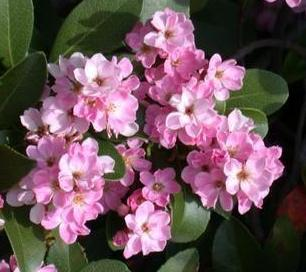
- Indian hawthorn in bloom

Conservation status
- Least Concern (IUCN 3.1)

Scientific classification
- Kingdom: Plantae
- Clade: Tracheophytes
- Clade: Angiosperms
- Clade: Eudicots
- Clade: Rosids
- Order: Rosales
- Family: Rosaceae
- Genus: Rhaphiolepis
- Species: R. indica

Binomial name
- Rhaphiolepis indica (L.) Lindl. ex Ker Gawl.

= Rhaphiolepis indica =

Species of shrub

Rhaphiolepis indica, the Indian hawthorn, India hawthorn or Hong Kong hawthorn is an evergreen shrub in the family Rosaceae.

== Description ==
They are shrubs or small trees, which rarely reach a size of 4 m in height. The branches are purple brown when young, greyish brown when old, cylindrical, initially brown tomentose, glabrous in old age. Petiole 0.5–1.8 cm or almost absent, slightly brown or tomentose, subglabrous; stipules deciduous, lanceolate, little brown tomentose, acuminate apex; ovate blade blade, oblong, rarely obovate, oblong-lanceolate, narrowly elliptical or elliptical-lanceolate, (2–) 4–8 × 1.5–4 cm, coriaceous, abaxially prominent veins, abaxially visible reticular veins and visible or non-adaxially, back pale, glabrous or scarcely tomentose, shiny adaxially, glabrous, the apex obtuse, acute acuminate.

The inflorescences in panicles or terminal of clusters, with many or few flowers; pedicels and peduncles rusty-tomentose; bracts and deciduous bracteoles. Flowers 1–1.5 cm in diameter. The petals white or pink, obovate or lanceolate, 5–7 × 4–5 mm, pubescent basal, obtuse apex. Stamens 15, as long or shorter than the petals.

== Range ==
It is found on slopes, roadsides, bushes on the sides of streams; at an altitude of 700–1600 meters above sea level in an areas such as, southern China, Japan, Laos, Cambodia, Thailand and Vietnam.

== Cultivation and uses ==
It is grown for its decorative pink or white flowers, and is popular in bonsai culture. The fruit is edible when cooked, and can be used to make jam.

Indian hawthorn is a mainstay horticultural specimen in southern United States. It is often found in commercial as well as in private landscapes. Often it is trimmed into small compact hedges or balls for foundation plants. It has been successfully pruned into a standard form as well as small dwarf-like trees up to 15 feet in height. It is apt to develop leaf spot.

=== Dyeing ===
The plant is also known as "teechigi" and its pulp is known as "sharinbai" (しゃりんばい / テーチ木 / テカチ木) in Japan and a dark brown dye is made by boiling its dried bark or root and using iron or lime water as a mordant. This plant has been used in Japan for over 400 years in a technique for making pongo silk fabrics. In the Kainan islands in China it is used to make shima-tsumugi textiles and some fishing nets. Additionally, the plant is used in a Japanese mud dyeing technique known as dorozome from the Amami Islands. In dorozome, branches are chopped into small chips and simmered in large cauldrons for two days. The pulp is then filtered out and yarn is steeped in the golden-orange extract. The more the yarn is dipped and dried, the darker and richer the color is.

== Gallery ==
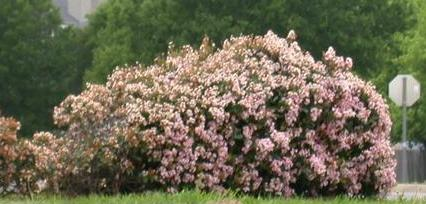
An Indian hawthorn bush at a distance

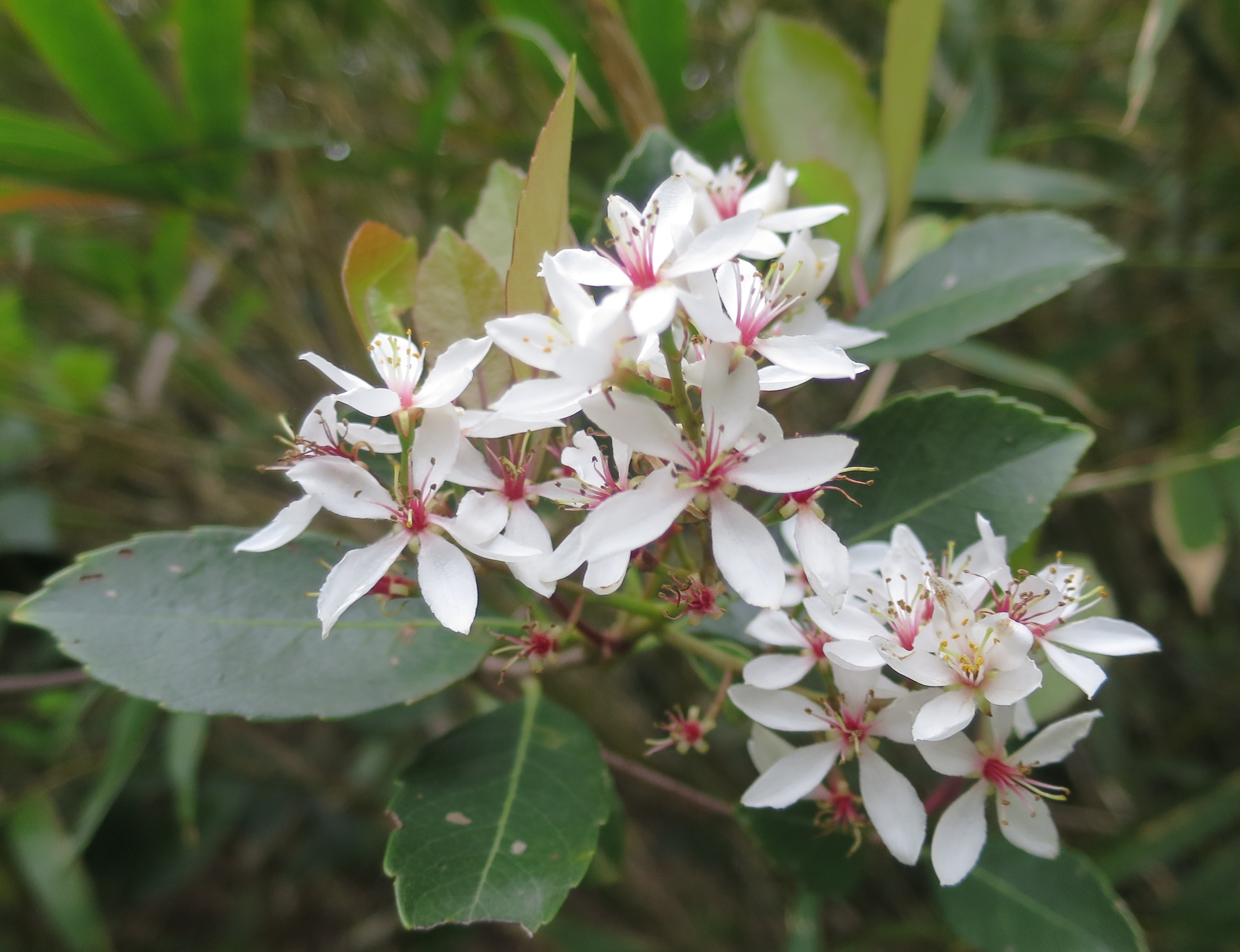
Rhaphiolepis indica blooming in Hong Kong

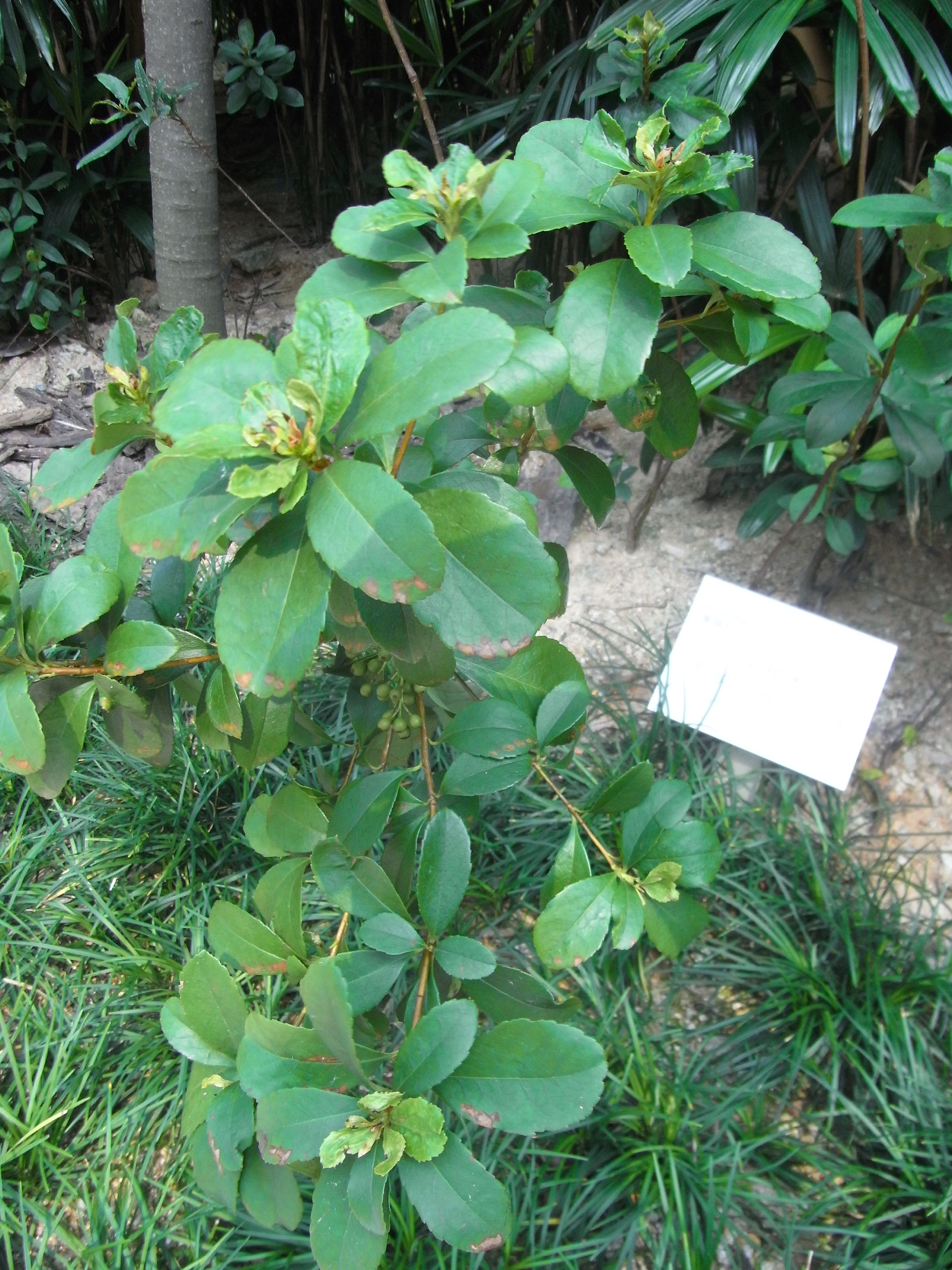
Specimen in Hong Kong

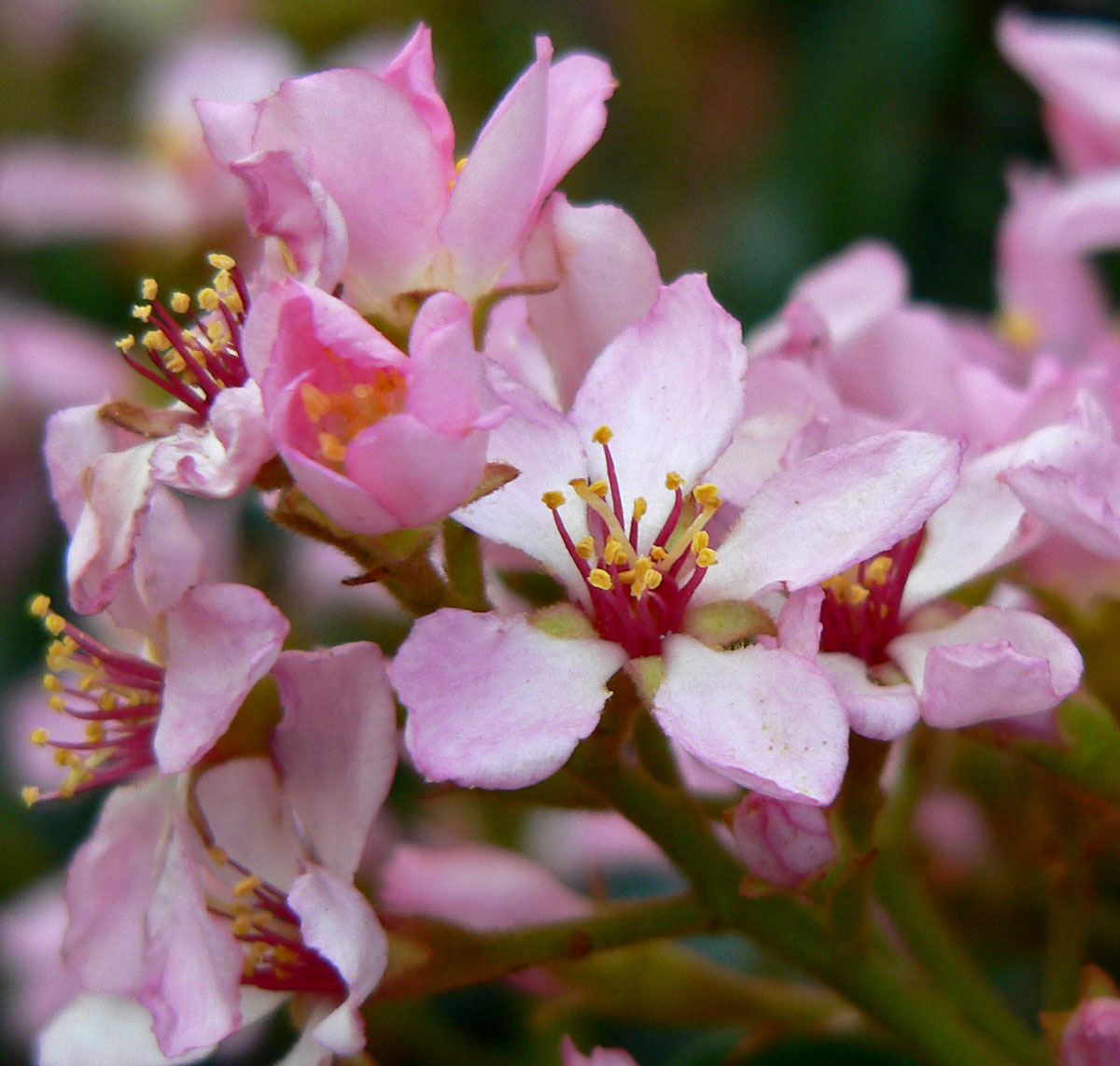
In Las Vegas
