= List of Verbesina species =

The following species in the flowering plant genus Verbesina, often known as crownbeards, are accepted by Plants of the World Online. Although the genus originated in North America, the greatest diversity is now found in South America.

== A ==
- Verbesina abietifolia Rzed. & Calderón
- Verbesina abscondita Klatt
- Verbesina acapulcensis B.L.Rob. & Greenm.
- Verbesina acuminata DC.
- Verbesina agricolarum Standl. & Steyerm.
- Verbesina alata L.
- Verbesina albissima Sagást.
- Verbesina alcabrerae Rzed.
- Verbesina aligera S.F.Blake
- Verbesina allophylla S.F.Blake
- Verbesina alternifolia (L.) Britton ex Kearney
- Verbesina altipetens S.F.Blake
- Verbesina ampliatifolia Sagást. & Quip.
- Verbesina ancashensis Sagást. & Quip.
- Verbesina angulata Urb.
- Verbesina angusta Maguire, Steyerm. & Wurdack
- Verbesina angustifolia S.F.Blake
- Verbesina angustissima S.F.Blake
- Verbesina apiculata J.R.Coleman
- Verbesina apleura S.F.Blake
- Verbesina aramberrana B.L.Turner
- Verbesina arborea Kunth
- Verbesina aristata A.Heller
- Verbesina aspera S.F.Blake
- Verbesina auriculata DC.
- Verbesina auriculigera S.F.Blake
- Verbesina aurita Phil.
- Verbesina ayabacensis Sagást.
- Verbesina aypatensis Sagást. & Quip.

== B ==
- Verbesina baccharidea S.F.Blake
- Verbesina baccharifolia Mattf.
- Verbesina badilloi Panero
- Verbesina barclayae H.Rob.
- Verbesina barragana Cuatrec.
- Verbesina barrancae Harker & N.Jiménez
- Verbesina baruensis Hammel & D'Arcy
- Verbesina benderi Perkins
- Verbesina bipinnatifida Baker
- Verbesina biserrata H.Rob. & Panero
- Verbesina blakeana Steyerm.
- Verbesina bolanosana B.L.Turner
- Verbesina boliviana Klatt
- Verbesina brachypoda S.F.Blake
- Verbesina breedlovei B.L.Turner
- Verbesina brevilingua Sagást.
- Verbesina brunnea Sagást. & Quip.

== C ==
- Verbesina cabrerae Sagást.
- Verbesina cajamarcensis Sagást.
- Verbesina calciphila Standl. & Steyerm.
- Verbesina caleifolia Cabrera
- Verbesina callacatensis Hieron.
- Verbesina callilepis S.F.Blake
- Verbesina calzadae Panero & Villaseñor
- Verbesina capituliparva Sagást.
- Verbesina caracasana B.L.Rob. & Greenm.
- Verbesina carangolensis Olsen
- Verbesina carranzae P.Carrillo
- Verbesina caymanensis Proctor
- Verbesina centroboyacana S.Díaz
- Verbesina chachapoyensis Sagást. & Quip.
- Verbesina chapmanii J.R.Coleman
- Verbesina chiapensis B.L.Rob. & Greenm.
- Verbesina chihuahuensis A.Gray
- Verbesina chilapana B.L.Turner
- Verbesina cinerea Rusby
- Verbesina citrina Sagást. & Zapata
- Verbesina clarkiae H.Rob. & Panero
- Verbesina claussenii Sch.Bip. ex Baker
- Verbesina coahuilensis A.Gray ex S.Watson
- Verbesina columbiana B.L.Rob.
- Verbesina contumacensis Sagást.
- Verbesina corral-diazii B.L.Turner
- Verbesina coulteri A.Gray
- Verbesina crassicaulis S.F.Blake
- Verbesina crassicephala Sagást. & Quip.
- Verbesina crassipes B.L.Rob. & Greenm.
- Verbesina crassiramea S.F.Blake
- Verbesina crocata (Cav.) Less.
- Verbesina cronquistii B.L.Turner
- Verbesina cuautlensis McVaugh
- Verbesina culminicola McVaugh
- Verbesina cumingii Sch.Bip.
- Verbesina curatella McVaugh
- Verbesina cymbipalea S.F.Blake

== D ==
- Verbesina daviesiae B.L.Turner
- Verbesina densifolia S.F.Blake
- Verbesina dentata Kunth
- Verbesina dilloniana Sagást.
- Verbesina diluta V.M.Badillo
- Verbesina dissita A.Gray
- Verbesina diversifolia DC.
- Verbesina domingensis Urb.
- Verbesina durangensis B.L.Turner

== E ==
- Verbesina ecuatoriana Sagást.
- Verbesina eggersii Hieron.
- Verbesina ekmanii Urb.
- Verbesina elegans Kunth
- Verbesina elgalloana B.L.Turner
- Verbesina encelioides (Cav.) Benth. & Hook.f. ex A.Gray
- Verbesina eperetma S.F.Blake
- Verbesina erosa Brandegee
- Verbesina etlana B.L.Turner

== F ==
- Verbesina fastigiata B.L.Rob. & Greenm.
- Verbesina fayi B.L.Turner
- Verbesina felgeri B.L.Turner
- Verbesina flavovirens R.E.Fr.
- Verbesina floribunda Gardner
- Verbesina fraseri Hemsl.
- Verbesina furfuracea McVaugh
- Verbesina fuscasiccans (D'Arcy) D'Arcy
- Verbesina fuscicaulis Sagást.
- Verbesina fusiformis McVaugh

== G ==
- Verbesina gentryi Standl.
- Verbesina gigantea Jacq.
- Verbesina glabrata Hook. & Arn.
- Verbesina glaucophylla S.F.Blake
- Verbesina gracilipes B.L.Rob.
- Verbesina grandifolia S.F.Blake
- Verbesina grandis S.F.Blake
- Verbesina grayi Benth. & Hook.f. ex Hemsl.
- Verbesina guadeloupensis Urb.
- Verbesina guaranitica Chodat
- Verbesina guatemalensis B.L.Rob. & Greenm.
- Verbesina guerreroana B.L.Turner
- Verbesina guianensis Baker

== H ==
- Verbesina harlingii H.Rob.
- Verbesina hastata Kellogg ex Curran
- Verbesina hastifolia S.F.Blake
- Verbesina helianthoides Michx.
- Verbesina heterophylla A.Gray
- Verbesina hexantha Sagást.
- Verbesina hidalgoana B.L.Turner
- Verbesina hintoniorum B.L.Turner
- Verbesina hispida McVaugh
- Verbesina holwayi B.L.Rob.
- Verbesina howardiana Olsen
- Verbesina huancabambae Sagást. & Quip.
- Verbesina huaranchaliana Sagást.
- Verbesina humboldtii Spreng.
- Verbesina hygrophila Panero & Villaseñor
- Verbesina hypargyrea B.L.Rob. & Greenm.
- Verbesina hypoglauca Sch.Bip. ex Klatt
- Verbesina hypomalaca B.L.Rob. & Greenm.
- Verbesina hypsela B.L.Rob.

== I – J ==
- Verbesina intermissa S.F.Blake
- Verbesina jacksonii B.L.Turner
- Verbesina jelskii Hieron.
- Verbesina jimrobbinsii B.L.Turner
- Verbesina juxtlahuacensis Panero & Villaseñor

== K ==
- Verbesina karsticola Proctor
- Verbesina killipii S.F.Blake
- Verbesina kimii B.L.Turner
- Verbesina kingii H.Rob.
- Verbesina klattii B.L.Rob. & Greenm.

== L ==
- Verbesina laevifolia S.F.Blake
- Verbesina laevis S.F.Blake
- Verbesina lanata B.L.Rob. & Greenm.
- Verbesina langfordiae B.L.Turner
- Verbesina langlassei B.L.Rob.
- Verbesina lanulosa Villarreal & A.E.Estrada
- Verbesina lapazii Panero
- Verbesina latisquama S.F.Blake
- Verbesina lehmannii Hieron.
- Verbesina leivae Sagást. & Quip.
- Verbesina leprosa Klatt
- Verbesina leptochaeta A.Gray
- Verbesina leucactinota B.L.Rob.
- Verbesina liebmannii Sch.Bip. ex Klatt
- Verbesina ligulata (Maguire & Wurdack) Pruski
- Verbesina lilloi S.F.Blake
- Verbesina lindheimeri B.L.Rob. & Greenm.
- Verbesina linearis (McVaugh) B.L.Turner
- Verbesina lloensis Hieron.
- Verbesina longifolia A.Gray
- Verbesina longipes Hemsl.
- Verbesina lopez-mirandae Sagást.
- Verbesina lottiana B.L.Turner & J.L.Olsen
- Verbesina luetzelburgii Mattf.
- Verbesina luisana Brandegee
- Verbesina lundellii S.F.Blake

== M ==
- Verbesina macbridei S.F.Blake
- Verbesina macdonaldii B.L.Turner
- Verbesina machucana B.L.Turner
- Verbesina macrophylla (Cass.) S.F.Blake
- Verbesina macvaughii B.L.Turner
- Verbesina madrensis Greenm.
- Verbesina malacophylla S.F.Blake
- Verbesina maldonadoensis H.Rob. & Panero
- Verbesina mameana André
- Verbesina medullosa B.L.Rob.
- Verbesina mexiae B.L.Turner
- Verbesina miahuatlana B.L.Turner
- Verbesina mickelii McVaugh
- Verbesina microcarpa S.F.Blake
- Verbesina microptera DC.
- Verbesina minarum Standl. & Steyerm.
- Verbesina minuticeps S.F.Blake
- Verbesina mixtecana Brandegee
- Verbesina mollis Kunth
- Verbesina monactioides Sagást., S.Leiva & Lezama
- Verbesina montanoifolia B.L.Rob. & Greenm.
- Verbesina monteverdensis Pruski
- Verbesina myriocephala Sch.Bip. ex Klatt

== N ==
- Verbesina nana B.L.Rob. & Greenm.
- Verbesina nayaritensis B.L.Turner
- Verbesina negrensis Steyerm.
- Verbesina nelsonii B.L.Rob. & Greenm.
- Verbesina neotenoriensis B.L.Turner
- Verbesina neriifolia Hemsl.
- Verbesina nervosa S.F.Blake
- Verbesina nicotianifolia Baker
- Verbesina nudipes S.F.Blake

== O ==
- Verbesina oaxacana DC.
- Verbesina occidentalis Walter
- Verbesina ochroleucotricha Sagást.
- Verbesina oerstediana Benth.
- Verbesina oligactis S.F.Blake
- Verbesina oligantha B.L.Rob.
- Verbesina oligocephala I.M.Johnst.
- Verbesina olsenii B.L.Turner
- Verbesina oncophora B.L.Rob. & Seaton
- Verbesina oreophila Wooton & Standl.
- Verbesina ortegae S.F.Blake
- Verbesina otophylla S.F.Blake
- Verbesina otuzcensis Sagást. & Quip.
- Verbesina ovata A.Gray
- Verbesina ovatifolia A.Gray
- Verbesina oxylepis S.F.Blake

== P ==
- Verbesina pallens Benth.
- Verbesina palmeri S.Watson
- Verbesina paneroi B.L.Turner
- Verbesina pantoptera S.F.Blake
- Verbesina papasquiara Panero & Villaseñor
- Verbesina parviflora S.F.Blake
- Verbesina paucicephala Sagást.
- Verbesina pauciflora Hemsl.
- Verbesina pauciramea Sagást., S.Leiva & Lezama
- Verbesina pedunculosa (DC.) B.L.Rob.
- Verbesina pellucida Villaseñor & Panero
- Verbesina peninsularis S.F.Blake
- Verbesina pennellii S.F.Blake
- Verbesina pentalobifolia Sagást.
- Verbesina pentantha S.F.Blake
- Verbesina peraffinis S.F.Blake
- Verbesina perijaensis H.Rob.
- Verbesina perlanata Sagást. & Quip.
- Verbesina persicifolia DC.
- Verbesina peruviana Sagást.
- Verbesina perymenioides Sch.Bip. ex Klatt
- Verbesina petrobioides (Griseb.) S.F.Blake
- Verbesina petrophila Brandegee
- Verbesina petzalensis Standl. & Steyerm.
- Verbesina pflanzii Perkins
- Verbesina phlebodes S.F.Blake
- Verbesina pichinchensis H.Rob.
- Verbesina pietatis McVaugh
- Verbesina pilosa Maguire & Wurdack
- Verbesina piurana Sagást.
- Verbesina planitiei Cuatrec.
- Verbesina platanara B.L.Turner
- Verbesina platyptera Sch.Bip. ex Klatt
- Verbesina pleistocephala B.L.Rob.
- Verbesina plowmanii Sagást.
- Verbesina polyanthes Toledo
- Verbesina portlandiana Proctor
- Verbesina potosina B.L.Rob.
- Verbesina propinqua S.F.Blake
- Verbesina pseudoclaussenii D.J.N.Hind
- Verbesina pseudovirgata B.L.Turner
- Verbesina pterocarpha S.F.Blake
- Verbesina pterocaula DC.
- Verbesina pterophora S.F.Blake
- Verbesina purpusii Brandegee
- Verbesina pustulata M.E.Jones

== Q – R ==
- Verbesina quetamensis Olsen
- Verbesina resinosa Klatt
- Verbesina retifera S.F.Blake
- Verbesina reyesii Panero & Villaseñor
- Verbesina rhomboidea J.Kost.
- Verbesina richardsonii B.L.Turner
- Verbesina rivetii S.F.Blake
- Verbesina robinsonii Fernald
- Verbesina rosei B.L.Rob. & Greenm.
- Verbesina rothrockii B.L.Rob. & Greenm.
- Verbesina rugosa Chodat
- Verbesina rupestris S.F.Blake

== S ==
- Verbesina saltensis Cabrera
- Verbesina salvadorensis S.F.Blake
- Verbesina sanchezii Sagást.
- Verbesina santanderensis S.Díaz
- Verbesina sararensis Cuatrec.
- Verbesina saubinetia Klatt
- Verbesina saubinetioides S.F.Blake
- Verbesina scabrida Rzed.
- Verbesina scabriuscula S.F.Blake
- Verbesina scotiodonta S.F.Blake
- Verbesina seatonii S.F.Blake
- Verbesina semidecurrens Kuntze
- Verbesina sericea Kunth & C.D.Bouché
- Verbesina serrata Cav.
- Verbesina simplicicaulis Sagást.
- Verbesina simulans S.F.Blake
- Verbesina sinaloensis B.L.Turner
- Verbesina sodiroi Hieron.
- Verbesina sordescens DC.
- Verbesina sororia A.Gray
- Verbesina sousae J.J.Fay
- Verbesina sphaerocephala A.Gray
- Verbesina spooneri Panero
- Verbesina steinmannii P.Carrillo
- Verbesina stenophylla Greenm.
- Verbesina strotheri Panero & Villaseñor
- Verbesina subcordata DC.
- Verbesina subdiscoidea Toledo
- Verbesina suberosa P.Carrillo
- Verbesina subrotundifolia Sagást.
- Verbesina suncho S.F.Blake
- Verbesina synethes S.F.Blake
- Verbesina synotis S.F.Blake

== T ==
- Verbesina tachirensis Steyerm.
- Verbesina tamaulipana B.L.Turner
- Verbesina tamaunuevana B.L.Turner
- Verbesina tapantiana Poveda & Hammel
- Verbesina tatei S.F.Blake
- Verbesina tecolotlana B.L.Turner
- Verbesina tenoriesis B.L.Turner
- Verbesina teotepecana B.L.Turner
- Verbesina tequendamensis Cuatrec.
- Verbesina tequilana J.R.Coleman
- Verbesina tetraptera A.Gray
- Verbesina textitlana B.L.Turner
- Verbesina tiburonensis B.L.Turner
- Verbesina torresii B.L.Turner
- Verbesina tostimontis Cuatrec.
- Verbesina tovarii Cabrera
- Verbesina trichantha (Kuntze) S.F.Blake
- Verbesina trilobata B.L.Rob. & Greenm.
- Verbesina trujillensis Aristeg.
- Verbesina turbacensis Kunth

== V ==
- Verbesina vallartana B.L.Turner & Olsen
- Verbesina venosa Greene
- Verbesina villaregalis McVaugh
- Verbesina villasenorii B.L.Turner
- Verbesina villonacoensis H.Rob.
- Verbesina virgata Cav.
- Verbesina virginica L.

== W – Z ==
- Verbesina walteri Shinners
- Verbesina xanthochlora B.L.Rob. & Greenm.
- Verbesina xicoana B.L.Turner
- Verbesina zaragosana B.L.Turner
