= Yellow crownbeard =

Yellow crownbeard is a common name for several plants and may refer to:

- Verbesina helianthoides, native to the United States
- Verbesina occidentalis

== See also ==
- Golden crownbeard
