= Butter daisy =

Butter daisy is a common name for several plants and may refer to:

- Coreopsis grandiflora
- Leucanthemum vulgare
- Melampodium paludosum
- Ranunculus acris
- Verbesina encelioides syn. Ximenesia encelioides
