= ISCR =

ISCR may refer to:

- Institute for Stem Cell Research at the University of Edinburgh, see Scottish Centre for Regenerative Medicine
- Ironwood Springs Christian Ranch, Stewartville, Minnesota, United States
- Istituto Superiore per la Conservazione ed il Restauro, Rome
- Institute for Scientific Computing Research, part of the Lawrence Livermore National Laboratory
- In situ chemical reduction, an environmental remediation technique
