= Ironwood (disambiguation) =

Ironwood is a common name for a large number of woods that have a reputation for hardness. Usage of the name may (or may not) include the tree that yields this wood. There is a list of some of the species involved at the article.

Ironwood may also refer to:

== Places ==
- Ironwood, Michigan, a city in the Upper Peninsula of the U.S. state of Michigan
- Ironwood Township, Michigan, north of the city
- Ironwood High School in Glendale, Arizona
- Ironwood Ridge High School in Tucson, Arizona
- Ironwood Springs Christian Ranch, a Christian camp in Minnesota
- Ironwood State Prison

== Mythology and folklore ==
- Ironwood (Norse mythology), a forest in Norse mythology

== Other ==
- Ironwood (comics), a 1990s erotic comic series by Bill Willingham
- Ironwood Pharmaceuticals, a drug manufacturer
- Catherine Yronwode, comic-book editor whose name is pronounced "Ironwood"

== See also ==
- Ironbark, a common name of species that have dark, deeply furrowed bark
- Ironweed (disambiguation)
