= Ironweed =

Ironweed or iron weed may refer to:

- Ironweed (novel), a 1983 novel by William Kennedy
- Ironweed (film), a 1987 adaptation of Kennedy's novel

== Plants ==
- many species of genus Vernonia
- Cyanthillium cinereum, little ironweed
- Verbesina alternifolia, yellow ironweed

== See also ==
- Ironwood (disambiguation)
