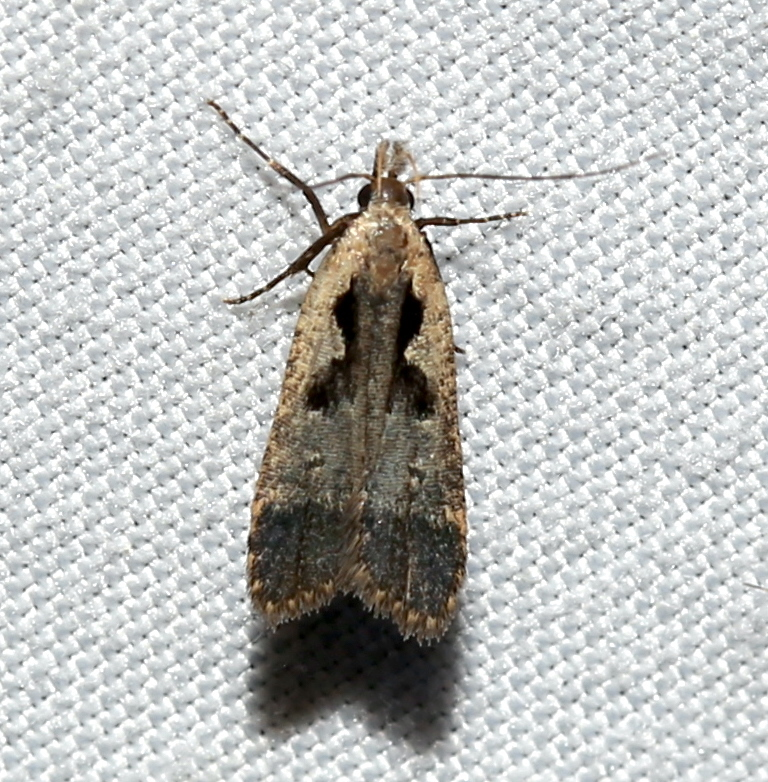

Scientific classification
- Kingdom: Animalia
- Phylum: Arthropoda
- Clade: Pancrustacea
- Class: Insecta
- Order: Lepidoptera
- Family: Gelechiidae
- Genus: Dichomeris
- Species: D. setosella

Binomial name
- Dichomeris setosella (Clemens, 1860)

Synonyms
- Trichotaphe setosella Clemens, 1860; Begoe costolutella Chambers, 1872; Ypsolopha eupatoriella Chambers, 1872; Nothris dolabella Zeller, 1873

= Dichomeris setosella =

Species of moth

Dichomeris setosella is a moth in the family Gelechiidae. It was described by James Brackenridge Clemens in 1860. It is found in North America, where it has been recorded from New York to Florida, Manitoba, eastern Kansas, Oklahoma, Texas and Kentucky.

The forewings are dark brown, slightly dusted with pale ochreous. At the base of the costa is a pale ochreous irregularly triangular patch, slightly dusted with fuscous, angulated on the upper portion of the fold. The angle is margined beneath with blackish brown, with a small patch of the same hue between the angle and base of the wing, and a large one behind it extending from the subcostal nervure to the fold. Across the base of the nervules runs a pale ochreous line, on each side of which the wing is nearly uniform dark brown. The hindwings are yellowish brown. Adults are on wing from March to November.

The larvae feed on Eupatorium and Vernonia species, as well as Verbesina virginica, Pinus strobus, Thuja occidentalis, Pluchea odorata and Ageratina altissima var. angustata.
