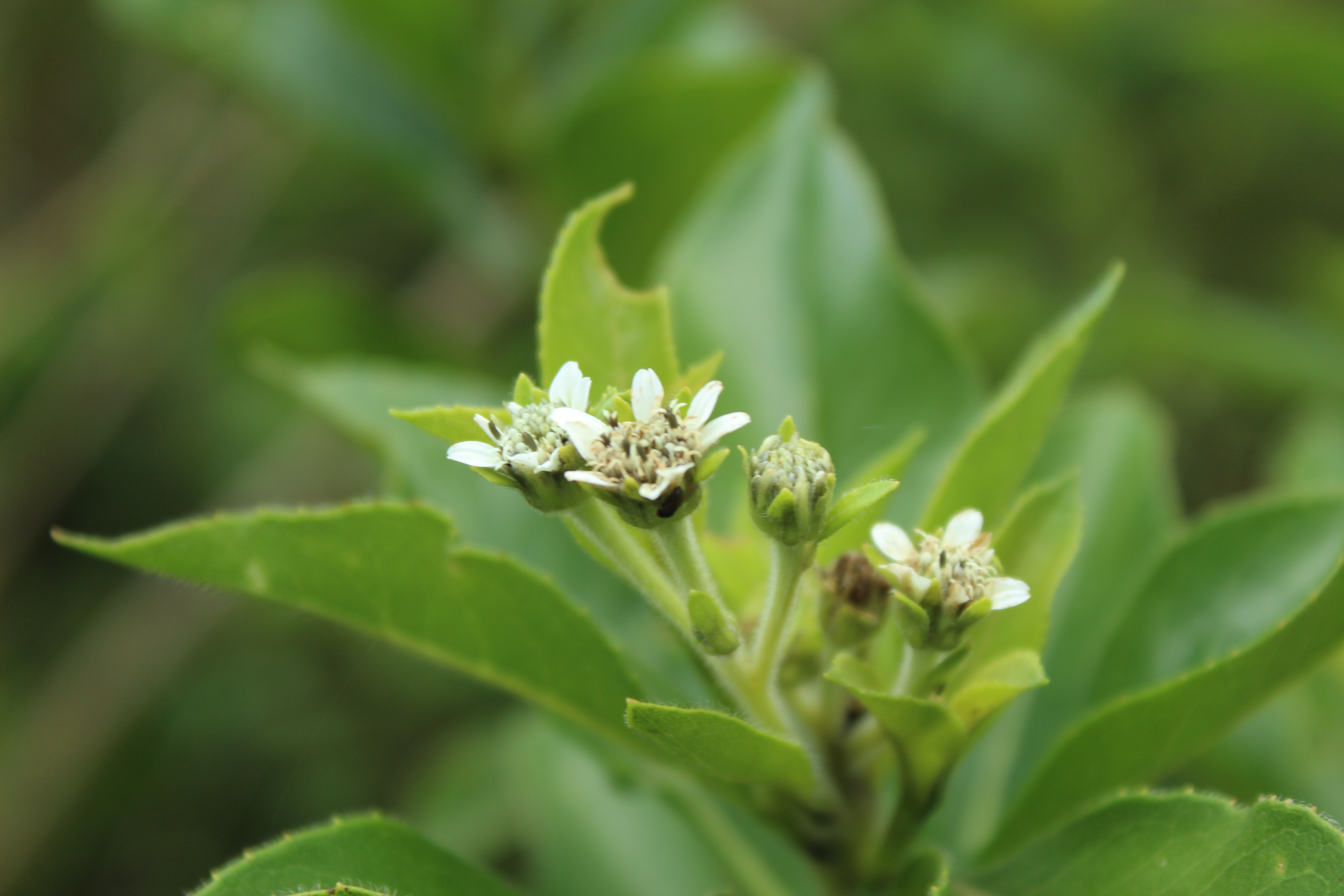

Scientific classification
- Kingdom: Plantae
- Clade: Tracheophytes
- Clade: Angiosperms
- Clade: Eudicots
- Clade: Asterids
- Order: Asterales
- Family: Asteraceae
- Tribe: Heliantheae
- Genus: Verbesina
- Species: V. centroboyacana

Binomial name
- Verbesina centroboyacana S.Díaz, 1985

= Verbesina centroboyacana =

Species of shrub

Verbesina centroboyacana is a species of shrub in the family Asteraceae endemic to Colombia.

== Description ==
Shrub that reaches 8 ft (2.5 m) in height. The leaves are alternate, coriaceous, ovate to ovate-lanceolate, glabrous on the upper surface and lower side; the apex is acute, the base is attenuated, forming a pseudopeciolus; Revolute margin, dentated only in upper two-thirds; pinnate venation. Inflorescences in corymbs or panicles, the pedicels are villous. Uniseriate bell-shaped involucre; the involucral bracts are linear-oblong, widened at the base and acute at the apex, glabrous or with sericeous indumentum towards the base. Convex receptacle; the paleas are oblong, folded, acute, glabrous, dark and with translucent spots, slightly ciliated on the margin. The flowers are white, with 5-10 female ray florets, ligulate, with a pubescent tube, the ligule is elliptical and tridentate, the style is bifid and glabrous, the ovary is triquetral, uniaristate and without a fin; with about 20 disk florets, hermaphroditic, with hairy tubulous corolla, slightly pentadentate, the teeth are oblong; anthers blackish with a mutic base. Obovate compressed achenes 4 mm in length, the external ones are thicker, hairy and with a poorly developed fin; the internal ones with scant indumentum, and a clear and ciliated fin; pappus formed by two ciliated edges.

== Distribution ==
It is endemic to Colombia and is distributed along the Eastern Cordillera in the departments of Boyacá and Cundinamarca. It can be found between 1990 and 3120 meters above sea level.
