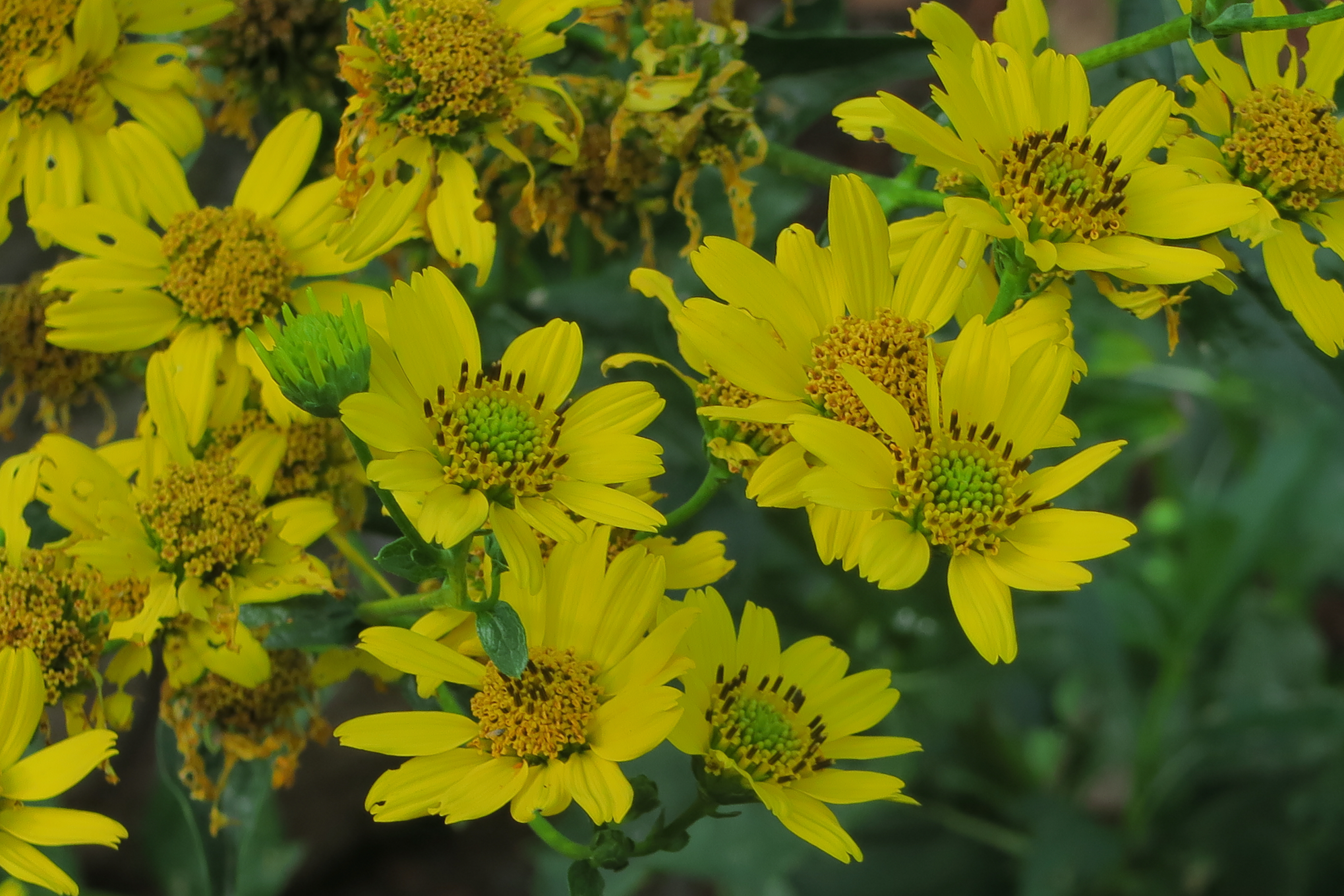

Conservation status
- Imperiled (NatureServe)

Scientific classification
- Kingdom: Plantae
- Clade: Tracheophytes
- Clade: Angiosperms
- Clade: Eudicots
- Clade: Asterids
- Order: Asterales
- Family: Asteraceae
- Tribe: Heliantheae
- Genus: Verbesina
- Species: V. dissita

Binomial name
- Verbesina dissita A.Gray

= Verbesina dissita =

Species of flowering plant

Verbesina dissita is a rare species of flowering plant in the family Asteraceae known by the common name bigleaf crownbeard. It is native to northern Baja California in Mexico, where it is known from about 23 occurrences, although some of these may have been extirpated or are vulnerable to destruction. It is also known from a 3.2-kilometer section of the coastline near Laguna Beach in southern California, where it is susceptible to extirpation in a highly developed section of valuable oceanfront land. Other threats include erosion and competitive introduced species of plants. This is a federally listed threatened species of the United States.

This is a subshrub growing 50 centimeters to over a meter in height. The green leaves are oppositely arranged and have oval blades up to 12 centimeters long by 6 wide. They are hairless to roughly hairy and have smooth or slightly toothed edges. The inflorescence is a cyme of up to 16 sunflower-like flower heads with deep yellow ray florets each up to 2.5 centimeters long. At the center are up to 100 disc florets with long yellow corollas and dark brown anthers. The fruit is a brown, winged achene over a centimeter in length including the pappus at the tip.
