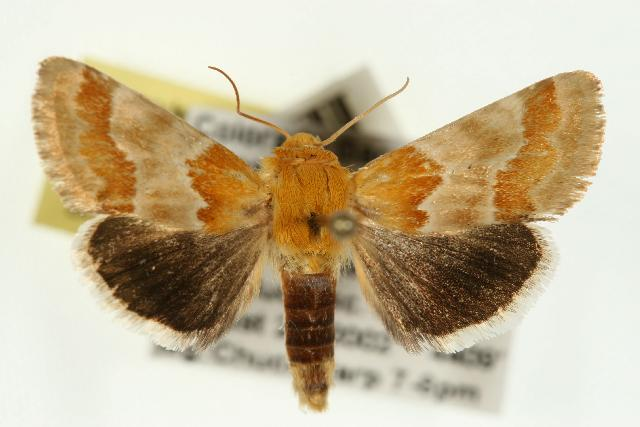

Scientific classification
- Kingdom: Animalia
- Phylum: Arthropoda
- Class: Insecta
- Order: Lepidoptera
- Superfamily: Noctuoidea
- Family: Noctuidae
- Genus: Schinia
- Species: S. siren

Binomial name
- Schinia siren Strecker, 1876

Synonyms
- Schinia inclara Strecker, 1876

= Schinia siren =

Species of moth

The aluring schinia moth (Schinia siren) is a moth of the family Noctuidae. It is found in North America, including Arizona, Colorado, Kansas, Nebraska, New Mexico, Oklahoma, South Carolina and Texas.

The wingspan is about 22 mm.

The larvae feed on Verbesina encelioides.
