= Verbesina pseudoclausseni =

Conservation status
- Vulnerable (IUCN 2.3)

Scientific classification
- Kingdom: Plantae
- Clade: Tracheophytes
- Clade: Angiosperms
- Clade: Eudicots
- Clade: Asterids
- Order: Asterales
- Family: Asteraceae
- Tribe: Heliantheae
- Genus: Verbesina
- Species: V. pseudoclausseni

Binomial name
- Verbesina pseudoclausseni D.J.N.Hind

Species of flowering plant

Verbesina pseudoclausseni is a species of flowering plant in the family Asteraceae. It is only found in Brazil.
