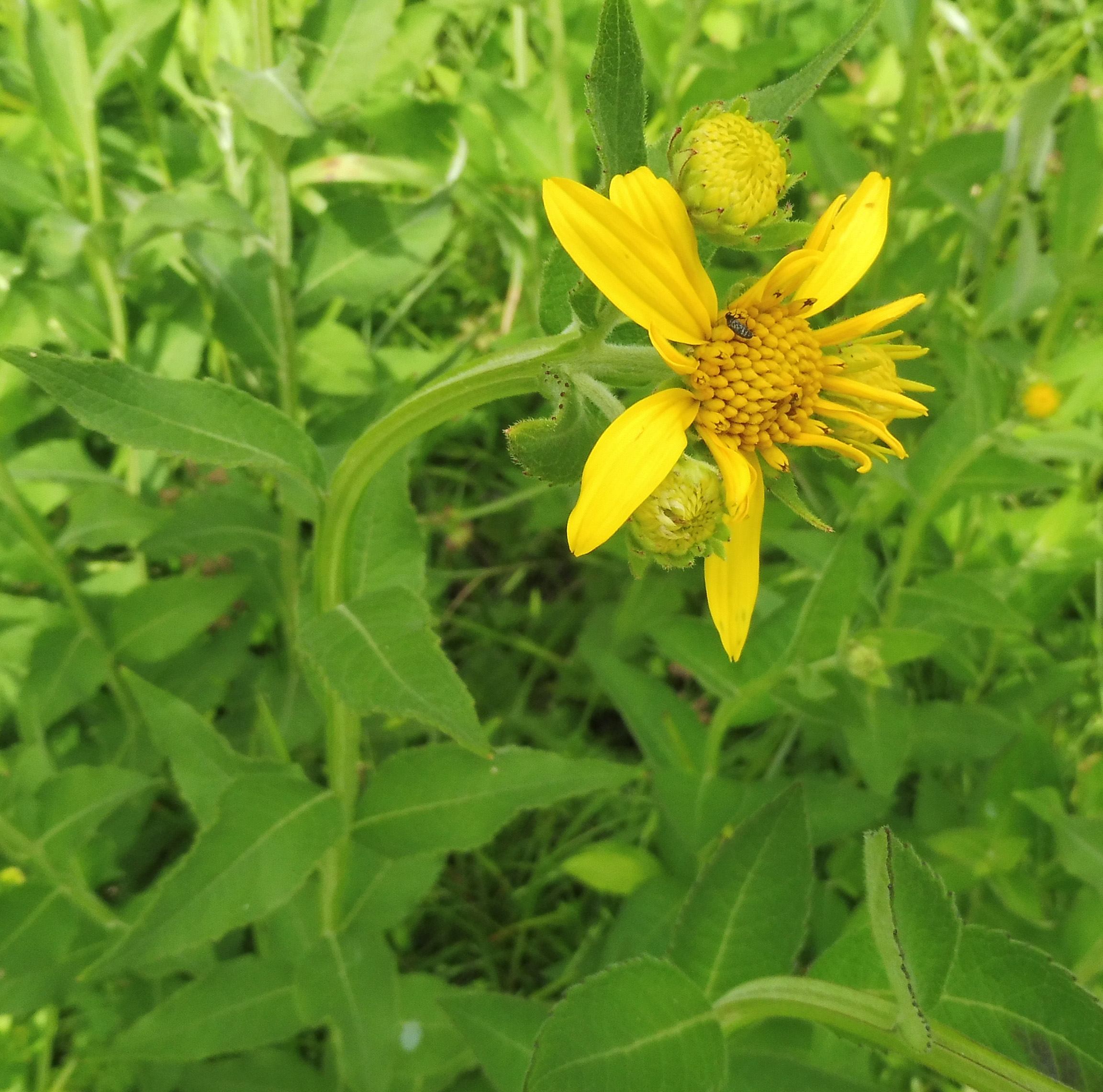

Conservation status
- Secure (NatureServe)

Scientific classification
- Kingdom: Plantae
- Clade: Tracheophytes
- Clade: Angiosperms
- Clade: Eudicots
- Clade: Asterids
- Order: Asterales
- Family: Asteraceae
- Genus: Verbesina
- Species: V. helianthoides

Binomial name
- Verbesina helianthoides Michx.

= Verbesina helianthoides =

Species of flowering plant

Verbesina helianthoides, commonly called yellow crownbeard or gravelweed, is a species of flowering plant in the family Asteraceae. It is native to the United States, where it is primarily found in the Upper South and South Central areas. Its natural habitat is in communities that receive ample sunlight, such as open woodlands, prairies, and glades.

Verbesina helianthoides is a tall, leafy perennial that grows to a height of 1 m (39 in). It has hairy, winged stems and alternate leaves that are coarsely hairy on the upper surface. The leaves have widely spaced, small teeth and are 6–15 cm (2.4–5.9 in) long. It produces yellow flowers from May to October. Each composite flower is 5–6 cm (2–2.5 in) across and has 40 to 80 yellow tubular disk flowers surrounded by about twelve yellow ray flowers. Its flowering time starts much earlier in the year than other Verbesina that it co-occurs with, such as Verbesina alternifolia with yellow flowers and Verbesina virginica with white flowers. It also is shorter in height.
