= Verbesina rupestris =

Conservation status
- Vulnerable (IUCN 2.3)

Scientific classification
- Kingdom: Plantae
- Clade: Tracheophytes
- Clade: Angiosperms
- Clade: Eudicots
- Clade: Asterids
- Order: Asterales
- Family: Asteraceae
- Tribe: Heliantheae
- Genus: Verbesina
- Species: V. rupestris

Binomial name
- Verbesina rupestris S.F.Blake

Species of flowering plant

Verbesina rupestris is a species of flowering plant in the family Asteraceae. It is found only in Jamaica. It is threatened by habitat loss.
