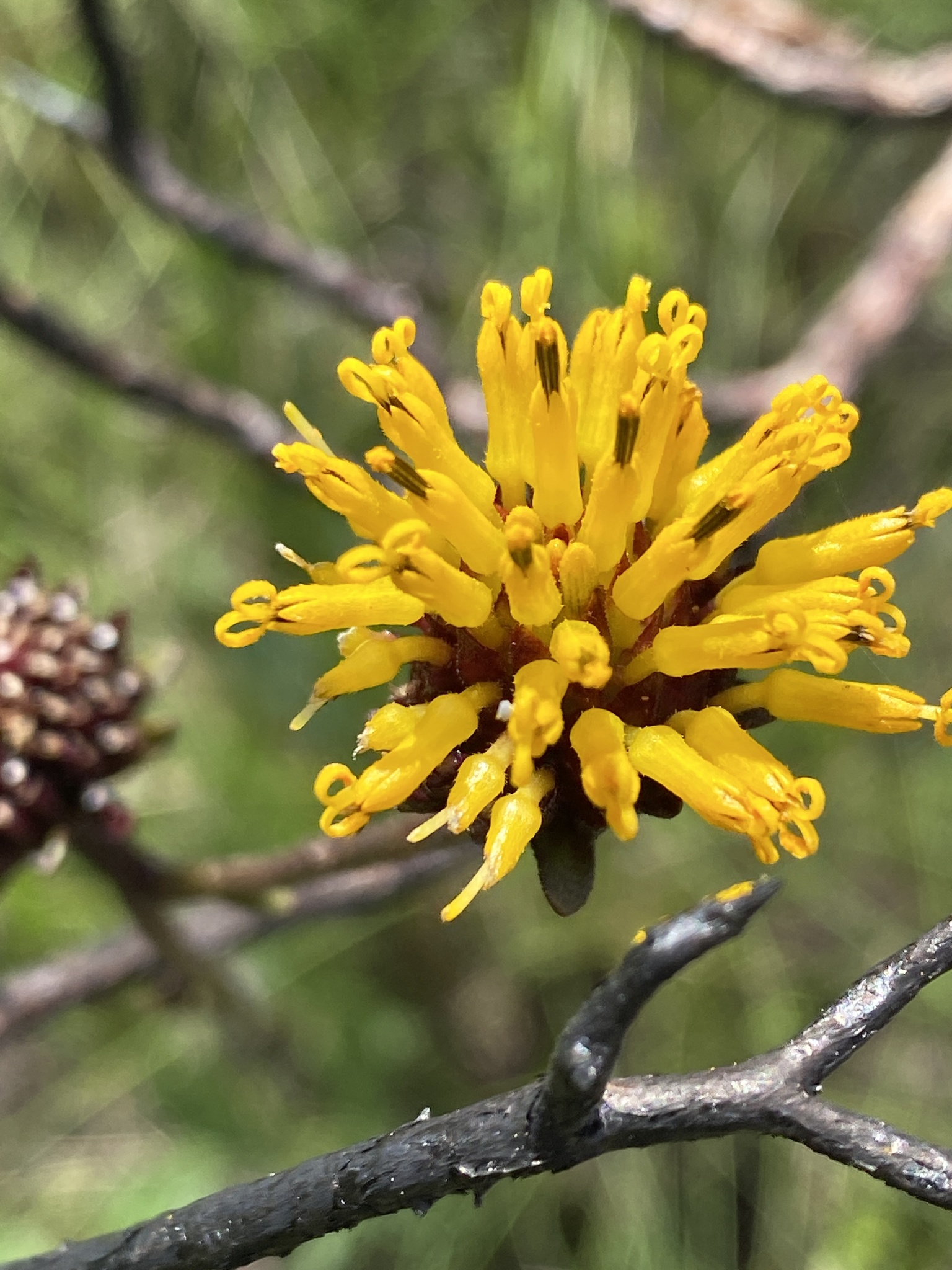

Scientific classification
- Kingdom: Plantae
- Clade: Embryophytes
- Clade: Tracheophytes
- Clade: Spermatophytes
- Clade: Angiosperms
- Clade: Eudicots
- Clade: Asterids
- Order: Asterales
- Family: Asteraceae
- Tribe: Heliantheae
- Genus: Verbesina
- Species: V. chapmanii

Binomial name
- Verbesina chapmanii J.R.Coleman

= Verbesina chapmanii =

Species of flowering plant

Verbesina chapmanii, commonly known as Chapman's crownbeard, is a perennial species of flowering plant in the family Asteraceae. It is endemic to the Florida Panhandle. It typically grows up to 31 inches tall.

== Description ==
Verbesina chapmanii is a perennial dicot that typically grows 50 to 80 cm (20 to 31 in) tall. The leaves are mostly opposite; the leaf blades are elliptic, and are 3 to 10 × 0.8 to 3 cm; the leaf bases are cuneate. There are 1 to 3 flower heads per plant. the involucres are hemispherical to turbinate, and are 8 to 16 mm (0.80 to 1.60 cm) in diameter. There are 0 ray florets, and 40-80 disc florets. The corollas are yellow. The elliptic cypselae are "purplish black", and are 5-7 mm in length. The pappi are up to 0.3 mm in length.

It flowers from June to August.

== Distribution and habitat ==
It is endemic to the Florida Panhandle. It grows in pine barrens, bogs, and flatwoods at elevations of 10 to 30 meters from sea level.

== Taxonomy ==
The name Verbesina chapmanii was first published in 1972 by J. R. Coleman.
