= Verbesina petrobioides =

Conservation status
- Near Threatened (IUCN 2.3)

Scientific classification
- Kingdom: Plantae
- Clade: Tracheophytes
- Clade: Angiosperms
- Clade: Eudicots
- Clade: Asterids
- Order: Asterales
- Family: Asteraceae
- Tribe: Heliantheae
- Genus: Verbesina
- Species: V. petrobioides

Binomial name
- Verbesina petrobioides (Griseb.) S.F.Blake

Synonyms
- Chaenocephalus petrobioides Griseb.

Species of flowering plant

Verbesina petrobioides is a species of flowering plant in the family Asteraceae. It is found only in Jamaica.
