= Shrub =

Small- to medium-sized perennial woody plant

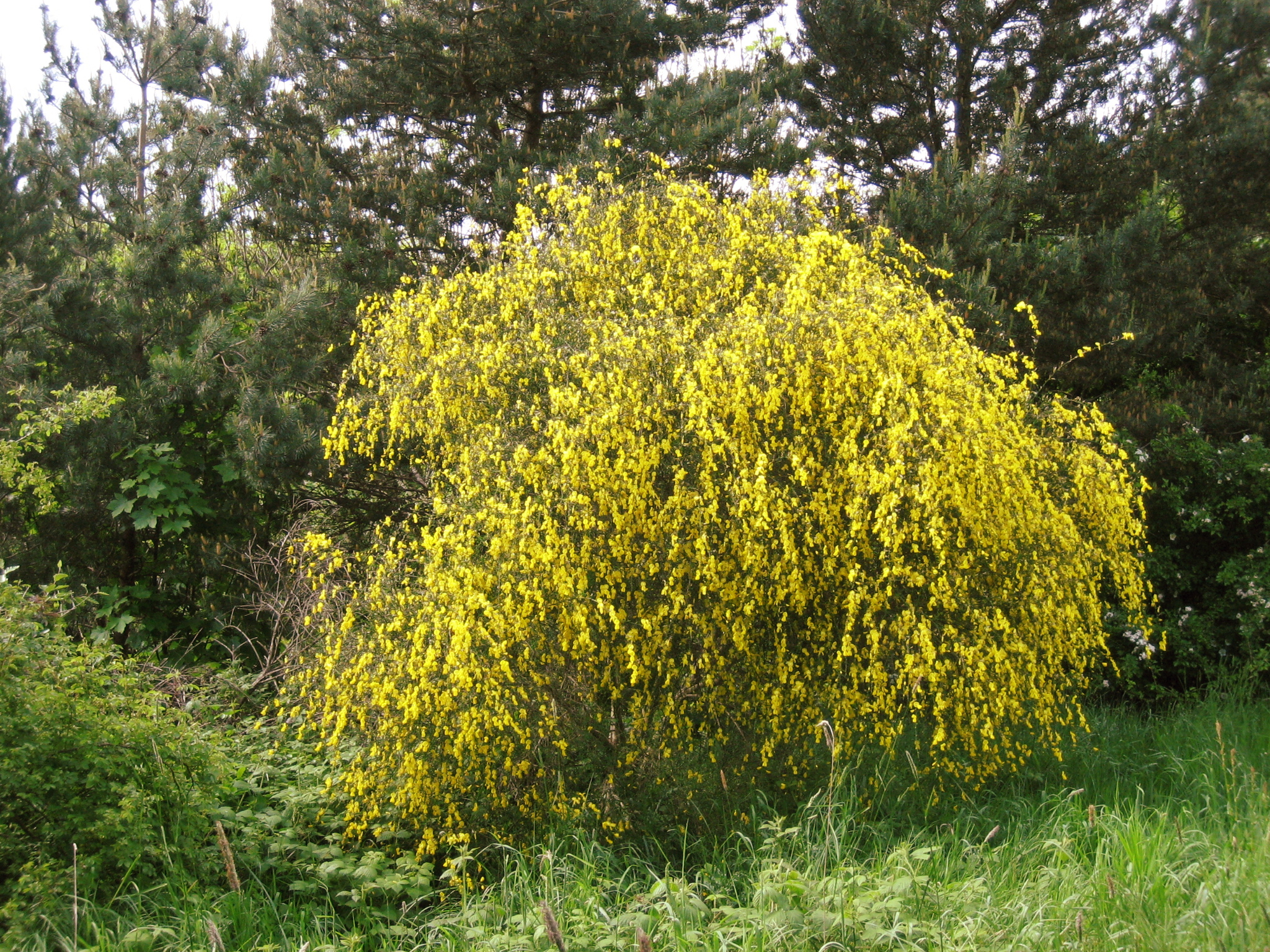
A broom shrub in flower

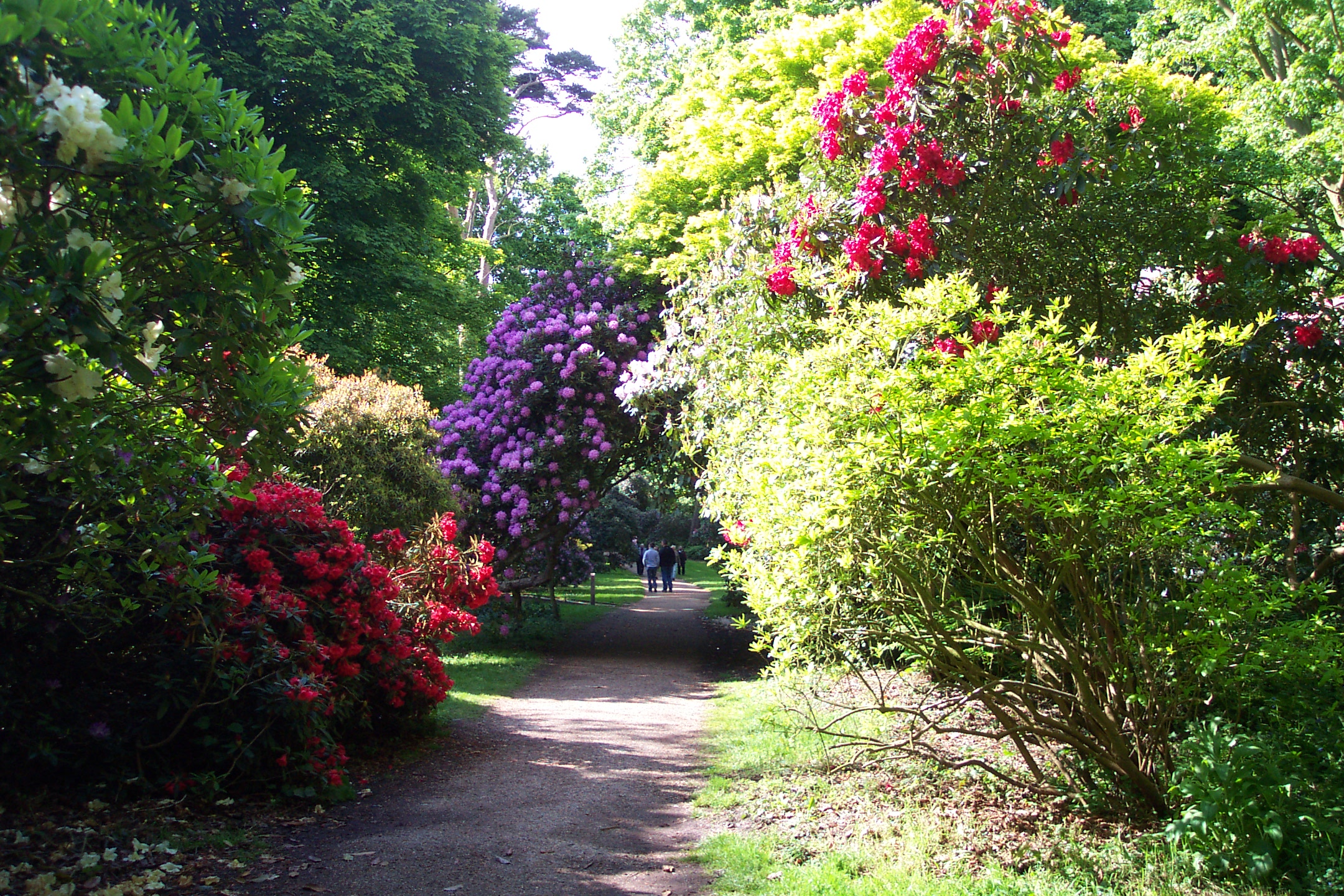
A rhododendron shrubbery in Sheringham Park

A shrub or bush is a small to medium-sized perennial woody plant. Unlike herbaceous plants, shrubs have persistent woody stems above the ground. Shrubs can be either deciduous or evergreen. They are distinguished from trees by their multiple stems and shorter height, less than 6–10 m (20–33 ft) tall, the cutoff point varying within this range for any one species due to suitability of growing conditions in any one environment. Some tree species never achieve their mature height because of hostile, less than ideal growing conditions in certain areas, and can resemble shrub-sized plants. Small shrubs, less than 2 m (6.6 ft) tall are sometimes termed as subshrubs. Some shrub species only last about five years in good conditions, while others, usually larger and more woody, live beyond 70 years; on average, shrub species die after about eight years.

Shrubland is the natural landscape dominated by various shrubs; there are many distinct types around the world, including fynbos, maquis, shrub-steppe, shrub swamp and moorland. In gardens and parks, an area largely dedicated to shrubs (now somewhat less fashionable than a century ago) is called a shrubbery, shrub border or shrub garden. There are many garden cultivars of shrubs, bred for flowering, for example rhododendrons, and sometimes even leaf colour or shape.

Apart from the several berry-bearing shrub species (using the culinary rather than botanical definition), few are eaten directly, and they are generally too small for much timber use unlike trees. Those that are used include several perfumed species such as lavender and rose, and a wide range of plants with medicinal uses. Tea and coffee are on the tree-shrub boundary; they are normally harvested from shrub-sized plants, but these would be large enough to become small trees if left to grow instead.

== Definition ==
Shrubs are perennial woody plants, and therefore have persistent woody stems above ground (compare with succulent stems of herbaceous plants). Usually, shrubs are distinguished from trees by their height and multiple stems. Some shrubs are deciduous (e.g. hawthorn) and others evergreen (e.g. holly). Ancient Greek philosopher Theophrastus divided the plant world into trees, shrubs and herbs. Small, low shrubs, generally less than 2 m (6.6 ft) tall, such as lavender, periwinkle and most small garden varieties of rose, are often termed as subshrubs.

Most definitions characterize shrubs as possessing multiple stems with no main trunk below. This is because the stems have branched below ground level. There are exceptions to this, with some shrubs having main trunks, but these tend to be very short and divide into multiple stems close to ground level without a reasonable length beforehand. Many trees can grow in multiple stemmed forms also while being tall enough to be trees, such as oak or ash.

== Evolution and adaptive value of growth form ==
Ecologists and evolutionary biologists have paid little attention to why there are two major growth forms of woody plants; shrubs and trees, both occurring on large land area, and often together. While the time when the first shrubs appeared on the Earth is difficult to establish, hypotheses explaining the adaptive value of having multiple stems, compared to a single one in trees, exist. One model is based on the advantages of having many stems, with larger total stem area for photosynthesis (on, and under bark), larger area of cambium and phloem, and larger area for sprouting from stems, compared to a (small) tree with same initial woody volume. This model could successfully predict faster shrub growth than tree growth at early stages. Other advantages for shrubs (compared to trees) include for instance extra stems in case one die, and faster seed production. It is not surprising that at least angiosperm trees, if cut or broken, revert to shrub growth form for fast growth (due to their capacity of sprouting at the base, and thus becoming shrub-like for some time).

Many shrubs, such as Salix species, have good dispersal ability (seeds disperse by air) and many shrubs are also able to grow in more extreme habitats, such as alpine areas, where trees are less common. The last decades have seen 'shrubification' in the arctic, with marked increase of shrublands. One reason is increased temperature, with consequences for plant community structure and carbon balance.

== Use in gardens and parks ==
An area of cultivated shrubs in a park or a garden is known as a shrubbery. When clipped as topiary, suitable species or varieties of shrubs develop dense foliage and many small leafy branches growing close together. Many shrubs respond well to renewal pruning, in which hard cutting back to a "stool", removes everything but vital parts of the plant, resulting in long new stems known as "canes". Other shrubs respond better to selective pruning to dead or unhealthy, or otherwise unattractive parts to reveal their structure and character.

Shrubs in common garden practice are generally considered broad-leaved plants, though some smaller conifers such as mountain pine and common juniper are also shrubby in structure. Species that grow into a shrubby habit may be either deciduous or evergreen.

== Botanical structure ==
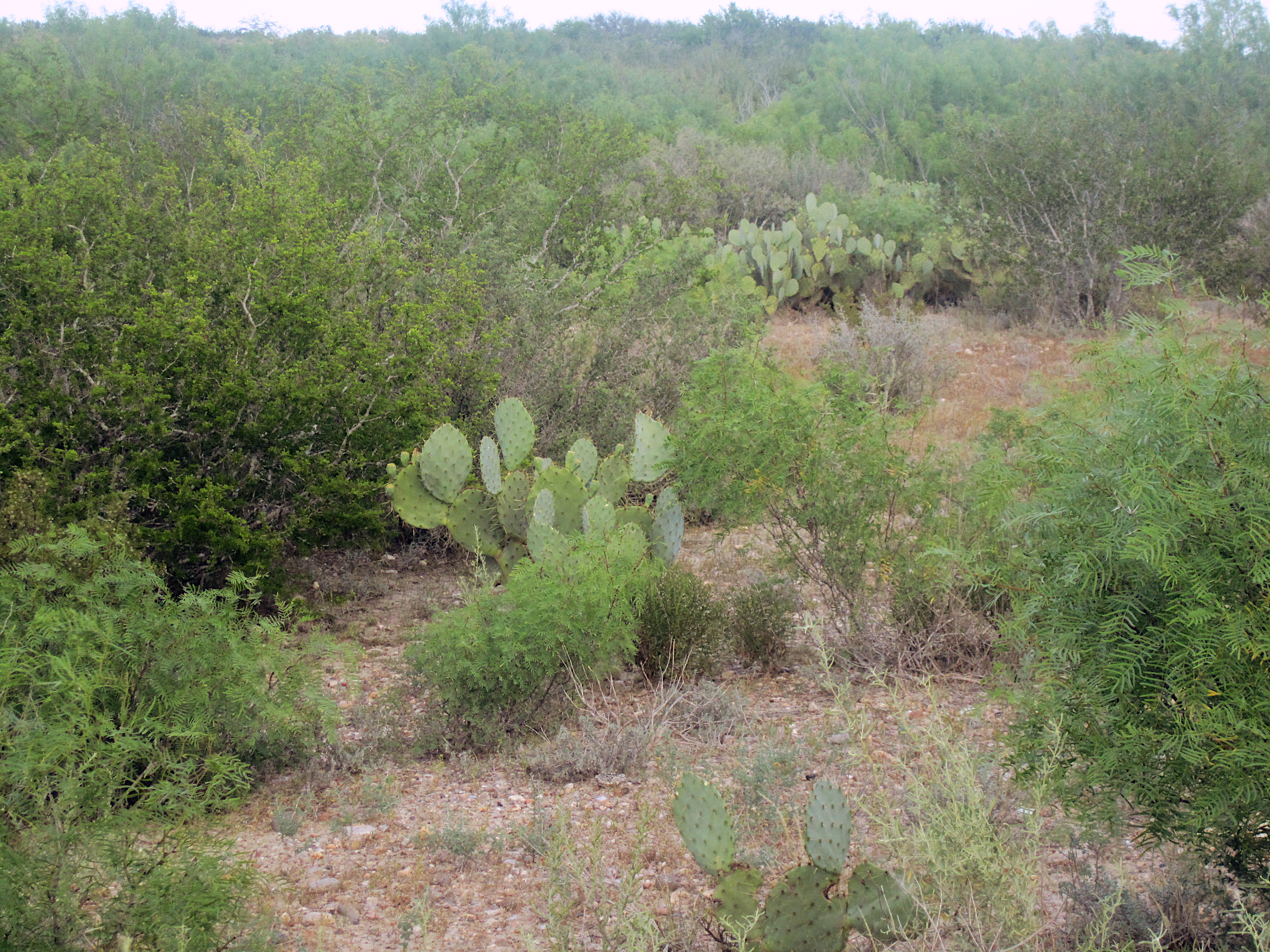
Shrub vegetation (with some cacti) in Webb County, Texas.

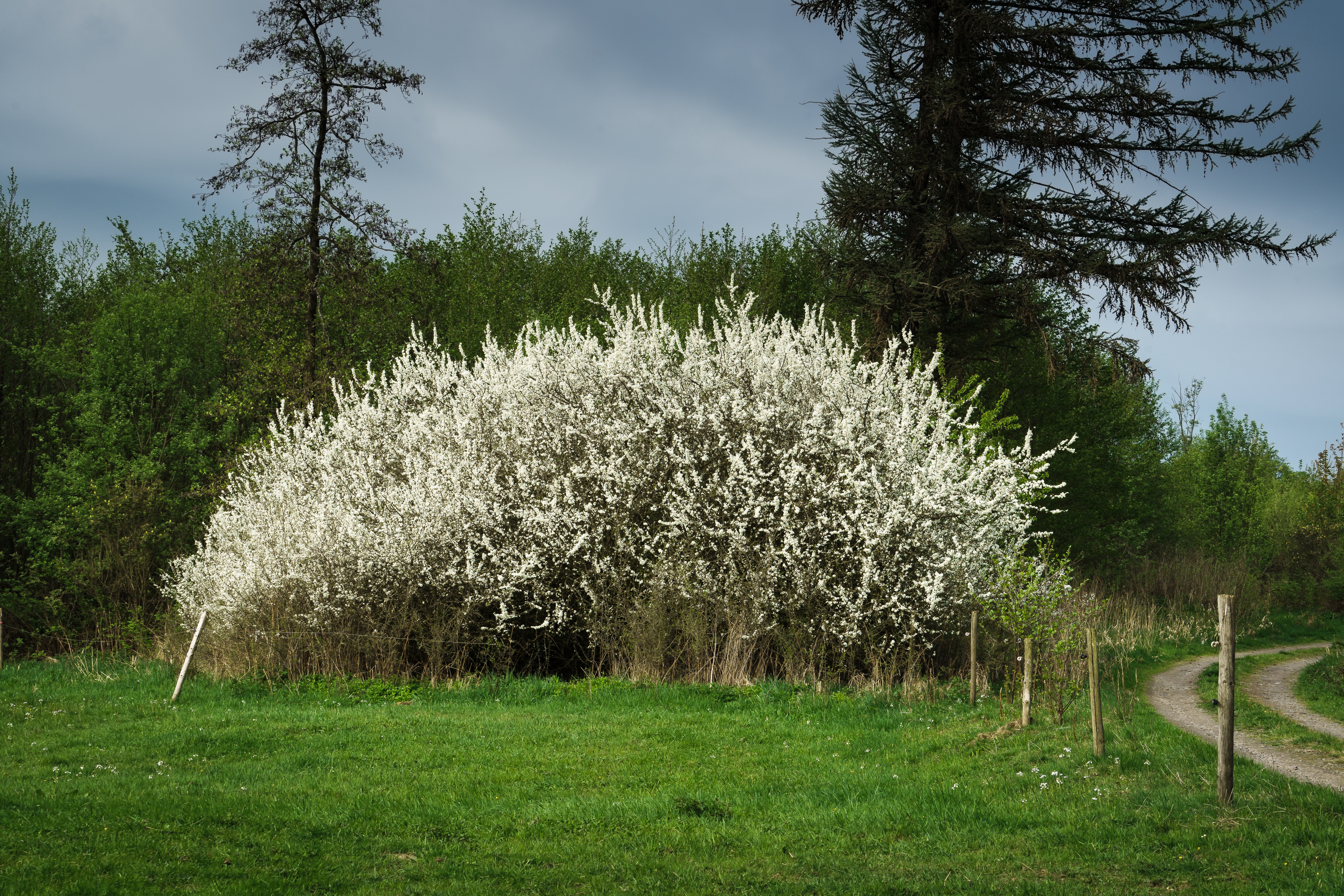
Blackthorn shrub (Prunus spinosa) in the Vogelsberg

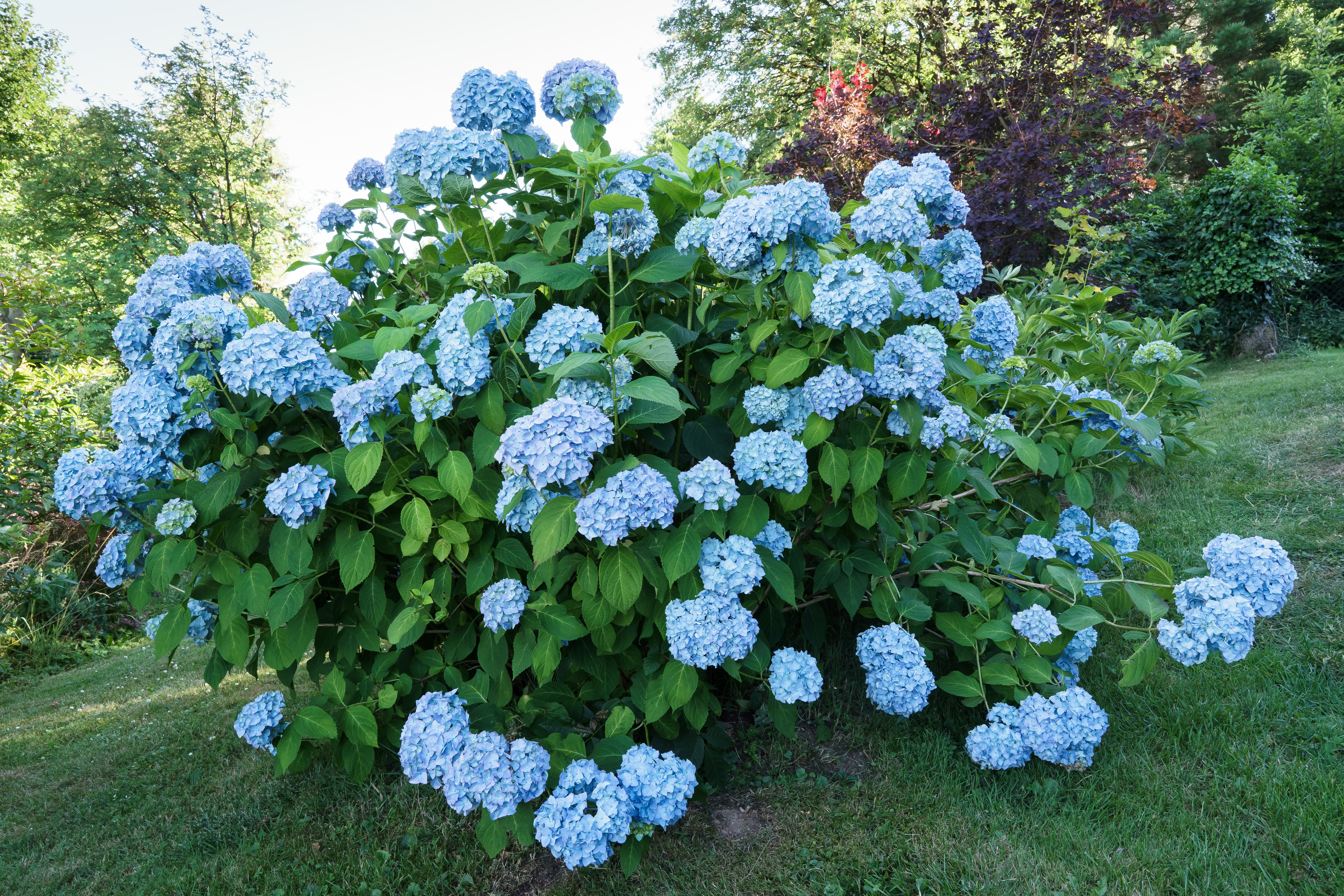
Hydrangea macrophylla

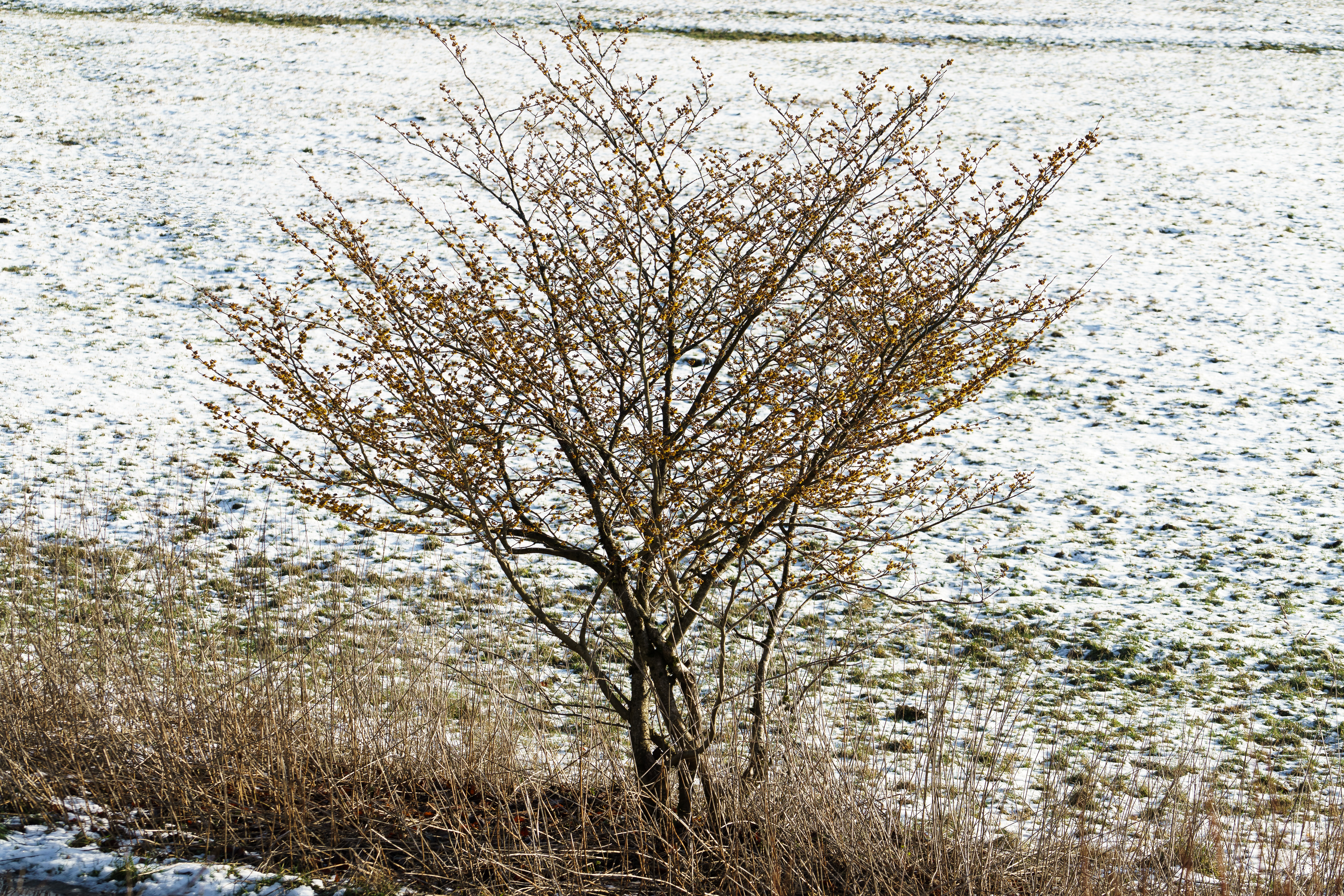
Winter-flowering Witch-hazel (Hamamelis)

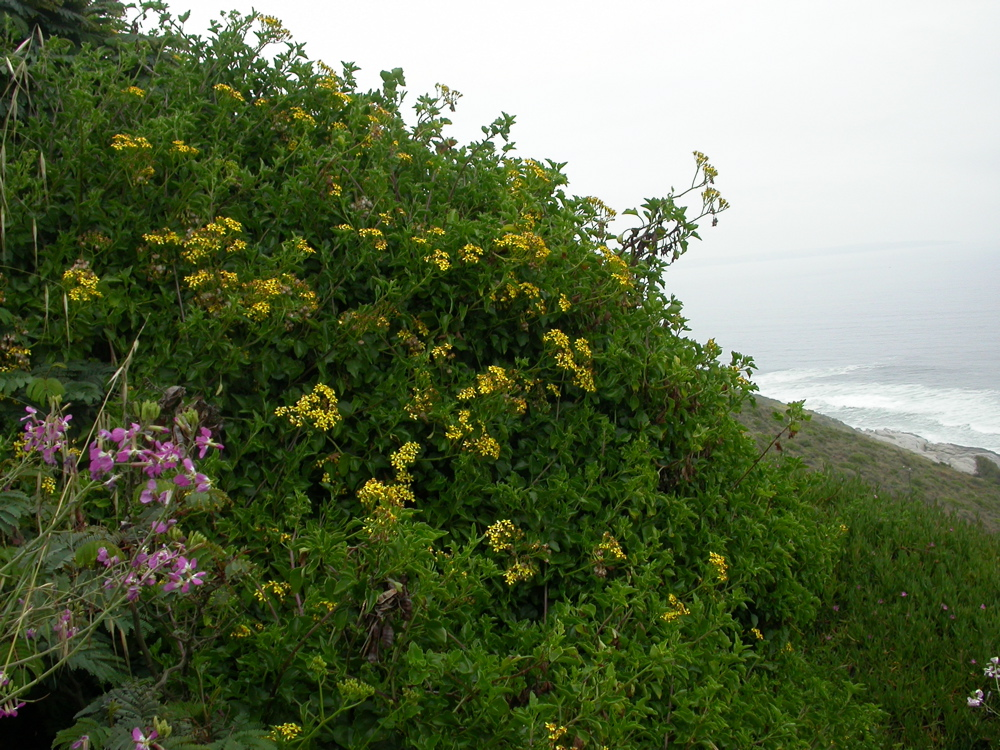
Senecio angulatus, a scrambling shrub by the sea (yellow-flowered).

In botany and ecology, a shrub is more specifically used to describe the particular physical canopy structure or plant life-form of woody plants which are less than 8 metres (26 ft) high and usually multiple stems arising at or near the surface of the ground. For example, a descriptive system widely adopted in Australia is based on structural characteristics based on life-form, plus the height and amount of foliage cover of the tallest layer or dominant species.

For shrubs that are 2–8 metres (6.6–26.2 ft) high, the following structural forms are categorized:

- dense foliage cover (70–100%) — closed-shrubs
- mid-dense foliage cover (30–70%) — open-shrubs
- sparse foliage cover (10–30%) — tall shrubland
- very sparse foliage cover (<10%) — tall open shrubland

For shrubs less than 2 metres (6.6 ft) high, the following structural forms are categorized:

- dense foliage cover (70–100%) — closed-heath or closed low shrubland—(North America)
- mid-dense foliage cover (30–70%) — open-heath or mid-dense low shrubland—(North America)
- sparse foliage cover (10–30%) — low shrubland
- very sparse foliage cover (<10%) — low open shrubland

== List ==
Those marked with * can also develop into tree form if in ideal conditions.

A

- Abelia (Abelia)
- Acer (Maple) *
- Actinidia (Actinidia)
- Aloe (Aloe)
- Aralia (Angelica Tree, Hercules' Club) *
- Arctostaphylos (Bearberry, Manzanita) *
- Aronia (Chokeberry)
- Artemisia (Sagebrush)
- Aucuba (Aucuba)

B

- Berberis (Barberry)
- Bougainvillea (Bougainvillea)
- Brugmansia (Angel's trumpet)
- Buddleja (Butterfly bush)
- Buxus (Box) *

C

- Calia (Mescalbean)
- Callicarpa (Beautyberry) *
- Callistemon (Bottlebrush) *
- Calluna (Heather)
- Calycanthus (Sweetshrub)
- Camellia (Camellia, Tea) *
- Caragana (Pea-tree) *
- Carpenteria (Carpenteria)
- Caryopteris (Blue spiraea)
- Cassiope (Moss-heather)
- Ceanothus (Ceanothus) *
- Celastrus (Staff vine) *
- Ceratostigma (Hardy Plumbago)
- Cercocarpus (Mountain-mahogany) *
- Chaenomeles (Japanese Quince)
- Chamaebatiaria (Fernbush)
- Chamaedaphne (Leatherleaf)
- Chimonanthus (Wintersweet)
- Chionanthus (Fringe-tree) *
- Choisya (Mexican-orange Blossom) *
- Cistus (Rockrose)
- Clerodendrum (Clerodendrum)
- Clethra (Summersweet, Pepperbush) *
- Clianthus (Glory Pea)
- Colletia (Colletia)
- Colutea (Bladder Senna)
- Comptonia (Sweetfern)
- Cornus (Dogwood) *
- Corylopsis (Winter-hazel) *
- Cotinus (Smoketree) *
- Cotoneaster (Cotoneaster) *
- Cowania (Cliffrose)
- Crataegus (Hawthorn) *
- Crinodendron (Crinodendron) *
- Cytisus and allied genera (Broom) *

D

- Daboecia (Heath)
- Danae (Alexandrian laurel)
- Daphne (Daphne)
- Decaisnea (Decaisnea)
- Dasiphora (Shrubby Cinquefoil)
- Dendromecon (Tree poppy)
- Desfontainea (Desfontainea)
- Deutzia (Deutzia)
- Diervilla (Bush honeysuckle)
- Dipelta (Dipelta)
- Dirca (Leatherwood)
- Dracaena (Dragon tree) *
- Drimys (Winter's Bark) *
- Dryas (Mountain Avens)

E

- Edgeworthia (Paper Bush) *
- Elaeagnus (Elaeagnus) *
- Embothrium (Chilean Firebush) *
- Empetrum (Crowberry)
- Enkianthus (Pagoda Bush)
- Ephedra (Ephedra)
- Epigaea (Trailing Arbutus)
- Erica (Heath)
- Eriobotrya (Loquat) *
- Escallonia (Escallonia)
- Eucryphia (Eucryphia) *
- Euonymus (Spindle) *
- Exochorda (Pearl Bush)

F

- Fabiana (Fabiana)
- Fallugia (Apache Plume)
- Fatsia (Fatsia)
- Forsythia (Forsythia)
- Fothergilla (Fothergilla)
- Franklinia (Franklinia) *
- Fremontodendron (Flannelbush)
- Fuchsia (Fuchsia) *

G

- Garrya (Silk-tassel) *
- Gaultheria (Salal)
- Gaylussacia (Huckleberry)
- Genista (Broom) *
- Gordonia (Loblolly-bay) *
- Grevillea (Grevillea)
- Griselinia (Griselinia) *

H

- Hakea (Hakea) *
- Halesia (Silverbell) *
- Halimium (Rockrose)
- Hamamelis (Witch-hazel) *
- Hebe (Hebe)
- Hedera (Ivy)
- Helianthemum (Rockrose)
- Hibiscus (Hibiscus) *
- Hippophae (Sea-buckthorn) *
- Hoheria (Lacebark) *
- Holodiscus (Creambush)
- Hudsonia (Hudsonia)
- Hydrangea (Hydrangea)
- Hypericum (Rose of Sharon)
- Hyssopus (Hyssop)

I

- Ilex (Holly) *
- Illicium (Star Anise) *
- Indigofera (Indigo)
- Itea (Sweetspire)

J

- Jamesia (Cliffbush)
- Jasminum (Jasmine)
- Juniperus (Juniper) *

K

- Kalmia (Mountain-laurel)
- Kerria (Kerria)
- Kolkwitzia (Beauty-bush)

L

- Lagerstroemia (Crape-myrtle) *
- Lapageria (Copihue)
- Lantana (Lantana)
- Lavandula (Lavender)
- Lavatera (Tree Mallow)
- Ledum (Ledum)
- Leitneria (Corkwood) *
- Lespedeza (Bush Clover) *
- Leptospermum (Manuka) *
- Leucothoe (Doghobble)
- Leycesteria (Leycesteria)
- Ligustrum (Privet) *
- Lindera (Spicebush) *
- Linnaea (Twinflower)
- Lonicera (Honeysuckle)
- Lupinus (Tree Lupin)
- Lycium (Boxthorn)

M

- Magnolia (Magnolia)
- Mahonia (Mahonia)
- Malpighia (Acerola)
- Menispermum (Moonseed)
- Menziesia (Menziesia)
- Mespilus (Medlar) *
- Microcachrys (Microcachrys)
- Myrica (Bayberry) *
- Myricaria (Myricaria)
- Myrtus and allied genera (Myrtle) *

N

- Neillia (Neillia)
- Nerium (Oleander)

O

- Olearia (Daisy bush) *
- Osmanthus (Osmanthus)

P

- Pachysandra (Pachysandra)
- Paeonia (Tree-peony)
- Persoonia (Geebungs)
- Philadelphus (Mock orange) *
- Phlomis (Jerusalem Sage)
- Photinia (Photinia) *
- Physocarpus (Ninebark) *
- Pieris (Pieris)
- Pistacia (Pistachio, Mastic) *
- Pittosporum (Pittosporum) *
- Plumbago (Leadwort)
- Polygala (Milkwort)
- Poncirus *
- Prunus (Cherry) *
- Purshia (Antelope Bush)
- Pyracantha (Firethorn)

Q

- Quassia (Quassia) *
- Quercus (Oak) *
- Quillaja (Quillay)
- Quintinia (Tawheowheo) *

R

- Rhamnus (Buckthorn) *
- Rhododendron (Rhododendron, Azalea) *
- Rhus (Sumac) *
- Ribes (Currant, Gooseberry)
- Romneya (Tree poppy)
- Rosa (Rose)
- Rosmarinus (Rosemary)
- Rubus (Bramble, Raspberry, Salmonberry, Wineberry)
- Ruta (Rue)

S

- Sabia *
- Salix (Willow) *
- Salvia (Sage)
- Sambucus (Elder) *
- Santolina (Lavender Cotton)
- Sapindus (Soapberry) *
- Senecio (Senecio)
- Simmondsia (Jojoba)
- Skimmia (Skimmia)
- Smilax (Smilax)
- Sophora (Kōwhai) *
- Sorbaria (Sorbaria)
- Spartium (Spanish Broom)
- Spiraea (Spiraea) *
- Staphylea (Bladdernut) *
- Stephanandra (Stephanandra)
- Styrax *
- Symphoricarpos (Snowberry)
- Syringa (Lilac) *

T

- Tamarix (Tamarix) *
- Taxus (Yew) *
- Telopea (Waratah) *
- Thuja cvs. (Arborvitae) *
- Thymelaea
- Thymus (Thyme)
- Trochodendron *

U

- Ulex (Gorse)
- Ulmus pumila celer (Turkestan elm – Wonder Hedge)
- Ungnadia (Mexican Buckeye)

V

- Vaccinium (Bilberry, Blueberry, Cranberry)
- Verbesina centroboyacana
- Verbena (Vervain)
- Viburnum (Viburnum) *
- Vinca (Periwinkle)
- Viscum (Mistletoe)

W

- Weigela (Weigela)

X

- Xanthoceras
- Xanthorhiza (Yellowroot)
- Xylosma

Y

- Yucca (Yucca, Joshua tree) *

Z

- Zanthoxylum *
- Zauschneria
- Zenobia
- Ziziphus *
