= Verbesina mameana =

Conservation status
- Data Deficient (IUCN 3.1)

Scientific classification
- Kingdom: Plantae
- Clade: Tracheophytes
- Clade: Angiosperms
- Clade: Eudicots
- Clade: Asterids
- Order: Asterales
- Family: Asteraceae
- Tribe: Heliantheae
- Genus: Verbesina
- Species: V. mameana

Binomial name
- Verbesina mameana Andrè

Species of plant

Verbesina mameana is a species of flowering plant in the family Asteraceae. It is found only in Ecuador. Its natural habitat is subtropical or tropical moist montane forests. It is threatened by habitat loss. In the late nineteenth-century a syndicated article appeared in local newspapers citing the American Agriculturalist and praising the ornamental value of its foliage: "A new plant of this class is Verbesina Mameana, of the great Composite family. It was discovered in his South American explorations by Hugo A.C. Poortman in 1883. Poortman's work had been commissioned by Édouard André, who named the new species in honor of M. Mame, one of the promoters of the expedition. It grows at an altitude of four to six thousand feet, in a temperate climate. We have several native species of Verbesina; two of them in the Atlantic States, popularly known as Crownbeard; they grow six feet high, but are coarse and weedy."
