= Verbesina pentantha =

Conservation status
- Near Threatened (IUCN 3.1)

Scientific classification
- Kingdom: Plantae
- Clade: Embryophytes
- Clade: Tracheophytes
- Clade: Spermatophytes
- Clade: Angiosperms
- Clade: Eudicots
- Clade: Asterids
- Order: Asterales
- Family: Asteraceae
- Tribe: Heliantheae
- Genus: Verbesina
- Species: V. pentantha

Binomial name
- Verbesina pentantha S.F.Blake

Species of flowering plant

Verbesina pentantha is a species of flowering plant in the family Asteraceae. It is found only in Ecuador. Its natural habitats are subtropical or tripi tropi cal moist lowland forests and subtropical or tropical moist montane forests.
