= Verbesina ecuatoriana =

Conservation status
- Endangered (IUCN 3.1)

Scientific classification
- Kingdom: Plantae
- Clade: Tracheophytes
- Clade: Angiosperms
- Clade: Eudicots
- Clade: Asterids
- Order: Asterales
- Family: Asteraceae
- Tribe: Heliantheae
- Genus: Verbesina
- Species: V. ecuatoriana

Binomial name
- Verbesina ecuatoriana Sagást.

Species of flowering plant

Verbesina ecuatoriana is a species of flowering plant in the family Asteraceae. It is found only in Ecuador. Its natural habitat is subtropical or tropical high-altitude shrubland. It is threatened by habitat loss.
