= Verbesina auriculigera =

Scientific classification
- Kingdom: Plantae
- Clade: Tracheophytes
- Clade: Angiosperms
- Clade: Eudicots
- Clade: Asterids
- Order: Asterales
- Family: Asteraceae
- Tribe: Heliantheae
- Genus: Verbesina
- Species: V. auriculigera

Binomial name
- Verbesina auriculigera S.F.Blake

Species of flowering plant

Verbesina auriculigera is a species of flowering plant in the family Asteraceae. The plant grows to around 2 metres (6.6 ft) high, and has white flowers. The species is native to Peru, and was described in 1931.

== Taxonomy ==
The species was described by Sidney Fay Blake in 1931.

== Distribution ==
Verbesina auriculigera is native to Peru.

== Description ==
Verbesina auriculigera has a woody base, and grows up to 2 metres (6.6 ft) high. The stem is cylindrical, and around 1 centimetre (0.39 in) thick.

The larger leaves have 5–7 centimetres (2.0–2.8 in) long stems. The larger leaves are ovate or deltoid-ovate, 12–25 centimetres (4.7–9.8 in) long, 6–18.5 centimetres (2.4–7.3 in) wide, and have serrated edges. The smaller leaves are mostly oblong, 7.5–15 centimetres (3.0–5.9 in) long, and 2–4 centimetres (0.79–1.57 in) wide.

The inflorescence is a compound panicle. The flower stems are mostly 2–5 millimetres (0.079–0.197 in) long. The plant has four to eight white rays, and twenty-three to twenty-five disc flowers. The corolla is white.

The fruit is an achene measuring around 2.8 millimetres (0.11 in) long.
