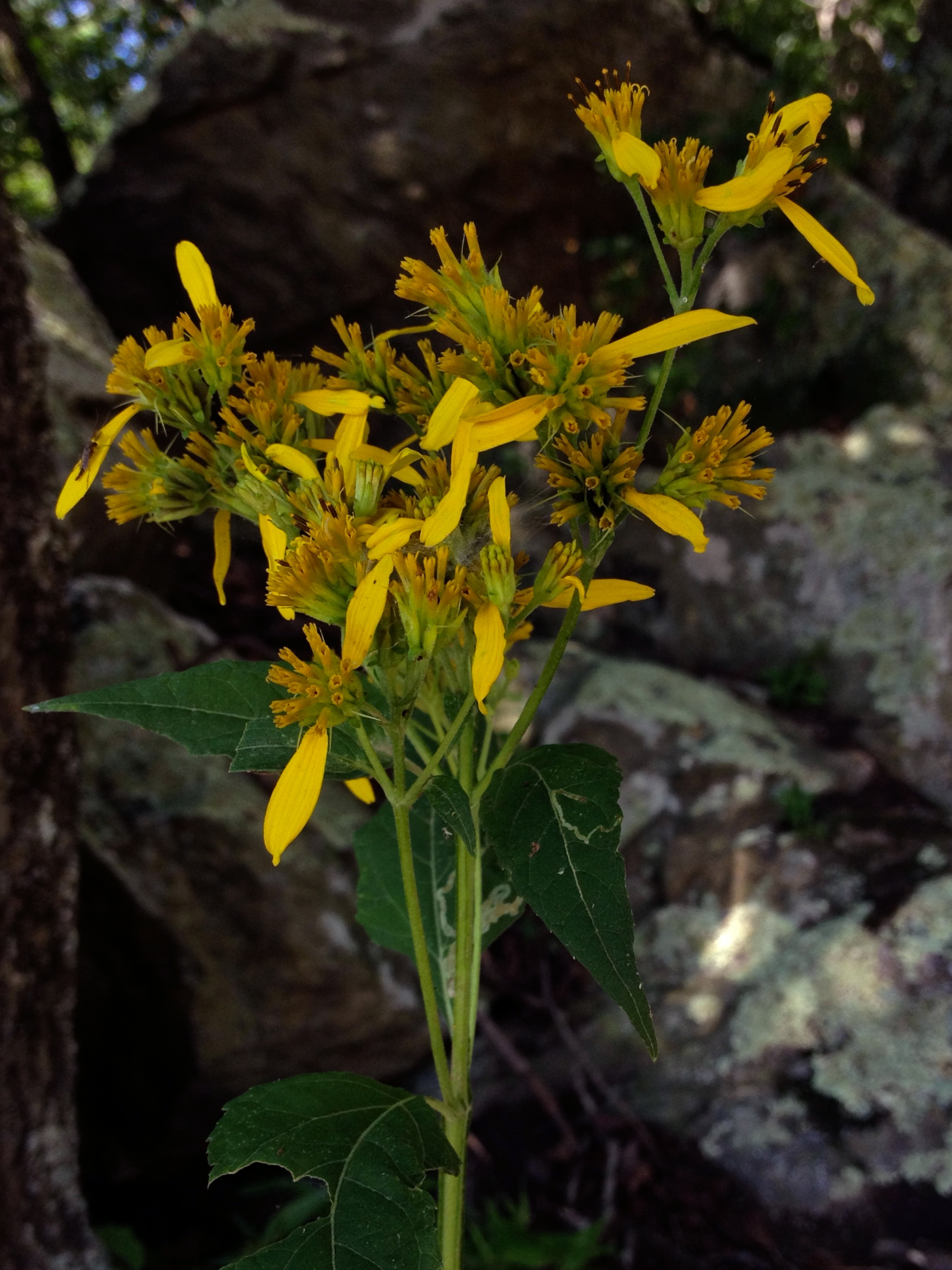

Scientific classification
- Kingdom: Plantae
- Clade: Tracheophytes
- Clade: Angiosperms
- Clade: Eudicots
- Clade: Asterids
- Order: Asterales
- Family: Asteraceae
- Genus: Verbesina
- Species: V. occidentalis

Binomial name
- Verbesina occidentalis L. (Walter)

Synonyms
- Actinomeris alata Nutt.; Coreopsis alata Cav.; Coreopsis alata Pursh nom. illeg.; Phaethusa occidentalis (L.) Britton; Sigesbeckia occidentalis L.

= Verbesina occidentalis =

Species of flowering plant

Verbesina occidentalis, commonly called yellow crownbeard and stick weed, is a flowering plant in the family Asteraceae. V. occidentalis is often considered a weedy plant of disturbed areas, due to its presence in managed agricultural areas such as hayfields.

== Description ==
Verbesina occidentalis is a perennial forb that blooms from August to October. It can grow up to 2.4 meters tall. Typical of Asteraceae, the flower head is an inflorescence consisting of 8-15 yellow disc florets and 0-5 yellow ray florets. The ray florets are sparse and are not evenly arranged around the head of the flower, giving the plant a disheveled appearance. A distinctive feature of the plant is its winged stem. The leaves are opposite in arrangement and taper towards the apex. Leaves are broad and ovate in shape with a serrated margin. They are typically 6-16 centimeters long and 3-10 centimeters wide. The leaves are glabrous.

== Distribution and habitat ==
Verbesina occidentalis prefers sunny habits. Verbesina occidentalis can live in partially sunny habitats but, it will not grow as well. The plant requires moderate amounts of moisture. Verbesina occidentalis needs the soil to be at least moderately nutrient. Verbesina occidentalis frequently occurs in pastures and hayfields. It can also be found at roadsides, fencerows, parking lots, creek sides and forested areas. Verbesina occidentalis is native to the United States. It is native to every southeastern state except for Arkansas. The range of the plant extends as far west as Texas and as far east as Delaware. The most northern state that Verbesina occidentalis is found in is Pennsylvania. The most southern state that Verbesina occidentalis is found in is Florida.

== Taxonomy ==
The genus most closely related to Verbesina is Sphagneticola. Together, Verbisina and Sphagneticola form a clade. The next most closely genera are Calyptocarpus and Eclipta.Verbesina alternifolia is the sister species.

== Ecology ==
Verbesina occidentalis has been shown to be one of the plants that is sensitive to the rising ozone levels. Due to the rising of ozone levels Verbesina occidentalis has been shown to have foliar ozone injury. Foliar ozone injury results in visible damage to the plant. Foliar ozone injury tends to be worse in more sun exposed leaves. In the Smokey Mountain National Park approximately fifty percent of the plants sampled showed symptoms of foliar ozone injury. Approximately seventeen percent of the leaves sampled were injured. The percent of plants injured increases as the elevation increases. The stippling may become more prominent in late summer. It may begin as a few stipples that are angular in shape. The coloring of the stippling may range from a light reddish-purple to black. In prolonged cases the leaves will become yellow color and may eventually die.

Verbesina occidentalis has been shown to affect the diversity of the plant community and the density of the other plants present. With the removal of Verbesina occidentalis the evenness and the Shannon diversity has been shown to increase. Shannon diversity index is a measurement of the diversity of the community. Forbs and woody plants are some the plants that are more sensitive to Verbesina occidentalis. N-fixers and grasses are also sensitive to Verbesina occidentalis.

== Control ==
Verbesina occidentalis is considered problematic for farmers. The legume and hay field farmers seem to be some of the most negatively affected by Verbesina occidentalis due to competition. In some severe cases farmers will see a reduction in crop yields. In the past natural forms of control has been used. The use of goats for control of Verbesina occidentalis is unsuccessful since the goats will not consume the plant. The most successful form of control are herbicides. Verbesina occidentalis can be controlled at a ninety three percent rate with two pints per acre of Grazon P+D herbicide. Redeem R&P herbicide was not as potent to Verbesina occidentalis. It took at least three pints of Redeem R&P to achieve the ninety three percent control rate. Crossbow 2,4-D alone would control Verbesina occidentalis up to a rate of eighty three percent. However, when Benvel herbicide is used alone the control rate for Verbesina occidentalis is less than fifty percent. There are many other herbicides that have used to control Verbesina occidentalis but, none had a profound impact.
