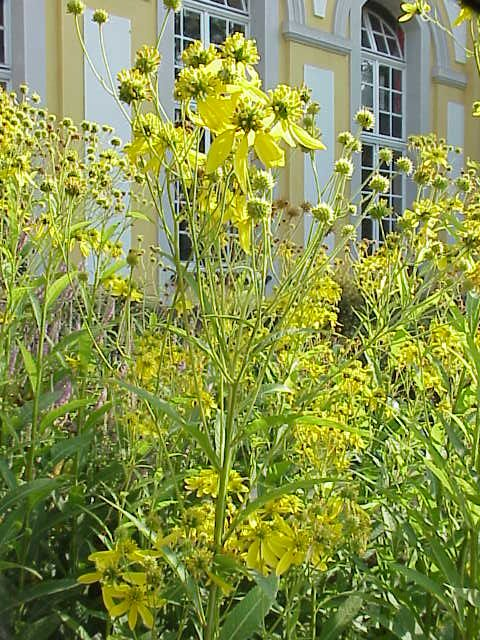
- Wingstem in cultivation

Conservation status
- Secure (NatureServe)

Scientific classification
- Kingdom: Plantae
- Clade: Tracheophytes
- Clade: Angiosperms
- Clade: Eudicots
- Clade: Asterids
- Order: Asterales
- Family: Asteraceae
- Genus: Verbesina
- Species: V. alternifolia

Binomial name
- Verbesina alternifolia Britton ex Kearney (L.)

Synonyms
- Coreopsis alternifolia L.; Actinomeris alternifolia (L.) DC; Coreopsis procera Dryand. ex Aiton; Ridan alternifolia (L.) Britton

= Verbesina alternifolia =

Species of flowering plant

Verbesina alternifolia is a species of flowering plant in the family Asteraceae. It is commonly known as wingstem or yellow ironweed. It is native to North America.

The name "wingstem" refers to the petioles of the leaves, which run down the stem and form raised ridges or "wings" along it. The plant grows 3-8 feet tall with an unbranched stem until reaching the inflorescence at the very top. Its yellow flower heads, which bloom in late summer through early fall, are 1-2 inches wide and consist of up to 10 bright yellow ray florets that are angled downward, each bearing a notch at the end, as well as a spherical cluster of tubular yellow disk florets in the center.

== Ecology ==
This plant grows in fertile, moist low-lying areas, such as near creeks and in open bottomland woods, usually not far from a body of water or woodland. The tubular disk florets in the center of every flower head attract long-tongued insects such as bumblebees and butterflies, while being less attractive to shorter-tongued insects like wasps and flies.

Verbesina alternifolia is sometimes considered weedy. It thrives and competes well in both disturbed and less disturbed habitats, and often forms colonies by spreading vegetatively from rhizomes.

The seeds are attractive food for birds. The foliage is not preferred food by deer and other herbivores.

=== As host plant ===
It is a larval host to the gold moth (Basilodes pepita) and the silvery checkerspot (Chlosyne nycteis).

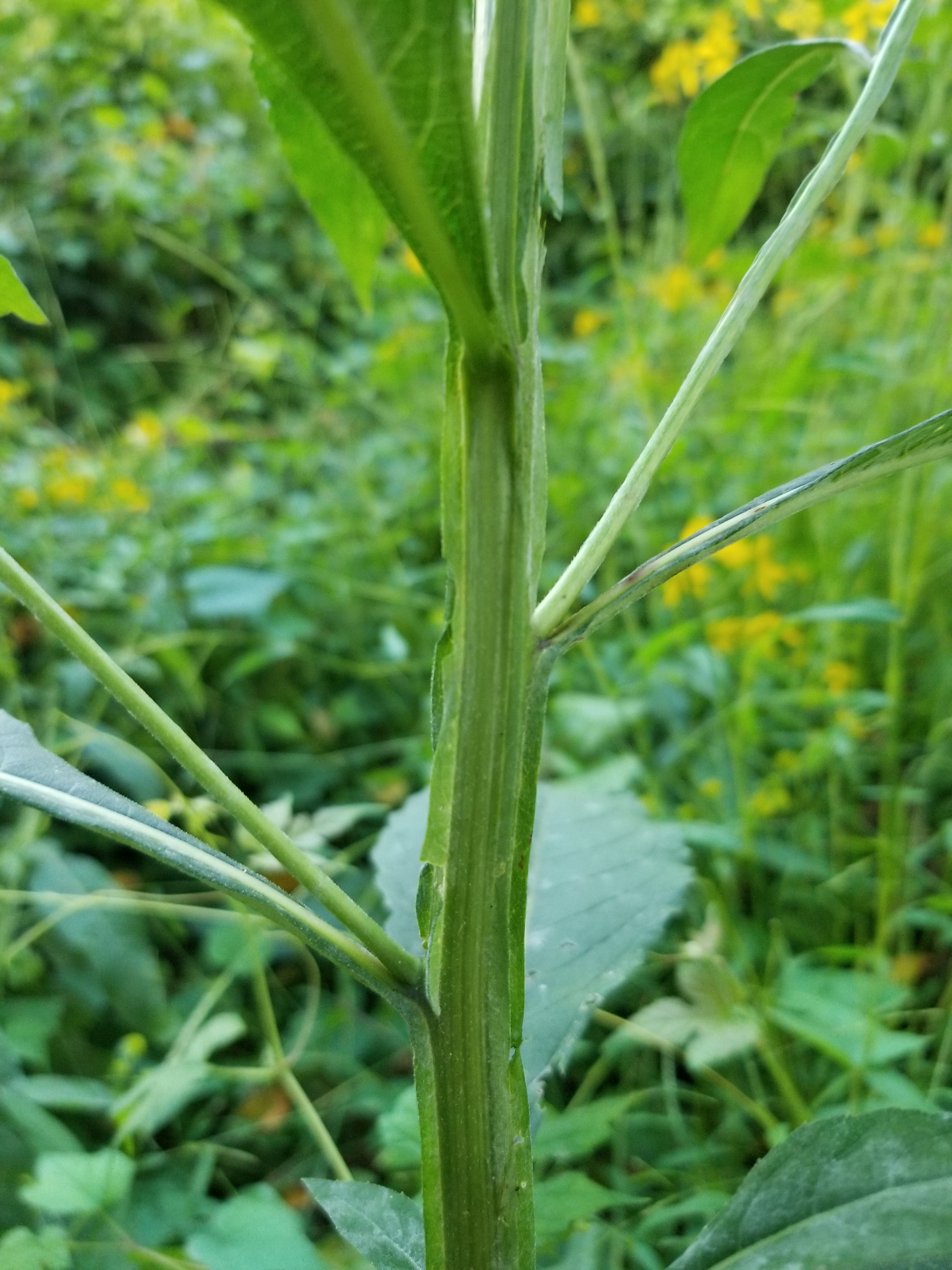
Close-up of Verbesina alternifolia stem showing wings

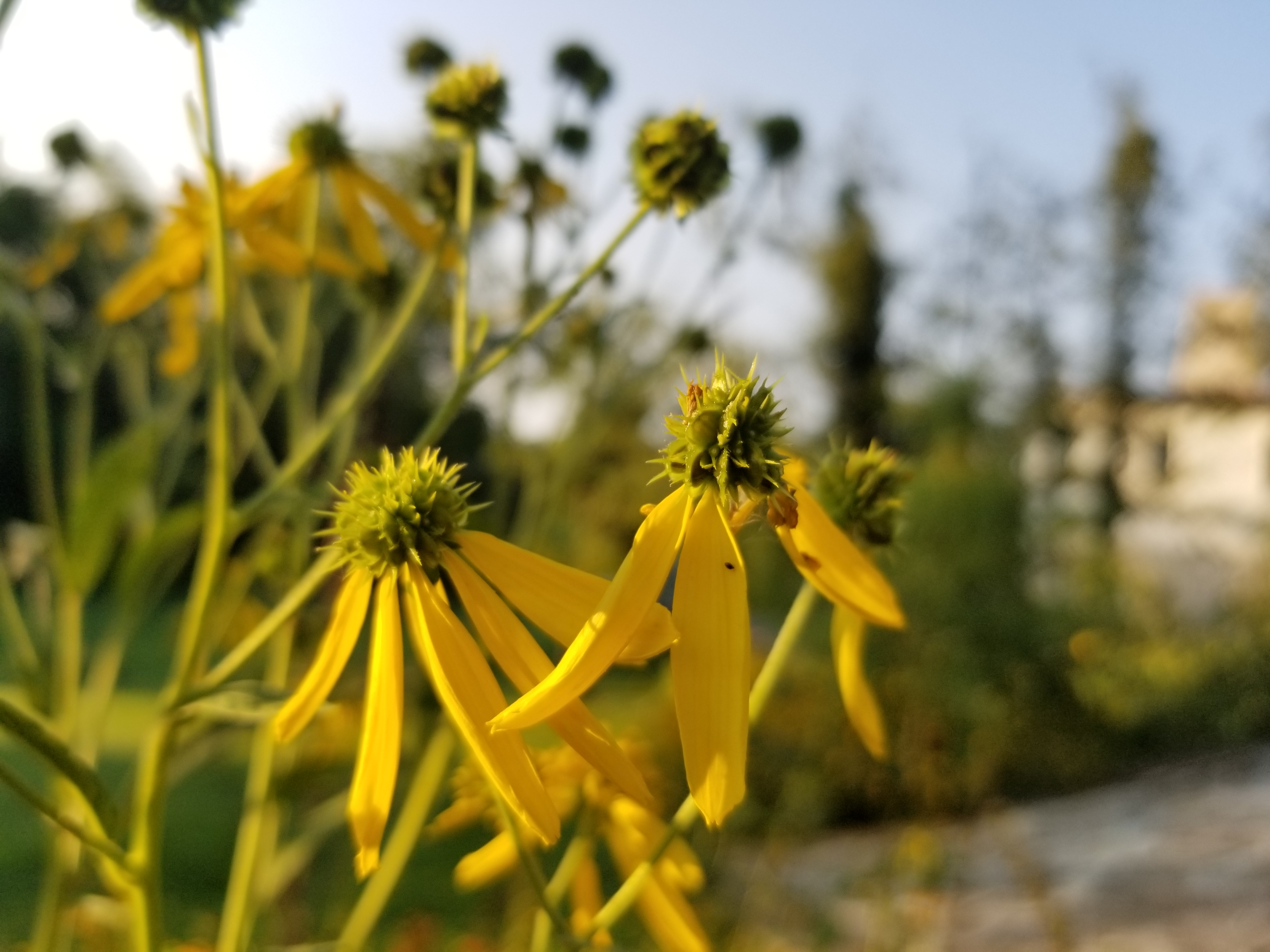
Mature flower heads

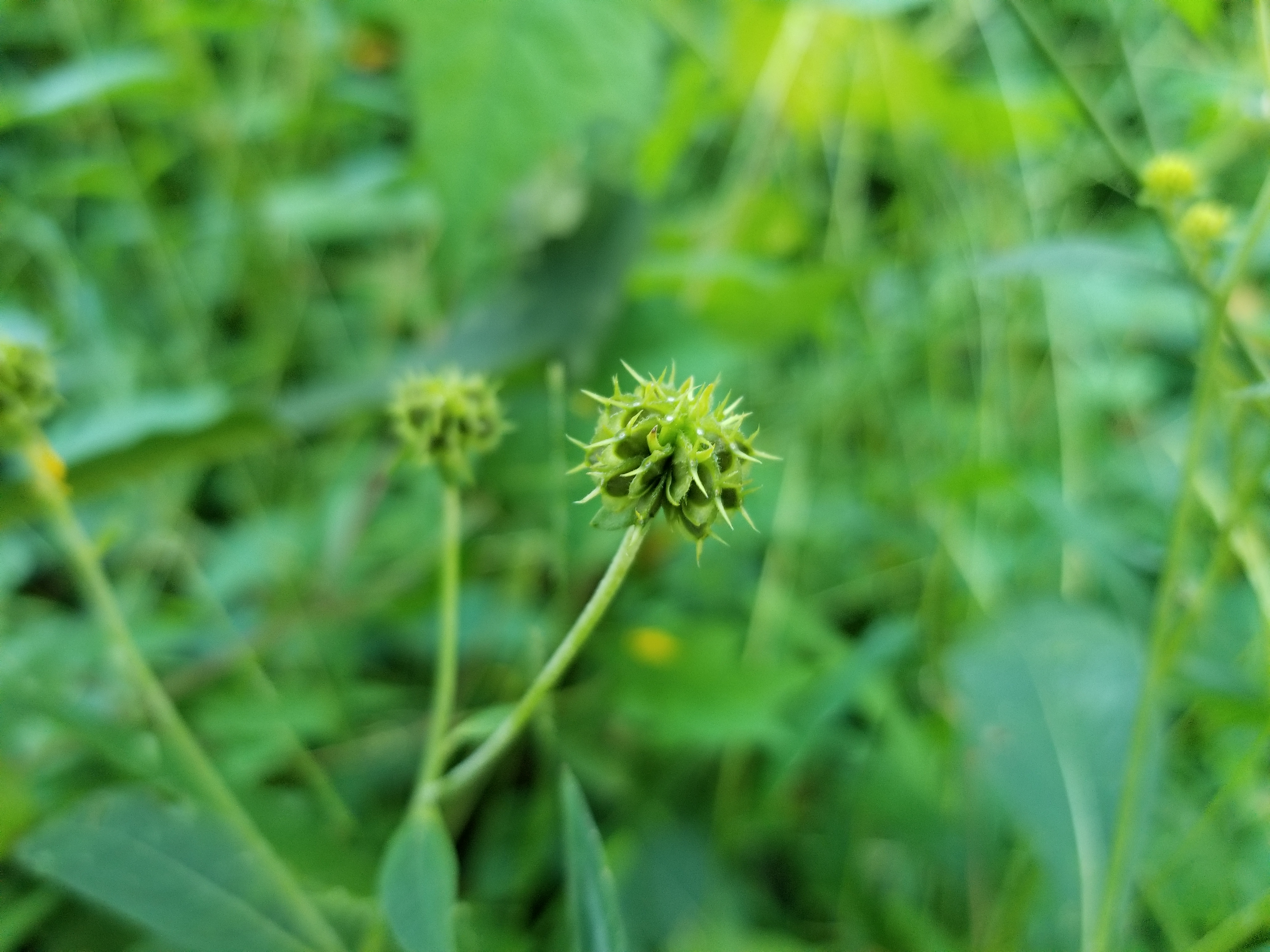
Detail of immature seed head
