= Verbesina =

Crownbeards
- Eastern carpenter bee and monarch butterfly feeding on wingstem, also called yellow ironweed Verbesina alternifolia

Scientific classification
- Kingdom: Plantae
- Clade: Tracheophytes
- Clade: Angiosperms
- Clade: Eudicots
- Clade: Asterids
- Order: Asterales
- Family: Asteraceae
- Subfamily: Asteroideae
- Tribe: Heliantheae
- Subtribe: Verbesininae
- Genus: Verbesina; L.

Type species
- Verbesina alata L.

Synonyms
- Saubinetia Remy; Anomantia Raf. ex DC.; Actimeris Raf.; Hingstonia Raf.; Achaenopodium Brand.; Platypteris Kunth; Ximenesia Cav.; Tepion Adans.; Ridan Adans.; Wootonella Standl.; Eupatoriophalacron Mill.; Ochronelis Raf.; Chaenocephalus Griseb.; Saubinetia J.Rémy; Abesina Neck.; Ditrichum Cass.; Ancistrophora A.Gray; Actinomeris Nutt.; Pterophyton Cass.; Achaenipodium Brandegee; Hamulium Cass.; Phaethusa Gaertn.

Genus of flowering plants

Verbesina, many species of which have crownbeard as part of their common names, is a genus of flowering plants, in the family Asteraceae. It is a large genus of about 350 species.

All of the species bear white or yellow flowers similar to small sunflowers. The name Verbesina very likely refers to the similarity of the foliage to that of the (unrelated) Verbena.

Verbesina species are used as food plants by the larvae of some Lepidoptera species. These include Schinia bina, which has been recorded from V. encelioides, and Schinia siren which feeds exclusively on that species.

Pollen grains from eight of the nine species of Verbesina found in Brazil have been characterized as oblate-spheroidal, medium-sized, isopolar monads. They are 3-colplorate with a subtriangular amb, a small polar area, a long colpus, a lalongate endoaperture, a caveate exine and an echinate sexine.

== Selected species ==
- Verbesina alternifolia
- Verbesina auriculigera
- Verbesina barclayae
- Verbesina brachypoda
- Verbesina chapmanii
- Verbesina dissita
- Verbesina ecuatoriana
- Verbesina encelioides
- Verbesina gigantea
- Verbesina glabrata
- Verbesina grisebachii
- Verbesina guatemalensis
- Verbesina harlingii
- Verbesina hastata
- Verbesina helianthoides
- Verbesina howardiana
- Verbesina kingii
- Verbesina latisquama
- Verbesina mameana
- Verbesina minuticeps
- Verbesina occidentalis
- Verbesina pentantha
- Verbesina persicifolia
- Verbesina petrobioides
- Verbesina pseudoclausseni
- Verbesina pustulata
- Verbesina rivetii
- Verbesina rupestris
- Verbesina saloyensis
- Verbesina squarrosa
- Verbesina subcordata
- Verbesina villonacoensis
- Verbesina virginica
