= Ironwood Springs Christian Ranch =

Coordinates: 43.845345°N 92.586465°W

- Company type: 501(c)(3) non-profit
- Founded: Stewartville, MN (1976)
- Founder: Bob Bardwell
- Headquarters: Stewartville, Minnesota
- Key people: Bob Bardwell (founder); Tracy Bashore (Executive Director) (president); Mike Enke
- Website: ironwoodsprings.com
- Footnotes / references denomination = Christian (non-denominational)

Ironwood Springs Christian Ranch (ISCR) is a Christian camp in southern Minnesota serving over 22,000 people per year. Founded by Bob Bardwell, ISCR's express purpose is to provide an atmosphere and opportunity for adults and children to get to know themselves, others and God better. Ironwood Springs has been a non-profit organization since 1976. The camp gets its name from the hundreds of Ironwood trees on the land and the boiling springs along the Root River.

== History ==
Since 1969, Bob Bardwell (wheelchair marathon racer and author) had a dream to start or work at a Christian camp when he worked at Horn Creek Ranch in Westcliffe, Colorado. God used Bob's experiences at this camp to show him the spiritual, social, and emotional impact a Christian camp can have on a child for lifetime. After leaving Horn Creek Ranch, it was Bardwell's goal to start a Christian camp of his own.

In 1973, Bardwell finished seminary and got married. That same year he was paralyzed from the waist down in a heavy construction accident. This event led to a series of changes that allowed Bob to see the Lord's purpose and plan for his life. By 1976, land that Bob's father, Lester Bardwell, had purchased was transformed into the start of a non-profit, non-denominational, independent Christian camp. "Bob's dream was realized."

- The first thing to be built was the driveway. The trails were the next thing to be developed. The current staff house was the first building built and served as the lodge with bunks and a kitchen.
- 1978 - the main lodge was built up the hill.
- 1980 to 1984 - the swimming pool, tennis courts, and the Solid Oaks Stables were built.
- 1990 - the log-dining hall that is attached to the main lodge was built.
- 1990 to 1997 - seven cabins were built.
- 1991 - the recreation center was built.
- 1995 - 80 acres (320,000 m^{2}) across the river to the north were purchased.
- 1996 to 2000 - building of the chapel with logs from Whitewater State Park.
- 1997 - two bridges were donated.
- 2001 - the main office building was opened.
- 2002 to 2005 - Castner Riding Arena.
- 2007 - the opening of the Miracle Lodge, a 3-story, 27 room lodge designed to be 100% wheelchair accessible.

== Related links ==
- Ironwood Springs Christian Ranch website
- Miracle Lodge
