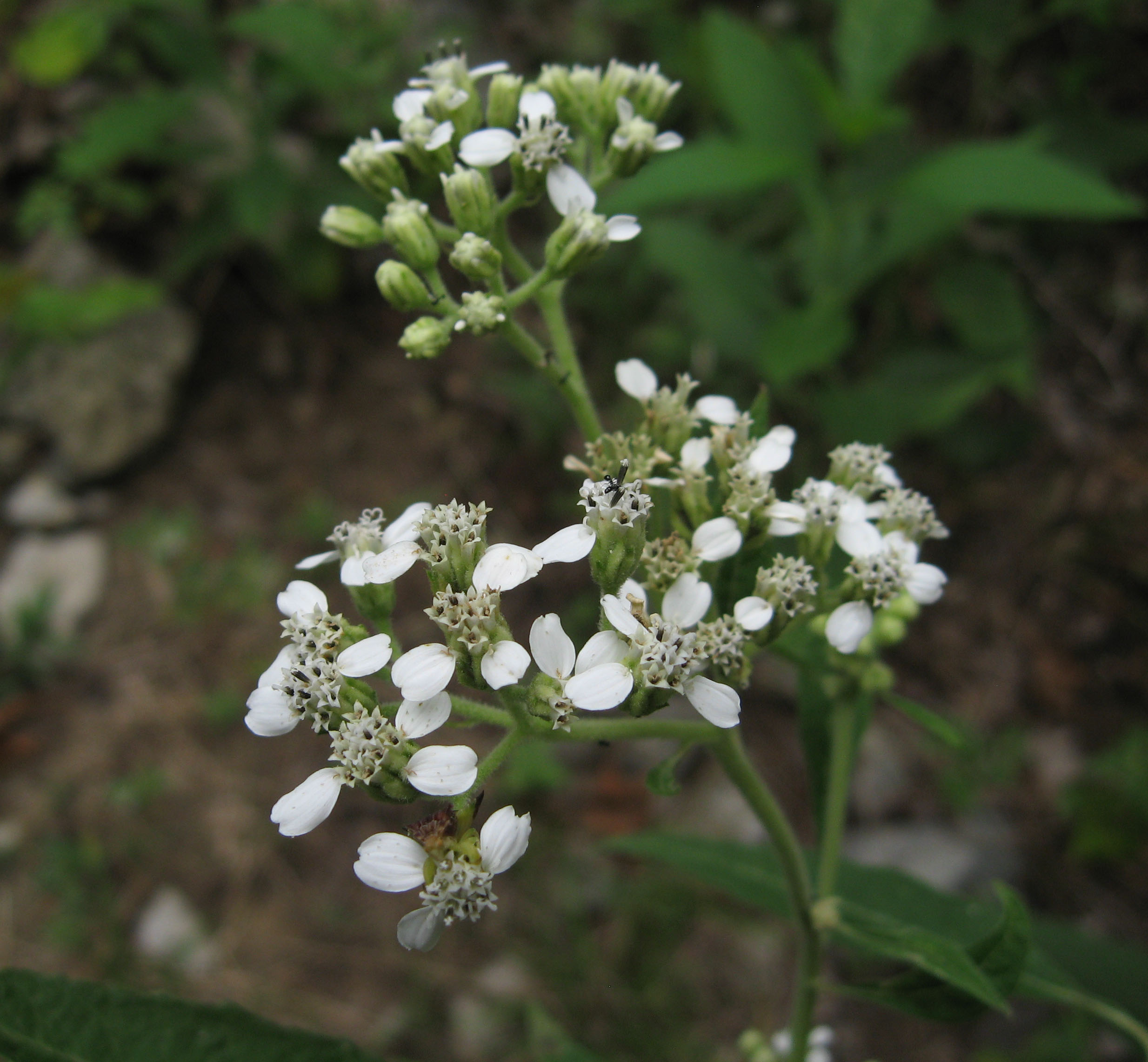

Conservation status
- Secure (NatureServe)

Scientific classification
- Kingdom: Plantae
- Clade: Tracheophytes
- Clade: Angiosperms
- Clade: Eudicots
- Clade: Asterids
- Order: Asterales
- Family: Asteraceae
- Tribe: Heliantheae
- Genus: Verbesina
- Species: V. virginica

Binomial name
- Verbesina virginica L.

= Verbesina virginica =

Species of flowering plant

Verbesina virginica, known by the common names white crownbeard, or frostweed is a species of flowering plant in the family Asteraceae. It is native to the Southeastern United States, where it is found in calcareous soil, often in bottomland thickets and edges of woods.

It is a tall perennial species. It produces heads of white flowers in late summer through fall. The name "frostweed" refers to its tendency to exude water from the base of its stems that then freeze and create ribbon-like ice structures during wintertime.

== Description ==
V. virginica grows to 2.1 metres (6.9 ft) tall with winged stalks and alternate, oval or lanceolate leaves. The leaves are up to 18 centimetres (7.1 in) long and 5.1 centimetres (2 in) wide and slightly toothed. Flower heads consist of multiple flowers arranged in a cluster, or corymb, at the terminal end of the stems. Each flower head actually consists of 1 to 5 ray florets and 8 to 15 disk florets.

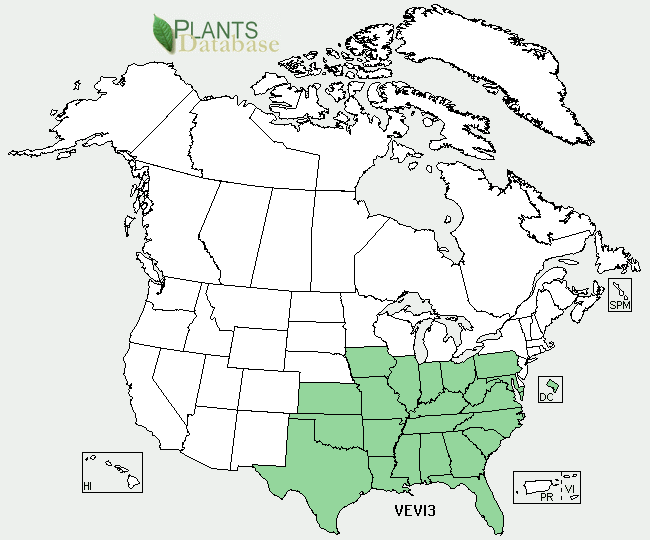
Native Distribution in the United States

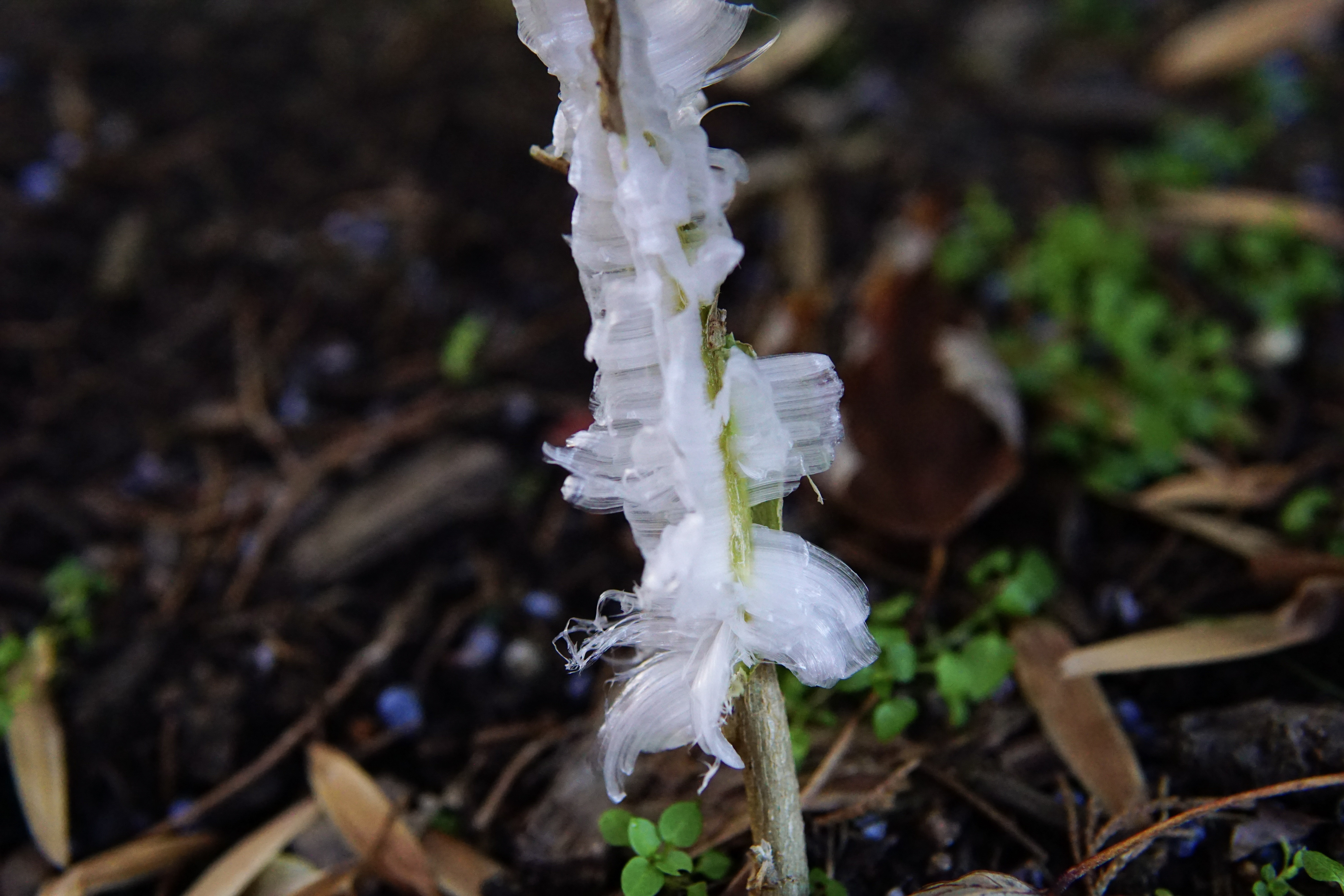
Frostweed with a frost flower

== Distribution and habitat ==
This species is endemic to a region from Iowa to Pennsylvania down the east coast to Florida's peninsula. A majority of individuals occur in Florida.

V. virginica has been observed in habitats such as mesic woodlands, slash pinewoods, floodplains, and mixed oak-pine woodlands.
