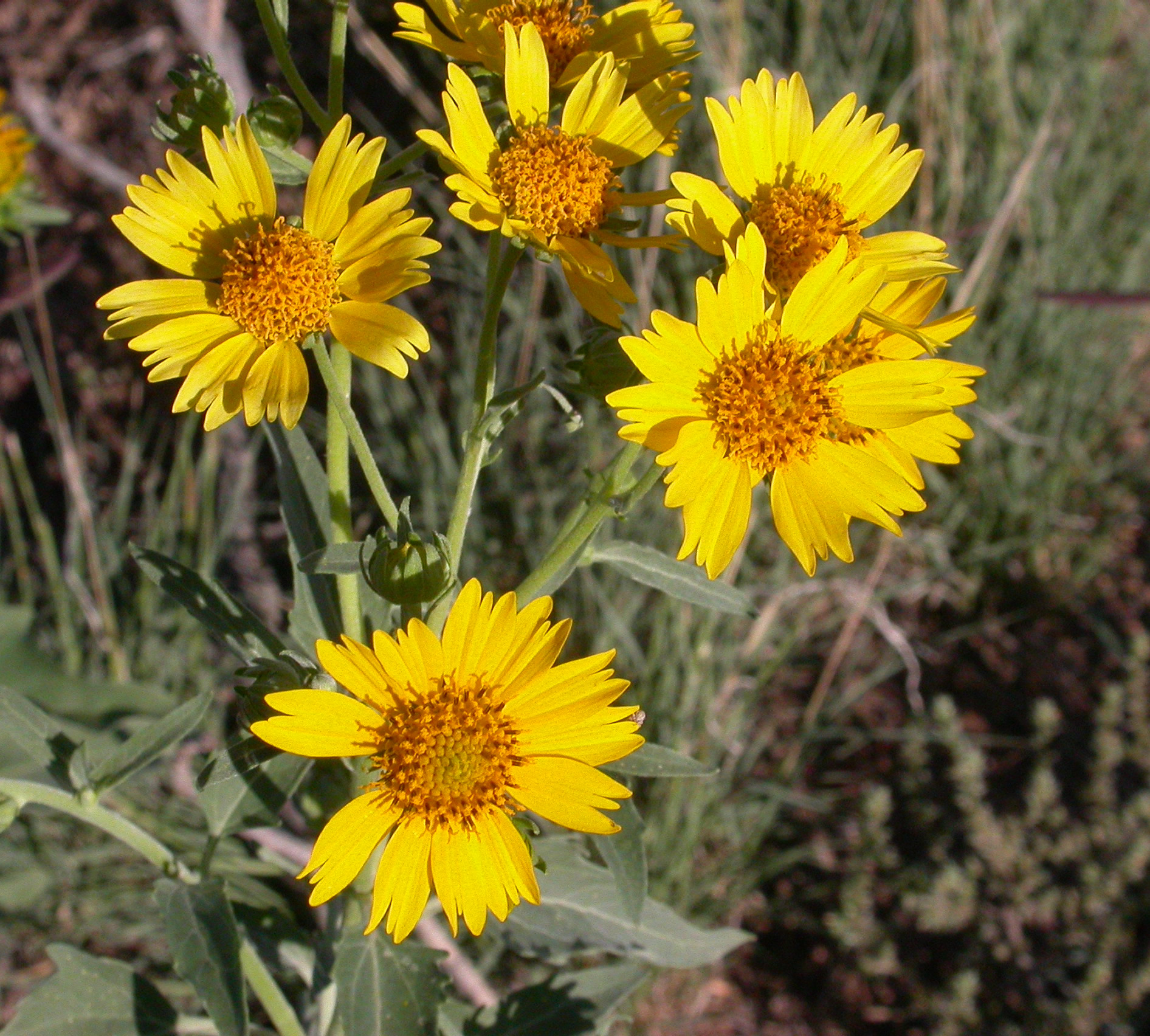
- A plant in flower near Valle, Arizona

Conservation status
- Secure (NatureServe)

Scientific classification
- Kingdom: Plantae
- Clade: Tracheophytes
- Clade: Angiosperms
- Clade: Eudicots
- Clade: Asterids
- Order: Asterales
- Family: Asteraceae
- Tribe: Heliantheae
- Genus: Verbesina
- Species: V. encelioides

Binomial name
- Verbesina encelioides (Cav.) Benth. &Hook.f. ex A.Gray

Synonyms
- Ximenesia encelioides Cav.

= Verbesina encelioides =

Species of flowering plant

Verbesina encelioides is a flowering plant in the family Asteraceae. Common names include golden crownbeard, cowpen daisy, goldweed, wild sunflower, butter daisy, crown-beard, American dogweed, and the Spanish Añil del Muerto ("indigo of the dead").

It is a summer annual with blooms resembling small sunflowers and distinctive flattened seeds. It is native to North America, growing in disturbed habitats.

== Description ==
The plant grows up to 1.5 metres (5 ft) tall. The leaves are up to 10 centimetres (4 in) long, with toothed edges. Blooming from June to September, the yellow flower head is up to 5 cm (2 in) wide.

== Distribution and habitat ==
The species is native to the Southwest United States and Northern Mexico. It is naturalized in parts of Eastern North America, the Middle East, Spain, Argentina, Australia and the Pacific islands.

The species responds strongly to disturbances on suitable sites. Like sunflowers, it produces allelopathic chemicals that slow the growth of other susceptible plant species. Research has identified an allelopathic effect on radishes which may explain its ability to dominate other species in some locations.

== Ecology ==
It is a larval host for the bordered patch.

It has become invasive in some areas, particularly in the Northwestern Hawaiian Islands within Papahanaumokuakea Marine National Monument where it impacts seabird breeding habitat.

== Uses ==
Native Americans and early settlers used the plants to treat skin disorders.
