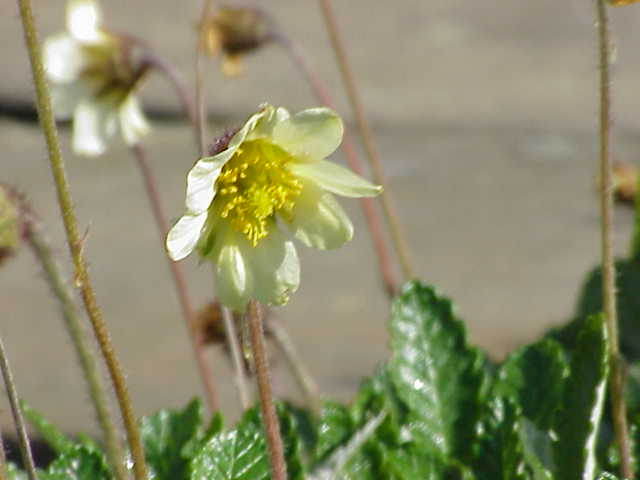
- Dryas × suendermannii

Scientific classification
- Kingdom: Plantae
- Clade: Tracheophytes
- Clade: Angiosperms
- Clade: Eudicots
- Clade: Rosids
- Order: Rosales
- Family: Rosaceae
- Subfamily: Dryadoideae
- Genus: Dryas; L.

Species
- See text

Synonyms
- Dryadaea L. ex Kuntze; Ptilotum Dulac

= Dryas (plant) =

Genus of flowering plants

Dryas is a genus of perennial cushion-forming evergreen dwarf shrubs in the family Rosaceae, native to the arctic and alpine regions of Europe, Asia and North America. The genus is named after the dryads, the tree nymphs of ancient Greek mythology. The classification of Dryas within the Rosaceae has been unclear. The genus was formerly placed in the subfamily Rosoideae, but is now placed in subfamily Dryadoideae.

The species are superficially similar to Geum (with which they share the common name avens), Potentilla, and Fragaria (strawberry). However, Dryas are distinct in having flowers with eight petals (rarely seven or up to ten), instead of the five petals found in most other genera in the Rosaceae. The flowers are erect and white with a yellow centre (Dryas integrifolia, Dryas octopetala) or pendulous and all-yellow (Dryas drummondii), and held conspicuously above the small plants. This makes them very popular in rockeries and alpine gardens. The hybrid Dryas × suendermannii, with cream coloured flowers, has gained the Royal Horticultural Society's Award of Garden Merit.

Dryas tolerates a wide variety of unshaded habitats, including alpine situations with sand or gravel substrate, similar substrates in flat tundra lowlands, and also fen habitats upon organic substrate where some shading from adjacent sedges or shrubs may occur.

The Younger Dryas and Older Dryas stadials are geological periods of cold temperature that are named after Dryas octopetala, which flourished during that time and is used as a fossil indicator of those periods.

== Gallery ==
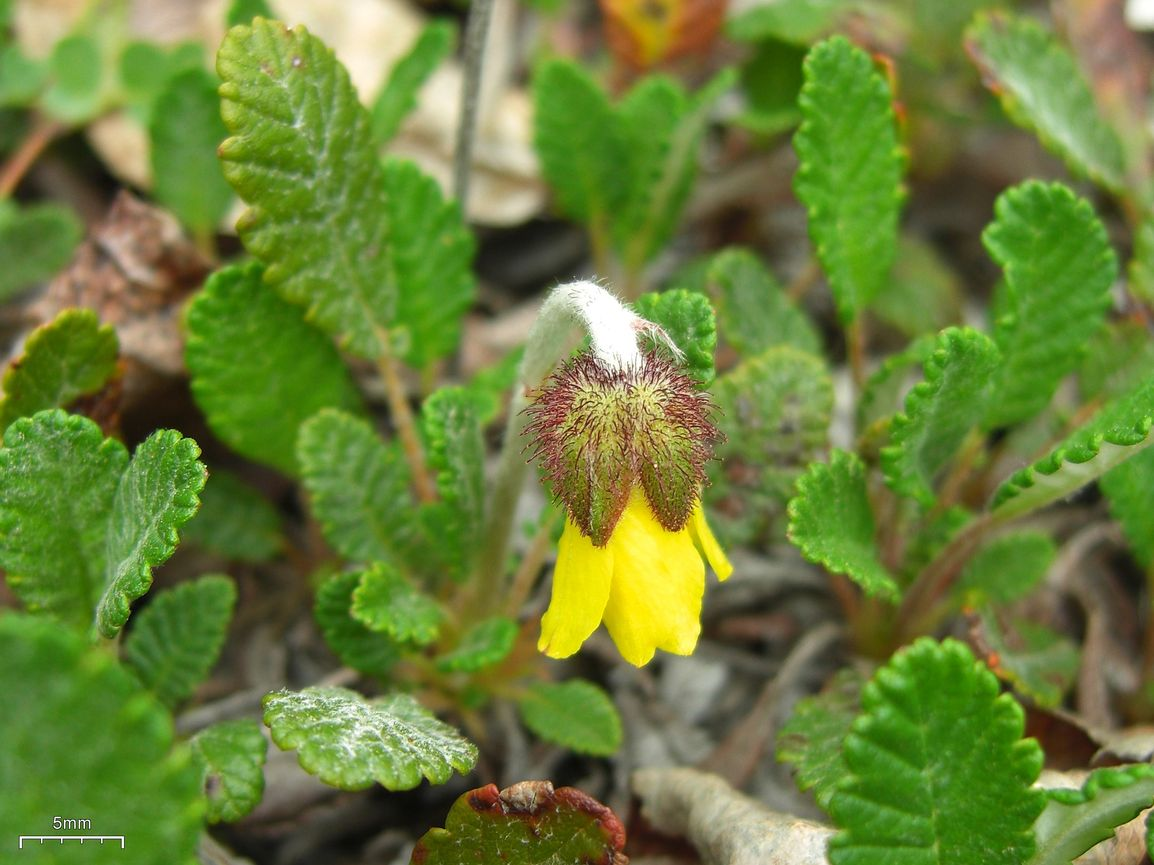
Dryas drummondii – Drummond's avens

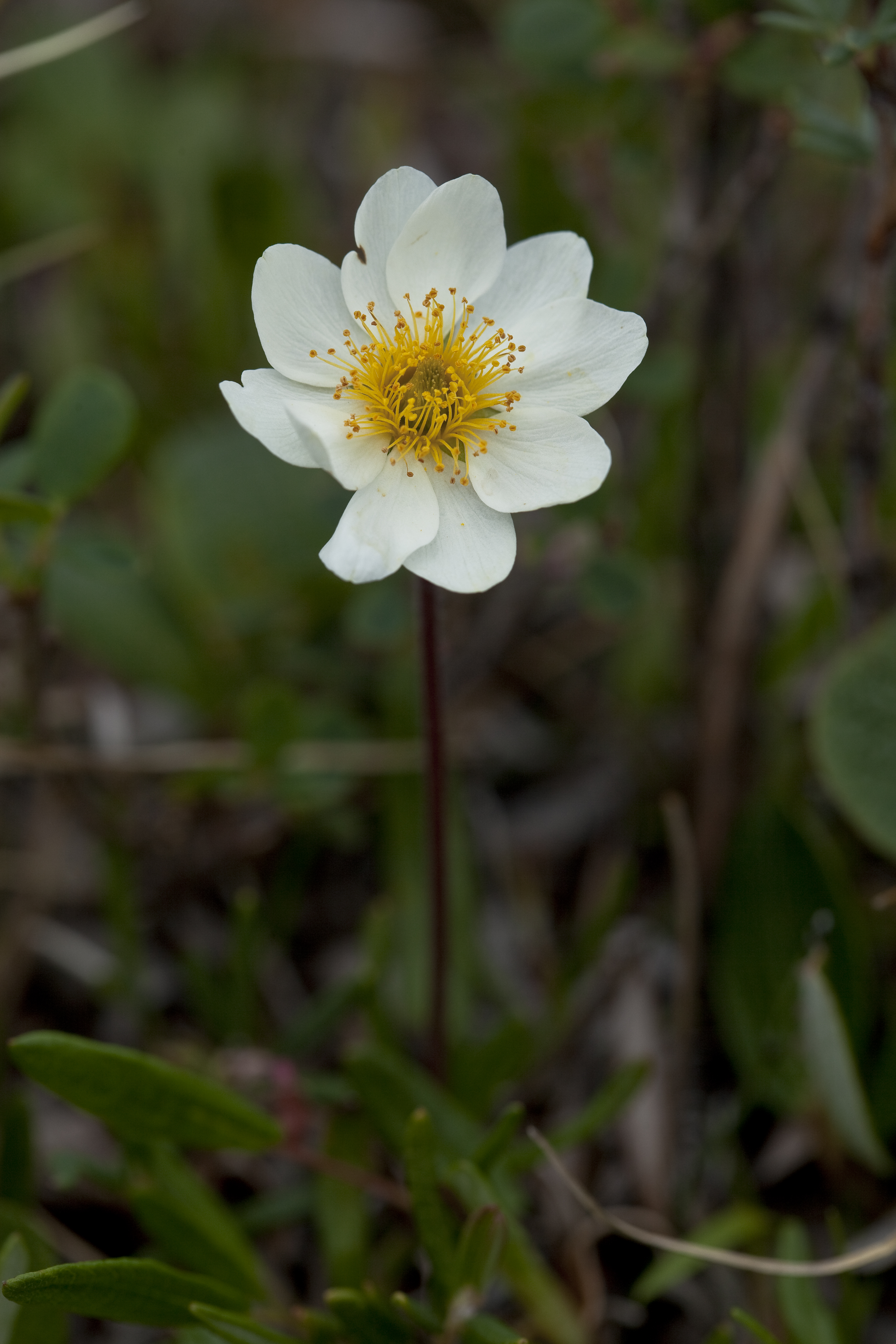
Dryas integrifolia – entire-leaved avens

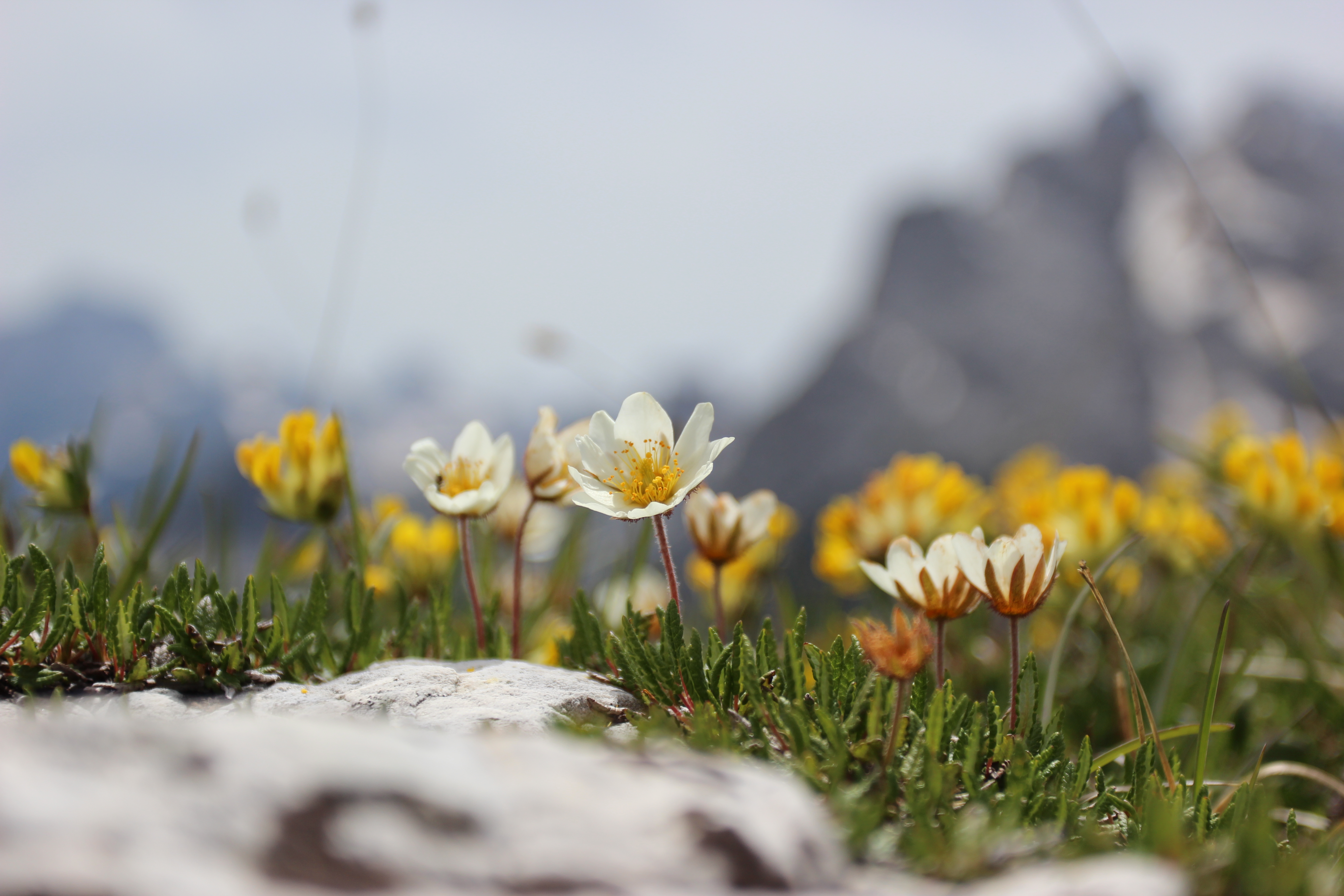
Dryas octopetala – mountain avens

== Taxonomy ==
=== Species ===
Dryas comprises three species, but the genus is in need of taxonomic revision:

- Dryas drummondii Richardson ex Hook. – Drummond's avens
  - var. drummondii Richardson ex Hook. – Yellow avens
  - var. tomentosa (Farr) L.O. Williams – Tomentose avens
- Dryas integrifolia Vahl – Entire-leaved avens
  - subsp. chamissonis (Spreng.) Scoggan – White avens
  - subsp. crenulata (Juz.) J. Kozhevn – Crenulate avens
  - subsp. integrifolia Vahl – Entire-leaved avens
  - subsp. sylvatica (Hultén) Hultén – Forest avens
- Dryas octopetala L. – Mountain avens
  - subsp. alaskensis (A.E. Porsild) Hultén – Alaskan avens
  - subsp. hookeriana (Juz.) Hultén – Hooker's avens
  - subsp. octopetala L. – Eight-petal avens
    - var. angustifolia C.L. Hitchc. – Narrow-leaved avens
    - var. argentea Blytt – Silvery avens
    - var. kamtschatica (Juz.) Hultén – Kamtschatca avens
    - var. octopetala L. – Eight-petal avens
  - subsp. punctata (Juz.) Hultén – Pointed avens

=== Species names with uncertain taxonomic status ===
The status of the following species is unresolved:

- Dryas camschatica Juz.
- Dryas dasypetala Juz.
- Dryas grandis Juz.
- Dryas henricae Juz.
- Dryas incisa Juz.
- Dryas integrifolia C.A.Mey. ex Juz.
- Dryas integrifolia Ledeb.
- Dryas kamtschatica Juz.
- Dryas longifolia C.A.Mey. ex Juz.
- Dryas octopetala J.G.Gmel.
- Dryas octopetala M.Bieb.
- Dryas octopetala Makino
- Dryas oxyodonta Juz.
- Dryas sumneviczii Serg.
- Dryas viscosa Juz.

=== Hybrids ===
Two hybrids have been described:

- Dryas × suendermannii Kellerer ex Sundermann—(D. drummondii × D. octopetala)
- Dryas × wyssiana Beauverd—(D. drummondii × D. integrifolia)

=== Species names with uncertain taxonomic status ===
The status of the following hybrids is unresolved:

- Dryas × chamissonis Jurtzev
- Dryas × grandiformis Jurtzev
- Dryas × intermedia Juz.
- Dryas × lewinii Rouleau

== Nitrogen fixation ==
Some Dryas plants have root nodules that host the nitrogen-fixing bacterium Frankia.

- Dryas drummondii forms root nodules and fixes nitrogen with Frankia.
- Dryas integrifolia does not form root nodules or fix nitrogen with Frankia.
- Dryas octopetala does not form root nodules or fix nitrogen with Frankia.
- Dryas × suendermannii (D. drummondii × D. octopetala) does not form root nodules or fix nitrogen with Frankia.
