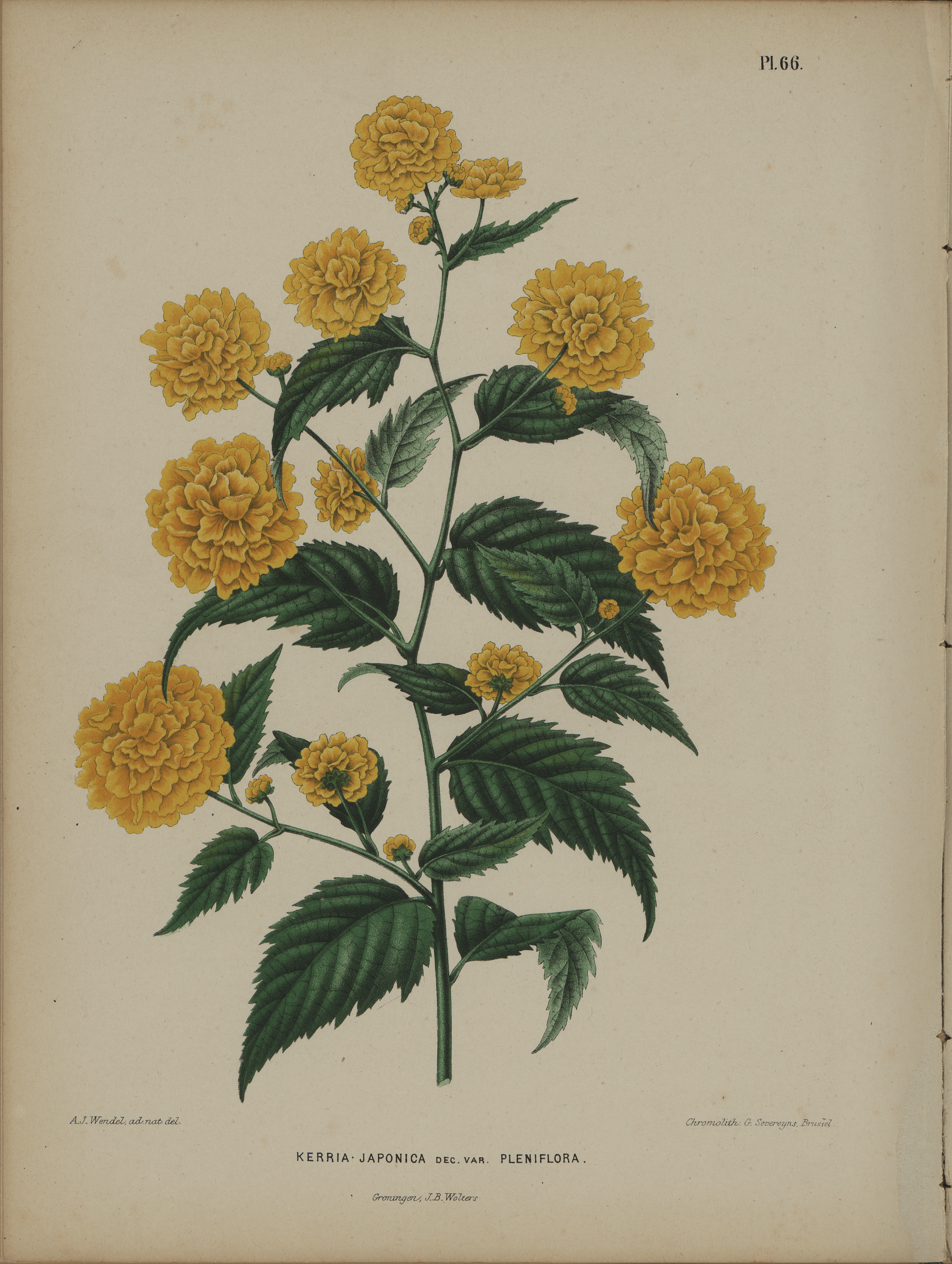
- Kerria japonica

Scientific classification
- Kingdom: Plantae
- Clade: Tracheophytes
- Clade: Angiosperms
- Clade: Eudicots
- Clade: Rosids
- Order: Rosales
- Family: Rosaceae
- Subfamily: Amygdaloideae
- Tribe: Kerrieae

= Kerrieae =

Tribe of plants

Kerrieae is a tribe of the rose family, Rosaceae, belonging to the subfamily Amygdaloideae.

Kerrieae genera include

- Coleogyne Torr.
- Kerria DC.
- Neviusia A. Gray
- Rhodotypos Siebold & Zucc.
