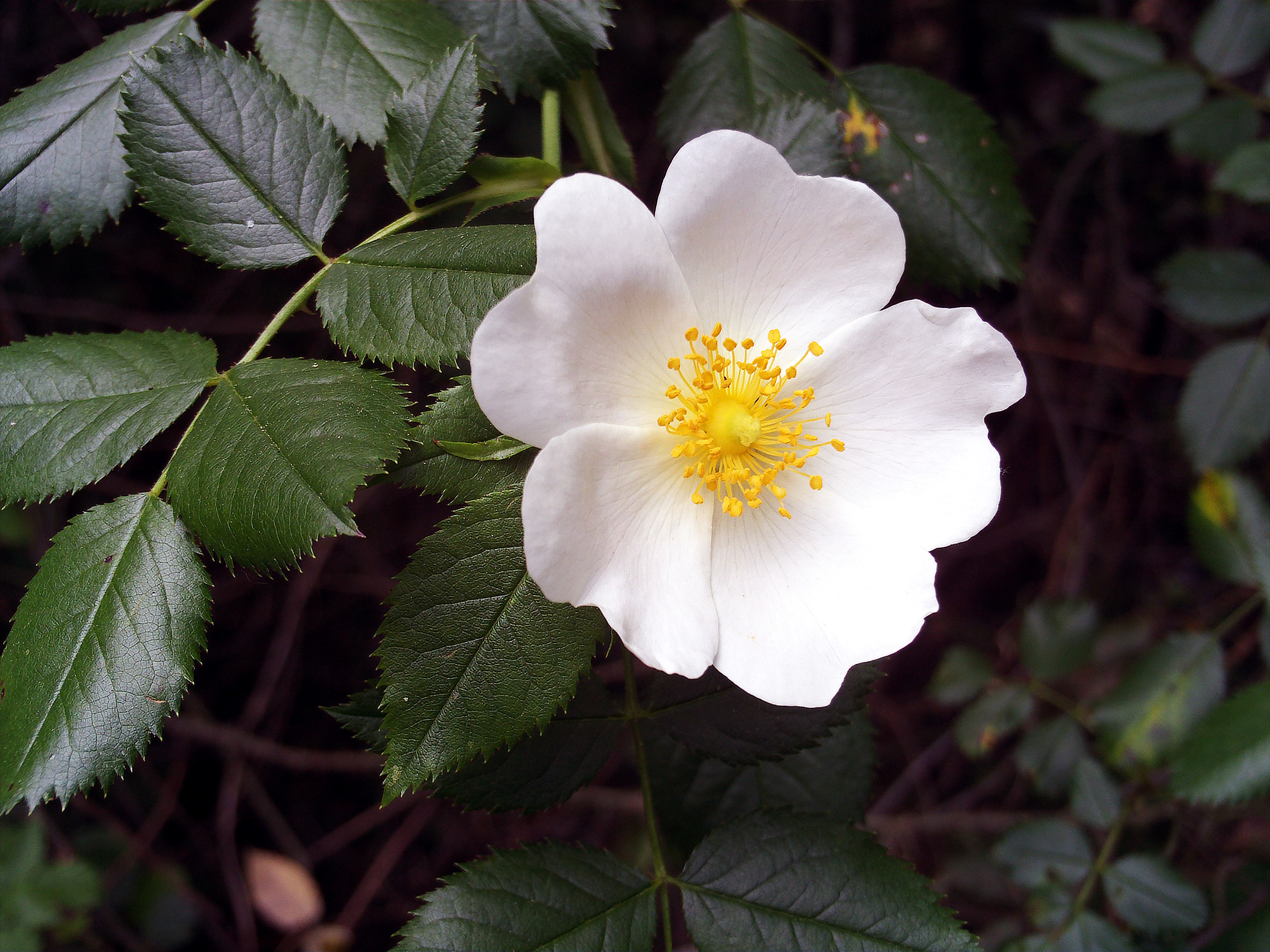
- Flower of Rosa pouzinii

Scientific classification
- Kingdom: Plantae
- Clade: Tracheophytes
- Clade: Angiosperms
- Clade: Eudicots
- Clade: Rosids
- Order: Rosales
- Family: Rosaceae; Juss.

Subfamilies
- Amygdaloideae; Dryadoideae; Rosoideae
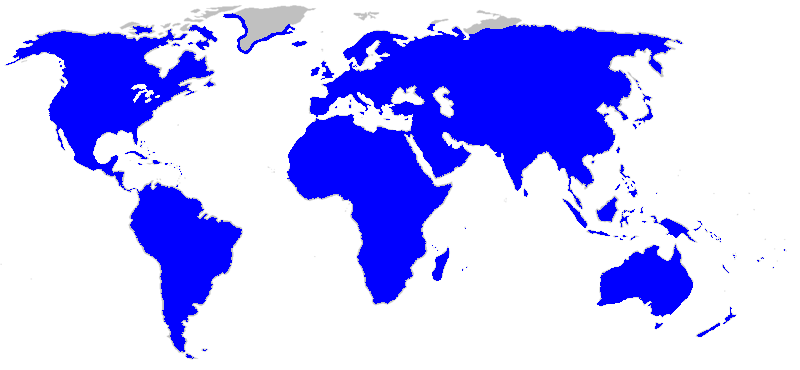
- Global distribution of Rosaceae

Synonyms
- Amygdalaceae D. Don 1825; Coleogynaceae J. Agardh 1858; Fragariaceae Richard ex Nestler 1816; Lindleyaceae J. Agardh 1858; Malaceae Small ex Britton 1903; Pomaceae Lindl.; Potentillaceae Sprengel ex Weinmann 1824; Prunaceae Martinov; Spiraeaceae Bertuch 1801

= Rosaceae =

Rosaceae Temporal range: Turonian - present Possible Albian record

Rose family of flowering plants

Rosaceae (/roʊˈzeɪsi.iː, -ˌaɪ, -ˌeɪ/), the rose family, is a family of flowering plants that includes 4,828 known species in 91 genera.

The name is derived from the type genus Rosa. The family includes herbs, shrubs, and trees. Most species are deciduous, but some are evergreen. They have a worldwide range but are most diverse in the Northern Hemisphere.

Many economically important products come from the Rosaceae, including various edible fruits, such as apples, pears, quinces, apricots, plums, cherries, peaches, raspberries, blackberries, loquats, strawberries, rose hips, hawthorns, and almonds. The family also includes popular ornamental trees and shrubs, such as roses, meadowsweets, rowans, firethorns, and photinias.

Among the most species-rich genera in the family are Alchemilla (270), Sorbus (260), Crataegus (260), Cotoneaster (260), Rubus (250), and Prunus (340), which contains plums, cherries, peaches, apricots, and almonds. However, all of these numbers should be seen as estimates—much taxonomic work remains.

== Description ==
Rosaceae can be woody trees, shrubs, climbers or herbaceous plants. The herbs are mostly perennials, but some annuals also exist, such as Alchemilla arvensis.

=== Leaves ===
The leaves are generally arranged spirally, but have an opposite arrangement in some species. They can be simple or pinnately compound (either odd- or even-pinnate). Compound leaves appear in around 30 genera. The leaf margin is most often serrate. Paired stipules are generally present and are considered a primitive feature within the family, though they have been independently lost in many groups of Amygdaloideae (previously called Spiraeoideae). The stipules are sometimes adnate (attached surface to surface) to the petiole. Glands or extrafloral nectaries may be present on leaf margins or petioles. Spines may be present on the midrib of leaflets and the rachis of compound leaves.

=== Flowers ===
Flowers of plants in the rose family are generally described as "showy". They are radially symmetrical, and almost always hermaphroditic. Rosaceae generally have five sepals, five petals, and many spirally arranged stamens. The bases of the sepals, petals, and stamens are fused together to form a characteristic cup-like structure called a hypanthium. They can be arranged in spikes, or heads. Solitary flowers are rare. Rosaceae have a variety of color petals, but blue is almost completely absent.

=== Fruits and seeds ===
The fruits occur in many varieties and were once considered the main characters for the definition of subfamilies amongst Rosaceae, giving rise to a fundamentally artificial subdivision. They can be follicles, capsules, nuts, achenes, drupes (Prunus), and accessory fruits, like the pome of an apple, the hip of a rose, or the receptacle-derived aggregate accessory fruit of a strawberry. Many fruits of the family are edible, but their seeds often contain amygdalin, which can release cyanide during digestion if the seed is damaged.

== Taxonomy ==
=== Taxonomic history ===
The family was traditionally divided into six subfamilies: Rosoideae, Spiraeoideae, Maloideae (Pomoideae), Amygdaloideae (Prunoideae), Neuradoideae, and Chrysobalanoideae, and most of these were treated as families by various authors. Later (1971), Chrysobalanoideae was placed in Malpighiales and Neuradoideae has been assigned to Malvales. Schulze-Menz, in Engler's Syllabus edited by Melchior (1964), recognized Rosoideae, Dryadoideae, Lyonothamnoideae, Spireoideae, Amygdaloideae, and Maloideae. They were primarily diagnosed by the structure of the fruits. More recent work has identified that not all of these groups were monophyletic. Hutchinson (1964) and Kalkman (2004) recognized only tribes (17 and 21, respectively). Takhtajan (1997) delimited 21 tribes in 10 subfamilies: Filipenduloideae, Rosoideae, Ruboideae, Potentilloideae, Coleogynoideae, Kerroideae, Amygdaloideae (Prunoideae), Spireoideae, Maloideae (Pyroideae), Dichotomanthoideae. A more modern model comprises three subfamilies, one of which (Rosoideae) has largely remained the same.

While the boundaries of the Rosaceae are not disputed, there is no general agreement as to how many genera it contains. Areas of divergent opinion include the treatment of Potentilla s.l. and Sorbus s.l.. Compounding the problem is that apomixis is common in several genera. This results in an uncertainty in the number of species contained in each of these genera, due to the difficulty of dividing apomictic complexes into species. For example, Cotoneaster contains between 70 and 300 species, Rosa around 100 (including the taxonomically complex dog roses), Sorbus 100 to 200 species, Crataegus between 200 and 1,000, Alchemilla around 300 species, Potentilla roughly 500, and Rubus hundreds, or possibly even thousands of species.

=== Genera ===
Identified clades include:

- Subfamily Rosoideae: Traditionally composed of those genera bearing aggregate fruits that are made up of small achenes or drupelets, and often the fleshy part of the fruit (e.g. strawberry) is the receptacle or the stalk bearing the carpels. The circumscription is now narrowed (excluding, for example, the Dryadoideae), but it still remains a diverse group containing five or six tribes and 20 or more genera, including rose, Rubus (blackberry, raspberry), Fragaria (strawberry), Potentilla, and Geum.
- Subfamily Amygdaloideae: Within this group remains an identified clade with a pome fruit, traditionally known as subfamily Maloideae (or Pyroideae) which included genera such as Malus (apple), Cotoneaster, and Crataegus (hawthorn). To separate it at the subfamily level would leave the remaining genera as a paraphyletic group, so it has been expanded to include the former Spiraeoideae and Amygdaloideae. The subfamily has sometimes been referred to by the name "Spiraeoideae", but this is not permitted by the International Code of Nomenclature for algae, fungi, and plants.
- Subfamily Dryadoideae: Fruits are achenes with hairy styles, and includes five genera (Dryas, Cercocarpus, Chamaebatia, Cowania, and Purshia), most species of which form root nodules which host nitrogen-fixing bacteria from the genus Frankia.

=== Phylogeny ===
The phylogenetic relationships between the three subfamilies within Rosaceae are unresolved. There are three competing hypotheses:

Amygdaloideae basal

- - Amygdaloideae
  - - Rosoideae
    - Dryadoideae

Dryadoideae basal

- - Dryadoideae
  - - Amygdaloideae
    - Rosoideae

Rosoideae basal

- - Rosoideae
  - - Dryadoideae
    - Amygdaloideae

==== Amygdaloideae basal ====
Amygdaloideae has been identified as the earliest branching subfamily by Chin et al. (2014), Li et al. (2015), Li et al. (2016), and Sun et al. (2016). Most recently Zhang et al. (2017) recovered these relationships using whole plastid genomes:

- - Rosaceae
    - Amygdaloideae
      - - - - - - Malodae
                  - Maleae
                  - Gillenieae
                - Spiraeeae
              - Sorbarieae
            - Amygdaleae
          - Kerriodae
            - Kerrieae
            - Exochordeae
        - Neillieae
      - Lyonothamneae
    - - Rosoideae
        - Rosodae
          - - - - Potentilleae
                - Roseae
              - Agrimonieae
            - Rubeae
          - Colurieae
        - Ulmarieae
      - Dryadoideae
        Dryadeae
  - outgroup

The sister relationship between Dryadoideae and Rosoideae is supported by the following shared morphological characters not found in Amygdaloideae: presence of stipules, separation of the hypanthium from the ovary, and the fruits are usually achenes.

==== Dryadoideae basal ====
Dryadoideae has been identified as the earliest branching subfamily by Evans et al. (2002) and Potter (2003). Most recently Xiang et al. (2017) recovered these relationships using nuclear transcriptomes:

- - Rosaceae
    - - Amygdaloideae
        - - - - Malodae
                - Maleae
                - Gillenieae
              - - Kerriodae
                  - Kerrieae
                  - Exochordeae
                - Sorbarieae
            - - Amygdaleae
              - Lyonothamneae
          - Spiraeeae
        - Neillieae
      - Rosoideae
        - Rosodae
          - - - - Agrimonieae
                - Potentilleae
              - Roseae
            - Colurieae
          - Rubeae
        - Ulmarieae
    - Dryadoideae
      Dryadeae
  - outgroup

==== Rosoideae basal ====
Rosoideae has been identified as the earliest branching subfamily by Morgan et al. (1994), Evans (1999), Potter et al. (2002), Potter et al. (2007), Töpel et al. (2012), and Chen et al. (2016). The following is taken from Potter et al. (2007):

- - Rosaceae
    - Rosoideae
      - Rosodae
        - - - Agrimonieae
            - - Potentilleae
              - Roseae
          - Colurieae
        - Rubeae
      - Ulmarieae
    - - Amygdaloideae
        - - - - Sorbarieae
              - - Malodae
                  - Maleae
                  - Gillenieae
                - Spiraeeae
            - Kerriodae
              - Kerrieae
              - Exochordeae
          - - Amygdaleae
            - Neillieae
        - Lyonothamneae
      - Dryadoideae
        Dryadeae
  - outgroup

The sister relationship between Amygdaloideae and Dryadoideae is supported by the following shared biochemical characters not found in Rosoideae: production of cyanogenic glycosides and production of sorbitol.

== Distribution and habitat ==
The Rosaceae have a cosmopolitan distribution, being found nearly everywhere except for Antarctica. They are primarily concentrated in the Northern Hemisphere in regions that are not desert or tropical rainforest.

== Uses ==
The rose family is considered one of the six most economically important crop plant families, and includes apples, pears, quinces, medlars, loquats, almonds, peaches, apricots, plums, cherries, strawberries, blackberries, raspberries, sloes, and roses.

Many genera are also highly valued ornamental plants. These include trees and shrubs (Aronia, Cotoneaster, Chaenomeles, Crataegus, Dasiphora, Exochorda, Kerria, Photinia, Physocarpus, Prunus, Pyracantha, Rhodotypos, Rosa, Sorbus, Spiraea), herbaceous perennials (Alchemilla, Aruncus, Filipendula, Geum, Potentilla, Sanguisorba), alpine plants (Dryas, Geum, Potentilla) and climbers (Rosa).

However, several genera are also introduced noxious weeds in some parts of the world, costing money to be controlled. These invasive plants can have negative impacts on the diversity of local ecosystems once established. Such naturalised pests include Acaena, Cotoneaster, Crataegus, and Pyracantha.

In Bulgaria and parts of western Asia, the production of rose oil from fresh flowers such as Rosa damascena, Rosa gallica, and other species is an important economic industry.

== Gallery ==
The family Rosaceae covers a wide range of trees, bushes and plants.

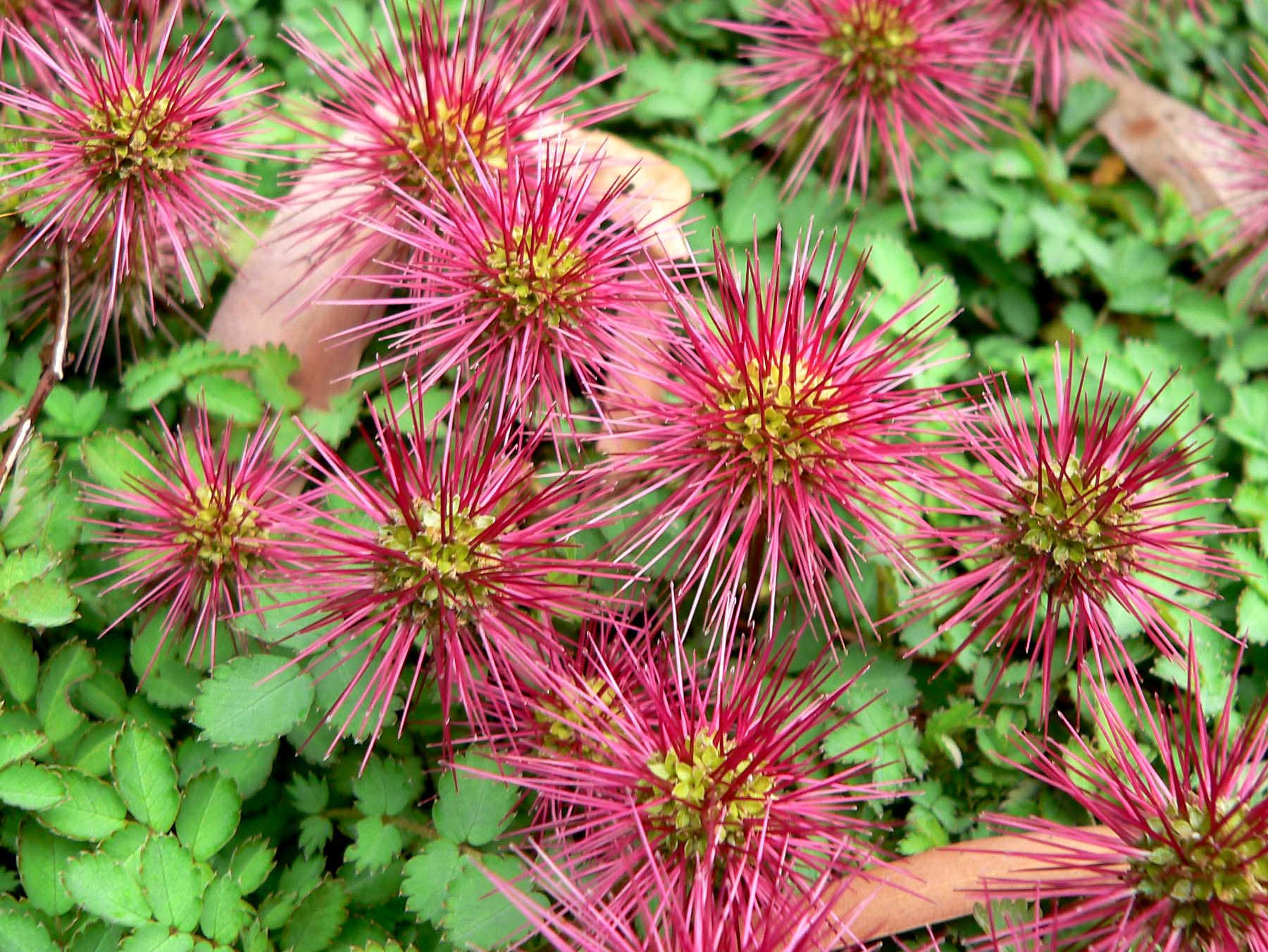
Buzzy burr (Acaena magellanica)

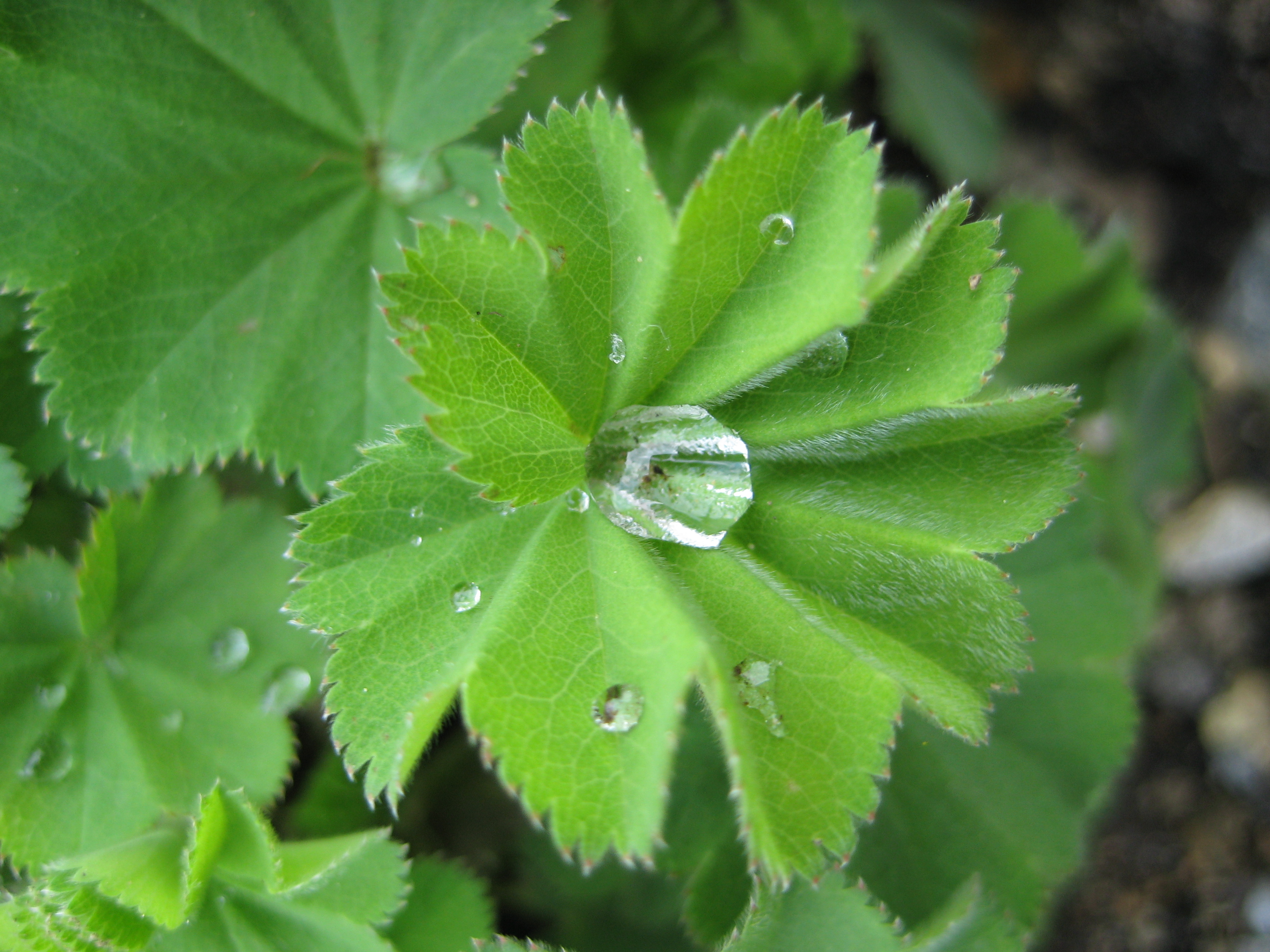
Common lady's mantle (Alchemilla vulgaris)

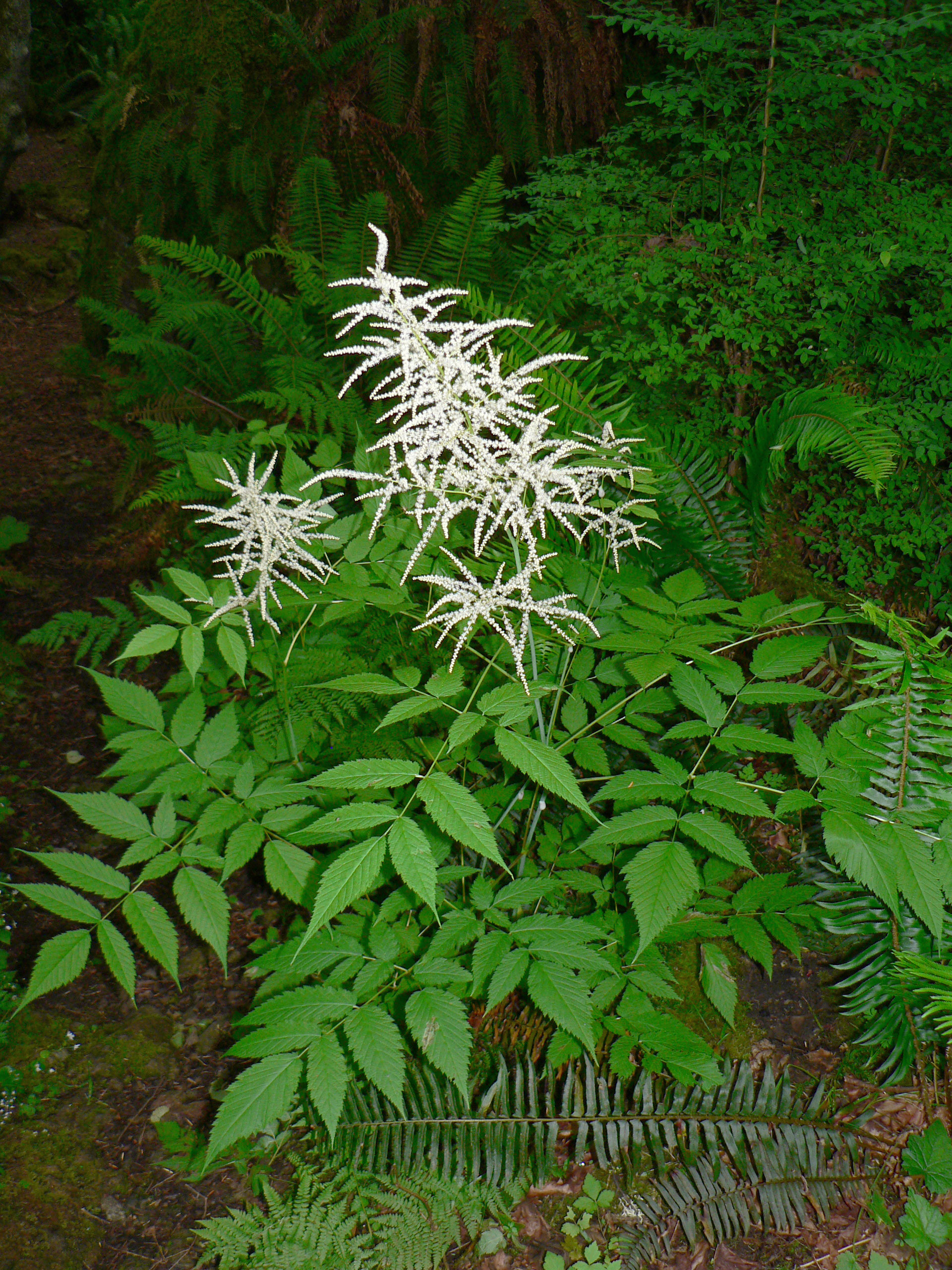
Goat's beard (Aruncus dioicus)

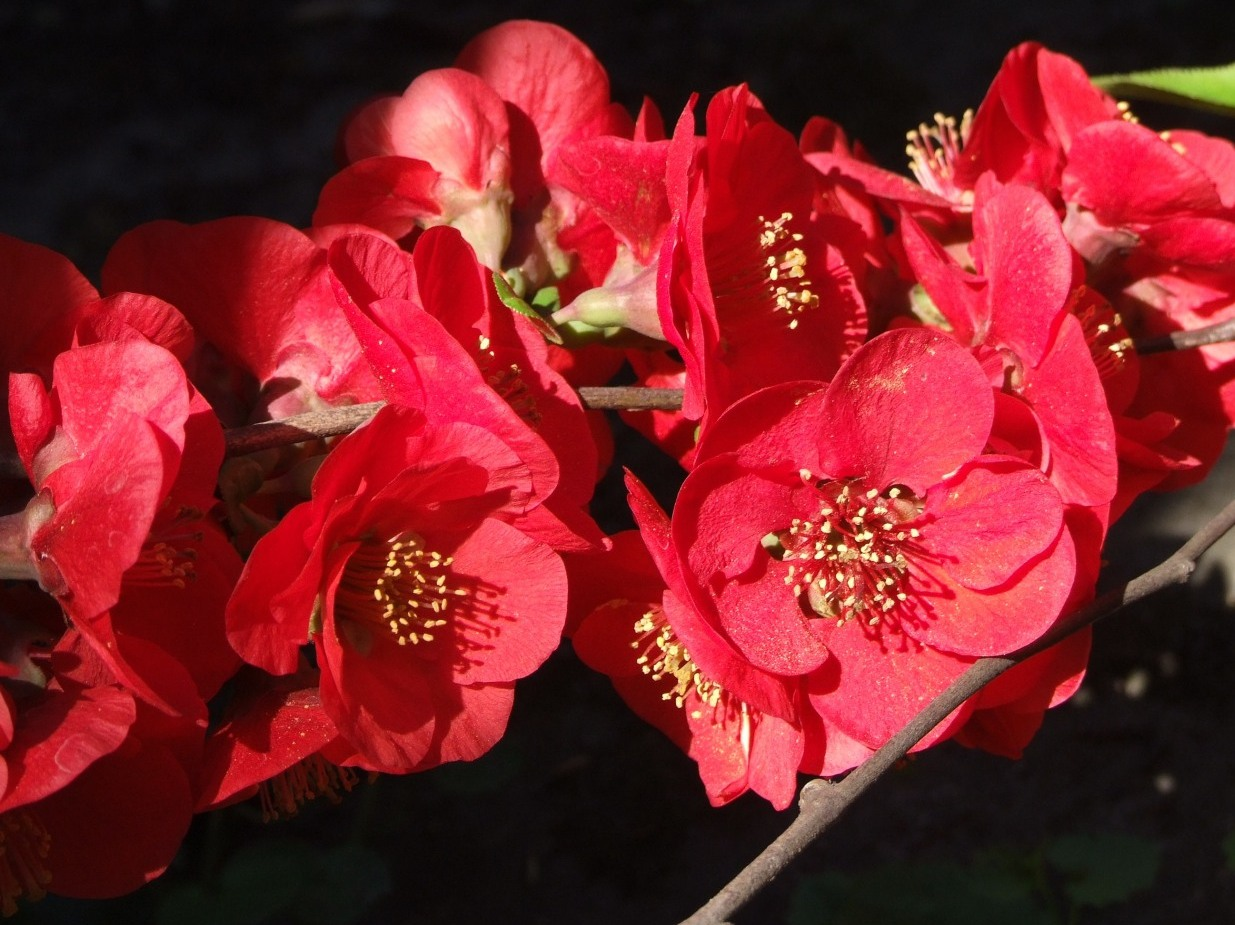
Maule's quince (Chaenomeles japonica)

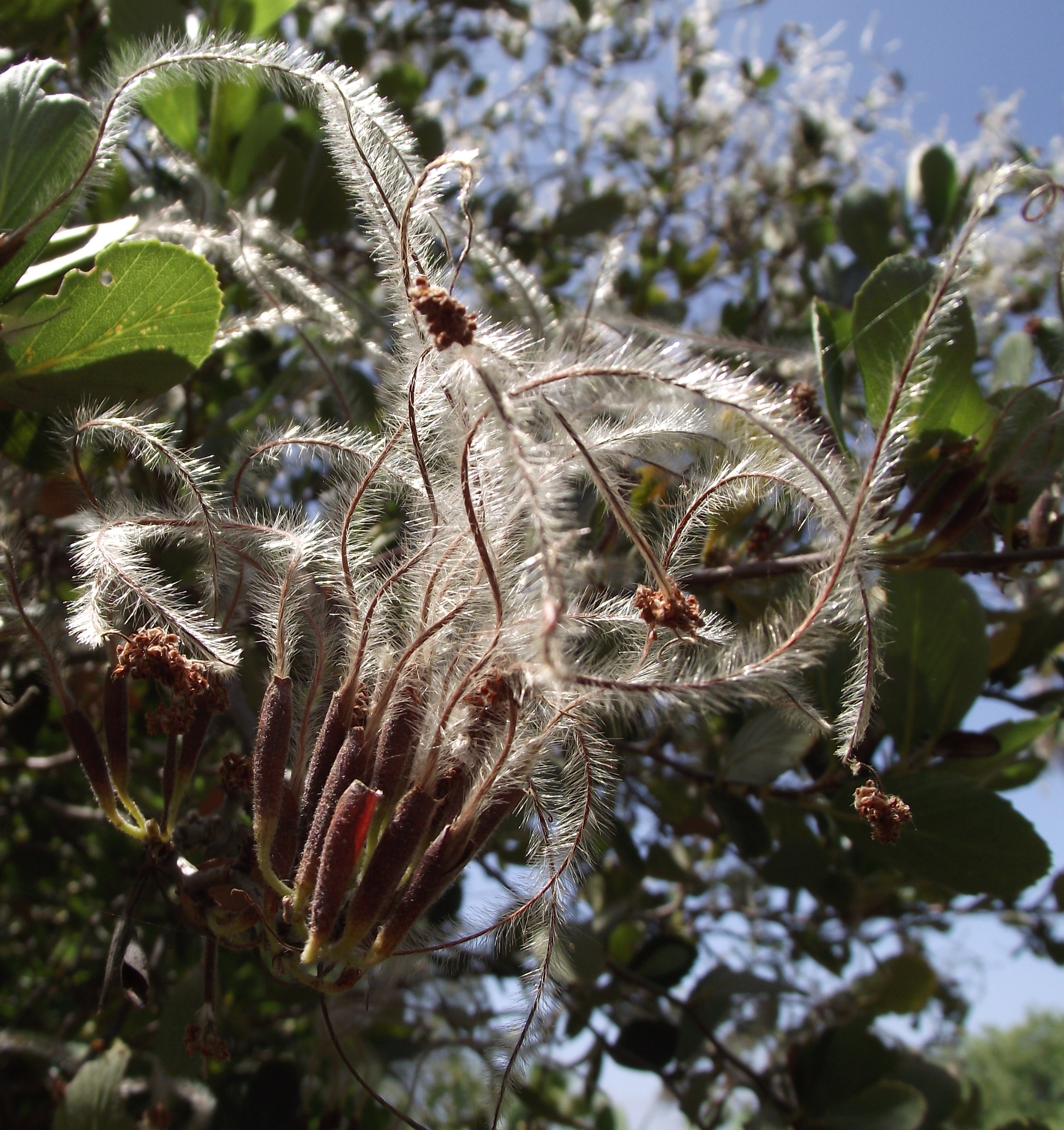
Mountain mahogany (Cercocarpus betuloides)

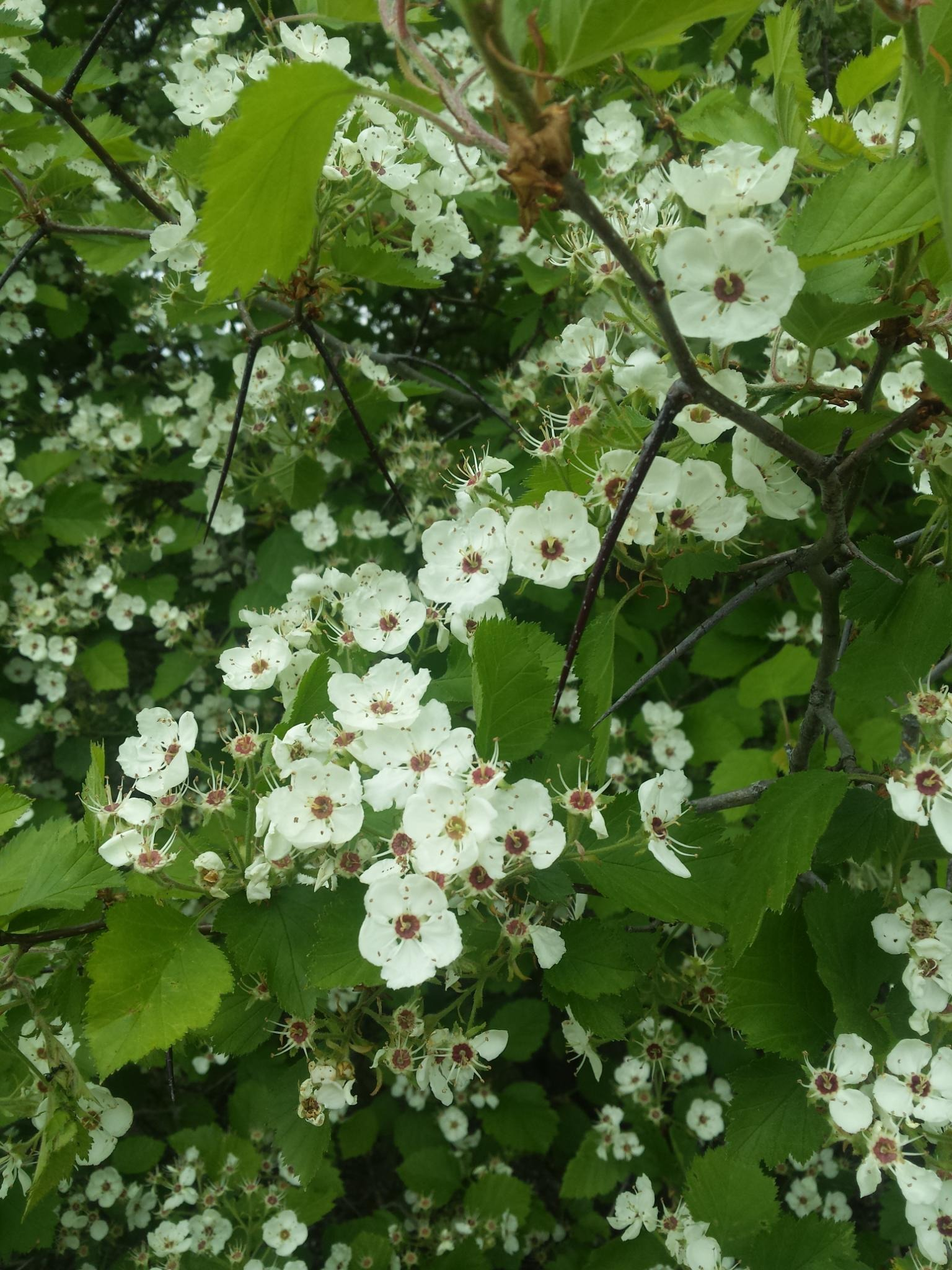
Northern downy hawthorn (Crataegus submollis)

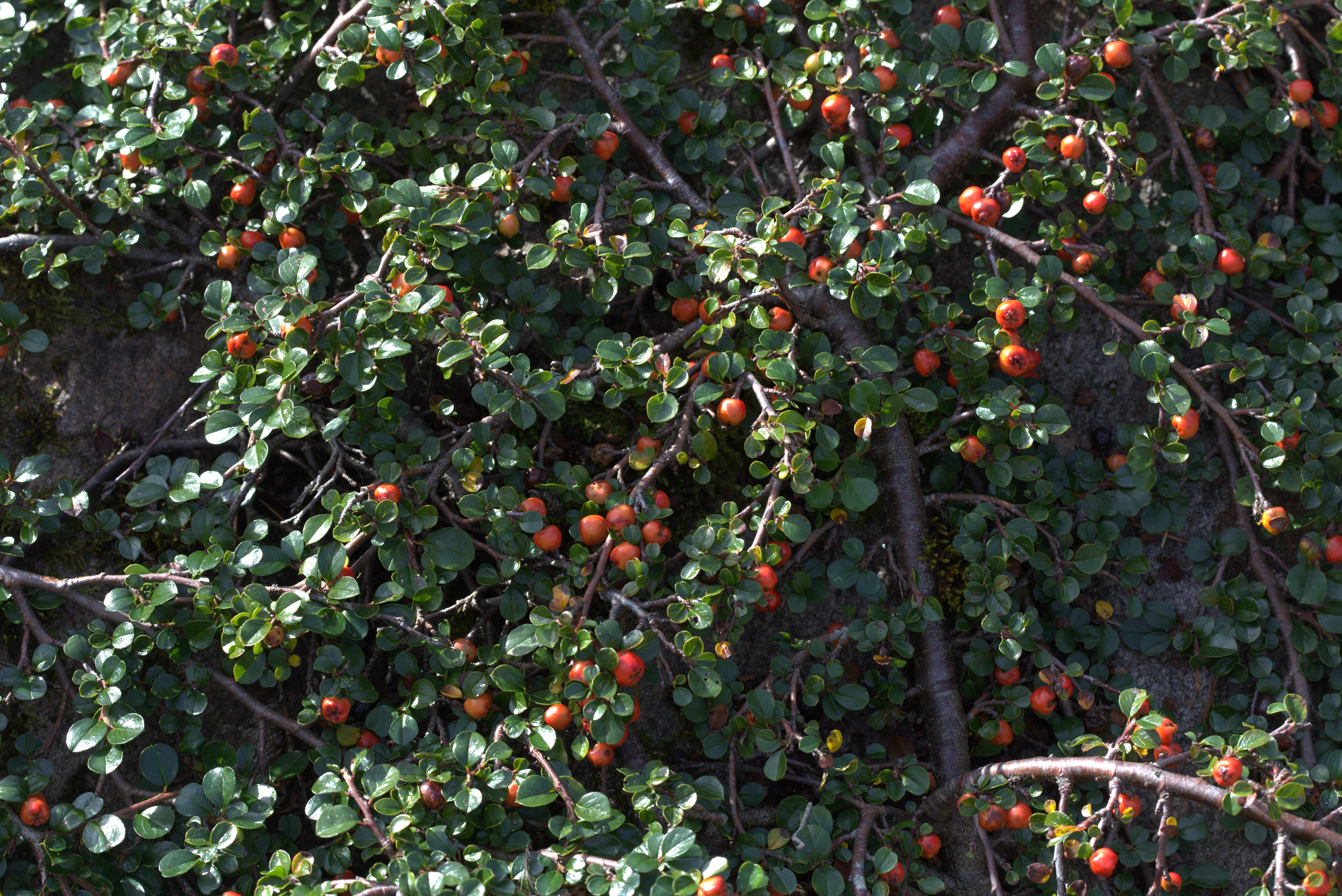
Creeping cotoneaster (Cotoneaster adpressus)

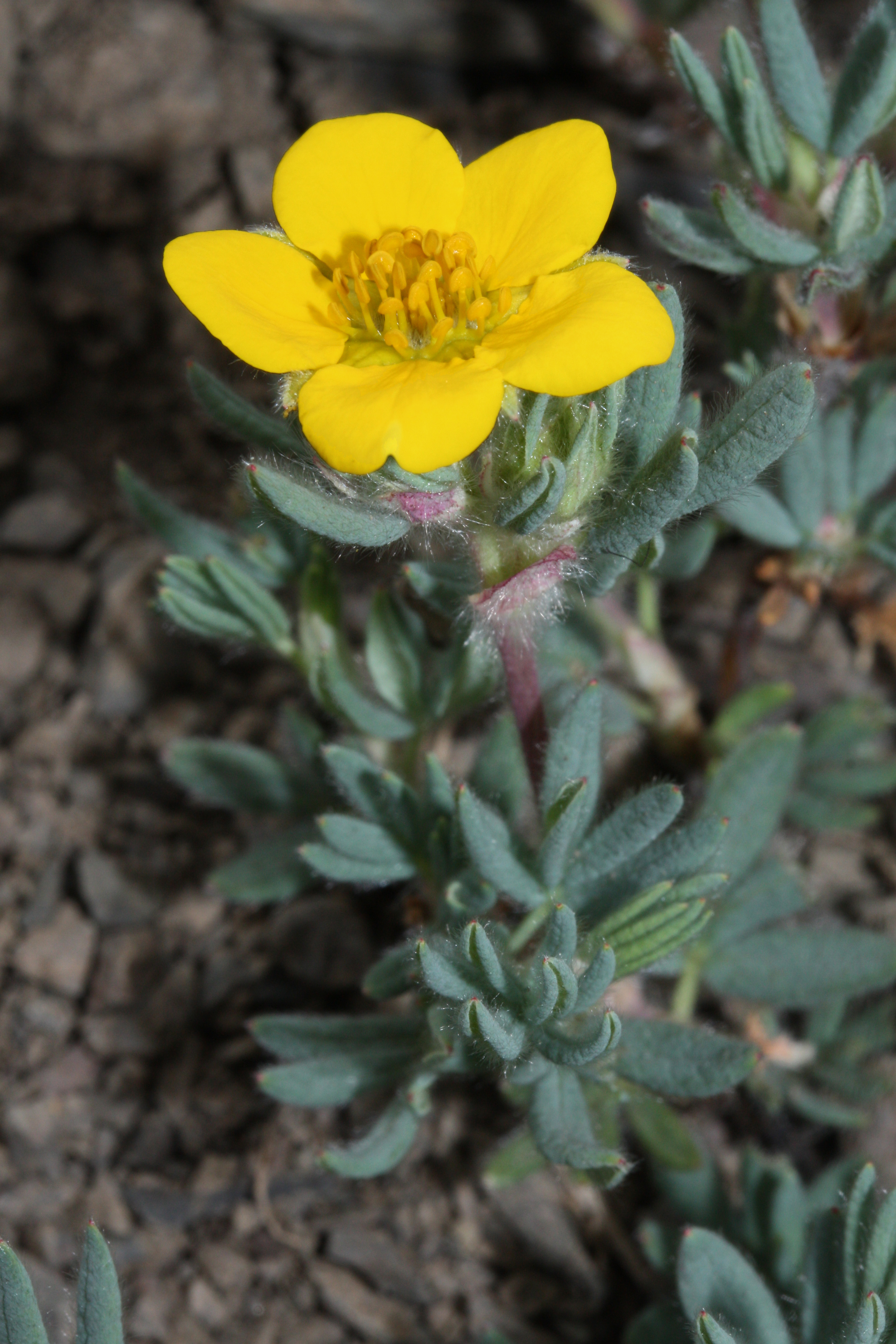
Shrubby cinquefoil (Dasiphora fruticosa)

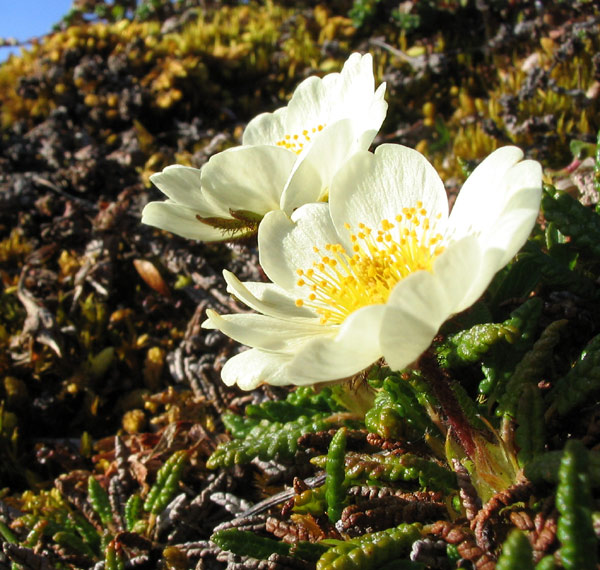
Mountain avens (Dryas octopetala)

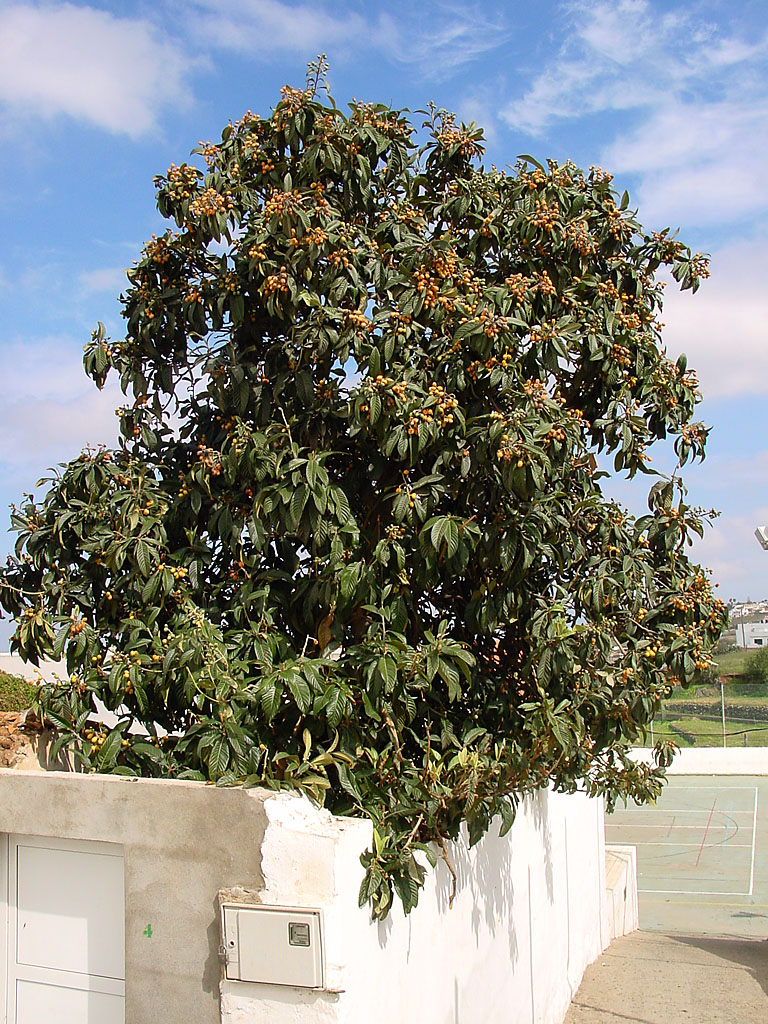
Loquat (Eriobotrya japonica), a fruit tree typical by flowering in autumn

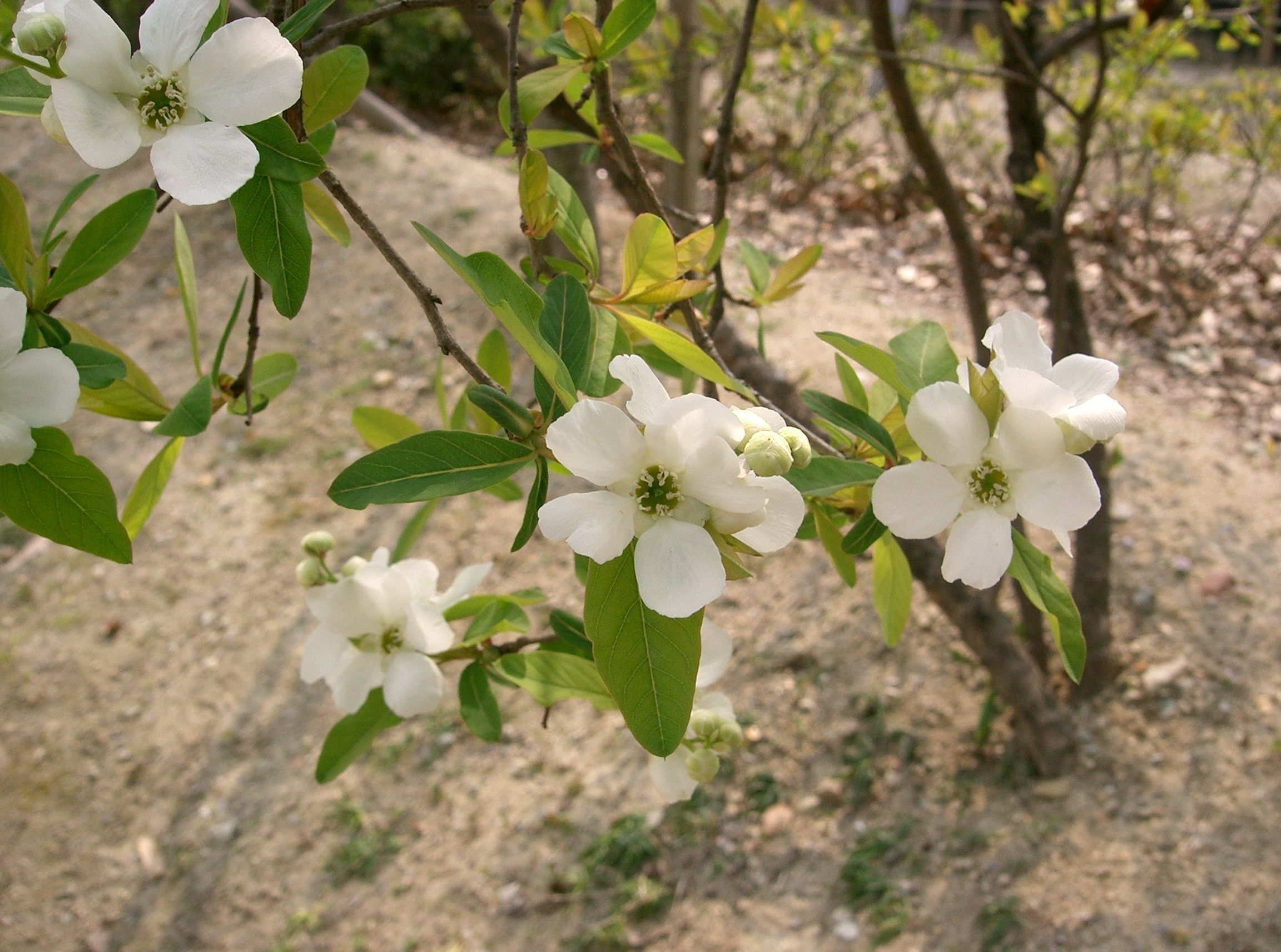
Pearlbush (Exochorda racemosa)

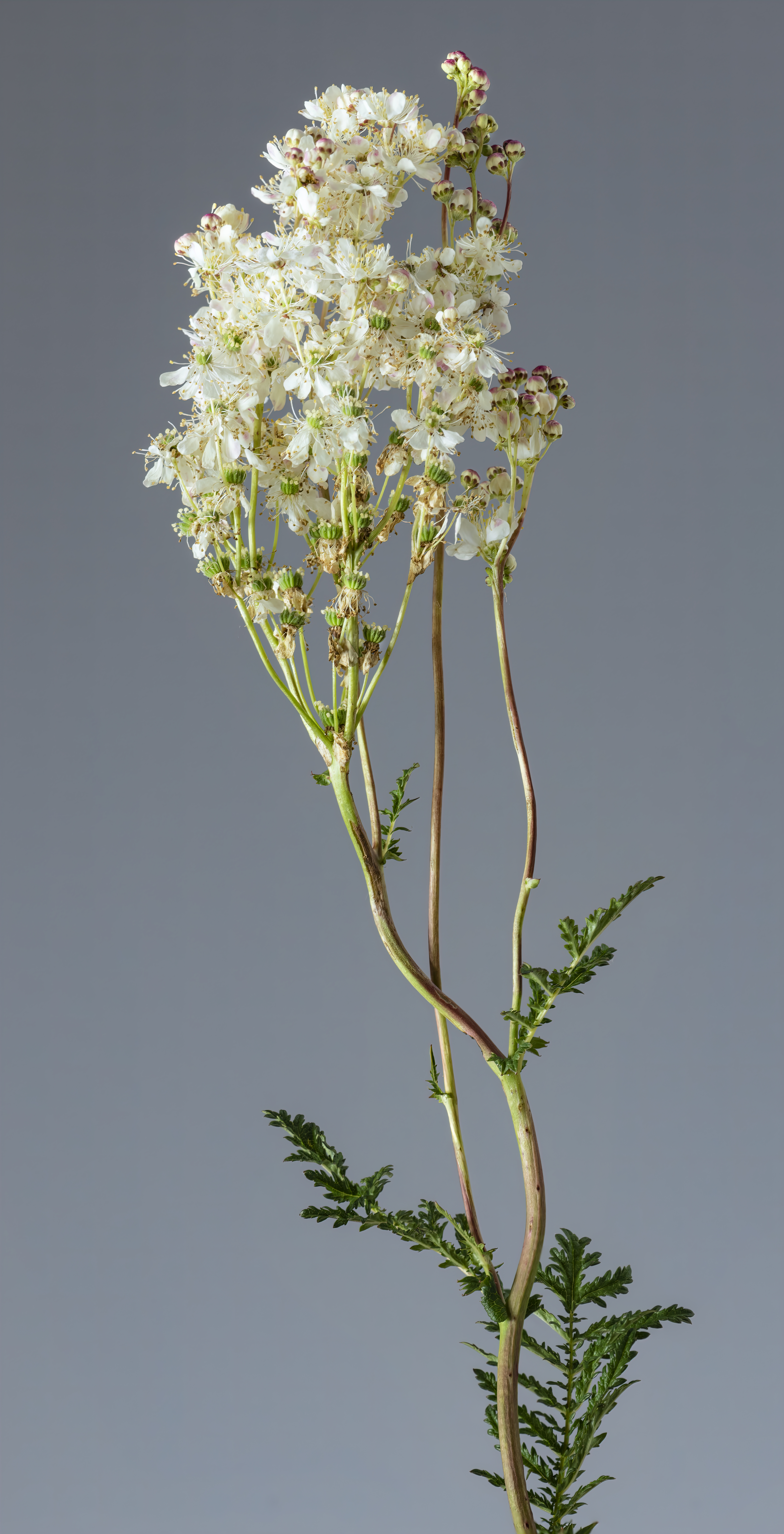
Dropwort (Filipendula vulgaris)

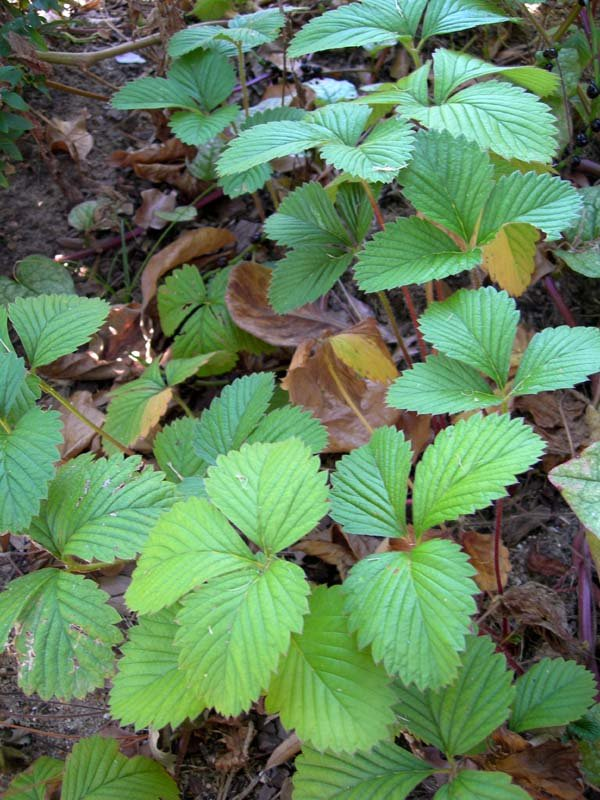
Musk strawberry (Fragaria moschata) valued for its intense aroma

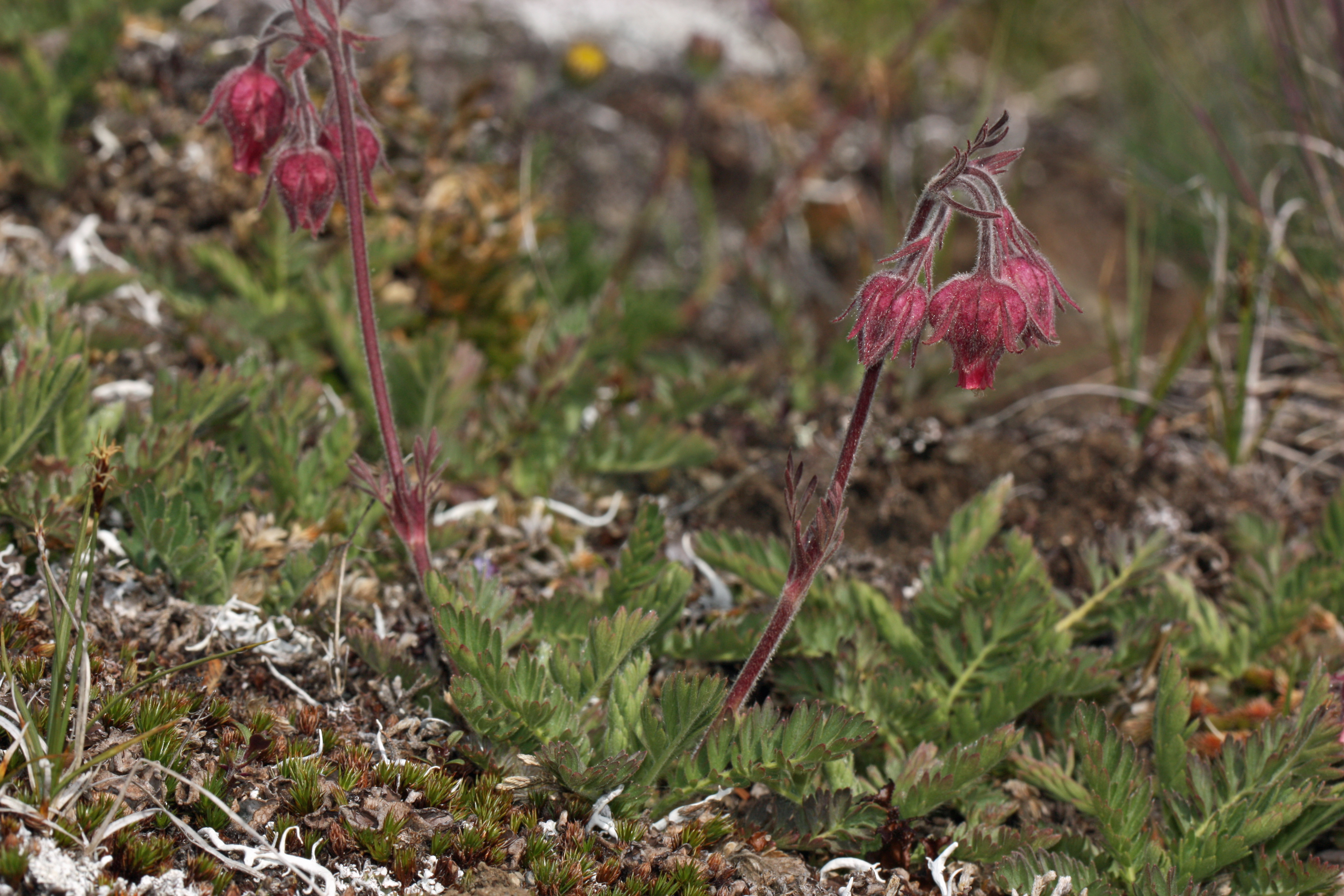
Old man's whiskers (Geum triflorum)

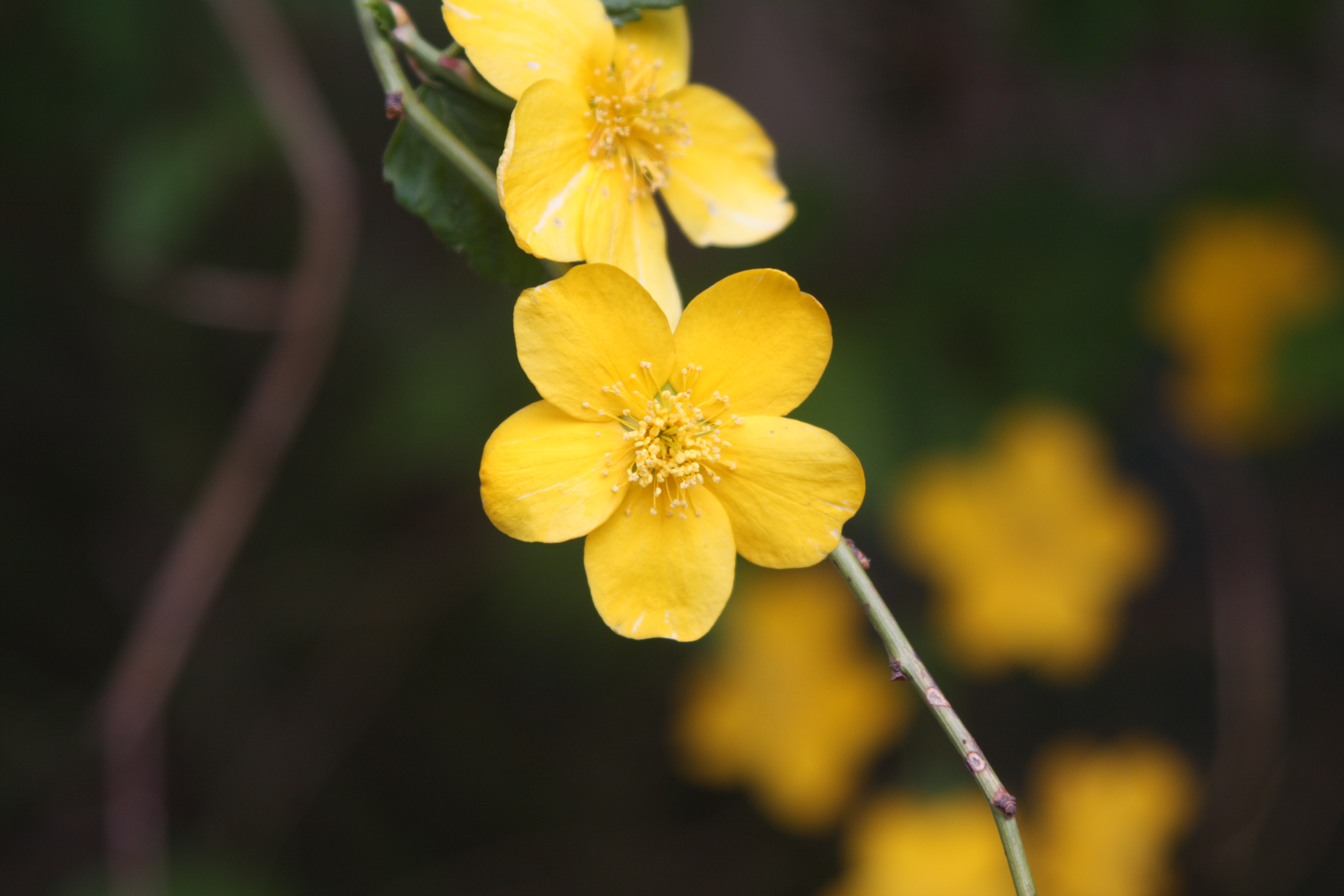
Japanese kerria (Kerria japonica)

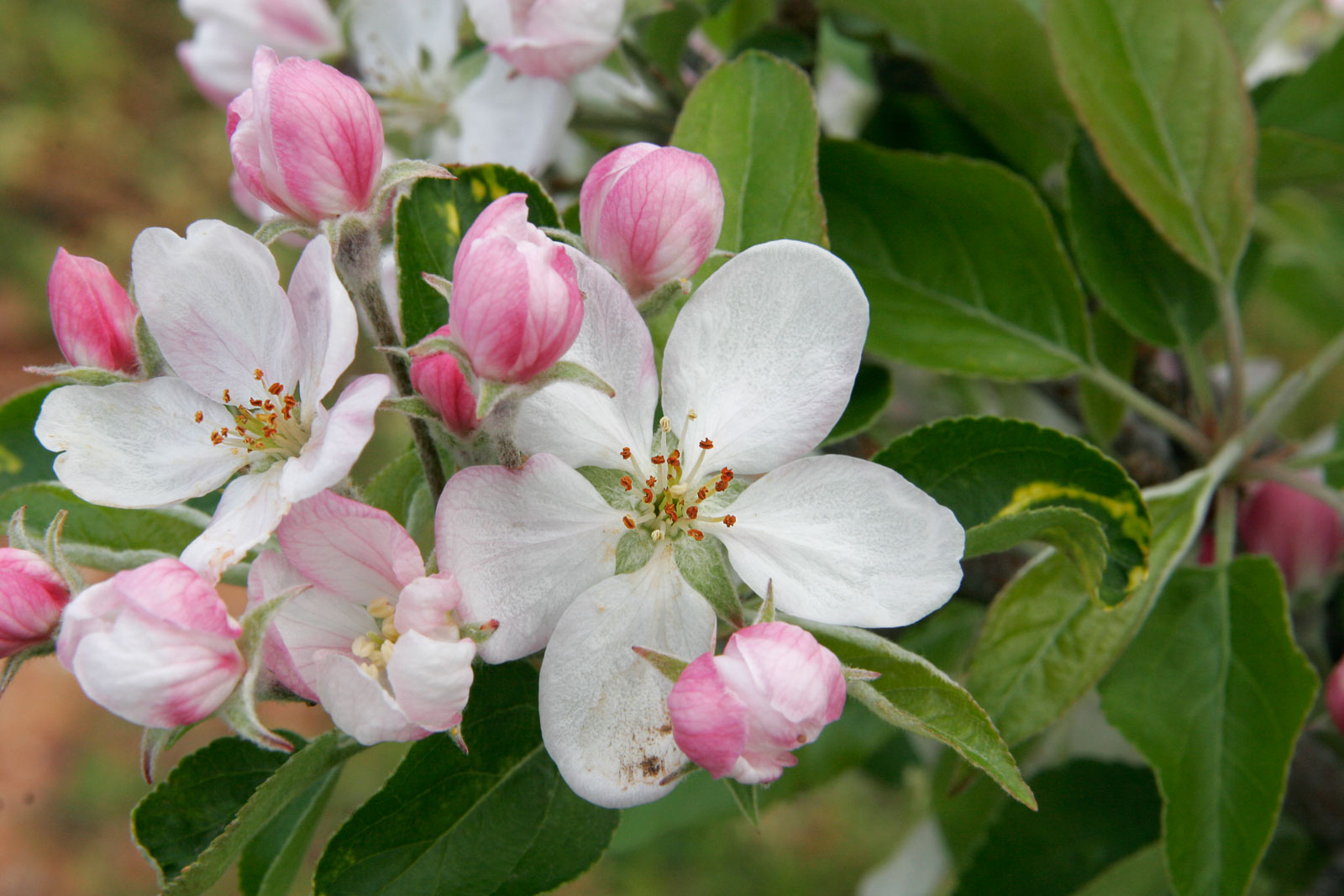
Apple tree blossoms (Malus domestica)

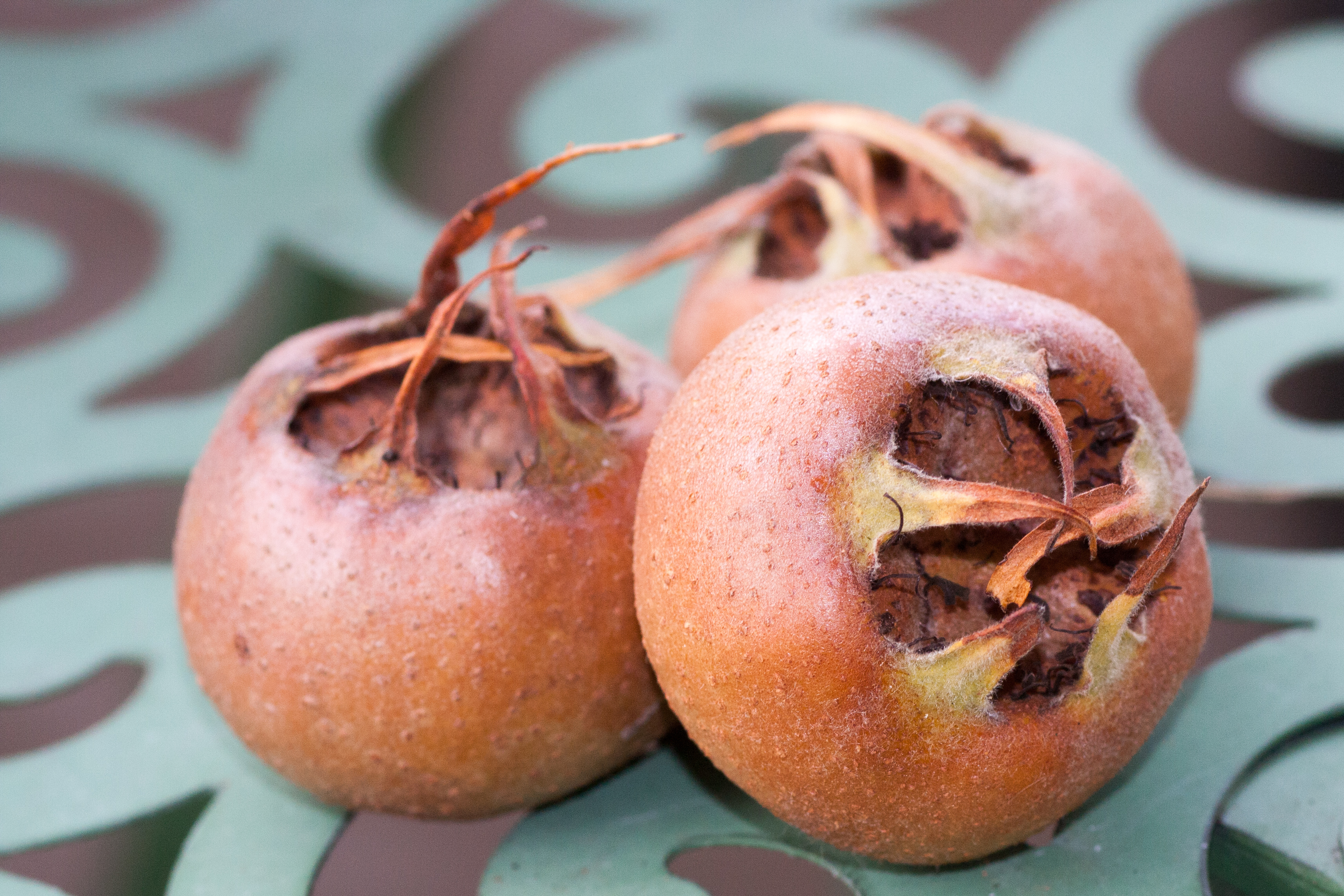
Common medlar (Mespilus germanica)

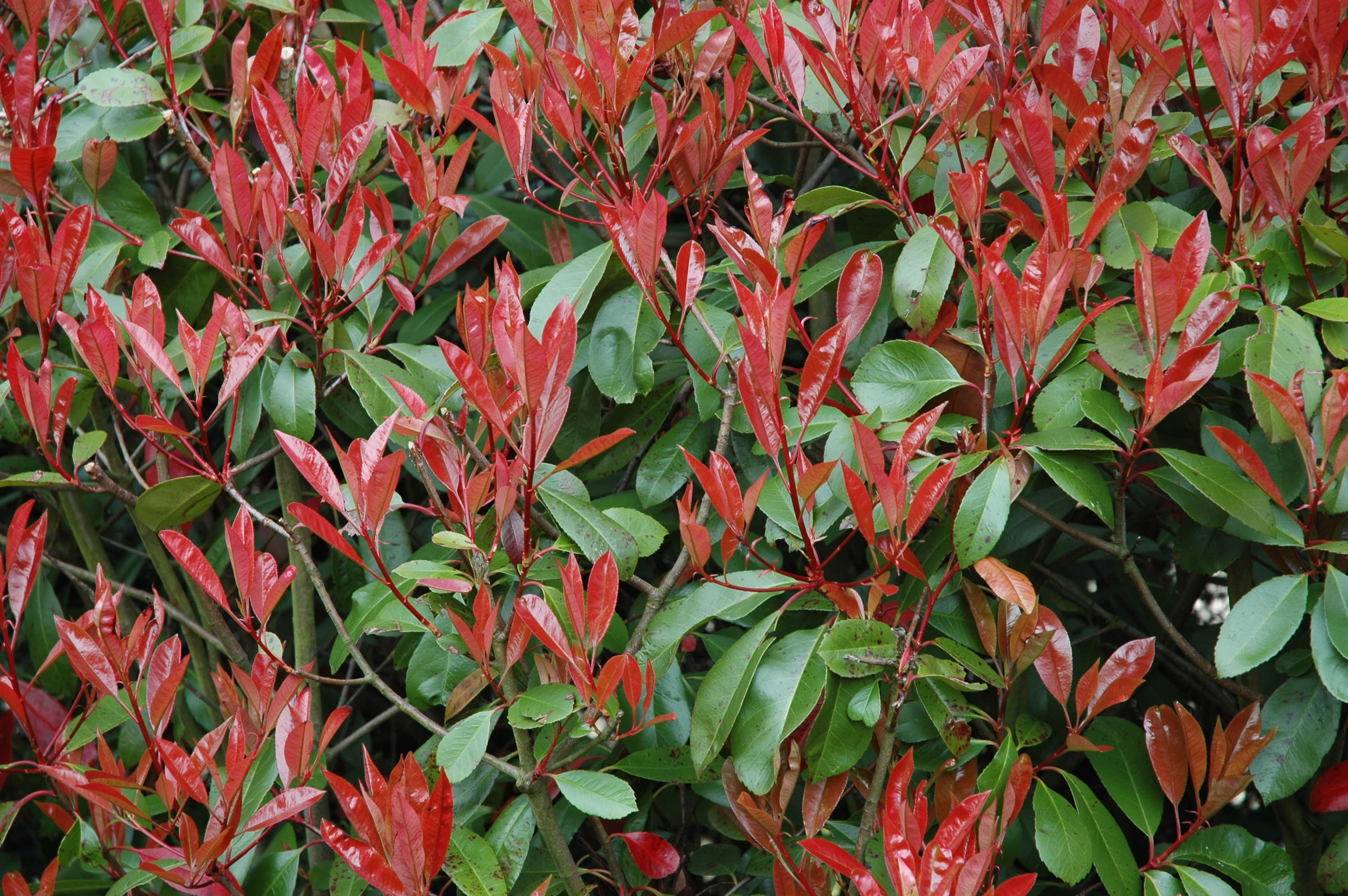
Red Tip Photinia (Photinia x fraseri) popular for red color of its new growths

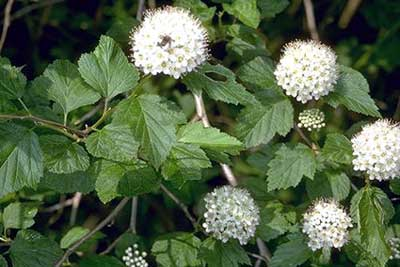
Common ninebark (Physocarpus opulifolius)

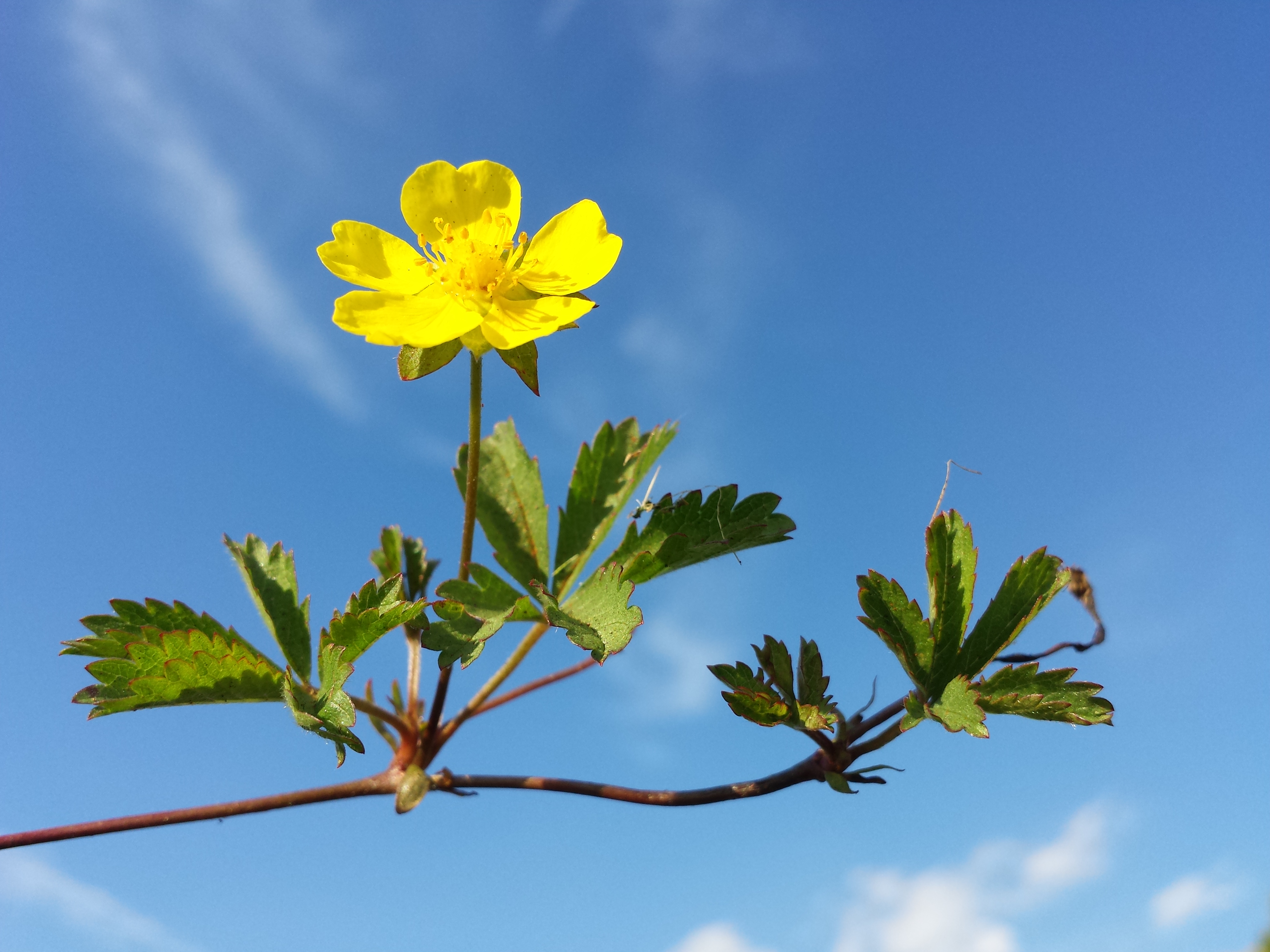
Creeping cinquefoil (Potentilla reptans)

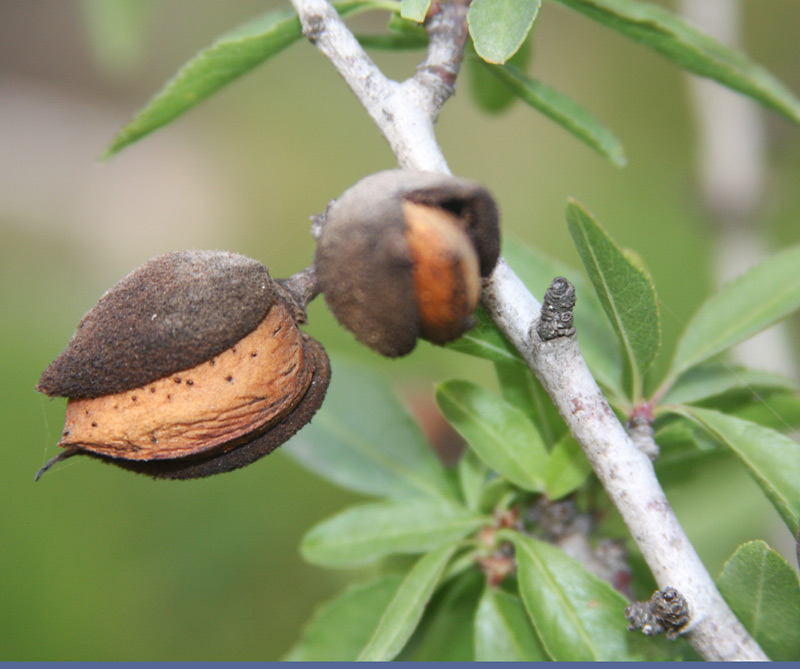
Mature fruit of an almond tree (Prunus dulcis)

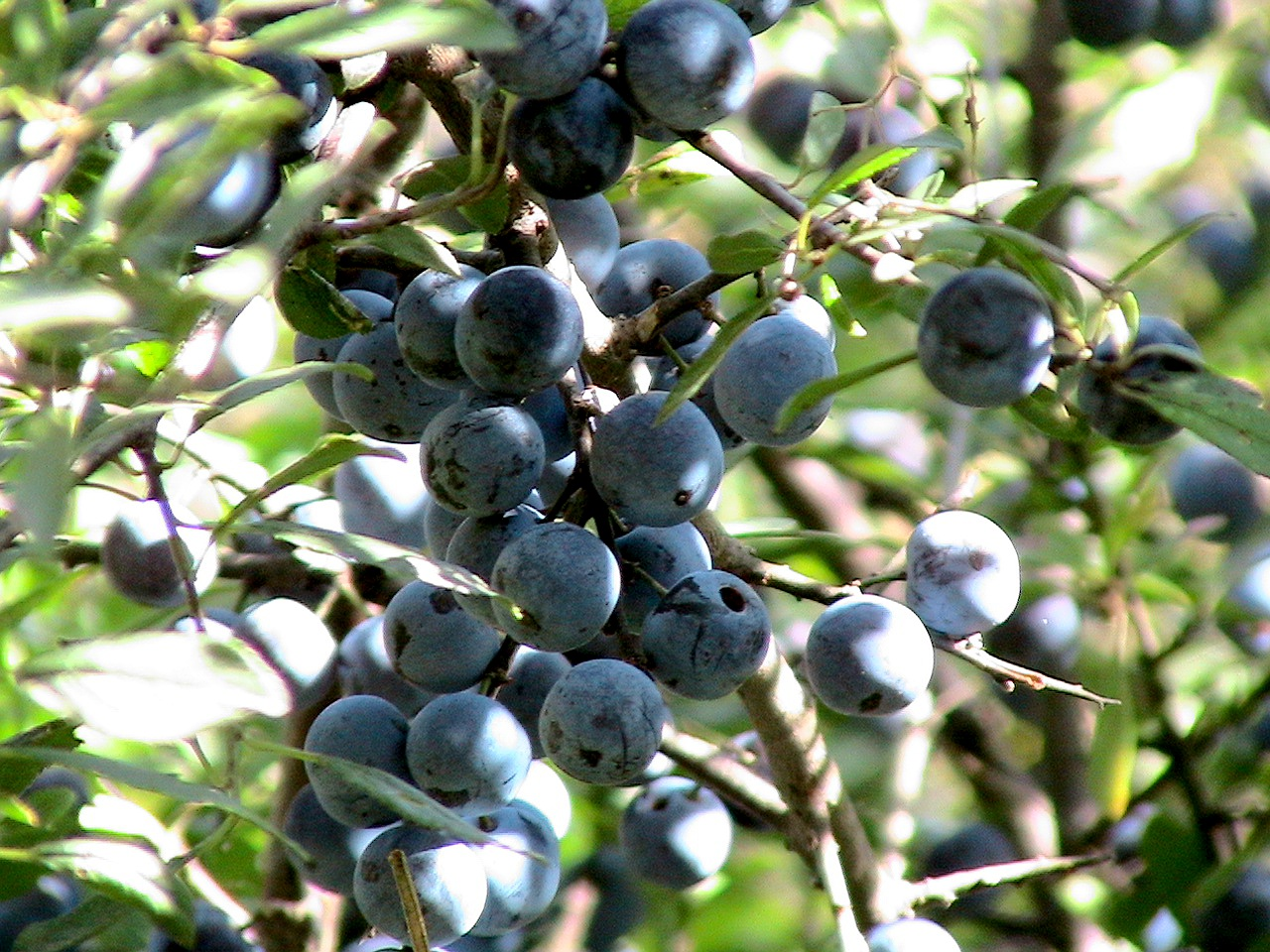
Blackthorn (Prunus spinosa)

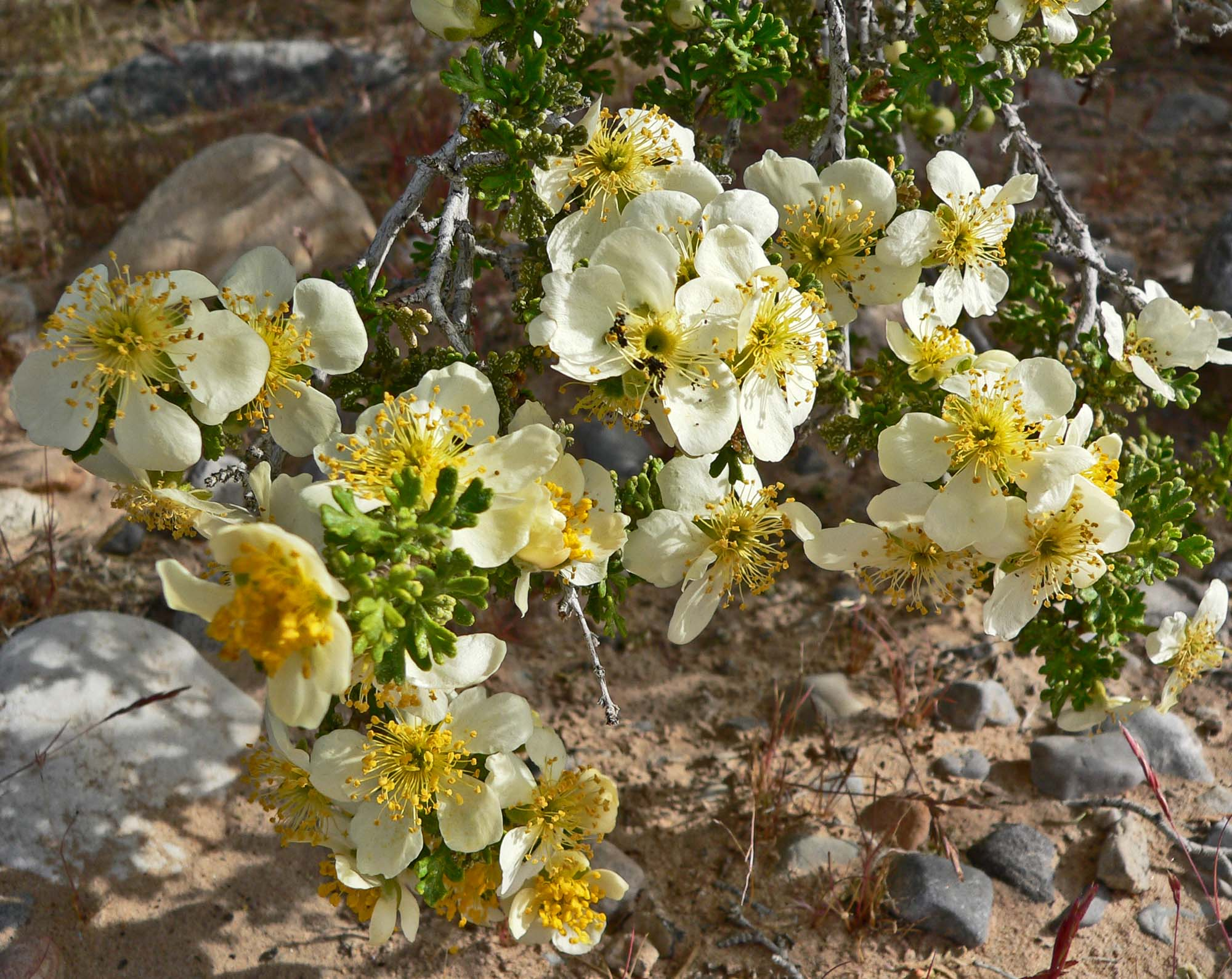
Stansbury's cliffrose (Purshia stansburyana)

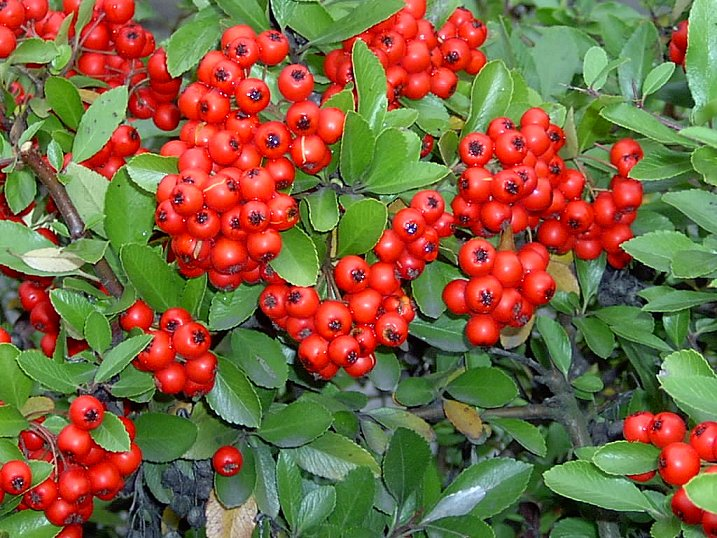
Scarlet firethorn (Pyracantha coccinea)

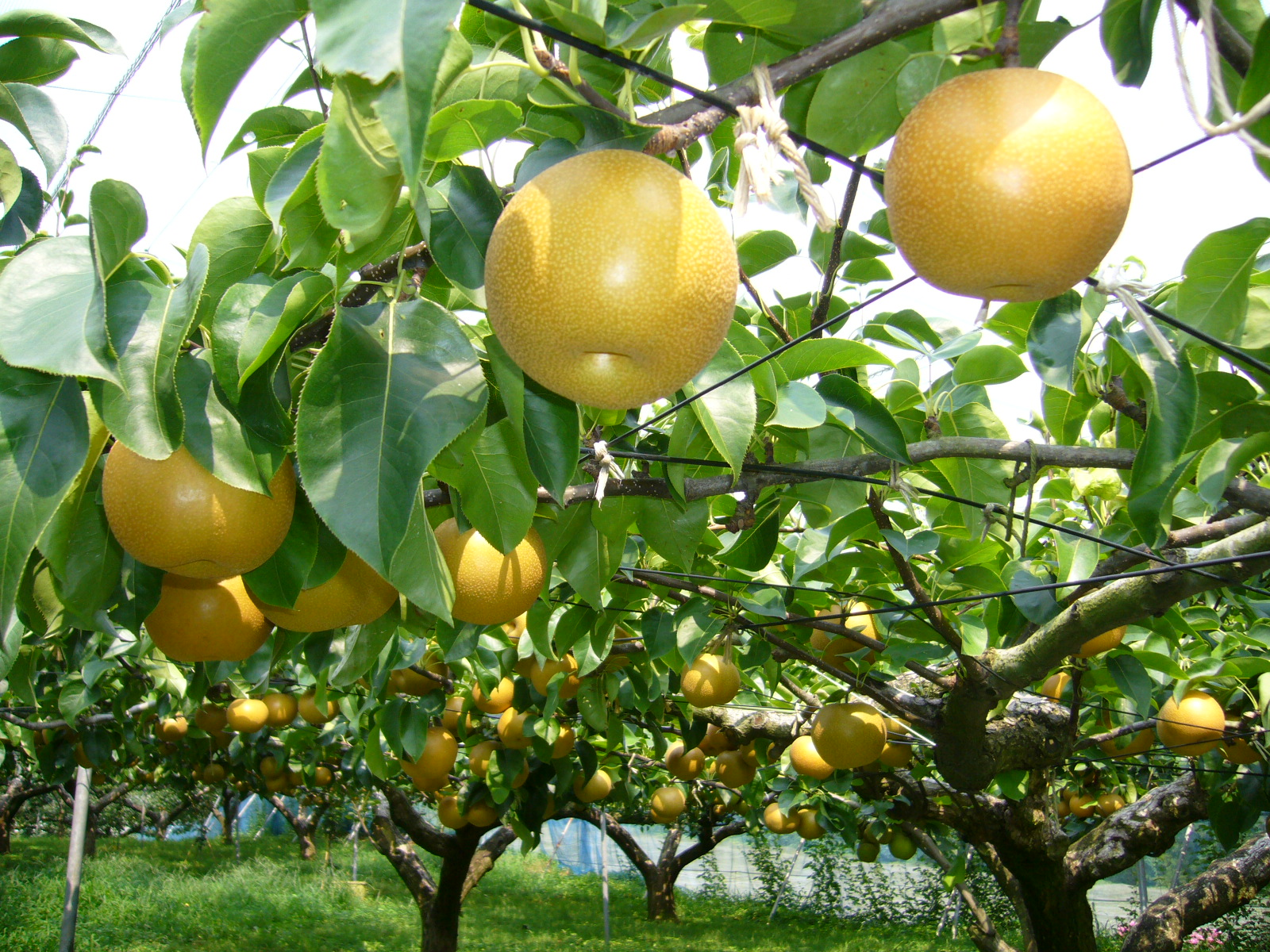
Nashi pear (Pyrus pyrifolia) typical for Asian countries

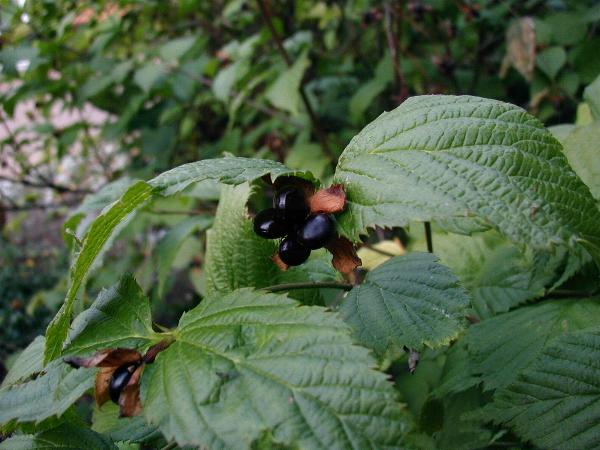
Rhodotypos scandens, a Japanese shrub with fruits high in toxic amygdalin

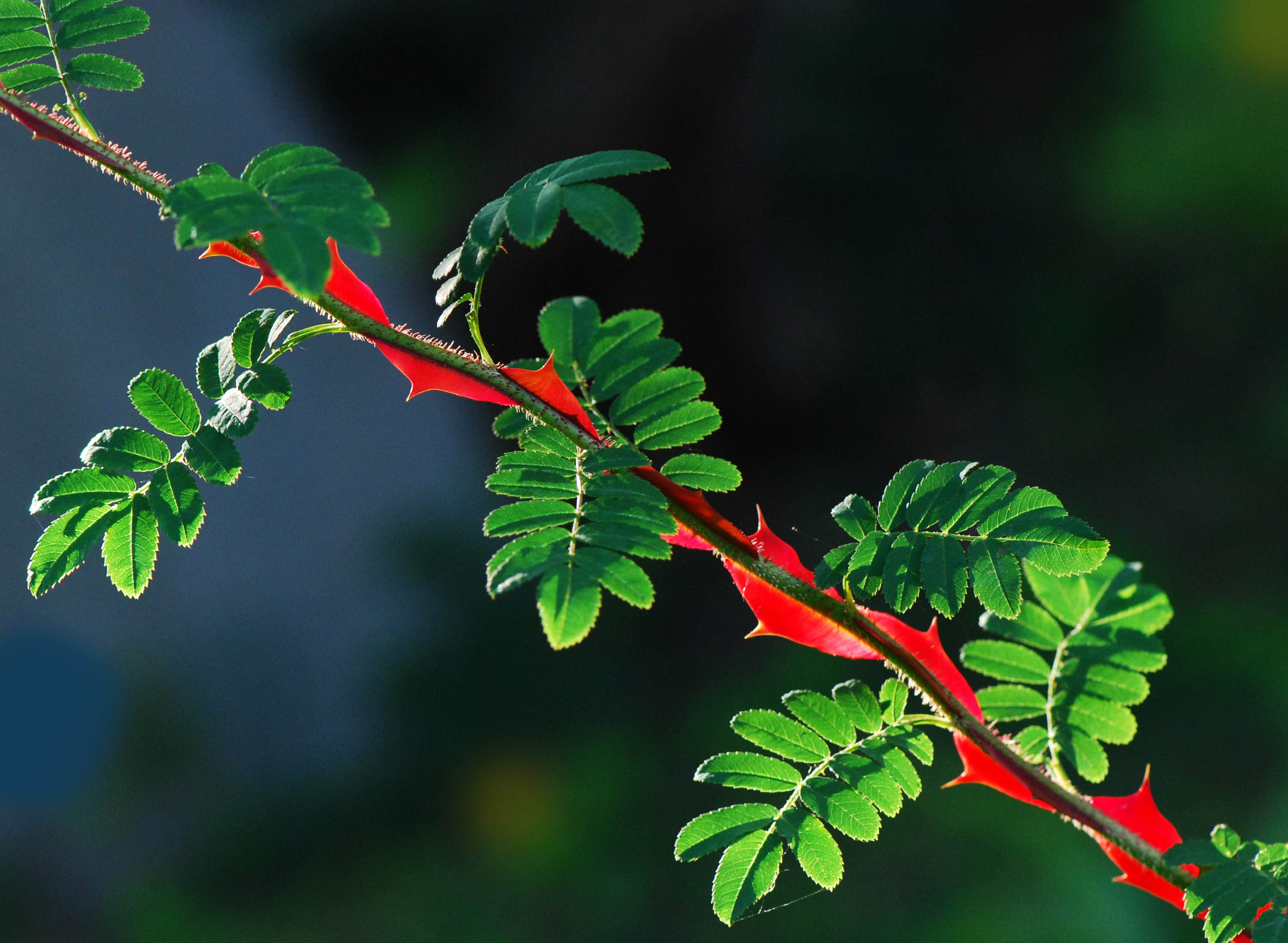
The silky rose (Rosa sericea) known for its ornamental prickles

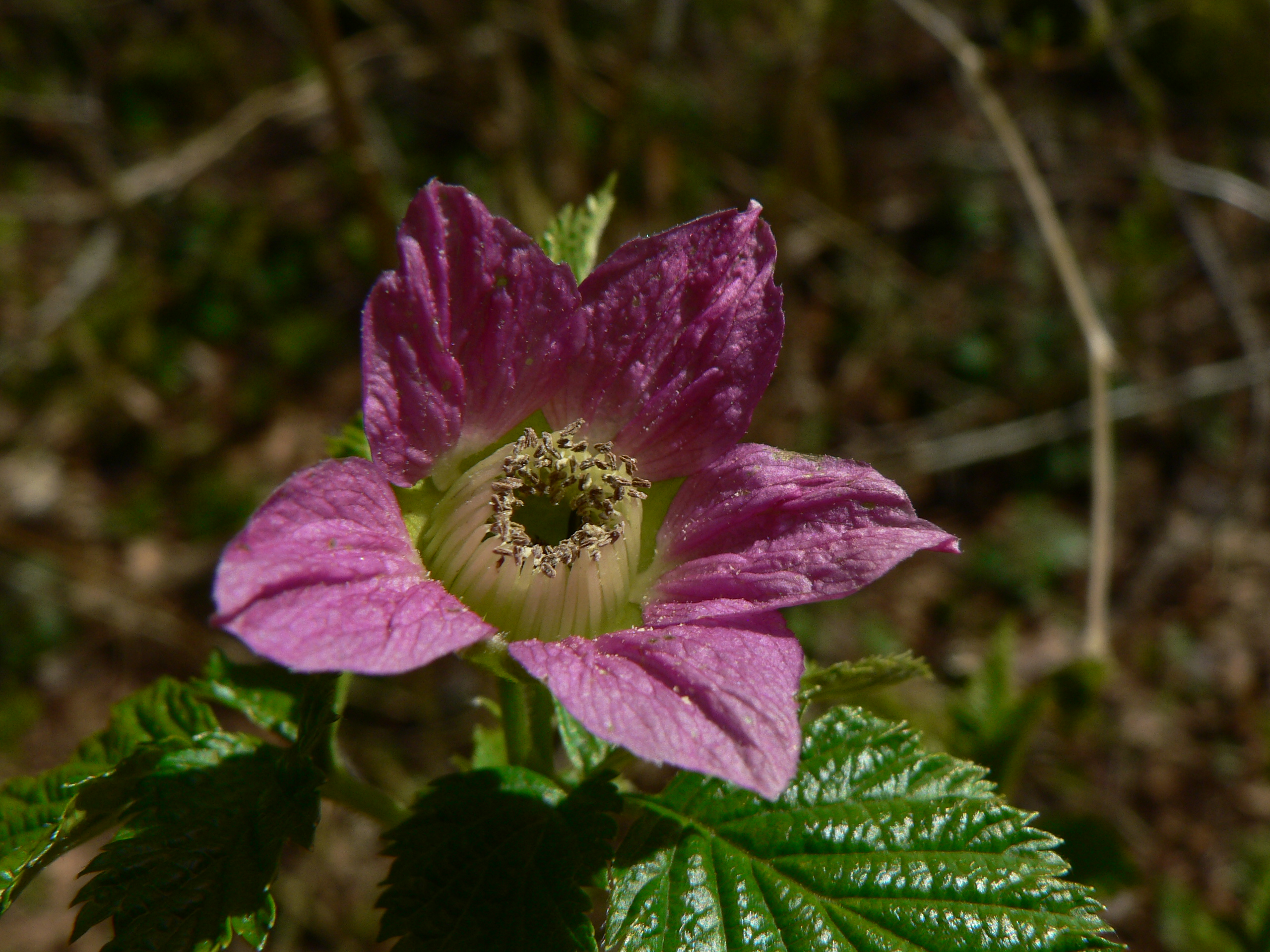
Salmonberry (Rubus spectabilis)

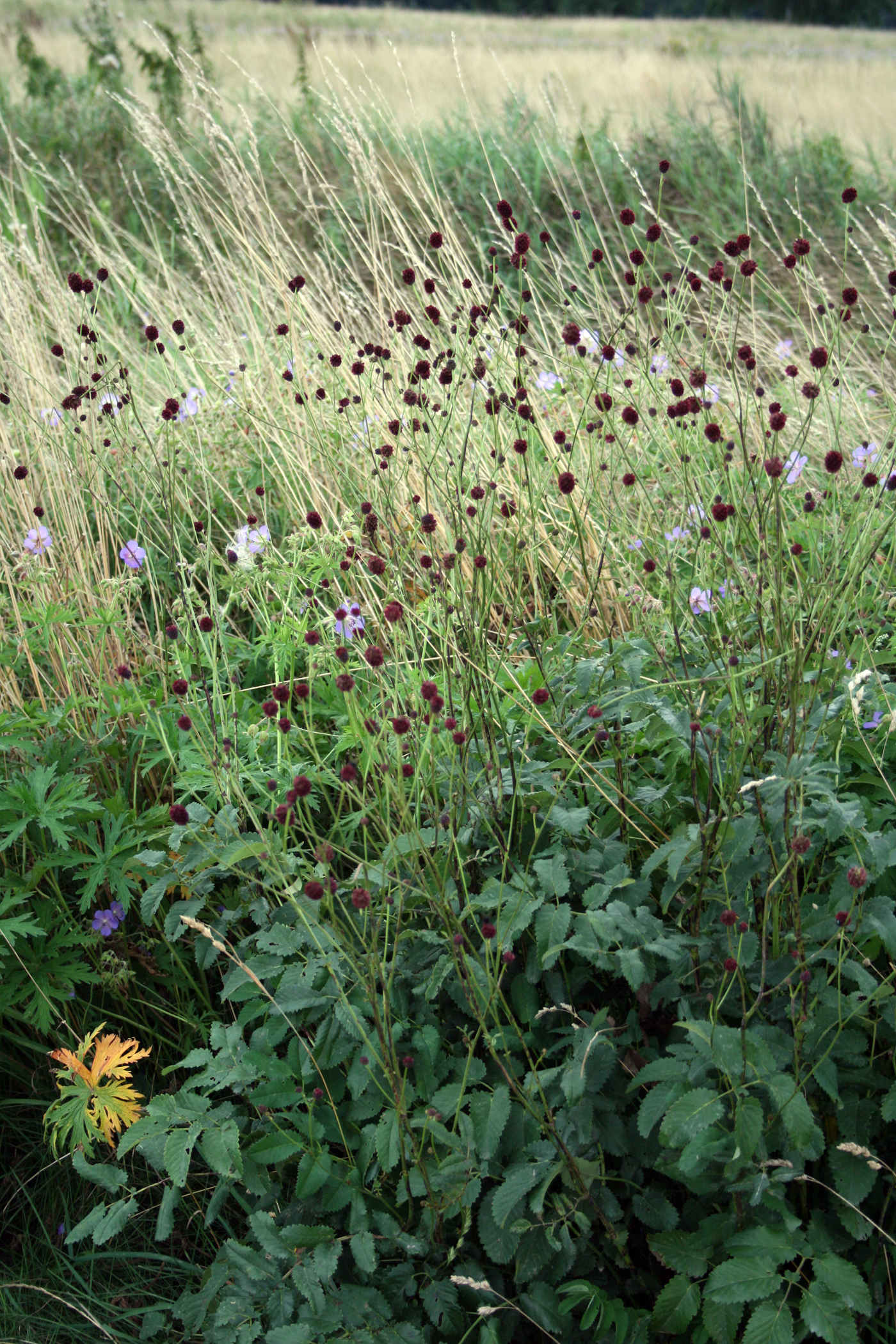
Great burnet (Sanguisorba officinalis)

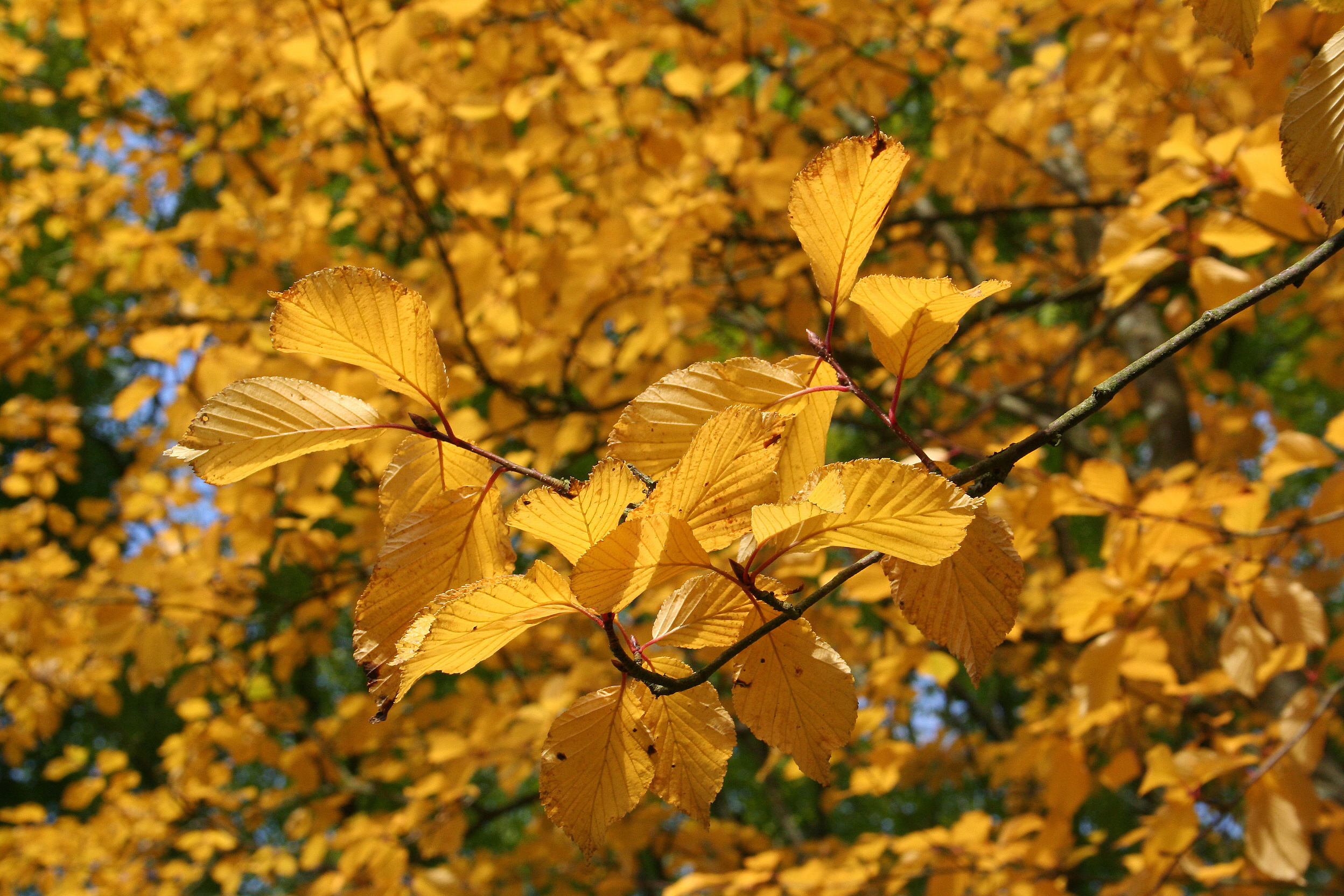
Autumn foliage of the Korean mountain ash (Alniaria alnifolia)

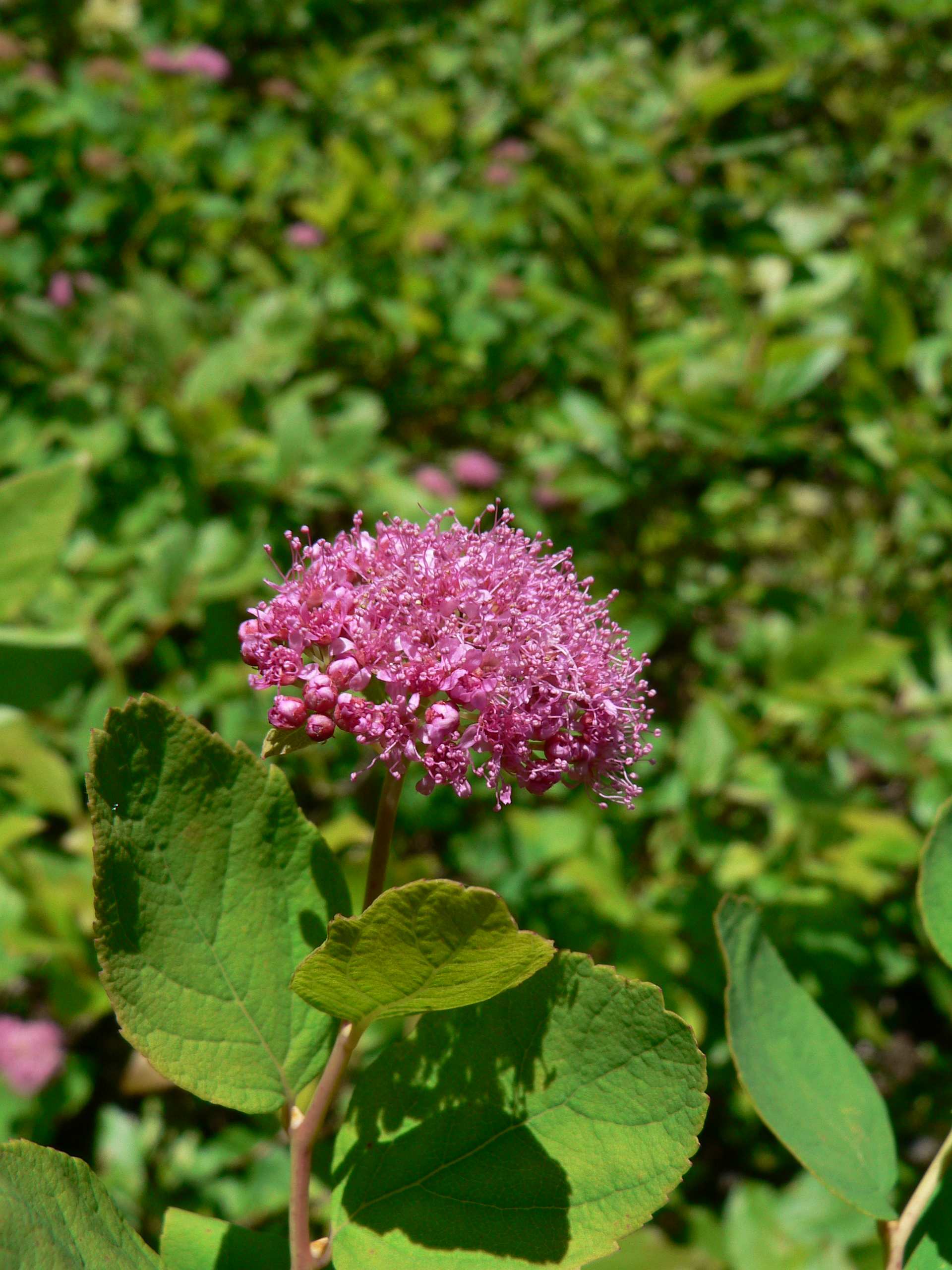
Rose meadowsweet (Spiraea splendens)

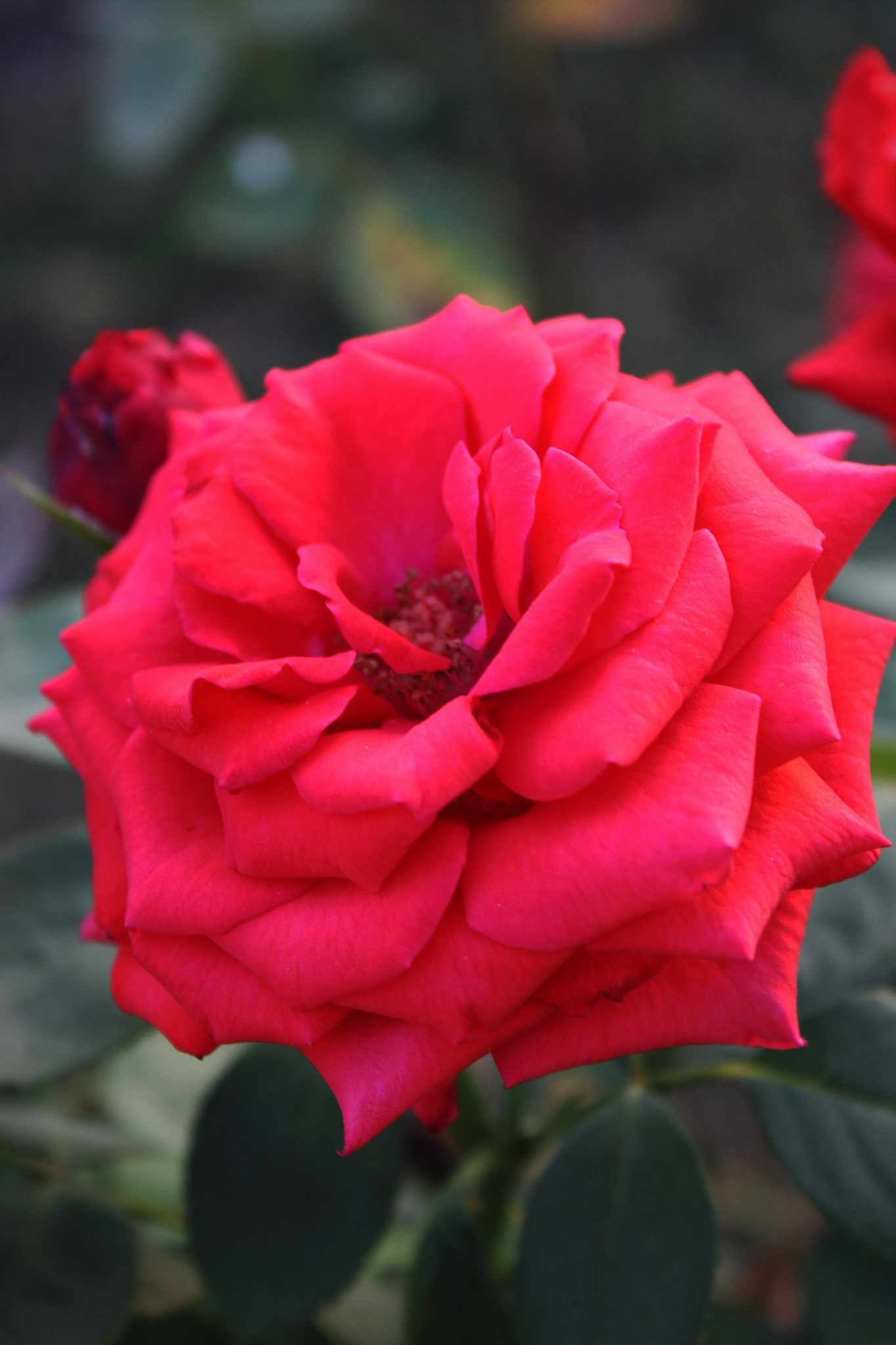
Rosa chinensis (Rosa chinensis)
