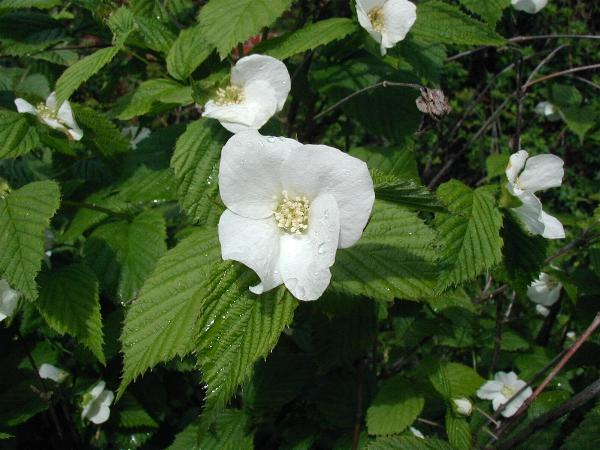

Scientific classification
- Kingdom: Plantae
- Clade: Tracheophytes
- Clade: Angiosperms
- Clade: Eudicots
- Clade: Rosids
- Order: Rosales
- Family: Rosaceae
- Subfamily: Amygdaloideae
- Tribe: Kerrieae
- Genus: Rhodotypos; Siebold & Zucc.
- Species: R. scandens

Binomial name
- Rhodotypos scandens (Thunb.) Makino

= Rhodotypos =

Family of shrubs

Rhodotypos scandens, the sole species of the genus Rhodotypos, is a deciduous shrub in the family Rosaceae, closely related to Kerria and included in that genus by some botanists. It is native to China, Korea, possibly also Japan.

== Description ==
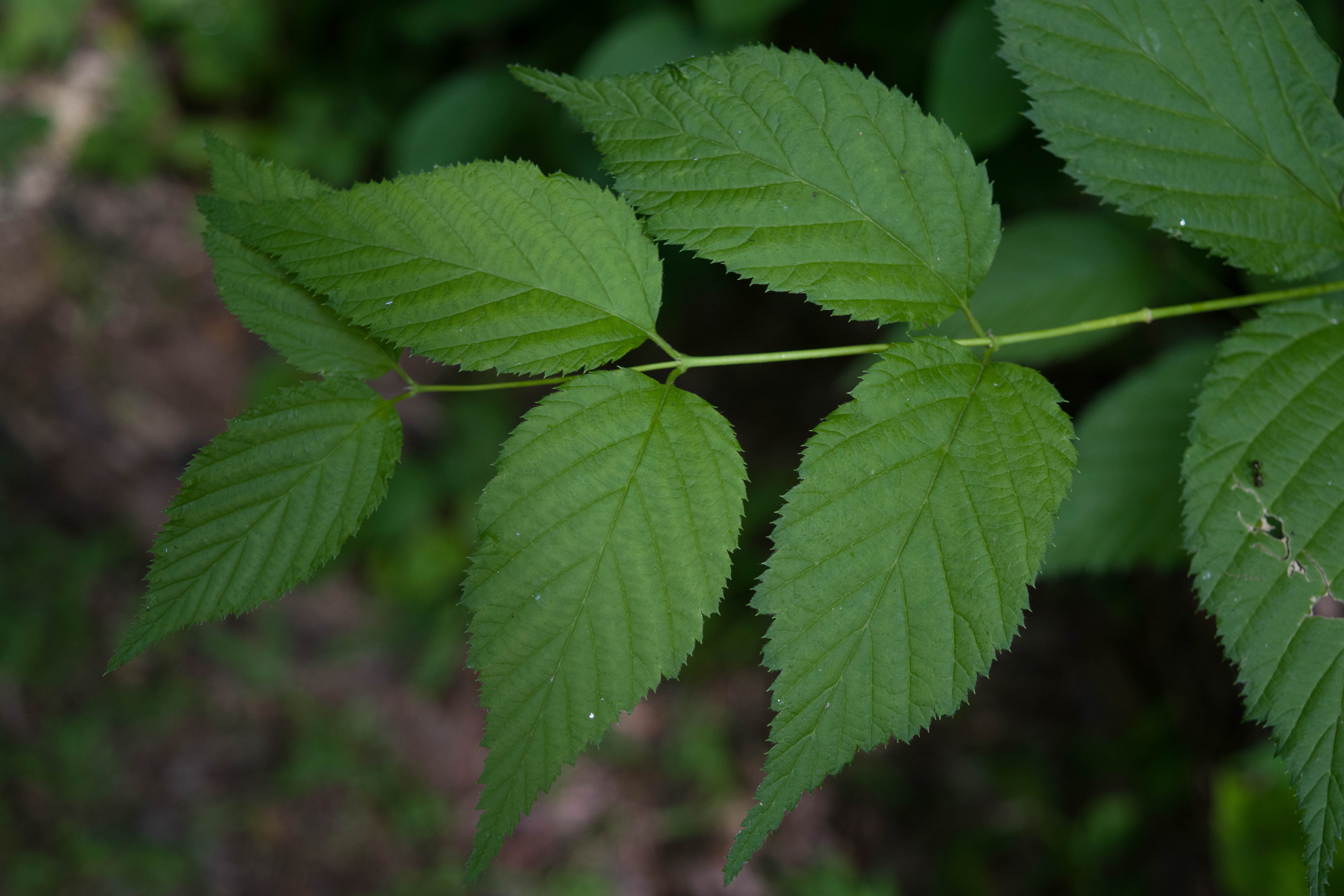
Leaves

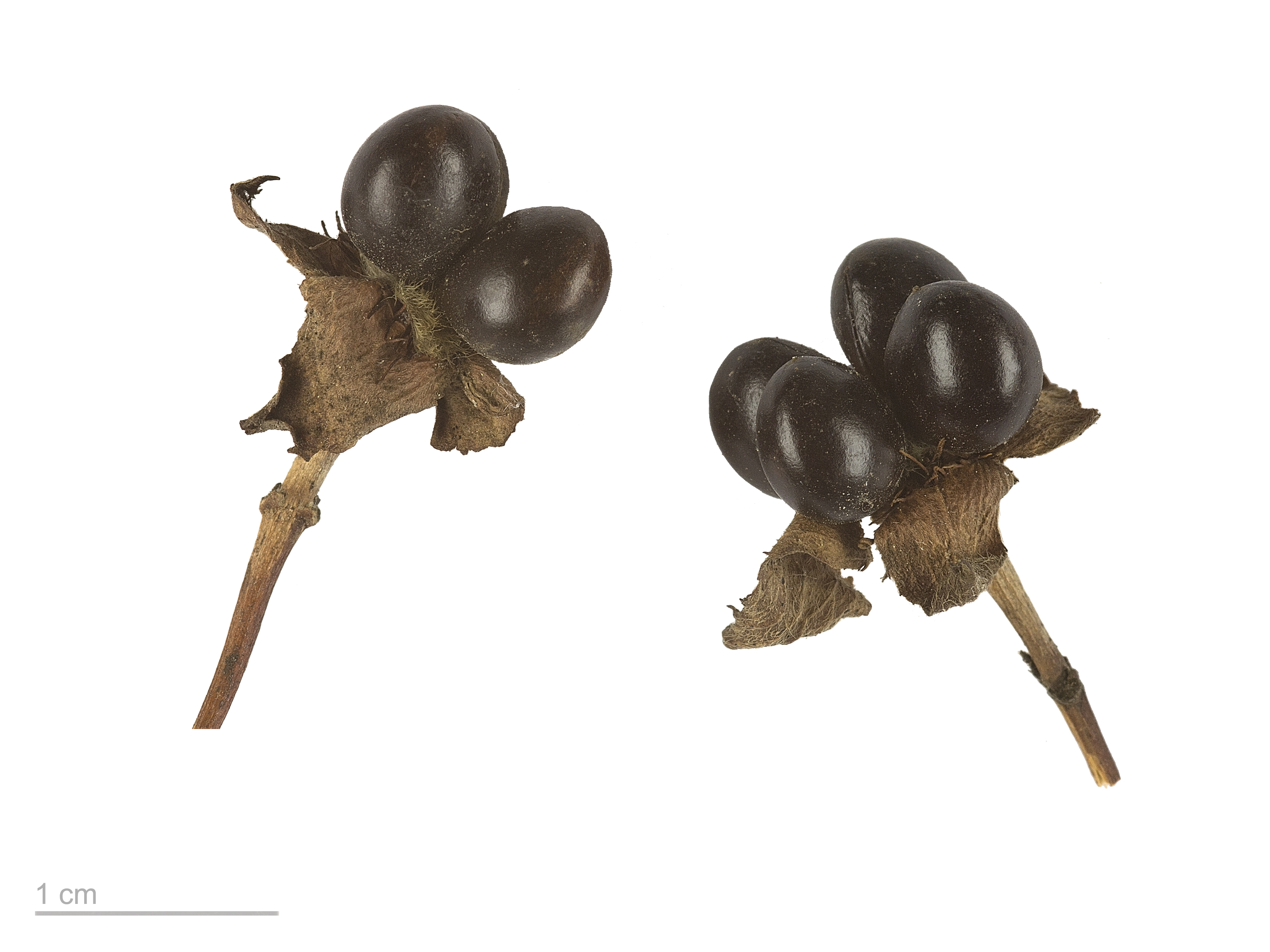
Rhodotypos scandens - MHNT

It grows to 2–5 m tall, with (unusually for a species in the Rosaceae) opposite (not alternate) leaves, simple ovate-acute, 3–6 cm long and 2–4 cm broad with a serrated margin. The flowers are white, 3–4 cm diameter, and (also unusually) have four (not five) petals; flowering is from late spring to mid-summer. The fruit is a cluster of 1-4 shiny black drupes 5–8 mm diameter.

It does not have a widely used English name, most commonly being known by its genus name rhodotypos, also occasionally as jetbead or jet-bead. It is an invasive species in some parts of eastern North America.

== Toxicity ==
The fruits are considered highly toxic to humans. May cause symptoms of difficult breathing, weakness, excitement, pupil dilation, abdominal pains, vomiting, spasms, convulsions, coma, and respiratory failure. Fruits may be fatal if eaten.

== References and external links ==
- Flora of China
