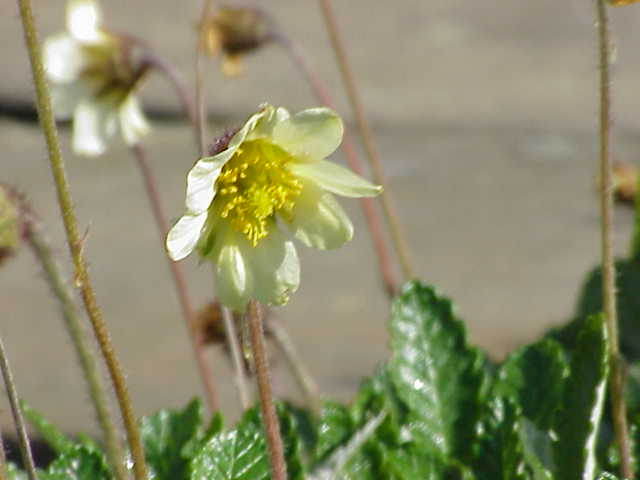
- Dryas × suendermannii

Scientific classification
- Kingdom: Plantae
- Clade: Tracheophytes
- Clade: Angiosperms
- Clade: Eudicots
- Clade: Rosids
- Order: Rosales
- Family: Rosaceae
- Subfamily: Dryadoideae (Lam. & DC.) Sweet

Genera
- Cercocarpus Kunth; Chamaebatia Benth.; Dryas L.; Purshia DC. ex Poir. (including Cowania)

= Dryadoideae =

Subfamily of flowering plants

The subfamily Dryadoideae consists of four genera in the family Rosaceae, all of which contain representative species with root nodules that host the nitrogen-fixing bacterium Frankia. They are subshrubs, shrubs, or small trees with a base chromosome number of 9, whose fruits are either an achene or an aggregate of achenes. It includes five genera (Dryas, Cercocarpus, Chamaebatia, Cowania, and Purshia), all of which except the first only occur in North America.

== Taxonomic history ==
The subfamily has at various times been separated as its own family (Dryadaceae), or as a tribe (Dryadeae) or subtribe (Dryadinae).
