= List of Phellinus species =

This is a list of the fungus species in the genus Phellinus. There are 94 commonly accepted species though up to 220 species have been noted.

- Phellinus acifer (Y.C. Dai) T. Hatt. (1999)
- Phellinus adamantinus (Berk.) Ryvarden (1972)
- Phellinus allardii (Bres.) S. Ahmad (1972)
- Phellinus amazonicus Camp.-Sant. & Decock (2016)
- Phellinus artemisiae Vlasák & J. Vlasák (2017)
- Phellinus austrosinensis L.S. Bian (2015)
- Phellinus beninensis Olou & Ryvarden (2021)
- Phellinus betulinus (Murrill) Parmasto (2007)
- Phellinus bicuspidatus Lombard & M.J. Larsen (1985)
- Phellinus cancriformans (M.J. Larsen, Lombard & Aho) M.J. Larsen & Lombard (1990)
- Phellinus caryophylli (Racib.) G. Cunn. (1965)
- Phellinus castanopsidis B.K. Cui, Y.C. Dai & Decock (2012)
- Phellinus chrysoloma (Fr.) Donk (1971)
- Phellinus cinchonensis (Murrill) Ryvarden (1972)
- Phellinus cuspidatus Y.C. Dai & F. Wu (2022)
- Phellinus deuteroprunicola T.T. Chang & W.N. Chou (2000)
- Phellinus ellipsoideus (B.K. Cui & Y.C. Dai) B.K. Cui, Y.C. Dai & Decock (2012)
- Phellinus erectus A. David, Dequatre & Fiasson (1982)
- Phellinus eugeniae T.T. Chang (1995)
- Phellinus fastuosus (Lév.) S. Ahmad (1972)
- Phellinus ferrugineovelutinus (Henn.) Ryvarden (1972)
- Phellinus formosanus T.T. Chang & W.N. Chou (1999)
- Phellinus fragrans M.J. Larsen & Lombard (1976)
- Phellinus gabonensis Decock & Yombiy. (2011)
- Phellinus grenadensis (Murrill) Ryvarden (1972)
- Phellinus guttiformis Tchotet, M.P.A. Coetzee, Rajchenb. & Jol. Roux (2020)
- Phellinus hartigii (Allesch. & Schnabl) Pat. (1903)
- Phellinus igniarius (L.) Quél. (1886)
- Phellinus kamahi (G. Cunn.) P.K. Buchanan & Ryvarden (1988)
- Phellinus krugiodendri (Y.C. Dai, X.H. Ji & Vlasák) Ryvarden (2023)
- Phellinus laevigatus (P. Karst.) Bourdot & Galzin (1928)
- Phellinus livescens (Speg.) Rajchenb. (1988)
- Phellinus lundellii Niemelä (1972)
- Phellinus macroferreus T. Hatt. & Ryvarden (1996)
- Phellinus mangrovei (Y.C. Dai, X.H. Ji & J. Vlasák) Ryvarden (2023)
- Phellinus mituliformis Corner (1991)
- Phellinus montanus (Y.C. Dai & Niemelä) Y.C. Dai (2005)
- Phellinus monticola L.W. Zhou & Y.C. Dai (2016)
- Phellinus mori Y.C. Dai & B.K. Cui (2008)
- Phellinus neolundellii Zmitr., Malysheva, Psurtseva & Spirin (2005)
- Phellinus neoquercinus M.J. Larsen (1990)
- Phellinus nicaraguensis (Murrill) S. Herrera & Bondartseva (1980)
- Phellinus niemelaei (M. Fisch.) Zmitr., Malysheva & Spirin (2006)
- Phellinus nilgheriensis (Mont.) G. Cunn. (1965)
- Phellinus orientoasiaticus L.W. Zhou & Y.C. Dai (2016)
- Phellinus ossatus M. Fisch. (1987)
- Phellinus padicola L.W. Zhou & Y.C. Dai (2016)
- Phellinus palmicola (Berk. & M.A. Curtis) Ryvarden (1972)
- Phellinus palomari (Vlasák & Ryvarden) Ryvarden (2023)
- Phellinus parmastoi L.W. Zhou & Y.C. Dai (2016)
- Phellinus piceicola B.K. Cui & Y.C. Dai (2012)
- Phellinus piceinus (Peck) Pat. (1900)
- Phellinus pomaceoides L.W. Zhou & Y.C. Dai (2016)
- Phellinus pomaceus (Pers.) Maire (1933)
- Phellinus populicola Niemelä (1975)
- Phellinus prunicola (Murrill) Gilb. (1979)
- Phellinus pseudoigniarius Y.C. Dai & F. Yang (2008)
- Phellinus punctatiformis (Murrill) Ryvarden (1972)
- Phellinus pusillus (Lloyd) Ryvarden (1989)
- Phellinus quercinus Bondartsev & Ljub. (1965)
- Phellinus resupinatus M. Fisch., Cloete, L. Mostert & Halleen (2016)
- Phellinus rimosus (Berk.) Pilát (1940)
- Phellinus sarcites (Fr.) Ryvarden (1972)
- Phellinus scleropileatus X.L. Zeng (1987)
- Phellinus setulosus (Lloyd) Imazeki (1943)
- Phellinus sonorae Gilb. (1979)
- Phellinus spadiceus (Cooke) G. Cunn. (1965)
- Phellinus spiculosus (W.A. Campb. & R.W. Davidson) Niemelä (1972)
- Phellinus subellipsoideus Y.C. Dai & F. Wu (2022)
- Phellinus sublaevigatus (Cleland & Rodway) P.K. Buchanan & Ryvarden (1993)
- Phellinus swieteniae (Murrill) S. Herrera & Bondartseva (1980)
- Phellinus syringeus X.L. Zeng (1987)
- Phellinus tawhai (G. Cunn.) G. Cunn. (1965)
- Phellinus transversus Corner (1991)
- Phellinus tremulae (Bondartsev) Bondartsev & P.N. Borisov (1953)
- Phellinus turbinatus Ryvarden (2004)
- Phellinus viticola (Schwein.) Donk (1966)
- Phellinus williamsii (Murrill) Pat. (1914)
- Phellinus yucatanensis (Murrill) Imazeki (1943)
- Phellinus yunnanensis (Y.C. Dai) Y.C. Dai (2011)
- Phellinus zealandicus (Cooke) Teng (1963)
