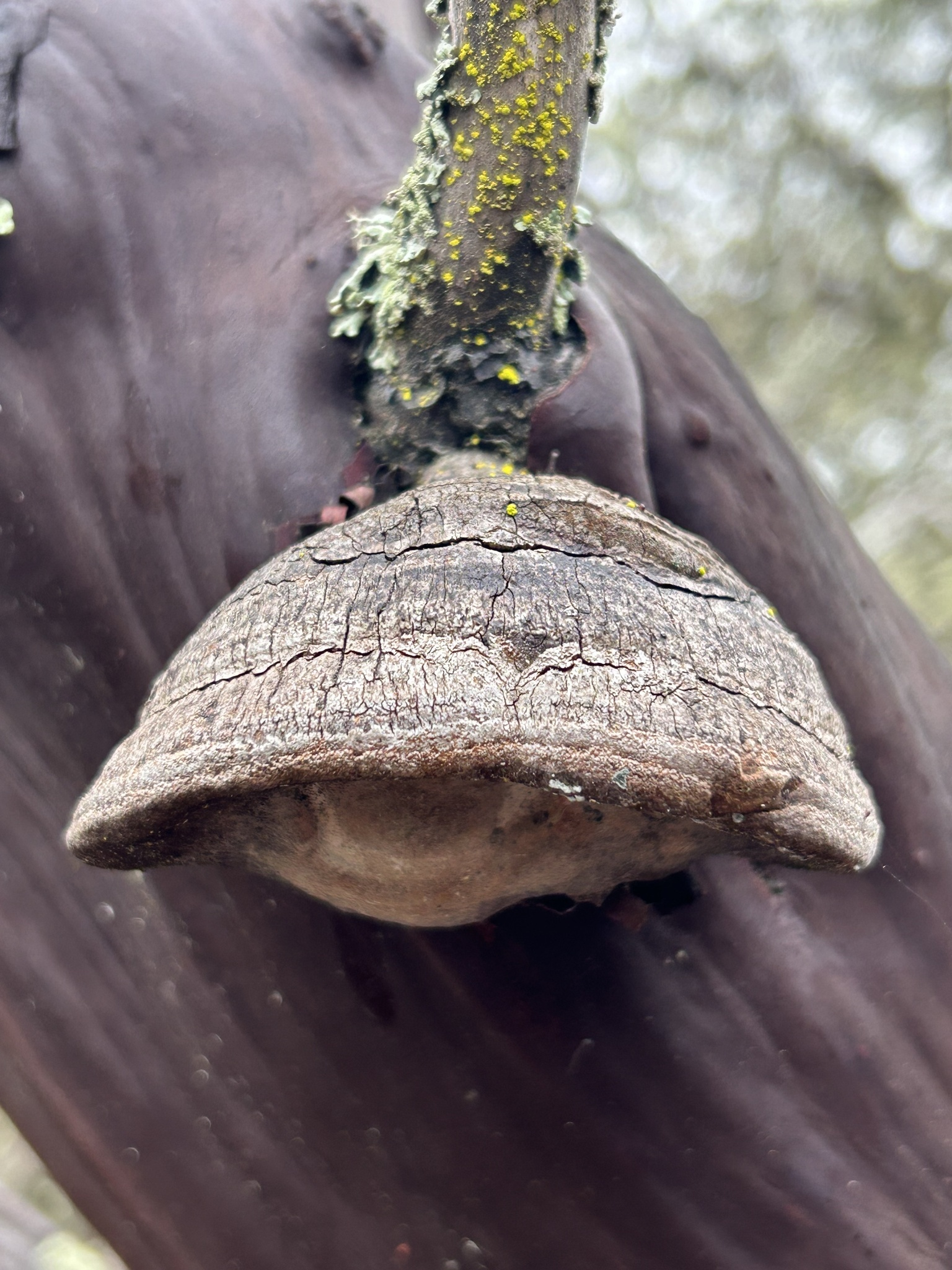

Scientific classification
- Kingdom: Fungi
- Division: Basidiomycota
- Class: Agaricomycetes
- Order: Hymenochaetales
- Family: Hymenochaetaceae
- Genus: Phellinus
- Species: P. arctostaphyli

Binomial name
- Phellinus arctostaphyli (Long) Niemelä

Synonyms
- Fomes arctostaphyli

= Phellinus arctostaphyli =

Manzanita conk

Species of fungus

Phellinus arctostaphyli, also known as the manzanita conk or the manzanita hoof polypore, is a species of shelf fungus. Native to western North America, this saprotrophic fungus only colonizes the wood of Ceanothus, Adenostoma, and Arctostaphylos. P. arctostaphyli is closely to related to three other North American Phellinus species, including Phellinus tremulae and Phellinus tuberculosus. However, in part due to the "economic insignificance of its hosts," P. arctostaphyli is relatively poorly studied as an individual species.

The conks or hoofs (basidiocarps) appear perennially, are tough and woody themselves, with tiny pores on the underside and black to gray rings on top that are prone to fracturing longitudinally.

This species was first described by William Henry Long in 1917 as Fomes arctostaphyli. In 1954, mycologist Josiah L. Lowe argued that it was a synonym of Fomes igniarius. Tuomo Niemelä moved it into the genus Phellinus in 1975. The presence of P. arctostaphyli has been correlated with manzanita mortality in Mexico.
