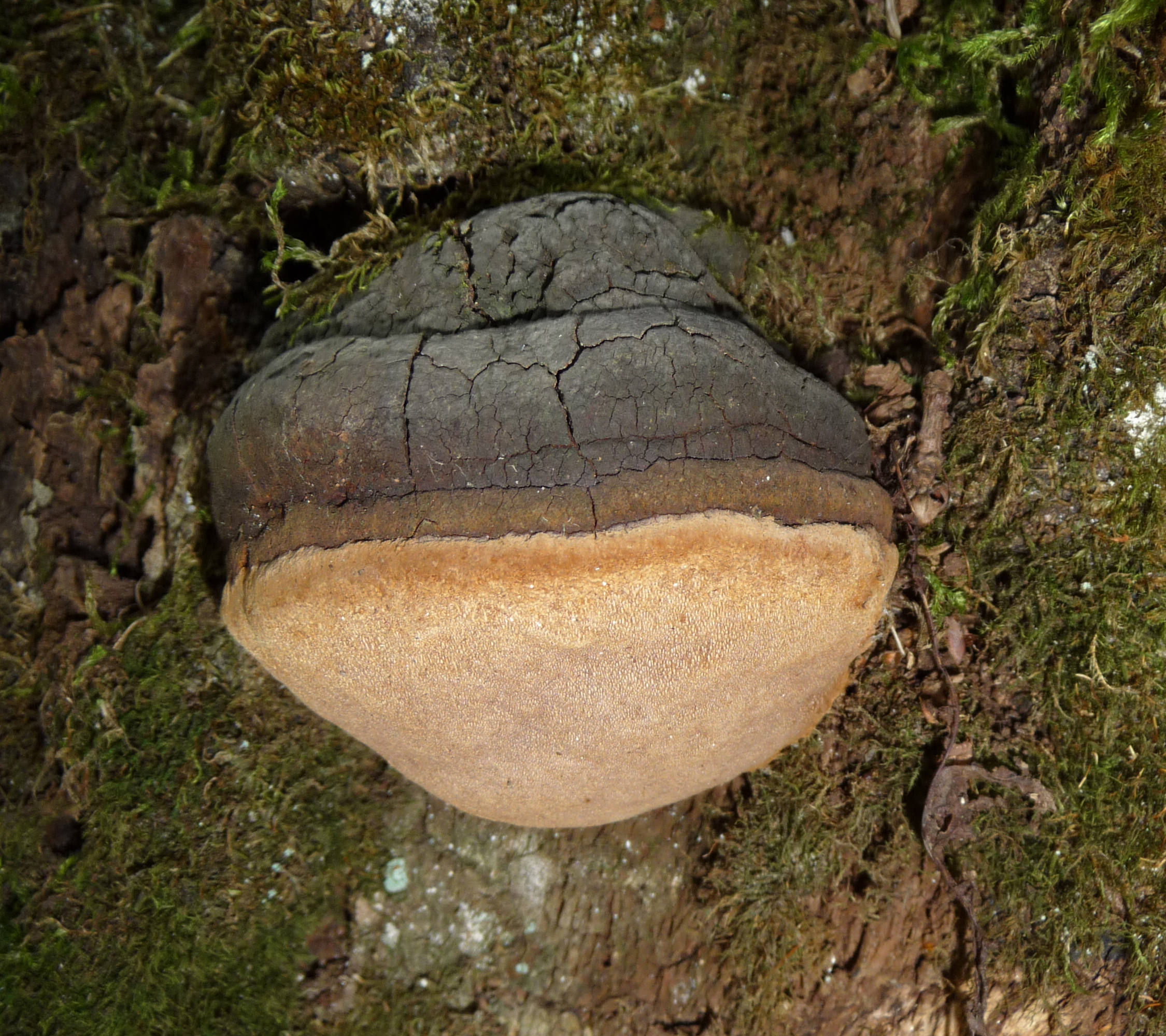

Scientific classification
- Kingdom: Fungi
- Division: Basidiomycota
- Class: Agaricomycetes
- Order: Hymenochaetales
- Family: Hymenochaetaceae
- Genus: Phellinus
- Species: P. igniarius

Binomial name
- Phellinus igniarius (L.) Quél. (1886)

Synonyms
- Boletus igniarius L. (1753); Phellinus alni (Bondartsev) Parmasto, 1976

= Phellinus igniarius =

Species of fungus

Phellinus igniarius (syn. Phellinus trivialis), commonly known as the willow bracket, fire sponge, false tinder polypore, punk ash polypore, or false tinder conk, is a fungus of the family Hymenochaetaceae. Like other members of the genus of Phellinus, it lives by saprotrophic nutrition, in which the lignin and cellulose of a host tree is degraded and is a cause of white rot.

The fungus forms perennial fruiting bodies that rise as woody-hard, hoof or disc-shaped brackets from the bark of the infested living tree or dead log. The tree species is often willow but it may be commonly found on birch and alder and other broad leafed trees. The top is covered with a dark, often cracked crust, a stem is present only in its infancy. Unlike most fungi, it has a hard woody consistency and may persist for many years, building a new surface layer each year.

== Description ==
The bracket measures 5–20 centimetres (2–8 in) in diameter, but in rare cases may be 40 cm wide. The thickness of the bracket varies from 2–12 cm (1–4 1/2 in), to 20 cm in exceptional cases. These conks are among the longest persisting fungal fruit bodies, displaying up to eighty annual growth rings. The fungus has small, grayish brown pores, about 4–6 per square millimetre. Its tubes have a length of about 2–7 mm (1/8–1/4 in). Each year, the fungus forms a new layer of tubes superimposed on the old layers. Unreleased old spores often find themselves sealed in by later growth that clog the tubes and they appear in cross section as brown spots.

The brown flesh is 10–20 cm (4–8 in) thick and becomes harder with age and dryness, softer with humidity. The smell of the fruit body has a pronounced mushroom character, the flavor of the meat is bitter. Upon contact with potassium hydroxide, the flesh is dyed black. The spores form a whitish cast.

=== Similar species ===
Similar species include P. arctostaphyli, P. pomaceoides, P. tremulae, Fulvifomes robiniae, and members of Fomitiporia.

== Ecology ==
The species is a polypore, with pores on the underside that bear basidiospores. The species causes a white rot that leads to the tree to decay. Woodpeckers are known to favour its site as a good place to excavate a nesting chamber since the wood will be soft and weaker around its location.

== Uses ==
The species is considered to be inedible, being woodlike. There is some evidence that it may have potential medicinal uses. A 2014 study in mice suggests an extract of the mushroom fruit body may have a high therapeutic potential for ameliorating multiple sclerosis progression.

It was prized as kindling material. In Alaska, it is burnt by locals, and the ash (punk ash) is mixed with chewing tobacco to enhance the effect of the nicotine.

== Gallery ==
Phellinus igniarius
- Mycological characteristics
- Pores on hymenium
- No distinct cap
- Hymenium attachment is irregular or not applicable
- Lacks a stipe
- Ecology is parasitic
- Edibility is inedible

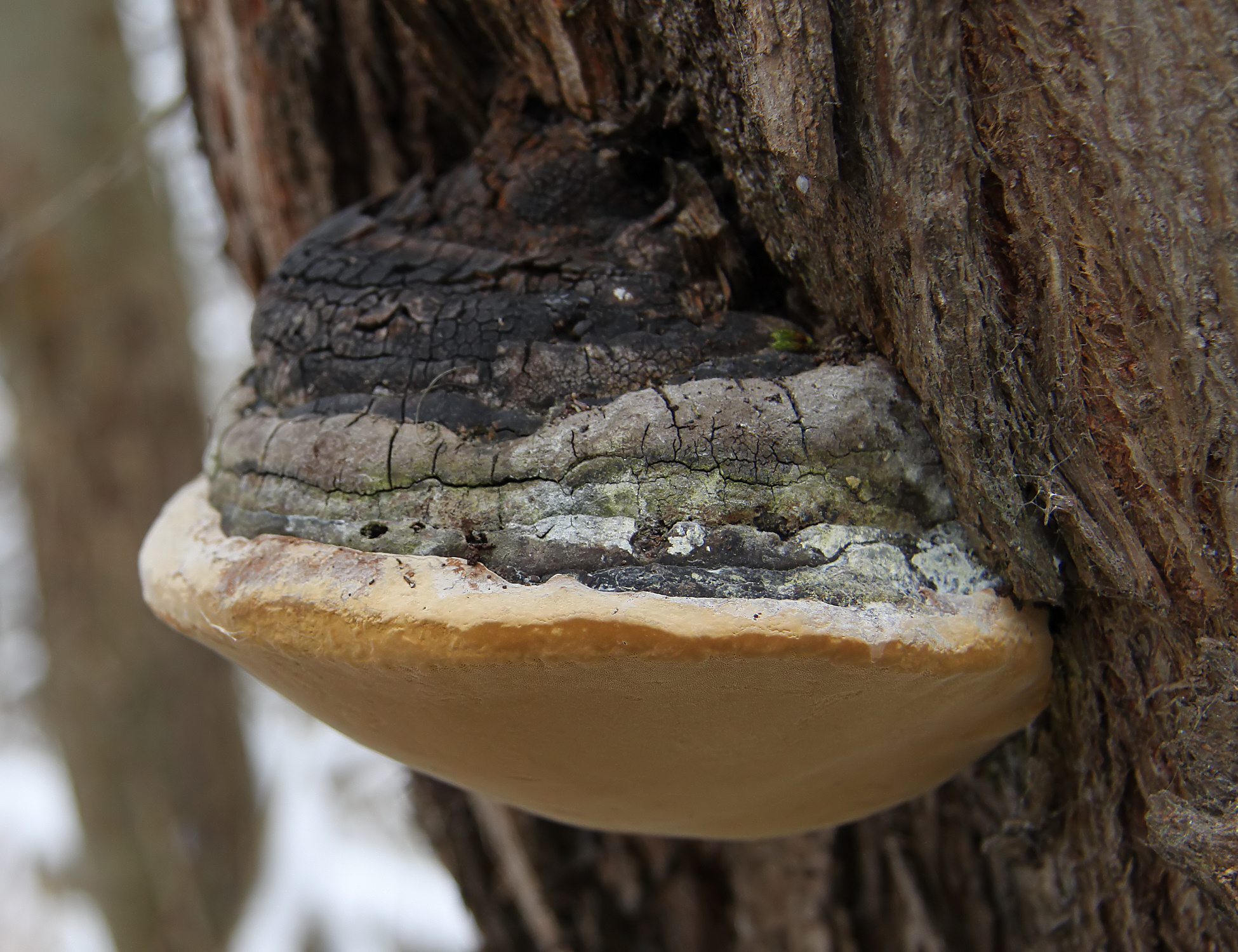
Phellinus igniarius seen in winter in Strakonice District, Czech Republic

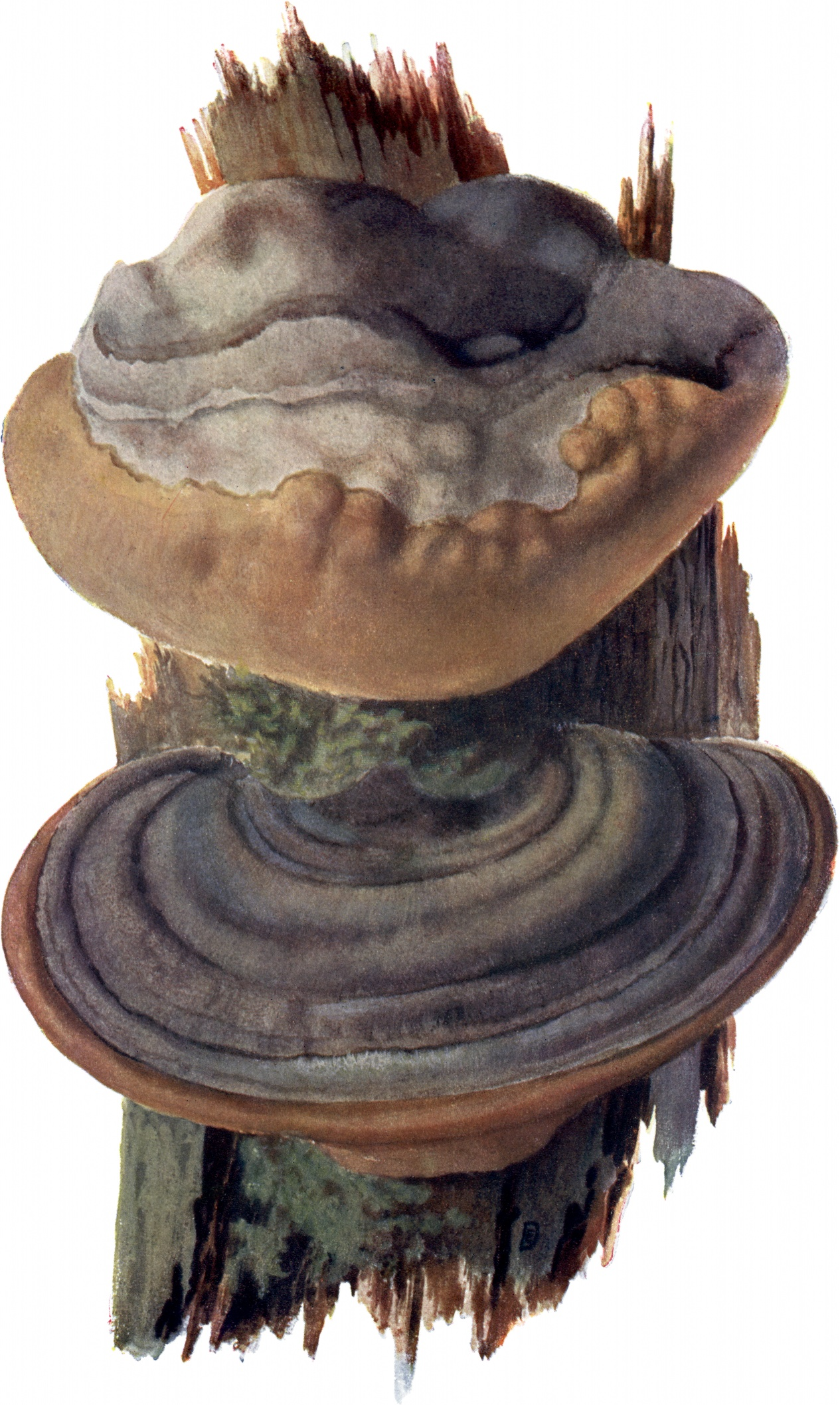
Illustrated in Schmeil's scientific atlas

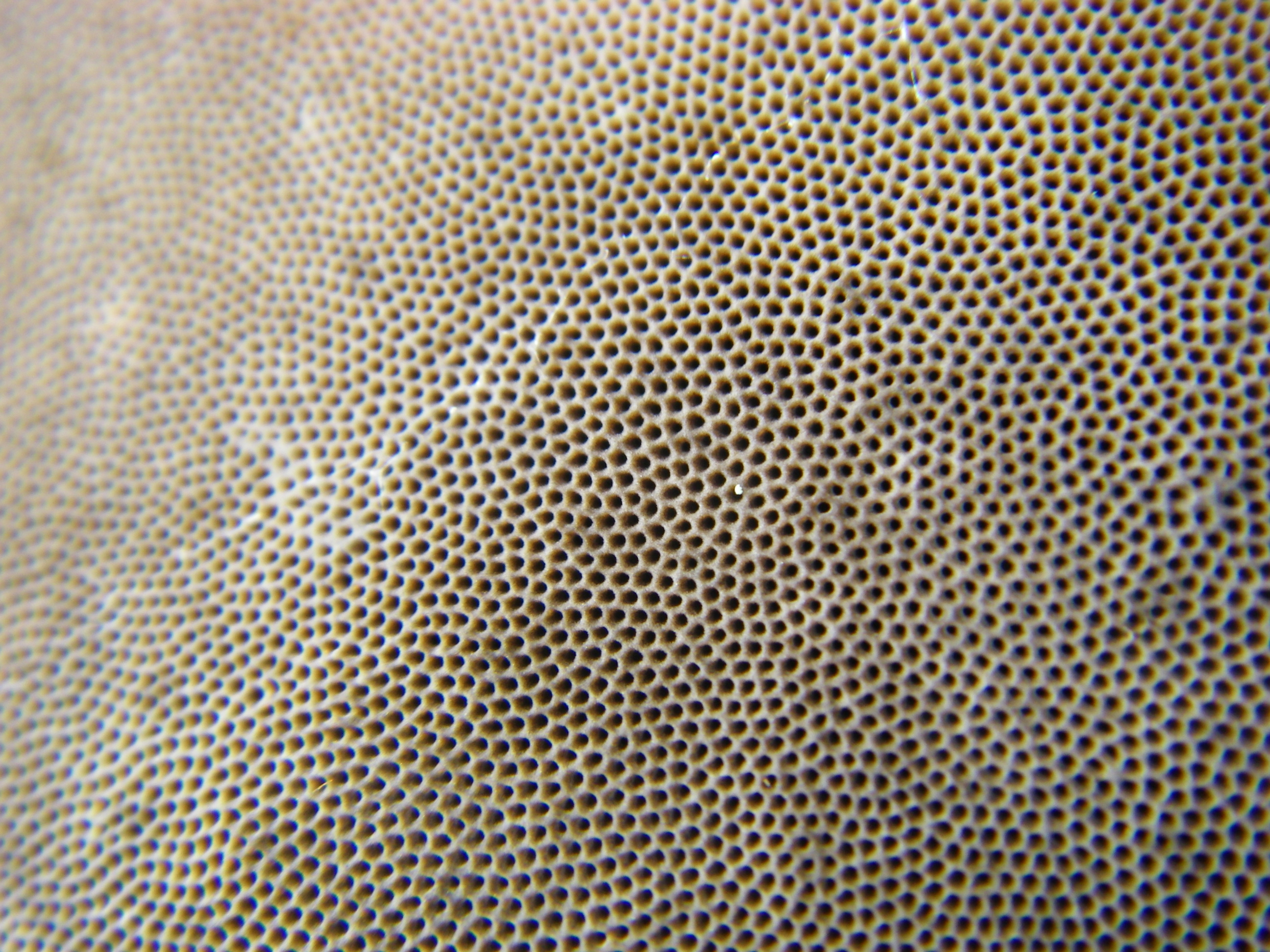
The pores on the lower surface, magnified

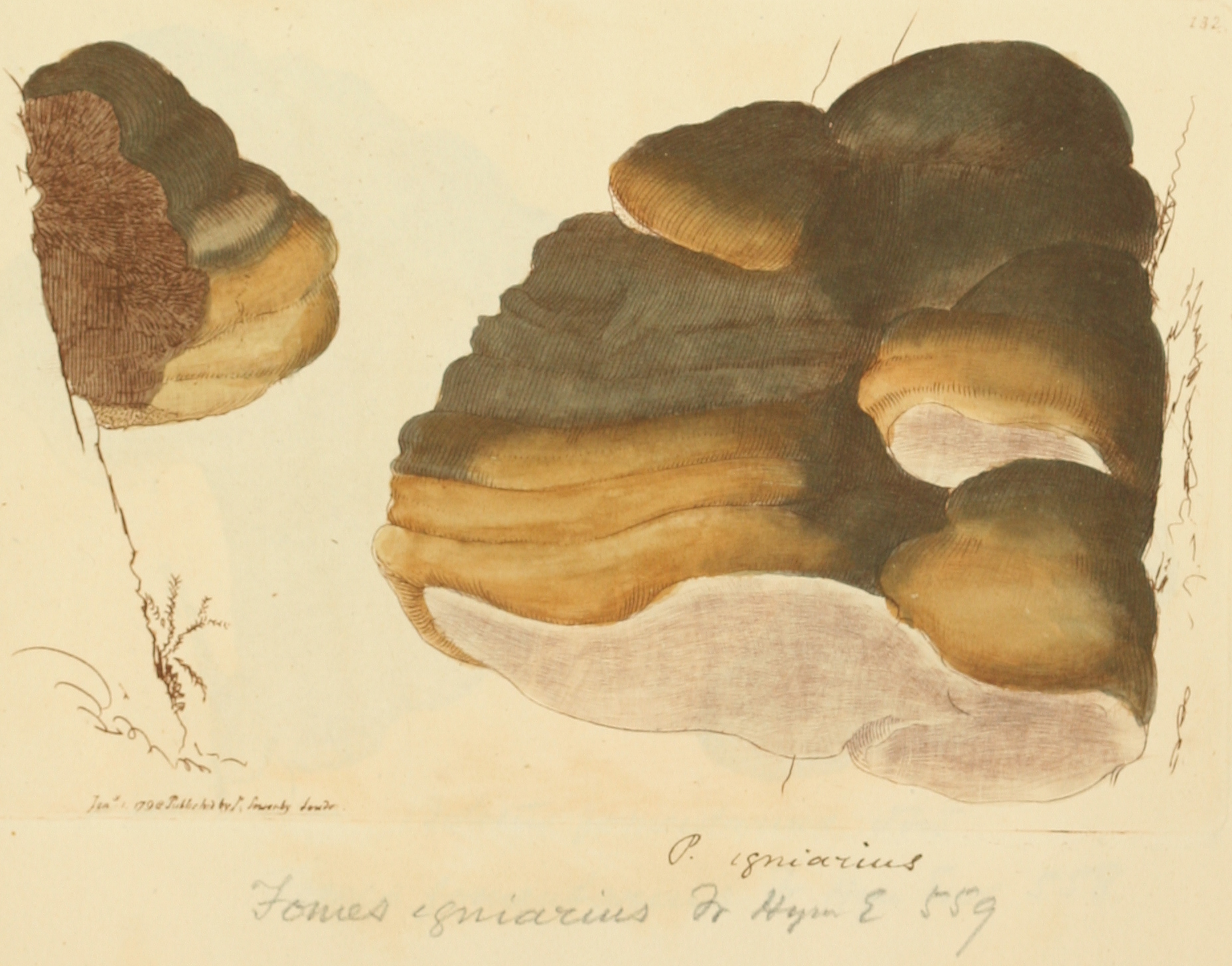
Illustrated in James Sowerby's Coloured Figures of English Fungi or Mushrooms, (published 1797–1809)
