= C7H12O5 =

The molecular formula C_{7}H_{12}O_{5} (molar mass: 176.17 g/mol, exact mass: 176.0685 u) may refer to:

- Cyclophellitol
- Glyceryl diacetate
- Isopropylmalic acid
- Valienol
