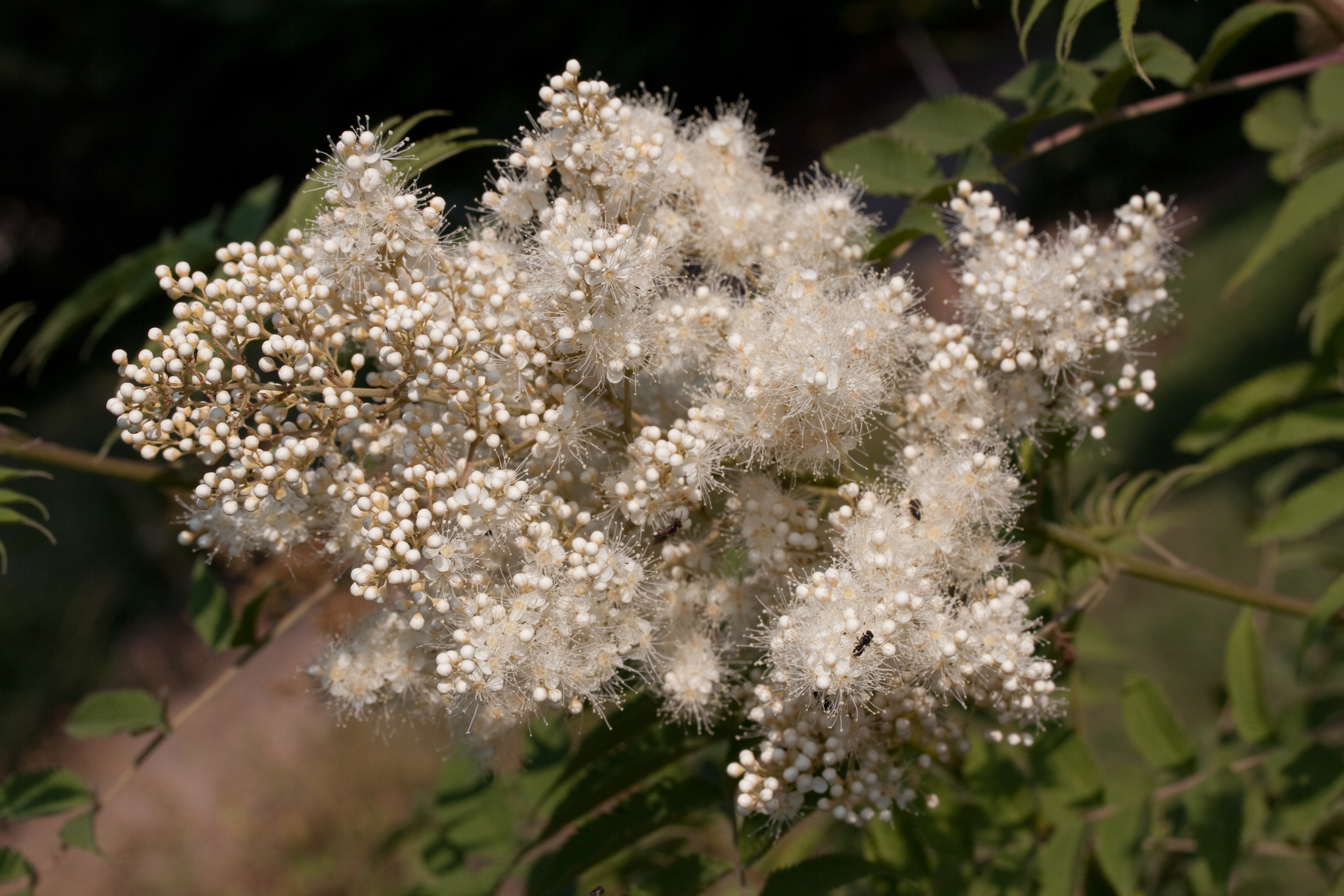
- Sorbaria grandiflora

Scientific classification
- Kingdom: Plantae
- Clade: Tracheophytes
- Clade: Angiosperms
- Clade: Eudicots
- Clade: Rosids
- Order: Rosales
- Family: Rosaceae
- Subfamily: Amygdaloideae
- Tribe: Sorbarieae; Rydb.

Genera
- Adenostoma Hook. & Arn.; Chamaebatiaria (Porter ex W.H.Brewer & S.Watson) Maxim.; Sorbaria (Ser.) A. Braun; Spiraeanthus (Fisch. & C.A.Mey.) Maxim.

= Sorbarieae =

Tribe of flowering plants

Sorbarieae is a tribe of the rose family, Rosaceae, belonging to the subfamily Amygdaloideae.
