= Isocitrate/isopropylmalate dehydrogenase family =

Isocitrate/isopropylmalate dehydrogenase
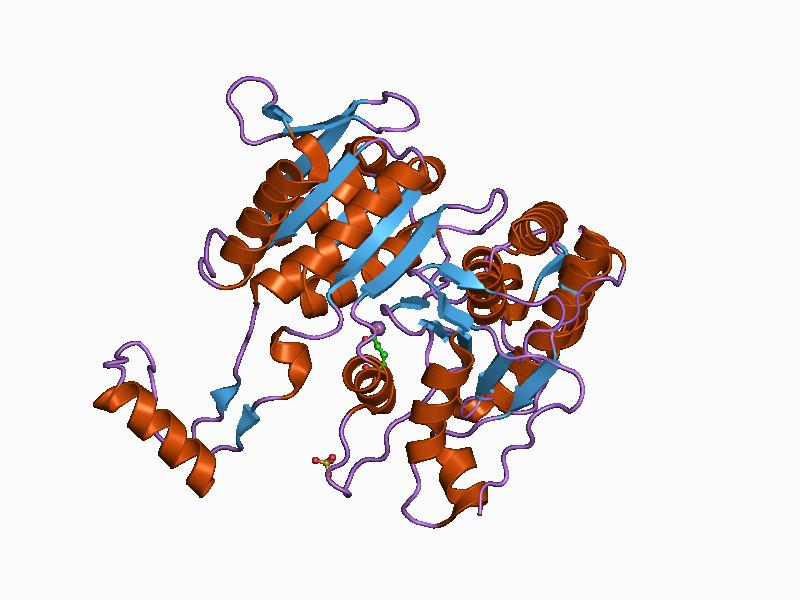
- crystal structure of k230m isocitrate dehydrogenase in complex with alpha-ketoglutarate

Identifiers
- Symbol: Iso_dh
- Pfam: PF00180
- Pfam clan: CL0270
- InterPro: IPR001804
- PROSITE: PDOC00389
- SCOP2: 1hex / SCOPe / SUPFAM
Available protein structures:
- PDB: IPR001804 PF00180 (ECOD; PDBsum)
- AlphaFold: IPR001804; PF00180

In molecular biology, the isocitrate/isopropylmalate dehydrogenase family is a protein family consisting of the evolutionary related enzymes isocitrate dehydrogenase, 3-isopropylmalate dehydrogenase and tartrate dehydrogenase.

Isocitrate dehydrogenase (IDH), is an important enzyme of carbohydrate metabolism which catalyses the oxidative decarboxylation of isocitrate into alpha-ketoglutarate. IDH is either dependent on NAD^{+} EC 1.1.1.41 or on NADP^{+} EC 1.1.1.42. In eukaryotes there are at least three isozymes of IDH: two are located in the mitochondrial matrix (one NAD^{+}-dependent, the other NADP^{+}-dependent), while the third one (also NADP^{+}-dependent) is cytoplasmic. In Escherichia coli the activity of a NADP^{+}-dependent form of the enzyme is controlled by the phosphorylation of a serine residue; the phosphorylated form of IDH is completely inactivated.

3-isopropylmalate dehydrogenase EC 1.1.1.85 (IMDH) catalyses the third step in the biosynthesis of leucine in bacteria and fungi, the oxidative decarboxylation of 3-isopropylmalate into 2-oxo-4-methylvalerate.

Tartrate dehydrogenase EC 1.1.1.93 catalyses the reduction of tartrate to oxaloglycolate.
