= Interfungin =

- Interfungin A

- Interfungin B

- Interfungin C

Identifiers
3D model (JSmol)	A: Interactive image; B: Interactive image; C: Interactive image
ChemSpider	A: 23283928; B: 23283929; C: 23283930
PubChem CID	A: 54726789; B: 54718836; C: 54726790
- InChI: A: InChI=1S/C25H20O9/c1-13(26)8-20(29)17(9-15-4-7-19(28)22(31)11-15)24-23(32)12-16(34-25(24)33)5-2-14-3-6-18(27)21(30)10-14/h2-12,27-32H,1H3/b5-2+,17-9+,20-8- Key: SDJYPLYGBCMOGL-RRAWIICHSA-N; B: InChI=1S/C23H18O8/c1-12(24)16(8-14-4-7-18(26)20(28)10-14)22-21(29)11-15(31-23(22)30)5-2-13-3-6-17(25)19(27)9-13/h2-11,25-29H,1H3/b5-2+,16-8+ Key: DLJCBBHVLOHCCV-DVTHBBLZSA-N; C: InChI=1S/C23H18O9/c1-31-22(29)15(8-13-4-7-17(25)19(27)10-13)21-20(28)11-14(32-23(21)30)5-2-12-3-6-16(24)18(26)9-12/h2-11,24-28H,1H3/b5-2+,15-8- Key: KSCNEEIWGUYULB-GMKMYQCMSA-N
- SMILES: A: CC(=O)/C=C(/C(=C\C1=CC(=C(C=C1)O)O)/C2=C(C=C(OC2=O)/C=C/C3=CC(=C(C=C3)O)O)O)\O; B: CC(=O)/C(=C\C1=CC(=C(C=C1)O)O)/C2=C(C=C(OC2=O)/C=C/C3=CC(=C(C=C3)O)O)O; C: COC(=O)/C(=C\C1=CC(=C(C=C1)O)O)/C2=C(C=C(OC2=O)/C=C/C3=CC(=C(C=C3)O)O)O

Properties
Chemical formula	A: C_{25}H_{20}O_{9} B: C_{23}H_{18}O_{8} C: C_{23}H_{18}O_{9}
- Except where otherwise noted, data are given for materials in their standard state (at 25 °C [77 °F], 100 kPa). Infobox references

Interfungins are a group of chemical compounds isolated from fungi in the genus Phellinus which have NF-κB inhibitory activities.
