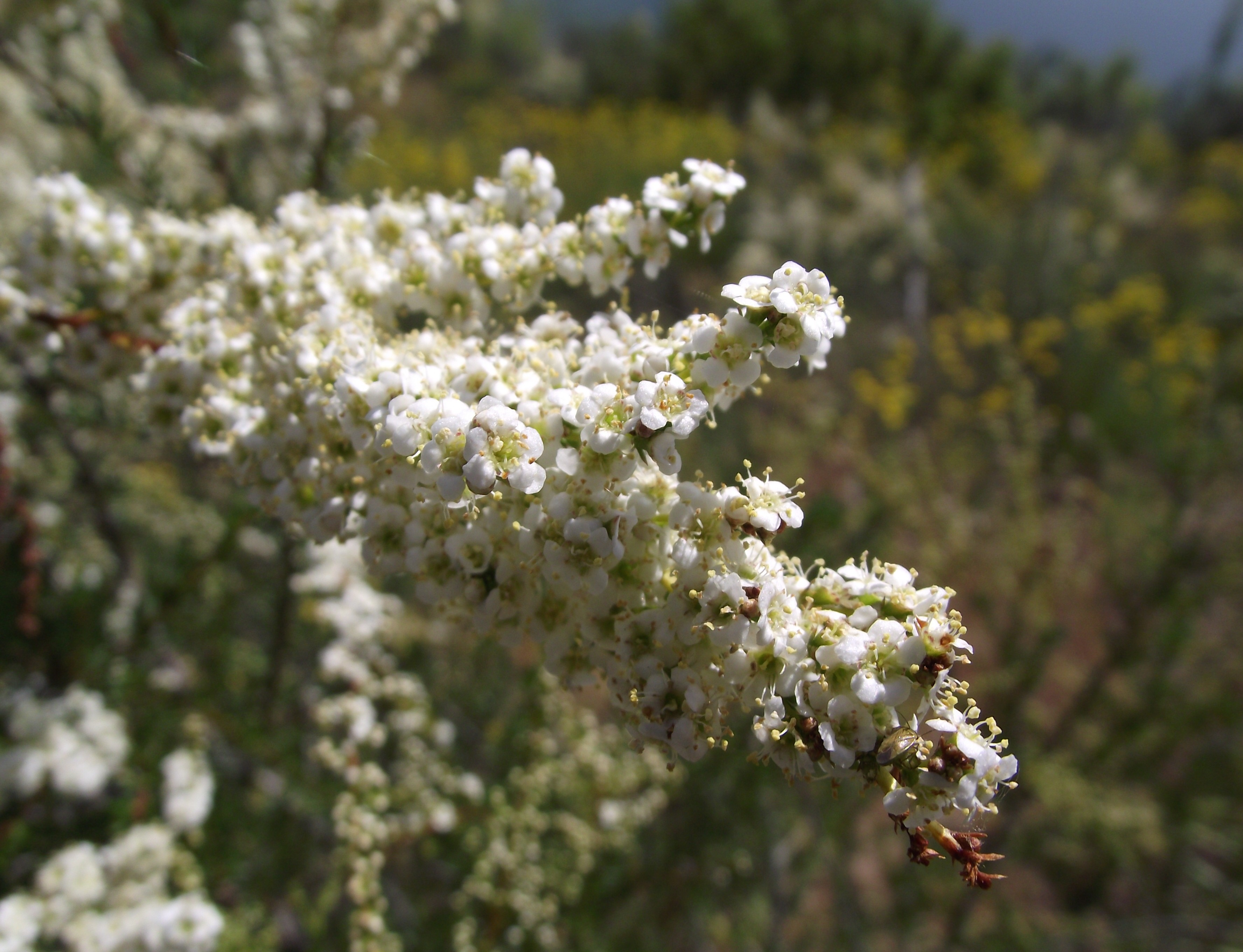
- Adenostoma fasciculatum in flower

Scientific classification
- Kingdom: Plantae
- Clade: Tracheophytes
- Clade: Angiosperms
- Clade: Eudicots
- Clade: Rosids
- Order: Rosales
- Family: Rosaceae
- Subfamily: Amygdaloideae
- Tribe: Sorbarieae
- Genus: Adenostoma; Hook. & Arn.

= Adenostoma =

Genus of flowering plants

Adenostoma is a genus of shrubs in the rose family (Rosaceae) containing only two species, chamise (Adenostoma fasciculatum) and redshanks (Adenostoma sparsifolium). Both are native to the Californias.

== Description ==
=== Characteristics ===
The plants grow in a habit of shrubs to small trees, and the stem is more or less resinous. Both species in this genus feature stiff, linear leaves arranged alternately or in clusters along stems with shredding bark. Flowers form on a panicle, are cream to white and, as in all members of the rose family, have hypanthia. The fruit is an achene. Chromosome number is 2n = 18.

=== Distribution and habitat ===
Both species are native to coastal California and Baja California. Adenostoma fasciculatum is also native to California in the Sierra Nevada. They are found in plant communities and sub-ecoregions of the California chaparral and woodlands ecoregion.

== Taxonomy ==
Species of Adenostoma

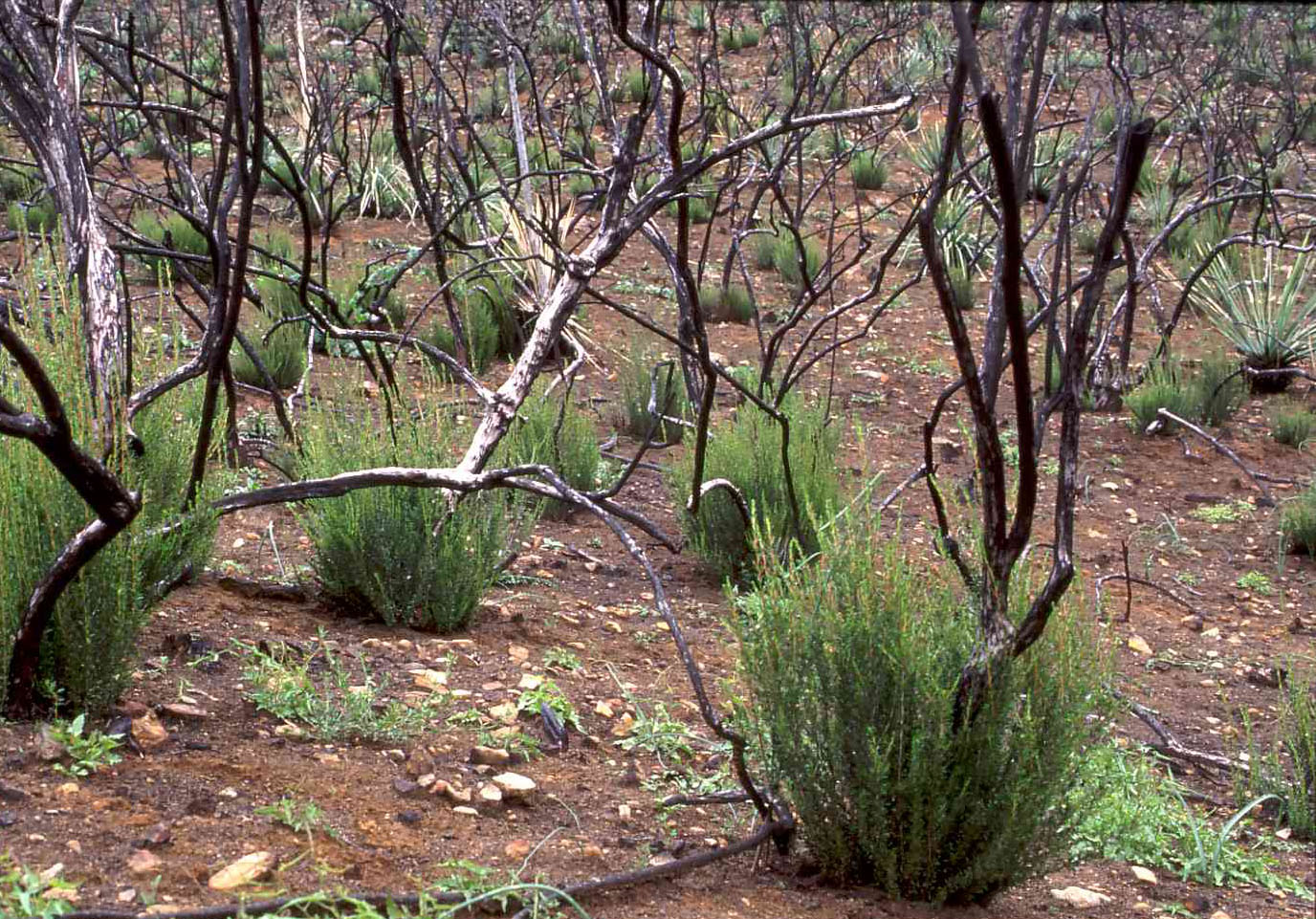
Adenostoma fasciculatum Hook. & Arn. - Chamise

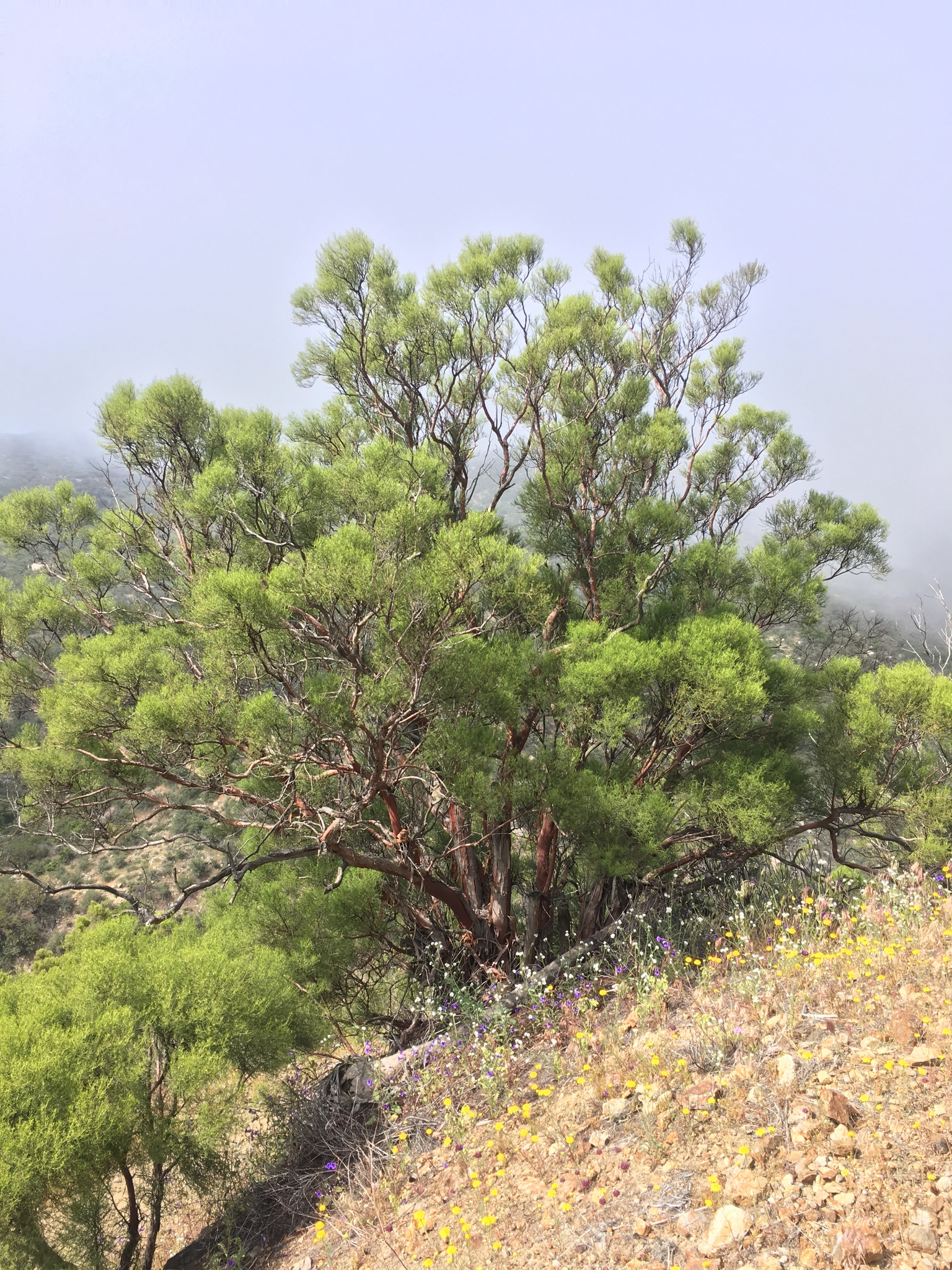
Adenostoma sparsifolium Torr. - Redshanks

Phylogenetic analysis places Adenostoma closest to Chamaebatiaria and Sorbaria, and suggests tentative placement in the subfamily Spiraeoideae, tribe Sorbarieae. The name Adenostoma comes from Greek, meaning "glandular mouth," referring to the hypanthium ring gland.
