= False goat's beard =

False goat's beard is a common name for several plants and may refer to:

- Astilbe, native to Asia and North America
- Sorbaria sorbifolia, native to Asia
