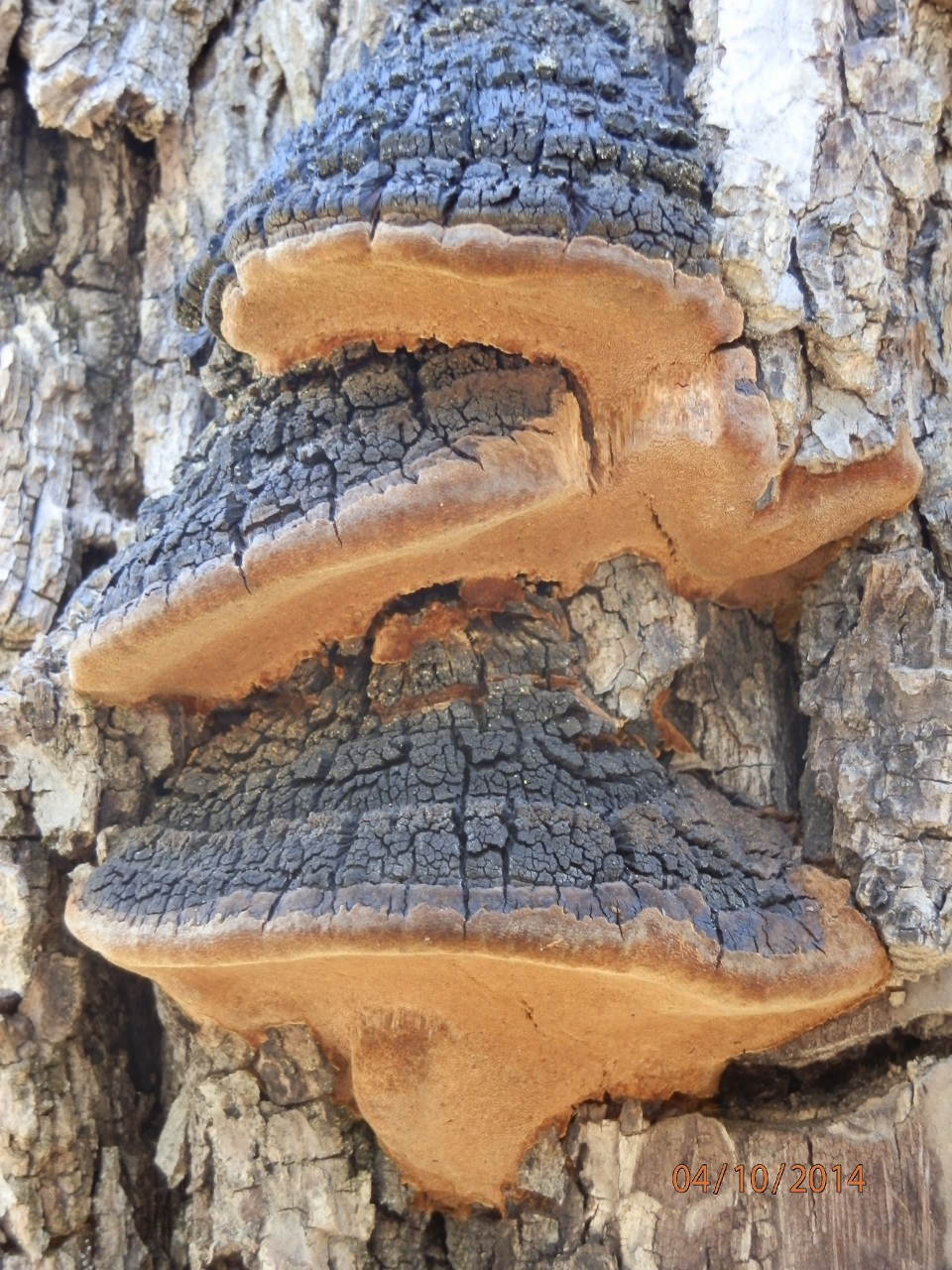
- Fulvifomes everhartii

Scientific classification
- Domain: Eukaryota
- Kingdom: Fungi
- Division: Basidiomycota
- Class: Agaricomycetes
- Order: Hymenochaetales
- Family: Hymenochaetaceae
- Genus: Fulvifomes; Murrill (1903)

Type species
- Fulvifomes robiniae Murrill (1903)

Synonyms
- Phellinus; Pyropolyporus

= Fulvifomes =

Genus of fungi

Fulvifomes is a genus of fungi in the family Hymenochaetaceae. It was formerly considered synonymous with the genus Phellinus, but it was resurrected based on morphological and molecular phylogenetic evidence.

== Description ==
Fulvifomes is a characterized by a dimitic hyphal system, an absence of setae, coloured basidiospores, and pileate basidiomata.

== Etymology ==
The genus name comes from the Latin word fulvus, meaning tawny.

== Taxonomy ==
Fulvifomes contains the following species:

- Fulvifomes acontextus
- Fulvifomes allardii
- Fulvifomes aulaxinus
- Fulvifomes aureobrunneus
- Fulvifomes azonatus
- Fulvifomes boninensis
- Fulvifomes caligoporus
- Fulvifomes cedrelae
- Fulvifomes centroamericanus
- Fulvifomes coffeatoporus
- Fulvifomes collinus
- Fulvifomes costaricense
- Fulvifomes crocatus
- Fulvifomes dracaenicola
- Fulvifomes durissimus
- Fulvifomes elaeodendri
- Fulvifomes everhartii
- Fulvifomes fabaceicola
- Fulvifomes fastuosus
- Fulvifomes floridanus
- Fulvifomes fushanianus
- Fulvifomes grenadensis
- Fulvifomes hainanensis
- Fulvifomes halophilus
- Fulvifomes imazekii
- Fulvifomes imbricatus
- Fulvifomes indicus
- Fulvifomes inermis
- Fulvifomes johnsonianus
- Fulvifomes jouzaii
- Fulvifomes karitianaensis
- Fulvifomes kawakamii
- Fulvifomes kravtzevii
- Fulvifomes krugiodendri
- Fulvifomes lloydii
- Fulvifomes luteoumbrinus
- Fulvifomes mangrovicus
- Fulvifomes mangroviensis
- Fulvifomes mcgregorii
- Fulvifomes melleoporus
- Fulvifomes merrillii
- Fulvifomes minutiporus
- Fulvifomes nakasoneae
- Fulvifomes newtoniae
- Fulvifomes nilgheriensis
- Fulvifomes nonggangensis
- Fulvifomes pappianus
- Fulvifomes popoffii
- Fulvifomes rhytiphloeus
- Fulvifomes rigidus
- Fulvifomes rimosus
- Fulvifomes robiniae
- Fulvifomes siamensis
- Fulvifomes squamosus
- Fulvifomes subindicus
- Fulvifomes submerrillii
- Fulvifomes tepperi
- Fulvifomes thailandicus
- Fulvifomes tubogeneratus
- Fulvifomes umbrinellus
- Fulvifomes waimriatroariensis
- Fulvifomes xylocarpicola
- Fulvifomes yoroui
