= Schizonotus =

Schizonotus may refer to:

== Animals ==
- Schizonotus (wasp), a genus of parasitic wasps in the subfamily Pteromalinae

== Plants ==
- A rejected synonym of Sorbaria, in family Rosaceae
- An illegitimate synonym of Asclepias, in family Apocynaceae
- An illegitimate synonym of Holodiscus, in family Rosaceae
