= Isopropylmalic acid =

- 2-Isopropylmalic acid

- 3-Isopropylmalic acid

Names
- IUPAC names 3-Isopropylmalic acid 2-Hydroxy-3-isopropylsuccinic acid
- Other names Isopropylmalate

Identifiers
CAS Number	(2): 3237-44-3; (3): 16048-89-8
3D model (JSmol)	(2): Interactive image; (3): Interactive image
ChEBI	(2): CHEBI:28635; (3): CHEBI:35114
ChemSpider	(2): 76; (3): 35
DrugBank	(3): DB04279
ECHA InfoCard	100.159.209
EC Number	(2): 630-924-5
PubChem CID	(2): 77; (3): 36
UNII	(3): 29405QVM5W
CompTox Dashboard (EPA)	DTXSID70863129; (3): DTXSID30274257
- InChI: (2): InChI=1S/C7H12O5/c1-4(2)7(12,6(10)11)3-5(8)9/h4,12H,3H2,1-2H3,(H,8,9)(H,10,11) Key: BITYXLXUCSKTJS-UHFFFAOYSA-N; (3): InChI=1/C7H12O5/c1-3(2)4(6(9)10)5(8)7(11)12/h3-5,8H,1-2H3,(H,9,10)(H,11,12) Key: RNQHMTFBUSSBJQ-UHFFFAOYAR; InChI=1S/C7H12O5/c1-3(2)4(6(9)10)5(8)7(11)12/h3-5,8H,1-2H3,(H,9,10)(H,11,12) Key: RNQHMTFBUSSBJQ-UHFFFAOYSA-N
- SMILES: (2): O=C(O)C(O)(CC(=O)O)C(C)C; (3): O=C(O)C(O)C(C(=O)O)C(C)C

Properties
Chemical formula	C_{7}H_{12}O_{5}
Molar mass	176.168 g·mol^{−1}

Hazards
- GHS labelling
Pictograms	(GHS07: Exclamation mark)
Signal word	Warning
Hazard statements	H315, H319, H335
Precautionary statements	P261, P264, P271, P280, P302+P352, P304+P340, P305+P351+P338, P312, P321, P332+P313, P337+P313, P362, P403+P233, P405, P501
- Except where otherwise noted, data are given for materials in their standard state (at 25 °C [77 °F], 100 kPa). Infobox references

Isopropylmalic acid (isopropylmalate) is an intermediate in the biosynthesis of leucine. It is synthesized from oxoisovalerate by 2-isopropylmalate synthase and converted into isopropyl-3-oxosuccinate by 3-isopropylmalate dehydrogenase. Two isomers are important, the 2- and 3-isopropyl derivatives, and are interconverted by isopropylmalate dehydratase.
