= Aspen trunk rot =

Fungal disease of aspen trees

Aspen trunk rot is a fungal disease that causes stem decay heart rot of living aspen trees. The pathogen that causes this disease is the fungus Phellinus tremulae. Most of the symptoms of this disease are internal, with the only external signs of a diseased aspen being fruiting bodies called conks. A single conk found on an aspen can indicate advanced decay of up to 82% of the tree volume. Internal decayed wood of freshly cut aspens is spongy, yellow/white colored, surrounded by black zones of discoloration, and contains a distinct wintergreen smell. The fungus is spread via airborne spores released from the fruiting body which can infect through dead branches, branch stubs, or wounds in the tree. Although no direct management control is known, harvesting aspen stands that have been damaged or harvesting stands before decay becomes advanced minimizes tree loss. Aspen wood is white, malleable but strong, and heat-tolerant and therefore has many commercial uses including matches, packing paper, lumber, plywood, pulp, and animal beds. Aspen trees diseased with aspen trunk rot decrease the economic value of the lumber.

== Hosts and symptoms ==
Aspen trunk rot affects only living aspen and occasionally a variety of poplar trees. Trembling Aspen Populus tremuloides and Large-tooth Aspen Populus grandidentata are two major hosts of trunk rot. In all infected species, the most obvious sign of rot is a conk on the stem of the tree. A conk is the woody fruiting body of the fungus that forms a triangular shape. Conks are perennial and can survive for up to twenty years. They form about five years after the initial infection. As the decay progresses, rot within the heartwood occurs. The rot appears as a yellowish-white spongy material with black zone lines surrounding it. The main body of rot occurs in the trunk and stem but basal rot can occur as well. The decayed wood has a distinct wintergreen aroma that signifies trunk rot. At the initial stages, the decay may appear discolored but continue to be hard and firm while at later stages, the rot may becomes brownish and the tree may lose structural strength and snap due to a wind gust or other damaging factor.

Aspen trunk rot affects older (50–60 years) trees more than younger trees. Older trees tend to have more wounds and damage. Phellinus tremulae can maintain a resting state for 20 years, so older trees have a greater chance of being infected. Older trees become diseased and die more quickly than younger trees. Stem wounds also increase the opportunities for infection no matter the age of the tree.

In order to diagnose aspen trunk rot, conks are the first sign to look for. Perennial conks with concentric growth rings indicate severe decay because each growth ring signifies a season of disease. It takes many years to build up the concentric rings to indicate severe decay. The conks can appear to have a triangular shape and the lower surface is covered in pores. Knots and stem wounds/scars also indicate decay within the aspen tree while cavities and cracks display the inner decay. Aspen trunk rot is a white rotter because the lignin is broken down within the tree, giving the diseased trunk a white appearance.

== Disease cycle ==
Phellinus tremulae spreads through airborne basidiospores. Sporulation occurs in late winter, early spring, and continues with moist weather in the summer. Spores germinate sexually in fresh wounds only (<1 week old) and conks are produced by the fungus body after 5 years of infection. The conks produce the basidiospores on the underside and setae surround the basidia for protection. Phellinus tremulae has spherical spores with four basidiospores per basidium and generative, skeletal hyphae. Compared to other species in the genus Phellinus, the setae are large and the basidiospores are much smaller. Within the tube layers, mycelium crowd the space. The infection of aspen trunk rot is localized, but decay can spread 2–3 meters above and below the infection site.

The disease cycle of Phellinus tremulae is similar to other fungi but is incomplete. Spores enter new hosts through branch stubs or wounds. Mycelia begin to develop and are activated when exposed to air. The disease spreads through the heartwood and fruiting bodies (conks in advanced decay) develop. Spores are dispersed from the fruiting bodies in all directions.

== Environment ==
Aspen trunk rot is the most common stem decay of aspen in North America. It is especially common in the Rocky Mountains and in Colorado. Aspen trunk rot prevalence varies with age and soil conditions. In regions where aspen grow quickly and mature early, decay also advances rapidly and early in the tree's life. It kills these trees by directly growing into and killing older sapwood. There is a higher percentage of incidence with dry, shallow soils and less incidence with deep soils with adequate moisture.

It is predicted that climate change will impact the prevalence of aspen trunk rot through changing moisture conditions. One effect of climate change is expected increases in temperature. This will result in lower soil moisture levels because of increased transpiration and evaporation. This will cause moisture stress in the trees, making them more vulnerable to aspen trunk rot. Also with less moisture, wind-borne spore dispersal will be impacted. In warmer and drier climates the spread of disease through windborne spores may increase.

== Management ==
There is no direct known control for aspen trunk rot. There are management steps to preserve healthy stands of aspen. As a rule older stands contain a greater amount of decayed heartwood than young stands. Maintaining healthy stands and preventing mechanical and fire damage reduces the likelihood of disease. This is because trees with open wounds, frost cracks or conks are more susceptible to the fungus. This makes it hard to prevent because it can be difficult to prevent wounds on the tree. To reduce the impact that causing wounds can have, it is recommended that development of recreation areas not be in aspen stands because they could become more susceptible to decay and disease following injury caused by humans. It is also recommended that partial cutting to thin and remove defective trees not be used as a management technique because residual stands often deteriorate within 5 years. Instead the goal should be to maintain uniform, well-stocked stands and harvest the whole stand before the decay becomes excessive.

Another possible management strategy would be to use the fungus Phoma etheridgei as an inhibitory agent against Phellinus tremulae. In a study published in the Canadian Journal of Botany the occurrence of black galls on aspen trees produced by Phoma etheridgei resulted in a significant decrease or absence of infection by Phellinus tremulae. Further studies on using the antifungal compounds produced by Phoma etheridgei to control aspen trunk rot may play a key role in controlling Phellinus tremulae.

== Importance ==
Aspen tree wood has many commercial uses due to its soft yet strong and heat-tolerant wood. Some of these uses include matches, building material where low flammability is key, packing paper, plywood, and animal bedding due to lack of irritant phenols in the wood. Because infected trees lose an average of 70% wood volume to the fungus after being infected, Phellinus tremulae causes a lot of economic damage. For example, plywood should be decay-free without any discoloration as this downgrades the product. Phellinus tremulae creates decay and discoloration and therefore results in enormous amounts of waste at the mill. Harvesting aspens with trunk rot is more costly because decay-free trees can be scattered over vast areas in the forest and determining if a tree is infected can be challenging without first cutting down the tree. The high moisture content found in trees infected with Phellinus tremulae increases the shipping costs if dried as it would be with uninfected trees. In order to combat these increased shipping costs, 15% more drying time is required to reduce the moisture content.

Phellinus tremulae compromises the integrity of the tree structure causing a health risk for anyone walking in an aspen forest, as a gust of wind could blow the infected tree down. In fact, an estimated 80% of standing dead aspen biomass will fall within ten years of being infected and this resultant increase in standing, dead tree biomass represents a significant potential source of carbon emissions to the atmosphere.

On the other hand, Phellinus tremulae provides an important habitat for birds and mammals such as woodpeckers, bats, flying and red squirrels, red-naped sapsuckers, boreal owls, and buffleheads. For example, bats rely on the tree cavities formed by heart rot for communal maternity roosting. The older trees with more heart rot may contribute to a stable, warmer microclimate perfect for fetal development and juvenile growth. Additionally, according to a study carried out by the USDA, Phellinus tremulae plays a key role in breeding requirements for the red-naped sapsuckers and buffleheads, nest site selection for woodpeckers, and cavities for habitat for squirrels and owls.
