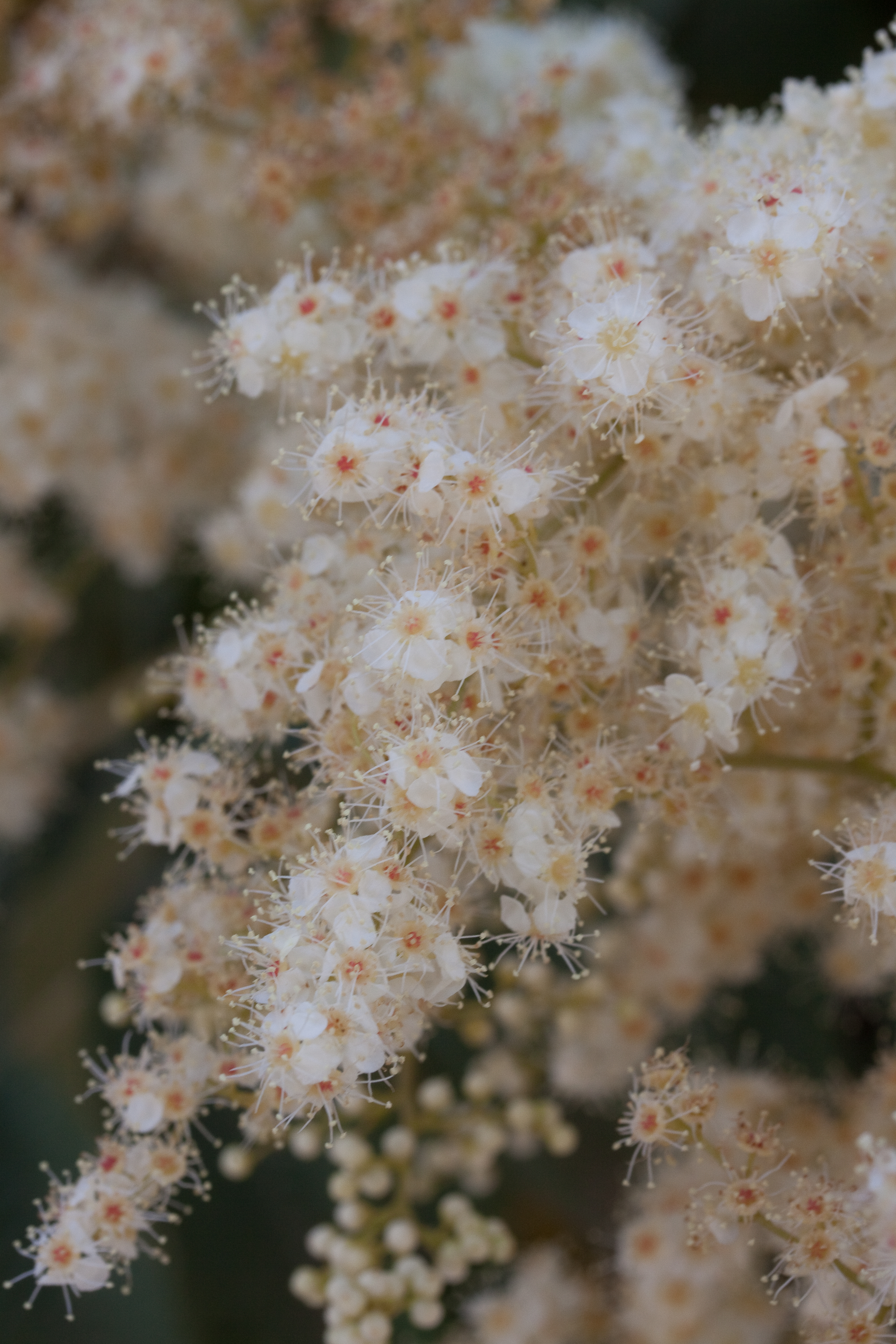
- A flower of Sorbaria kirilowii

Scientific classification
- Kingdom: Plantae
- Clade: Tracheophytes
- Clade: Angiosperms
- Clade: Eudicots
- Clade: Rosids
- Order: Rosales
- Family: Rosaceae
- Genus: Sorbaria
- Species: S. kirilowii

Binomial name
- Sorbaria kirilowii (Regel.) Maxim

= Sorbaria kirilowii =

Species of flowering plant

Sorbaria kirilowii, the giant false spiraea, otherly known as in Chinese: 华北珍珠梅; pinyin: hua bei zhen zhu mei; lit. 'Huabei pearl plum', is a species of seasonal flowering plant in the family Rosaceae.

== Description ==
One shrub can grow around 2-3 metres in height. Branches of the plant do not have trichomes. The plant grows egg-shaped buds in winter, which subsequently germinate into odd-numbered pinnate leaves in early spring, on which around 13-17 leaflets are attached to one petiole. The leaflets are 4-7 centimetre in length, sessile, lanceolate shaped with jagged edges, and. The stipule is of linear lanceolate shape, with slight trichome presence on its edges. The S. kirilowii blossoms between May and July, during which the flowers form a panicle inflorescence, around 7-11 centimeter in diameter. The flowers bud from lanceolate shaped bracts with glandular hair on the edges, sits on a base made up of a 3-4-millimeter-long pedicel and 5 egg-shaped folded sepals. The flower is 6-7 millimeter in diameter, enclosed by 5 white round or egg-shaped petals, which are 2-3 millimeters in both length and width. There are 20-25 stamens within one flower, their filaments are of uneven length, either equal or shorter than the petals, growing on the edge of the flower disk. 5 carpels distribute on the opposite side of the sepals. There are no trichomes on the ovary, and the style is of lateral feature. The ovary develops into a 3-millimeter follicle fruit between August and September.

== Distribution and habitat ==
Sorbaria kirilowii originated from the North China Plains, where wild shrubs flourish in Mount Xiaowutai in Hebei, and other locations in Henan, Shandong, Shanxi, Shaanxi, Gansu, and Qinghai provinces, as well as the Inner Mongolia Autonomous Region. Shrubs usually grows on the adret slope of mountains, typically in mixed bushes. In Beijing and other areas of the Huabei Plains, S. kirilowii are commonly planted in gardens for ornamental purposes.
