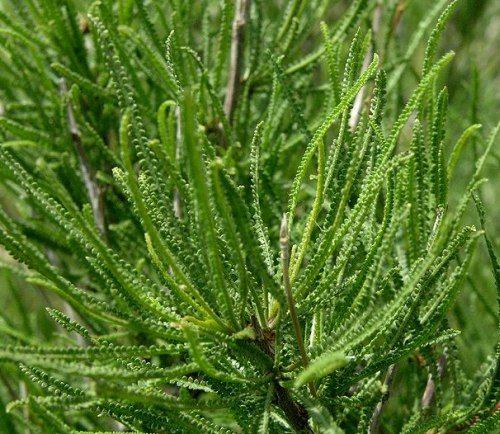
- in the Karatau Mountains, Kazakhstan

Conservation status
- Endangered (IUCN 3.1)

Scientific classification
- Kingdom: Plantae
- Clade: Tracheophytes
- Clade: Angiosperms
- Clade: Eudicots
- Clade: Rosids
- Order: Rosales
- Family: Rosaceae
- Subfamily: Amygdaloideae
- Tribe: Sorbarieae
- Genus: Spiraeanthus (Fisch. & C.A.Mey.) Maxim.
- Species: S. schrenkianus

Binomial name
- Spiraeanthus schrenkianus (Fisch. & C.A.Mey.) Maxim.

= Spiraeanthus =

Family of shrubs

Spiraeanthus is a monotypic genus of shrub in the rose family containing the single species Spiraeanthus schrenkianus. It is native to Kazakhstan and possibly Kyrgyzstan. It is a resident of low parts of Karatau Mountains and gravely Betpak-Dala deserts.

The genus name comes from Latin: spiraea and Greek: ανθος- flower. This is a shrub covered in fernlike foliage made up of fronds of small leaflets. At the ends of the erect branches of this spreading bush are inflorescences of rose spiraealike flowers. It is a relict of the Eocene and the closest relative of Chamaebatiaria.

This species is included on the Regional Red List of Kazakhstan. It is under protection in the Karatau Nature Reserve.
