= 3-Isopropylmalate dehydratase =

Class of enzymes

3-isopropylmalate dehydratase

Identifiers
- EC no.: 4.2.1.33
- CAS no.: 37290-72-5

Databases
- IntEnz: IntEnz view
- BRENDA: BRENDA entry
- ExPASy: NiceZyme view
- KEGG: KEGG entry
- MetaCyc: metabolic pathway
- PRIAM: profile
- PDB structures: RCSB PDB PDBe PDBsum
- Gene Ontology: AmiGO / QuickGO
Search
- PMC: articles
- PubMed: articles
- NCBI: proteins

3-Isopropylmalate dehydratase (EC 4.2.1.33) is an aconitase homologue, which catalyses the isomerisation of 2-isopropylmalate to 3-isopropylmalate, via dehydration, in the biosynthesis of leucine.
