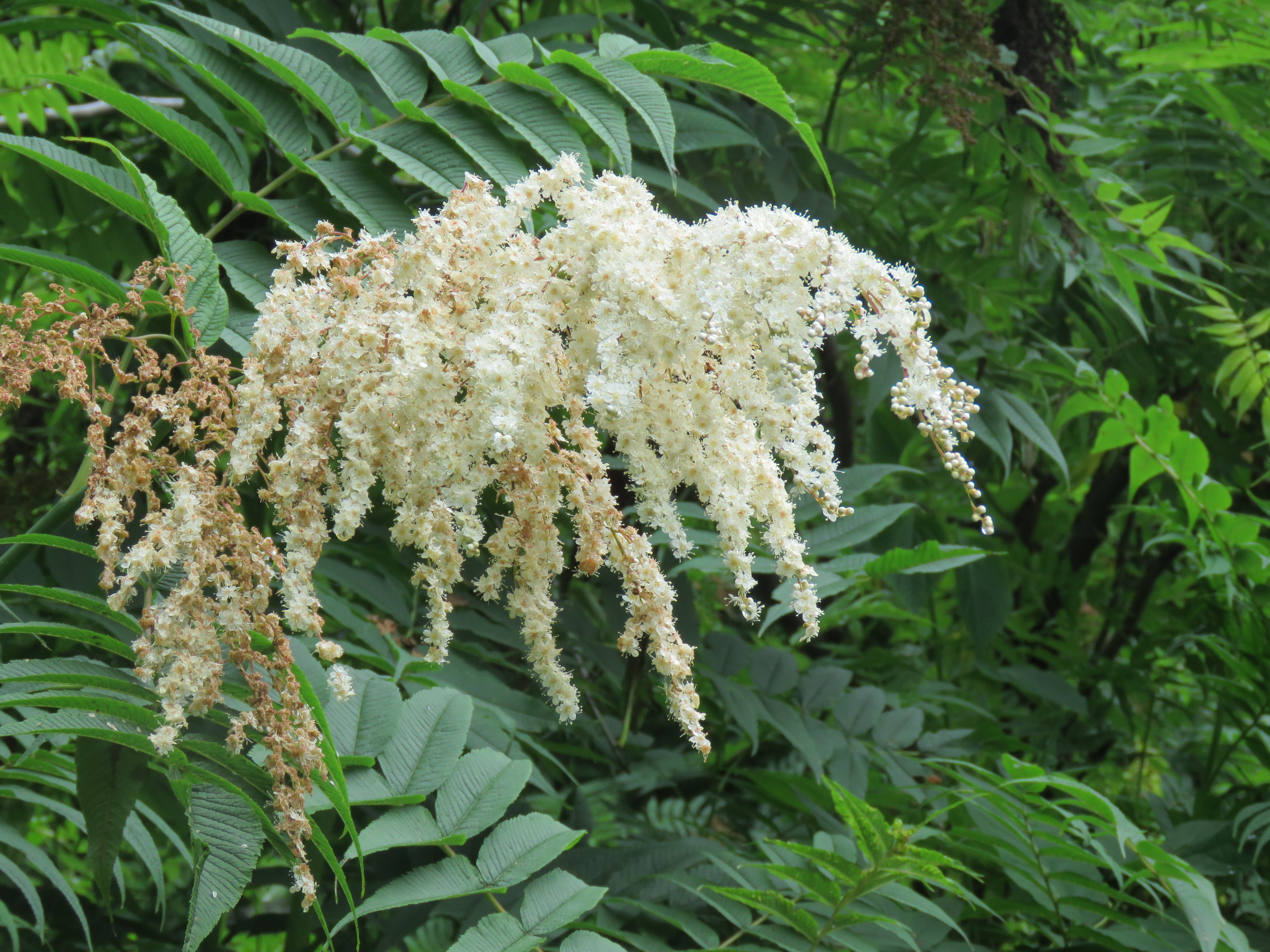
- In bloom at Valley of Flowers National Park, India

Scientific classification
- Kingdom: Plantae
- Clade: Tracheophytes
- Clade: Angiosperms
- Clade: Eudicots
- Clade: Rosids
- Order: Rosales
- Family: Rosaceae
- Genus: Sorbaria
- Species: S. tomentosa

Binomial name
- Sorbaria tomentosa (Lindl.) Rehder (1938)

Synonyms
- List: Basilima lindleyana (Wall. ex Lindl.) Kuntze; Schizonotus aitchisonii (Hemsl.) Skeels; Schizonotus lindleyanus Wall. ex Steud.; Schizonotus tomentosus Lindl. (1840); Sorbaria gilgitensis Zinserl.; Sorbaria lindleyana (Wall. ex Lindl.) Maxim.; Sorbaria olgae Zinserl.; Sorbaria sorbifolia var. lindleyana (Wall. ex Lindl.) K.Koch; Sorbaria tomentosa var. angustifolia (Wenz.) Rahn; Spiraea aitchisonii Hemsl.; Spiraea lindleyana Wall. ex Lindl.; Spiraea sorbifolia var. angustifolia Wenz.

= Sorbaria tomentosa =

Species of flowering plant

Sorbaria tomentosa, the Himalayan sorbaria or Kashmir false spirea, is a species of flowering plant in the family Rosaceae. A shrub with white flowers that can grow up to 6 metres (20 ft) in height. It is native to Afghanistan, Central Asia and the Himalayas, and has been introduced to the South Island of New Zealand. It has gone extinct in Tajikistan. Its putative variety Sorbaria tomentosa var. angustifolia, the narrow-leaved Himalayan sorbaria, has gained the Royal Horticultural Society's Award of Garden Merit.
