= Cyclophellitol =

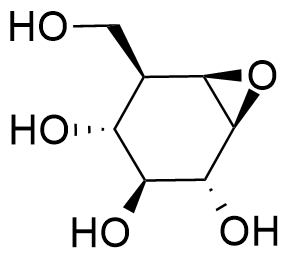

Names
- Preferred IUPAC name (1S,2R,3S,4R,5R,6S)-5-(Hydroxymethyl)-7-oxabicyclo[4.1.0]heptane-2,3,4-triol
- Other names Cyclophellitol

Identifiers
CAS Number	126661-83-4
3D model (JSmol)	Interactive image
ChEMBL	ChEMBL35576
ChemSpider	144010
PubChem CID	164227
CompTox Dashboard (EPA)	DTXSID80925661
- InChI: InChI=1S/C7H12O5/c8-1-2-3(9)4(10)5(11)7-6(2)12-7/h2-11H,1H2/t2-,3-,4+,5-,6-,7+/m1/s1 Key: YQLWKYQDOQEWRD-GEGSFZHJSA-N; InChI=1S/C7H12O5/c8-1-2-3(9)4(10)5(11)7-6(2)12-7/h2-11H,1H2/t2-,3-,4+,5-,6-,7+/m1/s1 Key: YQLWKYQDOQEWRD-GEGSFZHJSA-N
- SMILES: C([C@@H]1[C@H]([C@@H]([C@H]([C@H]2[C@@H]1O2)O)O)O)O

Properties
Chemical formula	C_{7}H_{12}O_{5}
Molar mass	176.168 g·mol^{−1}
- Except where otherwise noted, data are given for materials in their standard state (at 25 °C [77 °F], 100 kPa). (what is ?) Infobox references

Cyclophellitol is a potent irreversible inhibitor of beta-glucosidases. It is a cyclitol mimic of beta-glucose with an epoxide group in place of the acetal group found in glucosides. When recognized, cyclophellitol undergoes an acid-catalyzed ring-opening addition reaction with the catalytic nucleophile of a retaining glycoside hydrolase. The resulting ester linkage cannot be hydrolyzed by the normal catalytic machinery of the enzyme, resulting in irreversible inhibition.

Cyclophellitol was originally isolated from a species of Phellinus mushroom found in Japan. The first total chemical synthesis of cyclophellitol was demonstrated by Tatsuta et al. Synthetic derivatives of cyclophellitol have been used for the detection of enzymes such as glucocerebrosidase, deficiency of which results in Gaucher's disease.
