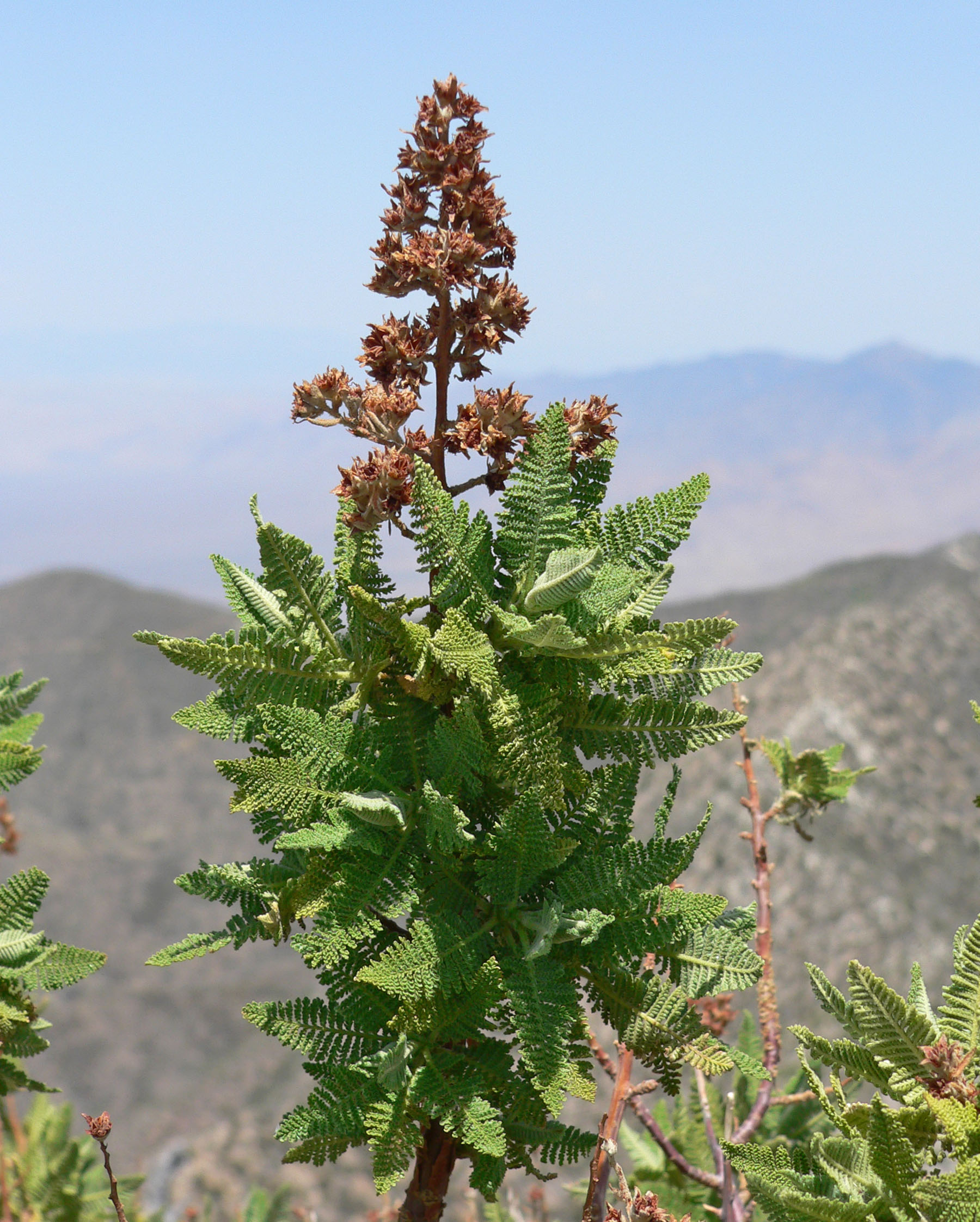
- At summit of Virgin Peak, southern Nevada

Scientific classification
- Kingdom: Plantae
- Clade: Tracheophytes
- Clade: Angiosperms
- Clade: Eudicots
- Clade: Rosids
- Order: Rosales
- Family: Rosaceae
- Subfamily: Amygdaloideae
- Tribe: Sorbarieae
- Genus: Chamaebatiaria (Porter ex W.H.Brewer & S.Watson) Maxim.
- Species: C. millefolium

Binomial name
- Chamaebatiaria millefolium (Torr.) Maxim.

= Chamaebatiaria =

Genus of flowering plants

Chamaebatiaria is a monotypic genus of aromatic shrub in the rose family containing the single species Chamaebatiaria millefolium, which is known by the common names fern bush and desert sweet. Its genus name comes from its physical resemblance to the mountain miseries of genus Chamaebatia, which are not closely related. This is a hairy, sticky plant covered in fernlike foliage made up of fronds of small leaflets. At the ends of the erect branches of this spreading bush are inflorescences of white roselike flowers. This shrub is a resident of scrub, woodland, and forests in western North America. It is the closest relative of Spiraeanthus.
