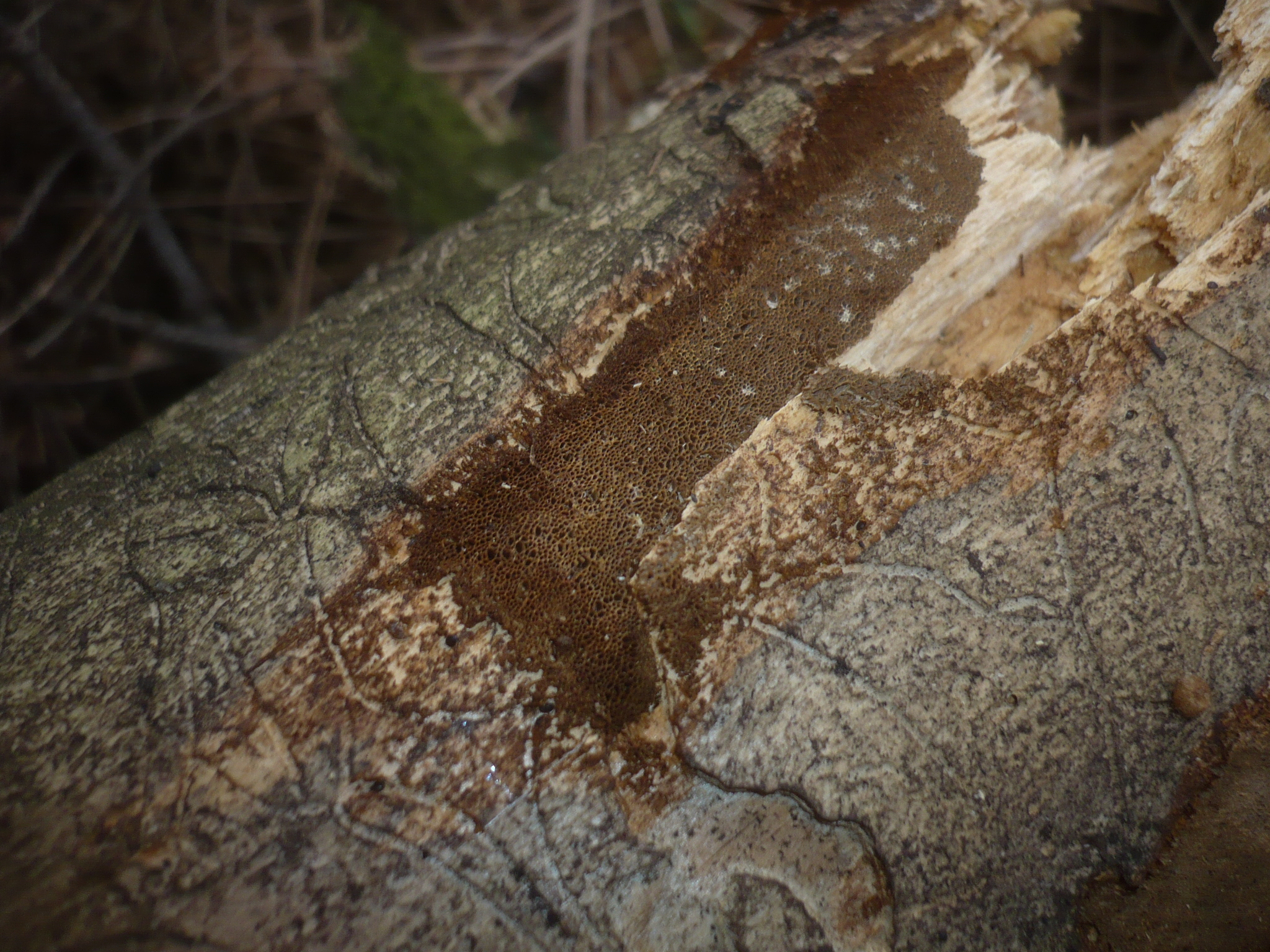

Scientific classification
- Domain: Eukaryota
- Kingdom: Fungi
- Division: Basidiomycota
- Class: Agaricomycetes
- Order: Hymenochaetales
- Family: Hymenochaetaceae
- Genus: Phellinus
- Species: P. viticola

Binomial name
- Phellinus viticola (Schweinitz) Donk, 1966

= Phellinus viticola =

Species of fungus

Phellinus viticola is a species of fungus belonging to the family Hymenochaetaceae.

Synonym:

- Polyporus viticola Schwein, 1828 (= basionym)
