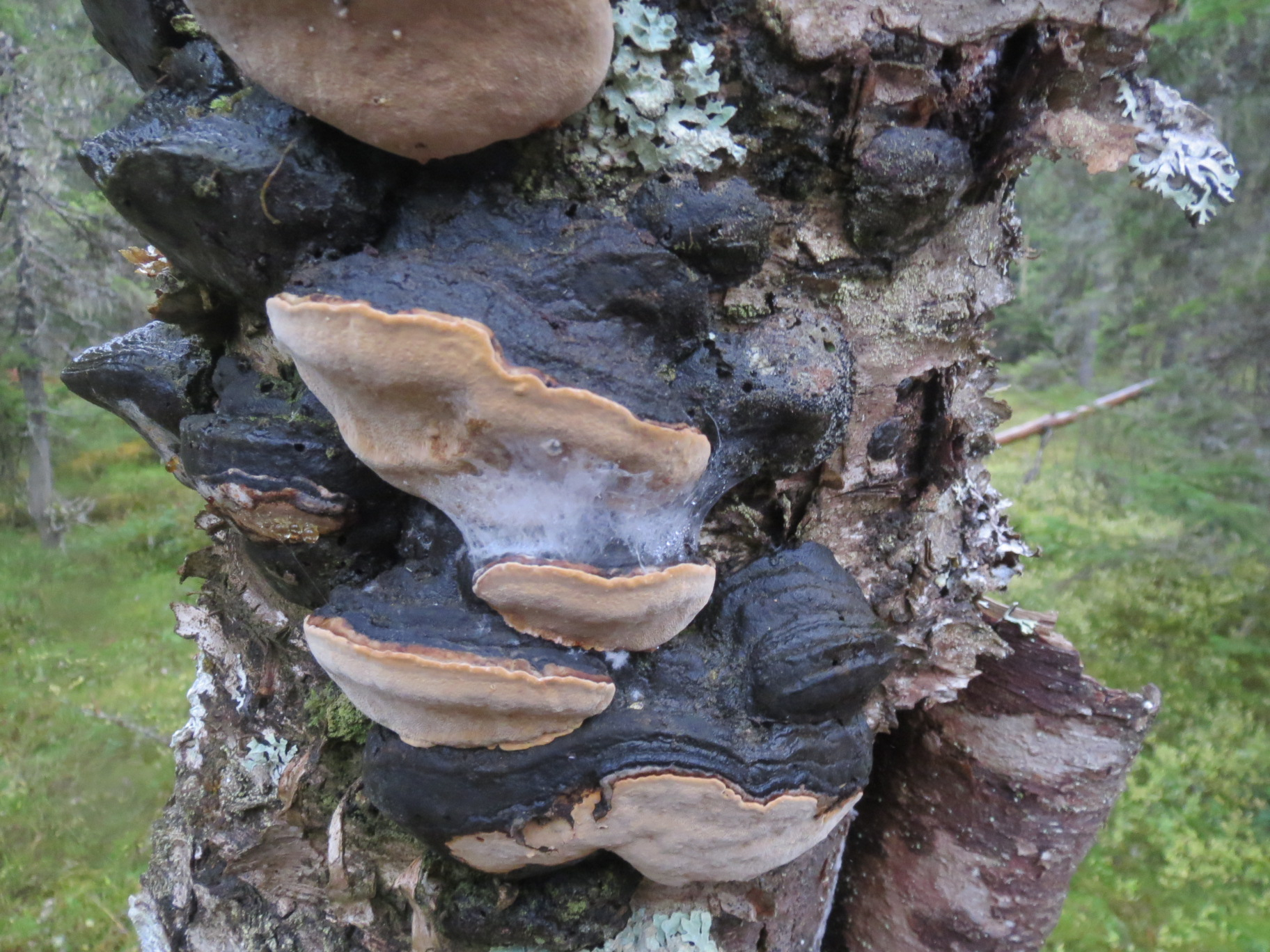

Scientific classification
- Domain: Eukaryota
- Kingdom: Fungi
- Division: Basidiomycota
- Class: Agaricomycetes
- Order: Hymenochaetales
- Family: Hymenochaetaceae
- Genus: Phellinus
- Species: P. lundellii

Binomial name
- Phellinus lundellii Niemelä (1972)

= Phellinus lundellii =

Species of fungus

Phellinus lundellii is a species of fungus belonging to the family Hymenochaetaceae. It is found in Eurasia and North America.
