= 3-Isopropylmalate dehydrogenase =

InterPro Family

Identifiers
- EC no.: 1.1.1.85
- CAS no.: 9030-97-1

Databases
- IntEnz: IntEnz view
- BRENDA: BRENDA entry
- ExPASy: NiceZyme view
- KEGG: KEGG entry
- MetaCyc: metabolic pathway
- PRIAM: profile
- PDB structures: RCSB PDB PDBe PDBsum
- Gene Ontology: AmiGO / QuickGO
Search
- PMC: articles
- PubMed: articles
- NCBI: proteins

3-Isopropylmalate dehydrogenase (EC 1.1.1.85) is an enzyme that is a part of the isopropylmalate dehydrogenase family, which catalyzes the overall chemical reaction:

(2R,3S)-3-isopropylmalic acid
+ NAD^{+}
H^{+}
H^{+}
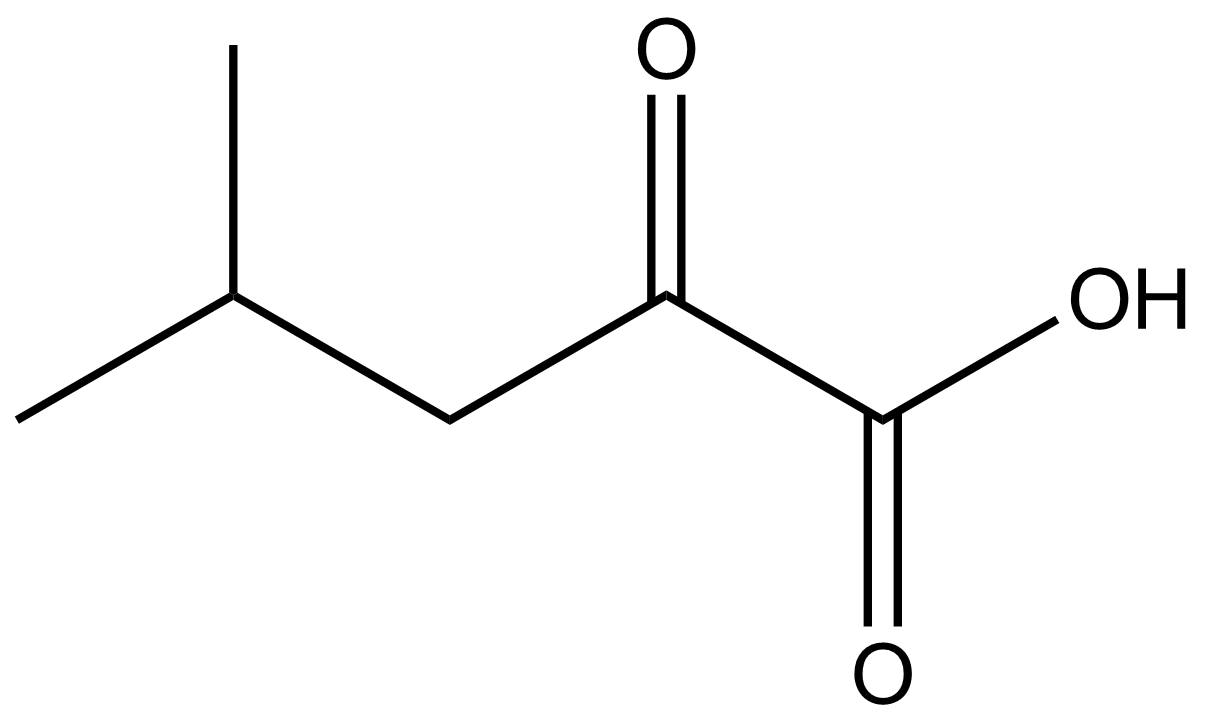
α-ketoisocaproic acid
+ CO_{2} + NADH

The first step is an oxidation reaction in which the cofactor, oxidised nicotinamide adenine dinucleotide (NAD^{+}), converts the hydroxy group of the malic acid derivative into the corresponding keto group. This spontaneously decarboxylates to give the observed product.
