= Tartrate dehydrogenase =

tartrate dehydrogenase
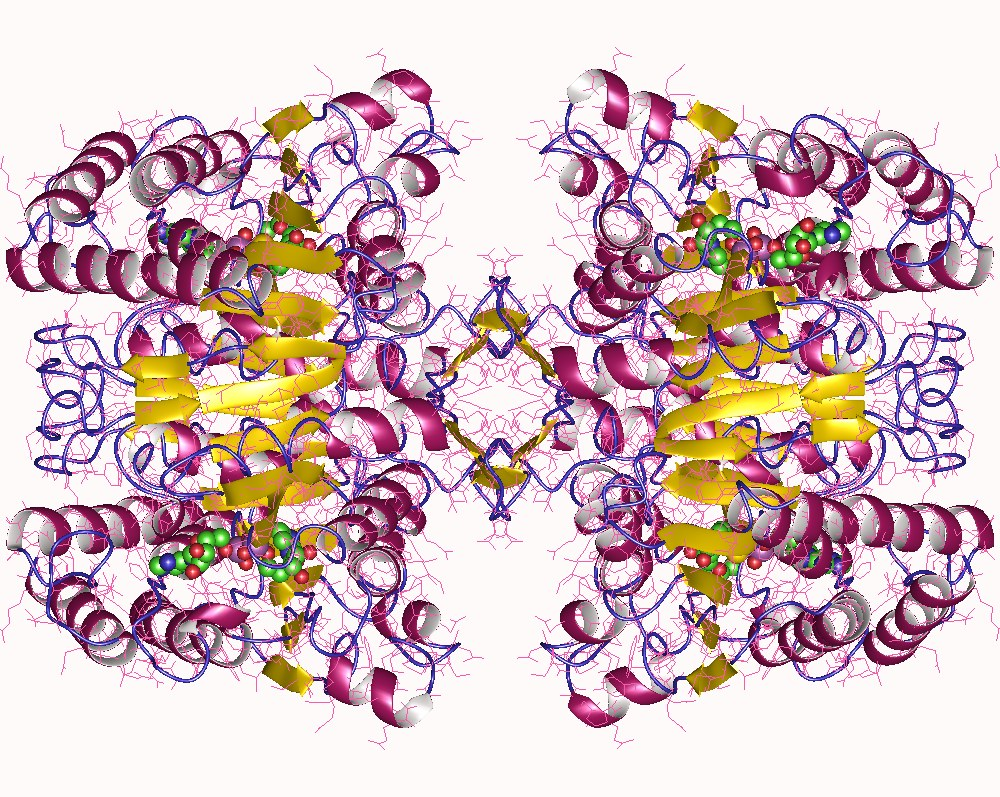
- Tartrate dehydrogenase tetramer, Pseudomonas putida

Identifiers
- EC no.: 1.1.1.93
- CAS no.: 37250-29-6

Databases
- IntEnz: IntEnz view
- BRENDA: BRENDA entry
- ExPASy: NiceZyme view
- KEGG: KEGG entry
- MetaCyc: metabolic pathway
- PRIAM: profile
- PDB structures: RCSB PDB PDBe PDBsum
- Gene Ontology: AmiGO / QuickGO
Search
- PMC: articles
- PubMed: articles
- NCBI: proteins

In enzymology, tartrate dehydrogenase (EC 1.1.1.93) is an enzyme that catalyzes the chemical reaction

meso-tartaric acid
+ NAD^{+}
H^{+}
H^{+}
2-hydroxy-3-oxosuccinic acid
+ NADH

The two substrates of this enzyme are meso-tartaric acid and oxidised nicotinamide adenine dinucleotide (NAD^{+}). Its products are 2-hydroxy-3-oxosuccinic acid, reduced NADH, and a proton. The enzyme can also act on the stereoisomer (+)-tartaric acid, giving the same product.

Naturally occurring L-(+)-tartaric acid

This enzyme belongs to the family of oxidoreductases, specifically those acting on the CH-OH group of donor with NAD^{+} or NADP^{+} as acceptor. The systematic name of this enzyme class is tartrate:NAD^{+} oxidoreductase. This enzyme is also called mesotartrate dehydrogenase. This enzyme participates in glyoxylate and dicarboxylate metabolism. It employs one cofactor, manganese.
