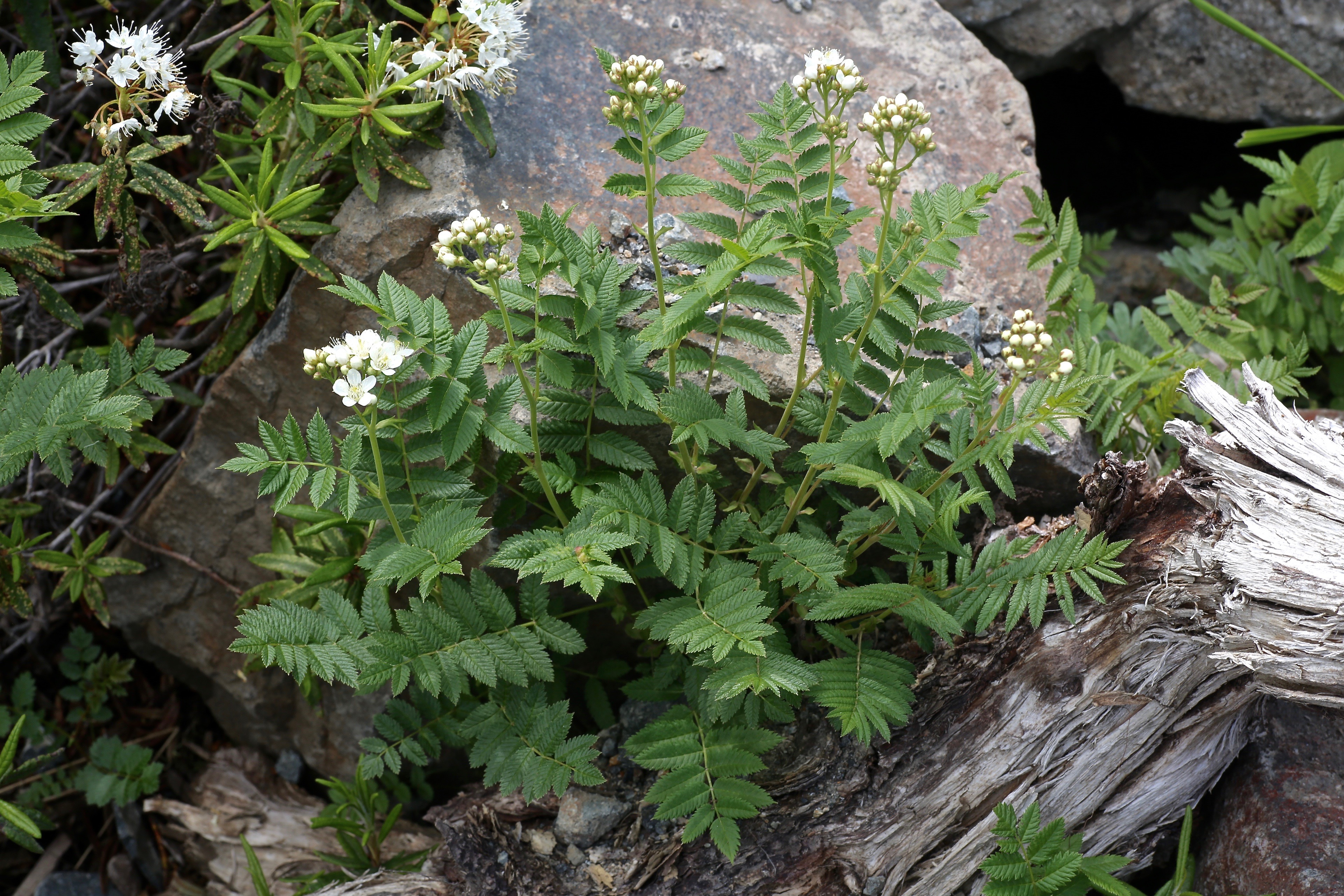
- Habit
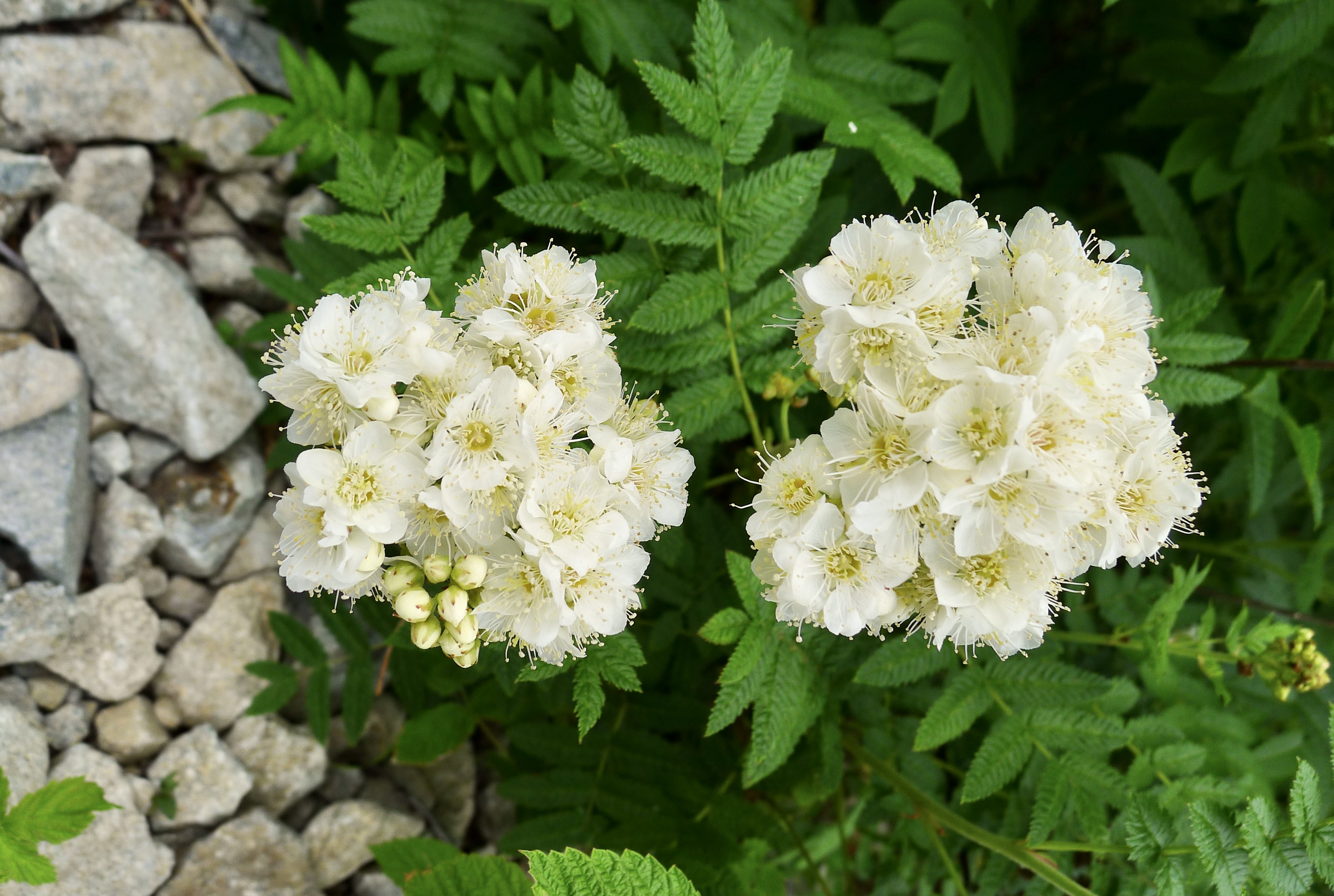
- Inflorescences

Scientific classification
- Kingdom: Plantae
- Clade: Embryophytes
- Clade: Tracheophytes
- Clade: Spermatophytes
- Clade: Angiosperms
- Clade: Eudicots
- Clade: Rosids
- Order: Rosales
- Family: Rosaceae
- Genus: Sorbaria
- Species: S. grandiflora

Binomial name
- Sorbaria grandiflora (Sweet) Maxim.

Synonyms
- List: Basilima alpina Koehne; Basilima grandiflora (Sweet) Kuntze; Basilima pygmaea Raf.; Sorbaria alpina Dippel; Sorbaria grandiflora subsp. komaroviana Nedol.; Sorbaria grandiflora subsp. rhoifolia (Kom.) Jakubov; Sorbaria pallasii Pojark.; Sorbaria pallasii subsp. rhoifolia (Kom.) Vorosch.; Sorbaria rhoifolia Kom.; Spiraea grandiflora Sweet; Spiraea pallasii G.Don; Spiraea sorbifolia var. pusilla Pall.

= Sorbaria grandiflora =

Species of flowering plant

Sorbaria grandiflora is a species of flowering plant in the family Rosaceae, native to eastern Siberia and the Russian Far East. A perennial shrub reaching 3 ft (1 m), it is hardy in USDA zones 5 through 7, and is considered useful in the garden as it flowers in July when other shrubs are not in bloom. Care must be taken lest it become invasive.
