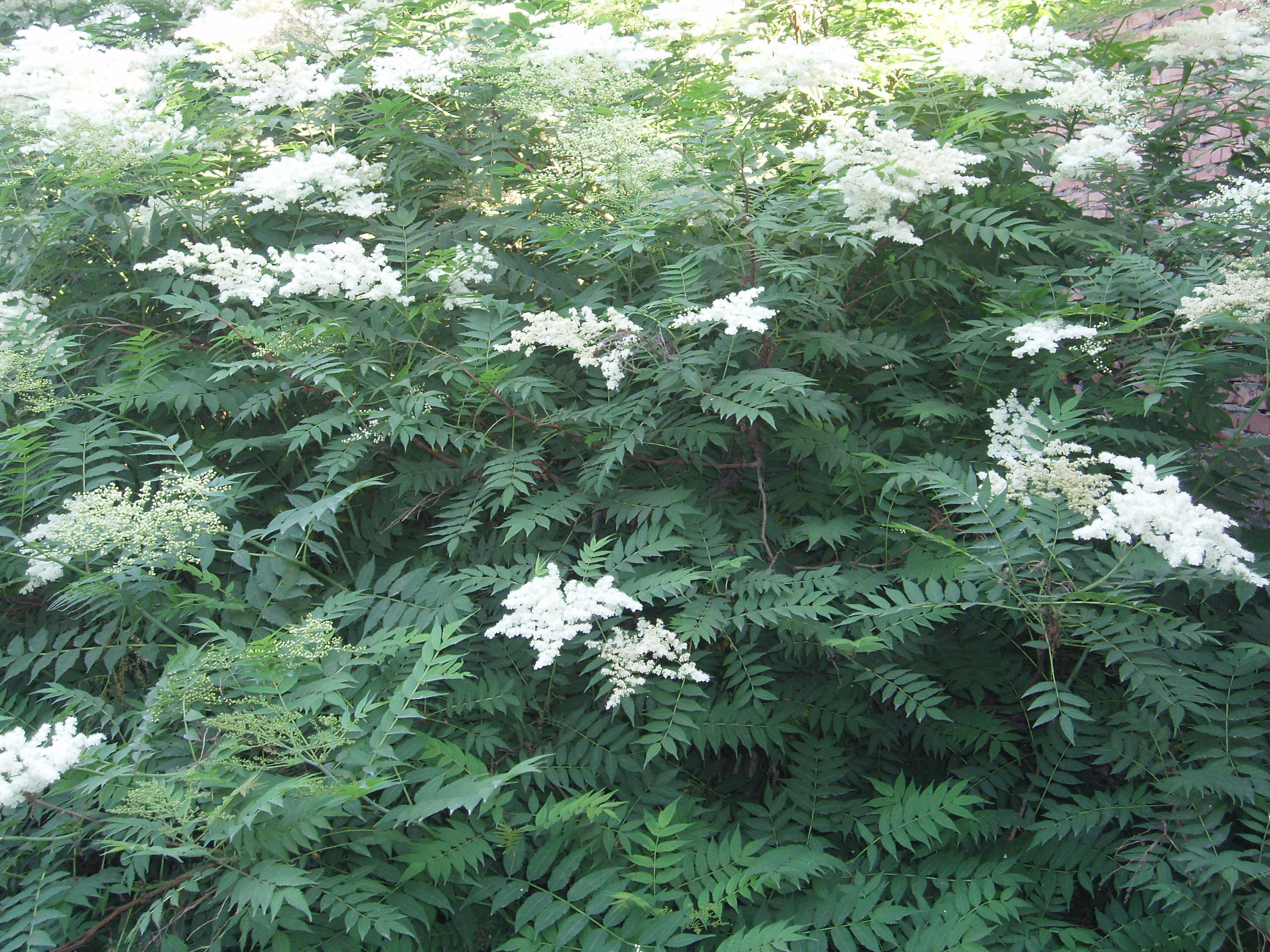

Scientific classification
- Kingdom: Plantae
- Clade: Tracheophytes
- Clade: Angiosperms
- Clade: Eudicots
- Clade: Rosids
- Order: Rosales
- Family: Rosaceae
- Genus: Sorbaria
- Species: S. sorbifolia

Binomial name
- Sorbaria sorbifolia (L.) A.Braun

Synonyms
- Basilima sorbifolia (L.) Raf. Schizonotus sorbifolius (L.) Lindl. ex Steud. Sorbaria sorbifolia var. glabra Maxim. Sorbaria sorbifolia var. stellipila Maxim. Sorbaria stellipila (Maxim.) C.K.Schneid. Spiraea pinnata Moench; Spiraea sorbifolia L.

= Sorbaria sorbifolia =

Species of flowering plant

Sorbaria sorbifolia, the false spiraea, is a species of flowering plant in the family Rosaceae. The common name is also spelled false spirea. Other common names include false goat's beard, sorb-leaved schizonotus, Ural false spirea, and in Chinese: 珍珠梅; pinyin: zhen zhu mei; lit. 'pearl plum'.

A deciduous shrub reaching 1–1.5 m (3.3–4.9 ft), it bears compound, alternate, toothed leaflets which have been compared to ferns or sumac. The Latin specific epithet sorbifolia means "with leaves like Sorbus (mountain ash)". In good light the leaves may redden in the autumn before falling. The flowers, appearing in July and August, are white and showy, clustered at the end of the branches.

Sorbaria sorbifolia grows naturally in temperate areas of Asia including Siberia, the Far East of Russia, northern China, Japan and Korea. It has been introduced as a garden ornamental elsewhere into Europe and North America. The compact cultivar 'Sem', with multicoloured leaves in shades of yellow, bronze and red, has more erect panicles of flowers than the species. It has gained the Royal Horticultural Society's Award of Garden Merit.

It is classified as an invasive alien species in Finland.
