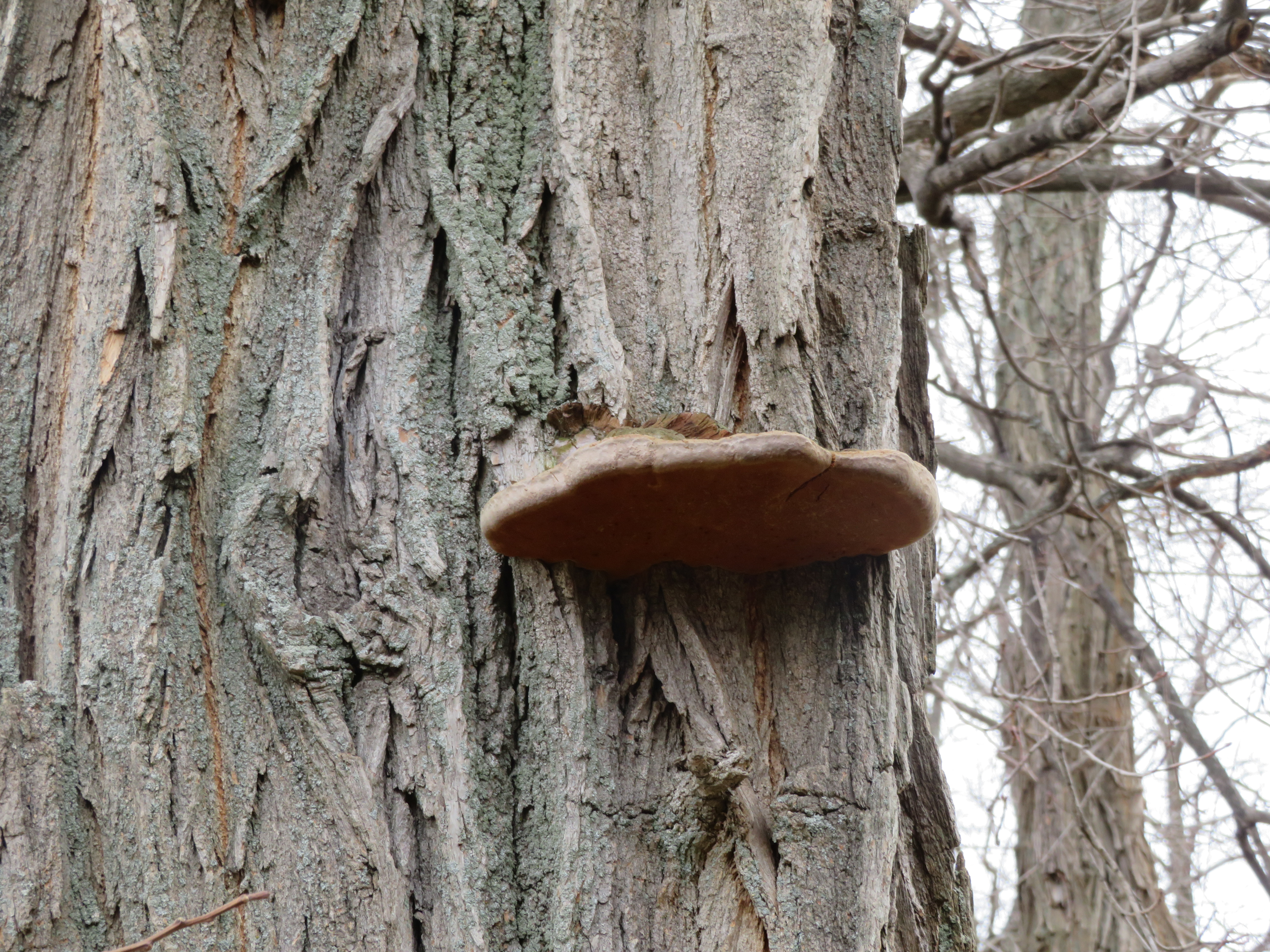
- Fulvifomes robiniae infecting black locust

Scientific classification
- Domain: Eukaryota
- Kingdom: Fungi
- Division: Basidiomycota
- Class: Agaricomycetes
- Order: Hymenochaetales
- Family: Hymenochaetaceae
- Genus: Fulvifomes
- Species: F. robiniae

Binomial name
- Fulvifomes robiniae (Murrill, 1903) Murrill (1914)

Synonyms
- Synonymy: Pyropolyporus robiniae Murrill, 1903; Fomes robiniae Murrill, 1905; Polyporus robiniae Murrill, 1908; Phellinus robiniae Ames, 1913; Scindalma robiniae Teixera, 1986; Fomitiporella robiniae Teixera, 1992

= Fulvifomes robiniae =

Species of fungus, infests black locusts

Fulvifomes robiniae Mycological characteristics
- Pores on hymenium
- Cap is offset
- Hymenium attachment is not applicable
- Lacks a stipe
- Spore print is yellow-brown
- Ecology is parasitic
- Edibility is inedible

Fulvifomes robiniae, commonly called the cracked cap polypore, is a fungus of the family of Hymenochaetaceae. The fungus primarily infests black locusts, aided by openings caused by Megacyllene robiniae infestation, but also grows on various other trees such as Carya, oak, and Acacia. Cracked cap polypore is sympatric with most of its hosts. It has a brown spore print, leaving brown streaks on the tree below the fungus.

The species was formerly considered part of the genus Phellinus, but was moved to the genus Fulvifomes when that genus was resurrected based on morphological and molecular phylogenetic evidence.
