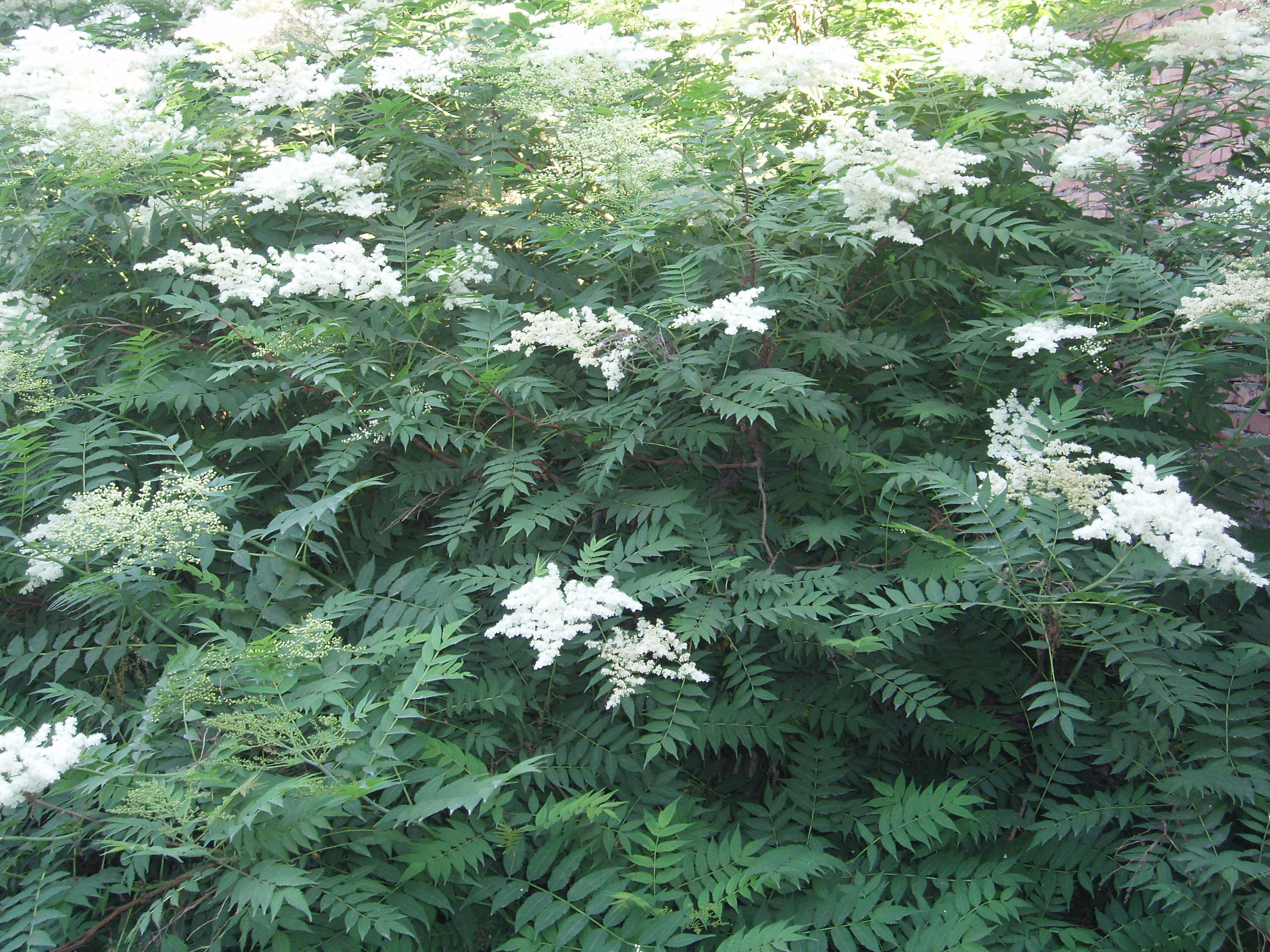
- False spiraea (Sorbaria sorbifolia) in flower

Scientific classification
- Kingdom: Plantae
- Clade: Embryophytes
- Clade: Tracheophytes
- Clade: Spermatophytes
- Clade: Angiosperms
- Clade: Eudicots
- Clade: Rosids
- Order: Rosales
- Family: Rosaceae
- Subfamily: Amygdaloideae
- Tribe: Sorbarieae
- Genus: Sorbaria (Ser.) A.Braun

= Sorbaria =

Genus of flowering plants

Sorbaria is a genus of around four species of flowering plants belonging to the family Rosaceae.

== Species ==
Accepted species include:

- Sorbaria grandiflora (Sweet) Maxim.
- Sorbaria kirilowii (Regel) Maxim.
- Sorbaria sorbifolia (L.) A.Braun – false spiraea
- Sorbaria tomentosa (Lindl.) Rehder – AGM
