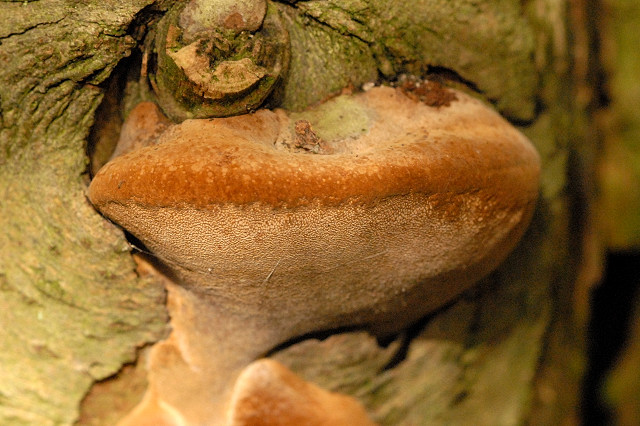

Scientific classification
- Domain: Eukaryota
- Kingdom: Fungi
- Division: Basidiomycota
- Class: Agaricomycetes
- Order: Hymenochaetales
- Family: Hymenochaetaceae
- Genus: Phellinus
- Species: P. pomaceus

Binomial name
- Phellinus pomaceus (Pers.) Maire, (1933)

Synonyms
- Boletus fomentarius var. pomaceus (Pers.) Pers., (1801); Boletus igniarius sensu Bolton (2005); Boletus pomaceus Pers., (1800); Boletus scutiformis Tratt., (1804); Boletus tuberculosus Baumg., (1790); Boudiera scalaria Lázaro Ibiza, (1916); Fomes fuscus (Lázaro Ibiza) Sacc. & Trotter, (1925); Fomes pomaceus (Pers.) Lloyd, (1910); Fomes pomaceus var. fulvus Rea, (1922); Fomes prunicola Lázaro Ibiza, (1916); Fomes prunicola (Lázaro Ibiza) Sacc. & Trotter, (1925); Fomes prunorum (Lázaro Ibiza) Sacc. & Trotter, (1925); Fomes scalarius (Lázaro Ibiza) Sacc. & Trotter, (1925); Hemidiscia prunorum Lázaro Ibiza, (1916); Ochroporus pomaceus (Pers.) Donk, (1933); Ochroporus tuberculosus (Baumg.) Fiasson & Niemelä, (1984); Phellinus igniarius subsp. pomaceus (Pers.) Quél., (1886); Phellinus tuberculosus (Baumg.) Niemelä, (1982); Polyporus corni Velen., (1925); Polyporus fulvus R. Hartig; Polyporus igniarius var. effusoreflexus Velen., (1922); Polyporus pomaceus (Pers.) Pers., (1825); Polyporus sorbi Velen., (1922); Pseudofomes prunicola Lázaro Ibiza, (1916); Scalaria fusca Lázaro Ibiza, (1916)

= Phellinus pomaceus =

Species of fungus

Phellinus pomaceus is a plant pathogen particularly common on Prunus species. It is not aggressively pathogenic but can cause considerable decay in trees suffering from other stress factors. P. pomaceus is found in Europe as well as areas of Asia, South America and Africa. This species has historically been used for medicinal purposes and is currently being researched for its chemical and biological properties. This is a very long-lived conk, bearing as many as eighty annual growth rings.
