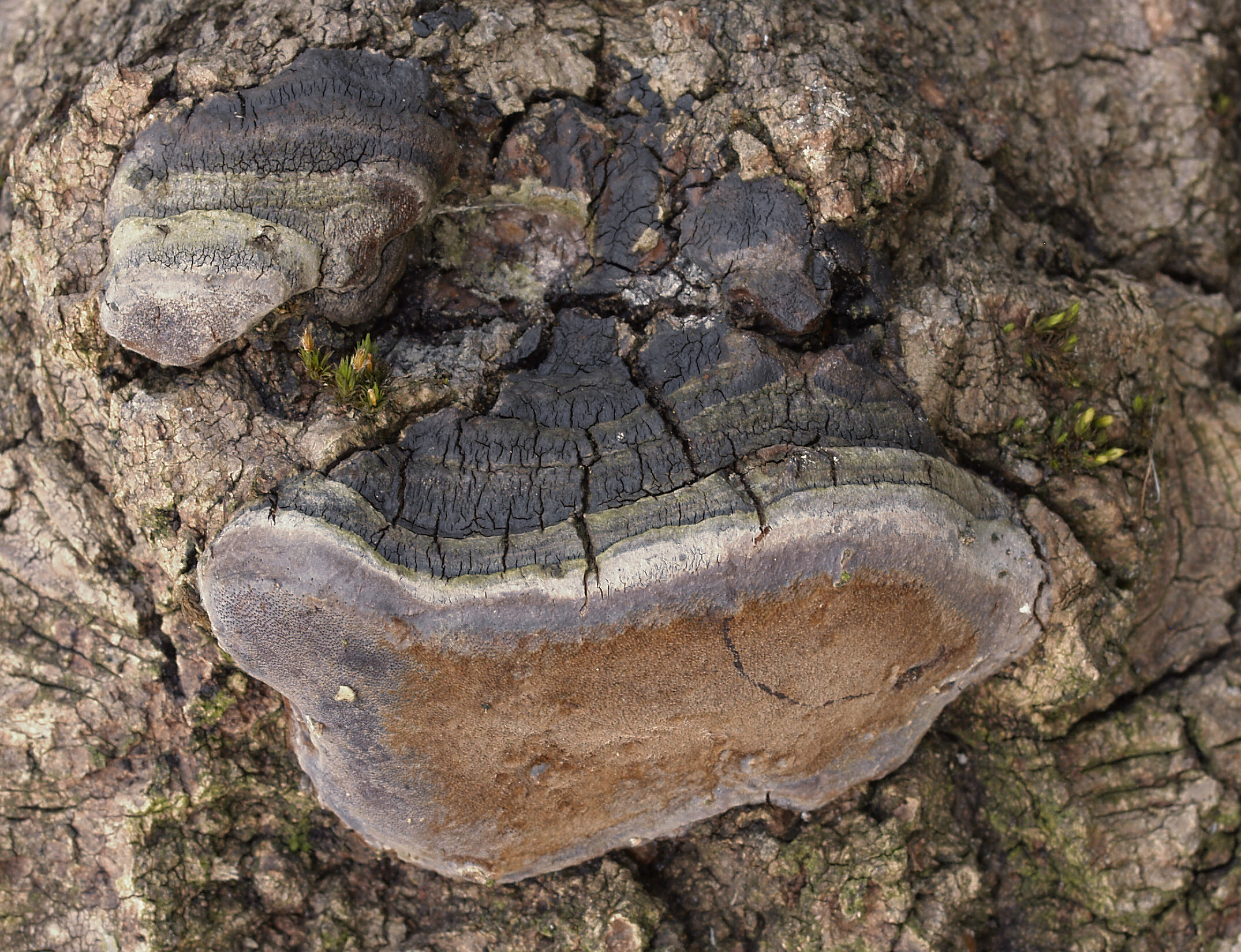

Scientific classification
- Domain: Eukaryota
- Kingdom: Fungi
- Division: Basidiomycota
- Class: Agaricomycetes
- Order: Hymenochaetales
- Family: Hymenochaetaceae
- Genus: Phellinus
- Species: P. tremulae

Binomial name
- Phellinus tremulae (Bondartsev) Bondartsev & P.N.Borisov (1953)

Synonyms
- Fomes igniarius f. tremulae Bondartsev (1935); Fomes tremulae (Bondartsev) P.N.Borisov (1940); Ochroporus tremulae (Bondartsev) Fiasson & Niemelä (1984)

= Phellinus tremulae =

Species of fungus

Phellinus tremulae, the aspen bracket, is a species of polypore fungus in the family Hymenochaetaceae that grows on Populus tremula and on trembling aspen in Canada. The species was first described as Fomes igniarius f. tremulae by Appollinaris Semenovich Bondartsev in 1935. It causes the disease Aspen trunk rot.
