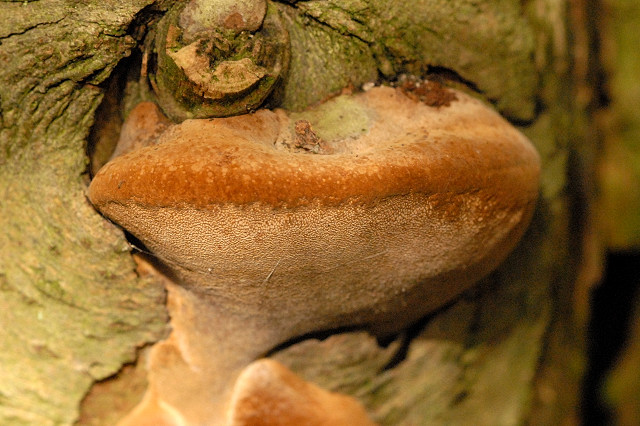
- Phellinus pomaceus

Scientific classification
- Kingdom: Fungi
- Division: Basidiomycota
- Class: Agaricomycetes
- Order: Hymenochaetales
- Family: Hymenochaetaceae
- Genus: Phellinus; Quél. (1886)

Type species
- Phellinus igniarius (L.) Quél. (1886)

Species
- See List of Phellinus species

= Phellinus =

Genus of fungi

Phellinus is a genus of fungi in the family Hymenochaetaceae. Many species cause white rot. Fruit bodies, which are found growing on wood, are resupinate, sessile, and perennial. The flesh is tough and woody or cork-like, and brown in color. Clamp connections are absent, and the skeletal hyphae are yellowish-brown.

The name Phellinus means cork.

The species Phellinus ellipsoideus (previously Fomitiporia ellipsoidea) produced the largest ever fungal fruit body.

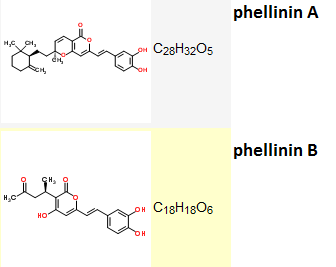
Phellinin A-B.png

Phellinus species produce a number of natural chemicals which are of interest to science. These include the natural phenol hispidin, bio-active styrylpyrones called phelligridins, and bio-active isolates called phellinins.

== Uses ==
In Australia, Indigenous Australians have used Phellinus fruit bodies medicinally. The smoke from burning fruit bodies was inhaled by those with sore throats. Scrapings from slightly charred fruit bodies were drunk with water to treat coughing, sore throats, "bad chests", fevers and diarrhoea. There is some uncertainty about which species of Phellinus were used.

== Species ==
As of October 2025, Catalogue of Life lists 94 species in the genus Phellinus. Selected species include:

- Phellinus ellipsoideus
- Phellinus igniarius
- Phellinus lundellii
- Phellinus pomaceus
- Phellinus tremulae
- Phellinus viticola

The widespread species Fulvifomes robiniae was formerly considered within Phellinus, but was moved to the genus Fulvifomes when that genus was resurrected based on morphological and molecular phylogenetic evidence.
