= Largest fungal fruit bodies =

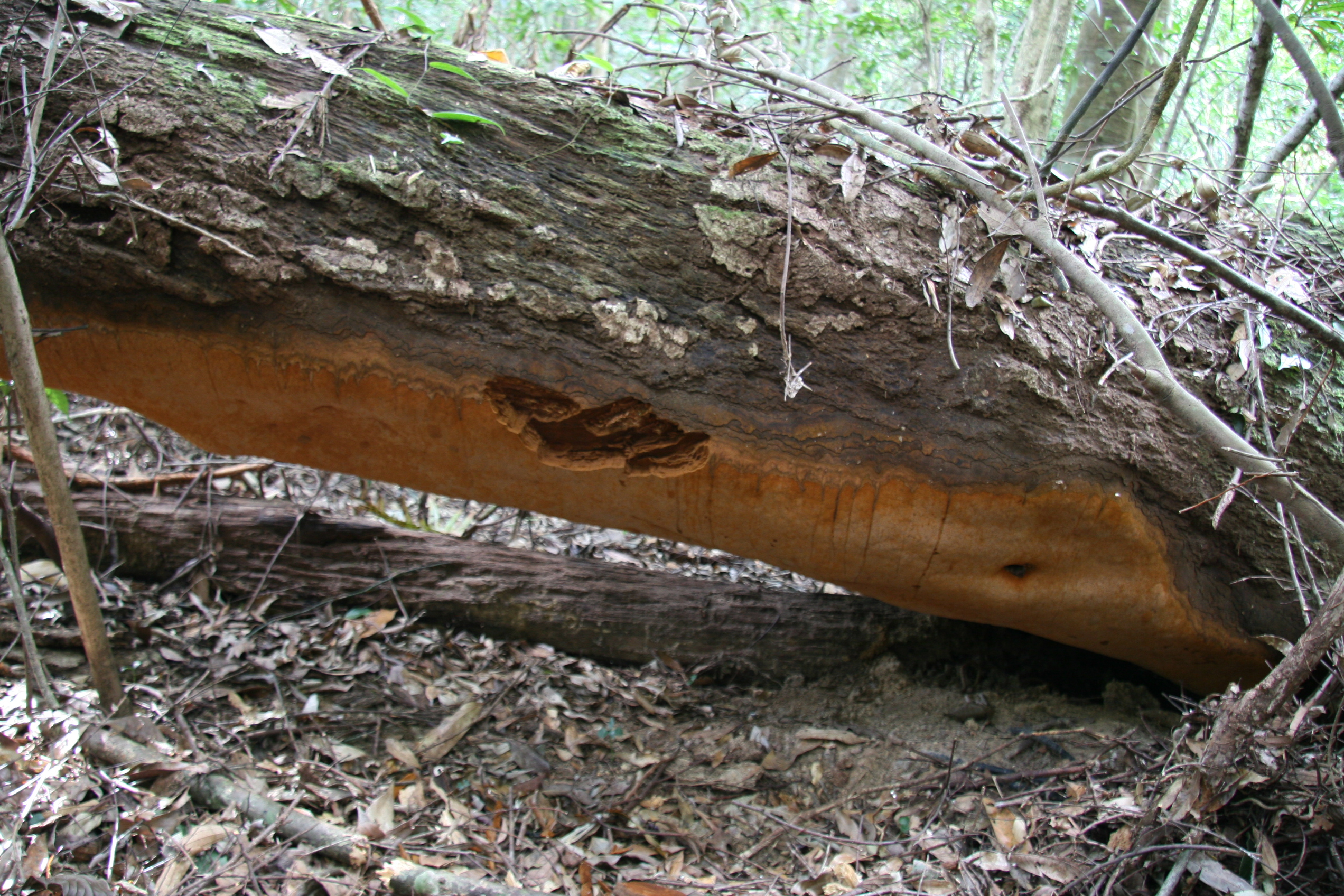
The fruit body of the Chinese fungus Phellinus ellipsoideus, discovered in 2008, is the largest recorded fungal fruit body in the world.

The largest mushrooms and conks are the largest known individual fruit bodies. These are known as sporocarps, or, more specifically, basidiocarps and ascocarps for the Basidiomycota and Ascomycota respectively. These fruit bodies have a wide variety of morphologies, ranging from the typical mushroom shape, to brackets (conks), puffballs, cup fungi, stinkhorns, crusts and corals. Many species of fungi, including yeasts, moulds and the fungal component of lichens, do not form fruit bodies in this sense, but can form visible presences such as cankers. Individual fruit bodies need not be individual biological organisms, and extremely large single organisms can be made up of a great many fruit bodies connected by networks of mycelia (including the "humongous fungus", a single specimen of Armillaria solidipes) can cover a very large area.

The largest identified fungal fruit body in the world is a specimen of Phellinus ellipsoideus (formerly Fomitiporia ellipsoidea). The species was discovered in 2008 by Bao-Kai Cui and Yu-Cheng Dai in Fujian Province, China. In 2011, the two of them published details of extremely large fruit body of the species that they had found on Hainan Island. The specimen, which was 20 years old, was estimated to weigh between 400 and 500 kilograms (880 and 1,100 lb). This was markedly larger than the previously largest recorded fungal fruit body, a specimen of Rigidoporus ulmarius found in the United Kingdom that had a circumference of 425 cm (167 in).

== Polypores ==
Polypores are fungi forming fruiting bodies that are often thick and hard on the sides of trees, without a stalk. Many of them form a roughly semicircular projecting bracket; others form a thick crust.

Species and family	Distribution	Width	Thickness	Weight	Comments
Phellinus ellipsoideus (formerly Fomitiporia ellipsoidea), Polyporaceae	Southern China	10.85 m (35.6 ft) long by 84 cm (33 in) broad by 5 cm (2.0 in) thick.		Between 401.9 and 515.7 kg (886 and 1,137 lb).	
Rigidoporus ulmarius (formerly Polyporus actinobolus), Polyporaceae	Western and Southern Europe.	1.7 m (5 ft 7 in) wide by 1.47 m (4 ft 10 in) broad by 21 cm (8.3 in) top to bottom.	21 cm (8.3 in) top to bottom.	284.5 kg (627 lb).	
Phellinus pachyphloeus (or Inonotus pachyphloeus), Polyporaceae	The Indian subcontinent.	4 ft 11.5 in (151.1 cm) in width, 4 ft 8 in (142 cm) in breadth and 22.5 inches (57 cm) top to bottom.	57 cm (22 in) top to bottom.	Weight not stated.	
Bridgeoporus nobilissimus, Polyporaceae	western Washington state, western Oregon and northwestern California.	1.42 m (4 ft 8 in) wide by 94 cm (37 in) broad 91.5 cm (36.0 in) top to bottom.	91.5 cm (36.0 in) top to bottom.	140 kg (300 lb).	
Serpula lacrymans, Polyporaceae	Originally native to Himalayan foothills, but now of pan-temperate distribution.	3.66 m (12.0 ft) wide by 4.57 m (15.0 ft) top to bottom. Thickness not stated.	4.57 m (15.0 ft) top to bottom.	Weight not stated.	Found growing from an Oak beam in a tunnel in Doncaster, Yorkshire, England in 1858.
Inonotus obliquus, Polyporaceae	Much of the Northern Hemisphere.	Circumference of 42 inches (110 centimeters).		78.2 pounds (35.5 kilograms).	Approximately 15 additional pounds (6.8 kilograms) was left on the host tree for regrowth, bringing the total weight to around 93 pounds (42 kg).
Ganoderma lucidum, Ganodermataceae, Polyporales	China.	Cap 107 cm (42 in) wide. Stem short; only ±7 cm (±3 in ) thick.		By one report 14.9 kg (33 lb) but by another 7.45 kg (16.4 lb).	
Grifola frondosa Polyporaceae	North Temperate Zone.			63 pounds (29 kilograms).	
Meripilus giganteus, Polyporaceae	Europe	Up to three feet (0.91 meters) wide, usually accompanied by smaller ones.			
Cerioporus squamosus, Polyporaceae	Cosmopolitan distribution.	226 cm (89 in) in circumference.		15.46 kg (34.1 lb).	
Fomes fomentarius, Polyporaceae	Widespread in north temperate zone.	88 cm (35 in) in width by 62 cm (24 in) top to bottom.	62 cm (24 in) top to bottom.	Weight not stated.	
Laccocephalum mylittae, Polyporaceae	Australia.			Up to 18.18 kg (40.1 lb).	
Laetiporus sulphureus, Polyporaceae	Widespread in Northern Hemisphere.	Approximately half of a specimen was 76 cm (30 in) wide by 41 cm (16 in) top to bottom.	41 cm (16 in) top to bottom.	This portion weighed 25.46 kg (56.1 lb)	The other half fell into a creek and could not be recovered.
Buglossoporus magnus, Fomitopsidaceae, Polyporales	Apparently endemic to the Malay Peninsula.	23.5 inches (60 cm) in width.		Weight not stated.	

== Mushroom-shaped fungi ==
Many families of fungi have fruiting bodies consisting of a roughly circular cap supported on a stalk, like the edible mushroom.

Species and family	Distribution	Dimensions	Height	Weight	Comments
Fomitiporia expansa, Hymenochaetaceae	Probably endemic to French Guiana and neighboring Suriname.	40 inches (1.0 m).		Weight not stated.	
Phlebopus marginatus, Boletaceae	Native to humid regions of Australia, New Zealand, Sri Lanka, Sumatra and Java.	One found in South Australia prior to 1934 had a cap 61 cm (24 in) wide by 46 cm (18 in) broad.		32.34 kg (71.3 lb)	Another, at Hall's Gap, Victoria in 1939 weighed 28.6 kg (63 lb) but was 77.5 cm (30.5 in) across the cap. The heaviest in recent years may be one discovered in Victoria in July 2012, which was found to weigh forty-four pounds (twenty kilograms).
Sparassis crispa, Sparassidaceae	Europe	One found in Mayres, France in October 2000. Dimensions not stated.		28.8 kg (63 lb).	
Macrocybe titans, Tricholomataceae	Found from northern Florida to southern Brazil	One found in Chiapas measured 68.8 cm (27.1 in) across the cap and 68.8 cm (27.1 in) in height. Another in Costa Rica measured 1 m (3 ft 3 in) in width.	68.8 cm (27.1 in) in height.	20 kg (44 lb).	This species was discovered in 1980.
Macrocybe gigantea, Tricholomataceae	Native to China, India, Pakistan, and Nepal.	83.5 cm (32.9 in) in height and 40 cm (16 in) in width.	83.5 cm (32.9 in) in height	Weight not stated.	
Bondarzewia berkeleyi, Bondarzewiaceae	Eastern North America, Europe, China, New Zealand and New Guinea among other places. Nowhere is it common.	Total width up to 1 m (3 ft 3 in).		Tuber and funnels can total up to 22.7 kg (50 lb).	One found in Lawrence, Kansas in 2008 was 90 cm (3.0 ft) wide and weighed 6.8 kg (15 lb), but it is not clear whether the sclerotium was included.
Termitomyces titanicus, Lyophyllaceae	Zambia, and the Katanga (Shaba) region of Congo (Zaire), in Central Africa.	63 cm (25 in) across the cap, and 56 cm (22 in) in height.	56 cm (22 in) in height.	Weight not stated.	Others are stated to be up to 1 m (3 ft 3 in) in diameter.
Phlebopus colossus, Boletaceae	Eastern Madagascar.	60 centimetres (24 inches) across the cap and ten inches (25 centimeters) in height.	25 cm (9.8 in) in height.	13 lbs (six kg).	
Leucocoprinus gongylophorus, Agaricaceae	Panama	20 inches (51 centimeters) across cap by twelve inches (30 centimeters) in height.	30 cm in height.	Weight not stated.	
Cantharellus californicus	Endemic to Oak forests in California.	Cap up to twenty inches (fifty cm) in width.	Approx. same height.	4.4 pounds (two kilograms).	
Aspropaxillus giganteus	northern temperate zone	Cap up to 18 inches (46 centimeters) in width, and about twelve inches (30 cm) in height.	30 cm (12 in) in height.	Weight not stated.	
Boletus edulis, Boletaceae	Widespread in northern temperate zone.	42 cm (17 in) across the cap atop a stem 14 cm (5.5 in) thick.		It weighed 3.2 kg (7.1 lb)	
Agaricus campestris, Agaricaceae	Throughout northern temperate zone.	4 feet 5 inches (135 centimetres) in circumference.		Weight not stated.	
Morchella esculenta, Morchellaceae	Widespread in northern temperate zone.	15 inches (38 centimeters) in height and 14 inches (36 cm) in cap girth.	37 cm (15 in) in height	It weighed 1.5 pounds (680 grams)	

== Puffballs ==
Puffballs are roughly spherical fungi that when ripe release spores through an opening in a puff of air.

Species and family	Distribution	Dimensions	Height	Weight	Comments
Calvatia gigantea, Lycoperdaceae	Of cosmopolitan distribution.	One found in Herkimer County, New York was 1.63 m (5 ft 4 in) wide by 1.37 m (4 ft 6 in) broad by 24 cm (9.4 in) high. Another found along the banks of the Kaministiquia River was 81 inches (210 cm) in girth.	24 cm (9.4 in) high.	One found in Montreal weighed 22 kg (49 lb), and was 2.64 m (8 ft 8 in) in circumference, while another had a weight of 25.9 kg (57 lb).	

== Unidentified specimens ==
Two large specimens are excluded from the list above. The first, a polypore photographed in 1903 at Yeerongpilly, Brisbane, Queensland, measured about 2 m (6 ft 7 in) in width by 1 m (3 ft 3 in) top to bottom, emerging from a tree about two 2 m (6 ft 7 in) thick. It was sturdy enough to support the weight of two average women.

The second is more speculative. Somewhere in his world travels, writer/naturalist/explorer Ivan T. Sanderson encountered reports of a species of fungi which "weigh a ton, and upheave large trees". The earliest report appears to have been in the writings of James Brooke.

== See also ==
- List of world records held by plants
- Largest organisms
