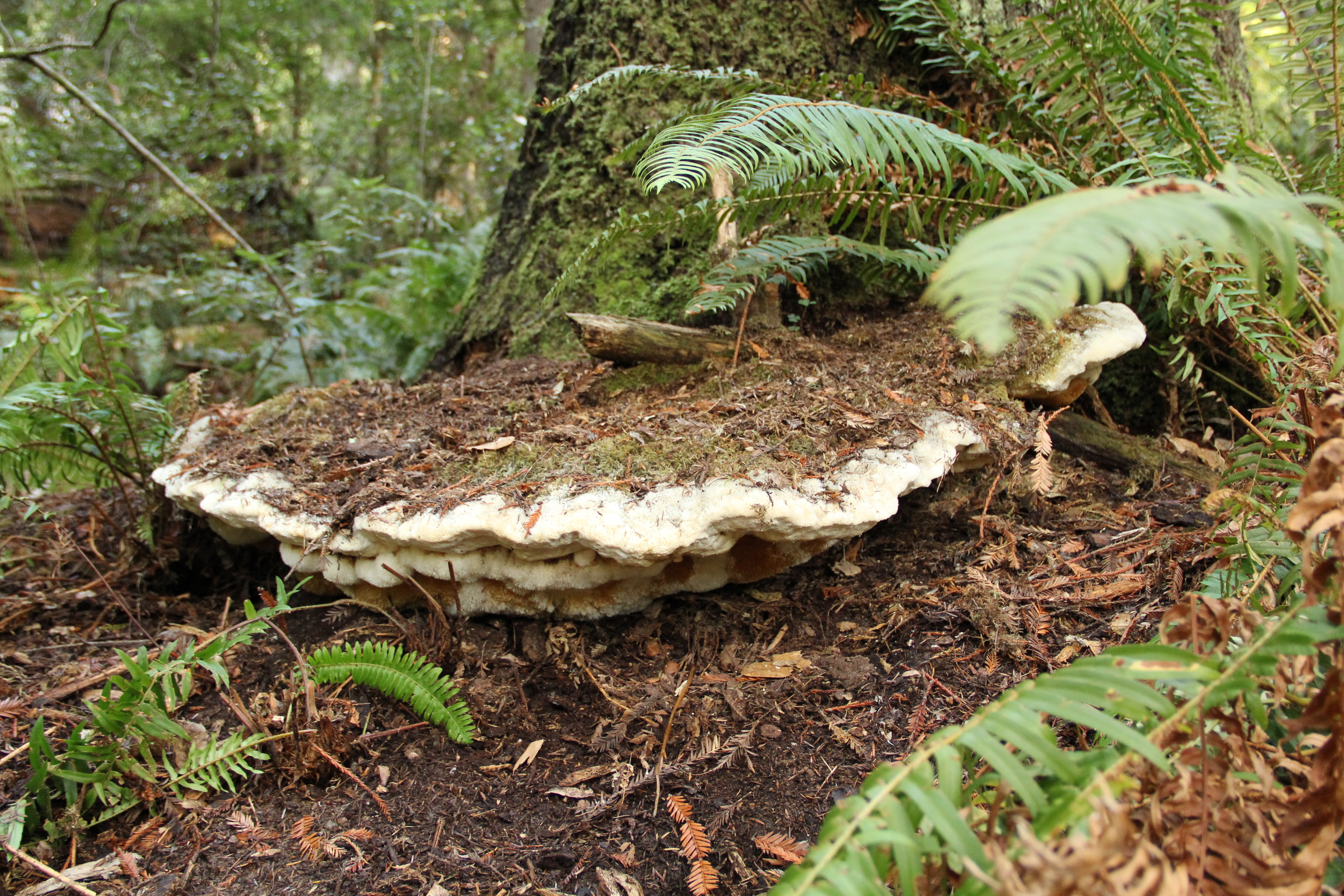

Conservation status
- Critically Endangered (IUCN 3.1)

- Vulnerable (NatureServe)

Scientific classification
- Kingdom: Fungi
- Division: Basidiomycota
- Class: Agaricomycetes
- Order: Polyporales
- Family: Polyporaceae
- Genus: Bridgeoporus; T.J.Volk, Burds. & Ammirati (1996)
- Species: B. nobilissimus

Binomial name
- Bridgeoporus nobilissimus (W.B.Cooke) T.J.Volk, Burds. & Ammirati (1996)

Synonyms
- Oxyporus nobilissimus W.B.Cooke (1949); Fomes nobilissimus (W.B.Cooke) J.Lowe (1955)

= Bridgeoporus =

Genus of fungi

Bridgeoporus is a fungal genus in the family Polyporaceae. A monotypic genus, it contains the single polypore species Bridgeoporus nobilissimus, first described to science in 1949. Commonly known both as the noble polypore and the fuzzy Sandozi, this fungus produces large fruit bodies (or conks) that have been found to weigh up to 130 kilograms (290 lb). The upper surface of the fruit body has a fuzzy or fibrous texture that often supports the growth of algae, bryophytes, or vascular plants.

This species is found in the Pacific Northwest region of North America where it grows on large (at least 1 m diameter) specimens of noble fir (Abies procera), Pacific silver fir (Abies amabilis), or western hemlock (Tsuga heterophylla). Bridgeoporus nobilissimus causes a brown rot in its tree hosts. Genetic analysis shows that the fungus is more prevalent than fruit body distribution indicates.

== Taxonomy ==
Bridgeoporus nobilissimus was named for William Bridge Cooke, who originally described the species as Oxyporus nobilissimus in 1949. The fungus was discovered in Clackamas County, Oregon, in 1943 by brothers Ali and Fred Sandoz. Foresters called the species Fomes fuzzii-sandozii, referring to the collectors and the fuzzy surface texture of the conk. Several collections were made in Oregon and Washington in subsequent years. A large specimen was collected in Lewis County, Washington in 1946 that weighed about 300 pounds (140 kg) and measured 56 inches (140 cm) by 37 inches (94 cm). Cooke learned of the fungus in 1948 while visiting Daniel Elliot Stuntz, who kept one of the large fruit bodies that he and Alexander H. Smith had previously collected in Mount Rainier National Park. This fruit body served as the type collection.

Species of genus Oxyporus cause white rot in their host trees. Cooke placed the fungus in this genus by despite not knowing definitively what type of rot it caused; he considered it to be closely related to Oxyporus populinus. In 1955, polypore specialist Josiah Lincoln Lowe transferred O. nobilissimus to Fomes, before the concept of this genus was narrowed. In 1996 the new genus Bridgeoporus was circumscribed by Harold Burdsall, Tom Volk and Joseph Ammirati to accommodate this species, in order to rectify incompatibilities with placements in Fomes and Oxyporus. In particular, genus Oxyporus features true cystidia arising from the subhymenium (the supportive hyphae underlying the hymenium), whereas B. nobilissimus has pseudocystidia (sterile structures arising deep in the subhymenium and protruding into the hymenium).

Phylogenetic analyses of mitochondrial small-subunit rDNA sequences suggests that B. nobilissimus, which belongs in the hymenochaetoid clade, is closely related to the genera Oxyporus and Schizopora. The hymenochaetoid clade includes wood-decaying species previously classified variously in the families Corticiaceae, Polyporaceae and Stereaceae.

== Description ==
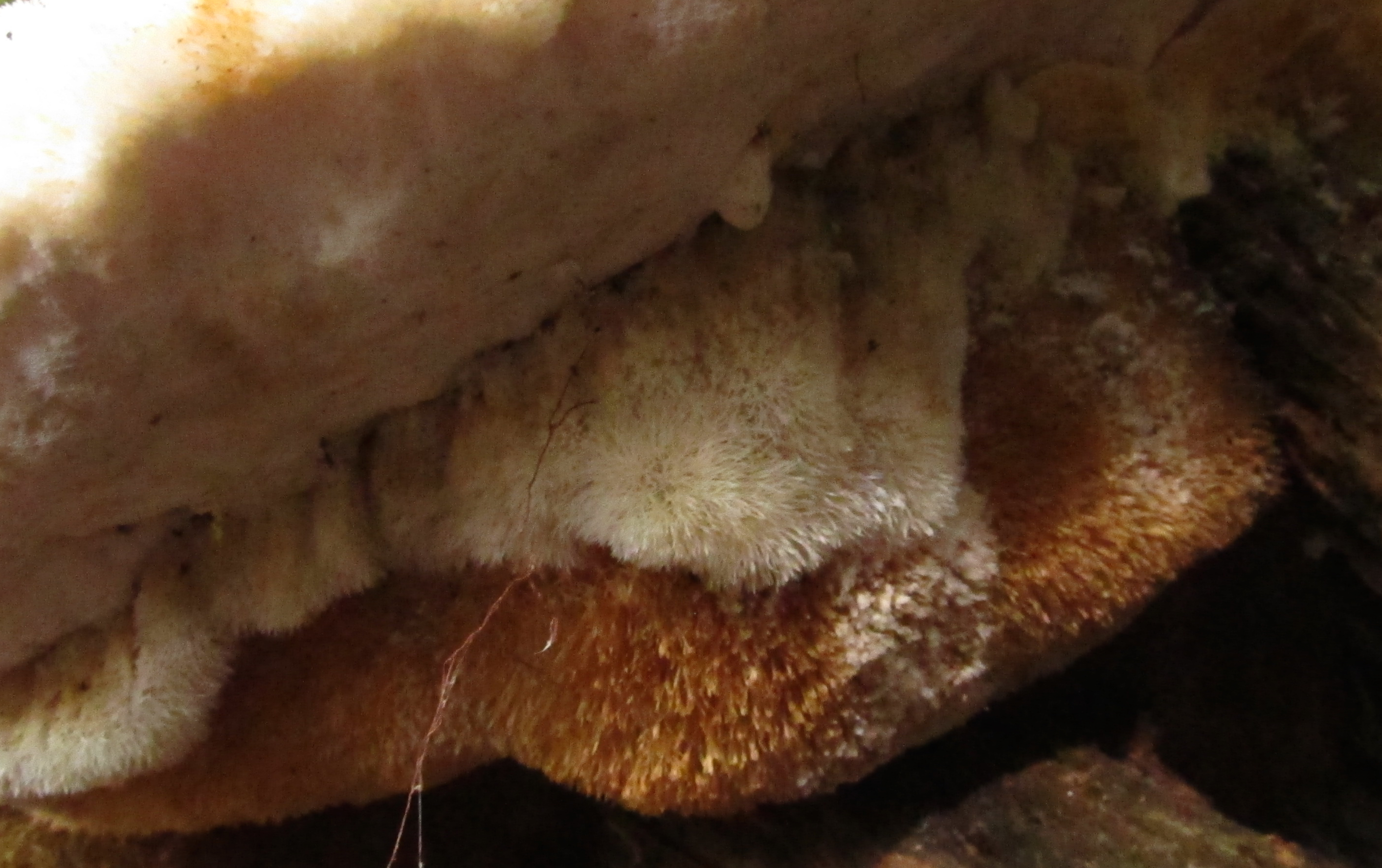
Closeup of "fuzzy" conk surface

Bridgeoporus nobilissimus has perennial, imbricate, sessile fruit bodies that measure 30–140 cm (12–55 in) by 25–95 cm (9 7/8–37 3/8 in) by 30–100 cm (12–39 in). From 1966 to 1990, this species was designated the largest pore fungus in the Guinness Book of World Records. Three fruit body shapes are associated with the fungus, depending largely on the location of the fruiting on the host tree. Hoof-shaped and shelf-like conks are located on the sides of hosts; short, oblong-topped conks with tapering pore surfaces occur on the main roots of the host; and centrally substipitate (conical) conks are found on the tops of stumps. The cap surface of young fruit bodies are covered with a dense mat of white mycelial fibers (up to several millimeters long) that in age darken in color and often become stuck together at their tips. Although the surface is typically brown or darker, it may appear green due to epiphytic associations with algae such as Coccomyxa or Charicium species. Bryophytes or sometimes vascular plants grow on the upper surface of the conk. The texture of the fruit body is fibrous; it is rubbery and tough when fresh, but becomes hard and brittle when it is dry. The pores on the underside of the fruit body are round, approximately 2 per mm. The tubes comprising the pores becomes stratified, layering over each other with each successive year of growth. There is a 2–3 mm-thick layer of sterile tissue between pore layers, and mature tube layers are 2–7 mm long.

Microscopically, B. nobilissimus is characterized by hyphae with a septum, pseudocystidia originating from the trama, closely appressed hyphae in bundles (fascicles) on the upper surface of the fruit body. The spore-bearing cells, the basidia, are 12–18 by 4–10 μm in size, pear-shaped, and four-spored. The roughly ovoid basidiospores are 5.5–6.5 by 3.5–4.5 μm, hyaline, smooth, and have thin walls.

== Habitat and distribution ==
The fruit bodies (also called conks) of Bridgeoporus are found singly or sometimes in overlapping layers on old trees (1–2 m (3 1/4–6 7/12 ft) diameter at breast height) of noble fir (Abies procera), and more rarely Pacific silver fir (Abies amabilis) or western hemlock (Tsuga heterophylla). It has also been recorded growing on a snag of redwood. Other tree species often found in B. nobilissimus habitats include Douglas-fir (Pseudotsuga menziesii), western redcedar (Thuja plicata), and western hemlock. Common shrubs at these sites include salal (Gaultheria shallon), Sitka alder (Alnus sinuata), rhododendron (Rhododendron macrophyllum), and Alaska blueberry (Vaccinium ovalifolium). The use of molecular genetic techniques has demonstrated that the fungus also lives in Douglas fir, western hemlock, and western redcedar, although its fruit bodies have not been seen on these hosts.

The fungus has been found in the Cascade Range in Washington and Oregon, the Coast Range on the Olympic Peninsula in Washington, and in Redwood National Park in northern California. Specimens have been found at elevations of 1,000–4,000 feet (300–1,220 m). Because the fungus feeds on both dead and living wood, it is both parasitic and saprophytic. B. nobilissimus fruit bodies do not occur on fallen logs or other forms of dead wood lacking roots or some connection to a root system. Conks have been found growing on the still-living roots of an upturned, windthrown tree, while a once-living conk died within several years after the host tree was uprooted by a fallen tree.

== Conservation ==
Threats to Bridgeoporus nobilissimus include extirpation of known and unknown habitats by logging, fire, or other disturbances, and forestry practices that lead to the loss of large-diameter Abies procera and Abies amabilis trees and large-diameter stumps and snags in managed forests. Due to the scarcity of its mature tree hosts, B. nobilissimus was listed in 1995 as an endangered species by the Oregon Natural Heritage Program, making it the first of the fungi to be listed as endangered by any private or public agency in the United States. It is the sole fungus in category A of the survey and management guidelines for fungi under the Northwest Forest Plan, meaning pre-disturbance surveys and site management are needed before developing areas known to harbor the fungus. There were 13 known sites with the fungus before 1998; extensive surveying in the Pacific Northwest increased this number to 103 sites by 2006. Although it is infrequently observed, the fungus is more abundant than fruit body appearance indicates. Using genetic markers to detect the fungus mycelium in hosts, researchers found that B. nobilissimus was present at low to moderate levels and widespread in forest stands containing at least a single visible fruit body. It was detected in trees of all sizes, and in species not previously thought to harbor the fungus. B. nobilissimus may require decades of mycelial growth in its host before fruit body production is initiated. The fungus has not been successfully grown in vitro despite several attempts.

== See also ==
- Phellinus ellipsoideus – the current record holder for largest polypore fungus
- List of world's largest mushrooms and conks
