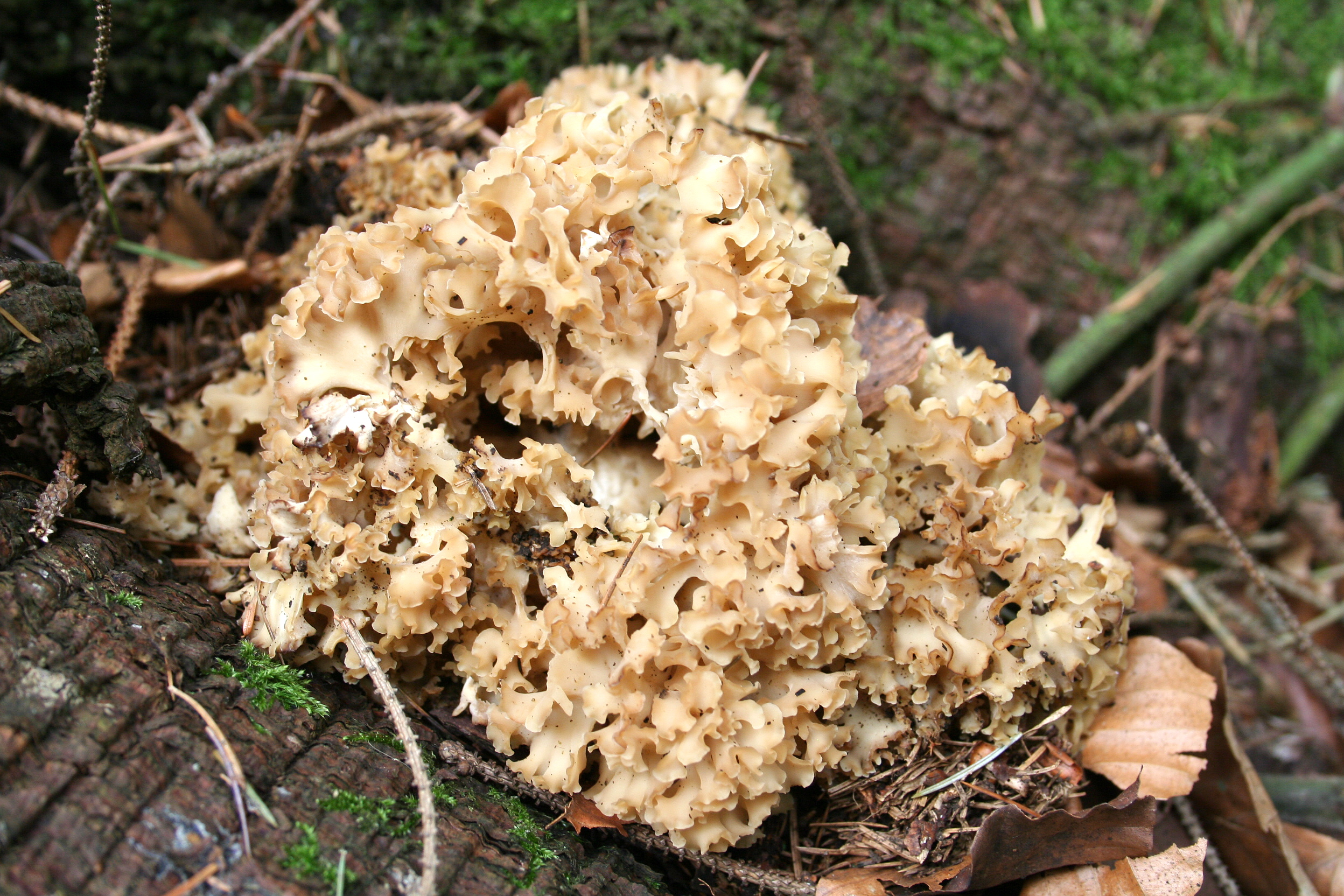
- Sparassis crispa

Scientific classification
- Kingdom: Fungi
- Division: Basidiomycota
- Class: Agaricomycetes
- Order: Polyporales
- Family: Sparassidaceae
- Genus: Sparassis; Fr. (1819)

Type species
- Sparassis crispa (Wulfen) Fr. 1821

Species
- See text.

= Sparassis =

Cauliflower mushroom

Genus of fungi

Sparassis (also known as cauliflower mushroom) is a genus of parasitic and saprobic mushroom characterised by its unique shape and appearance and is found around the globe. Its appearance can be described as similar to a sea sponge, a brain or a head of cauliflower, hence its popular name.

It is increasingly cultivated and sold in Korea, Japan, the United States and Australia.

The generic name comes from the Greek sparassein, meaning to tear.

== Species ==
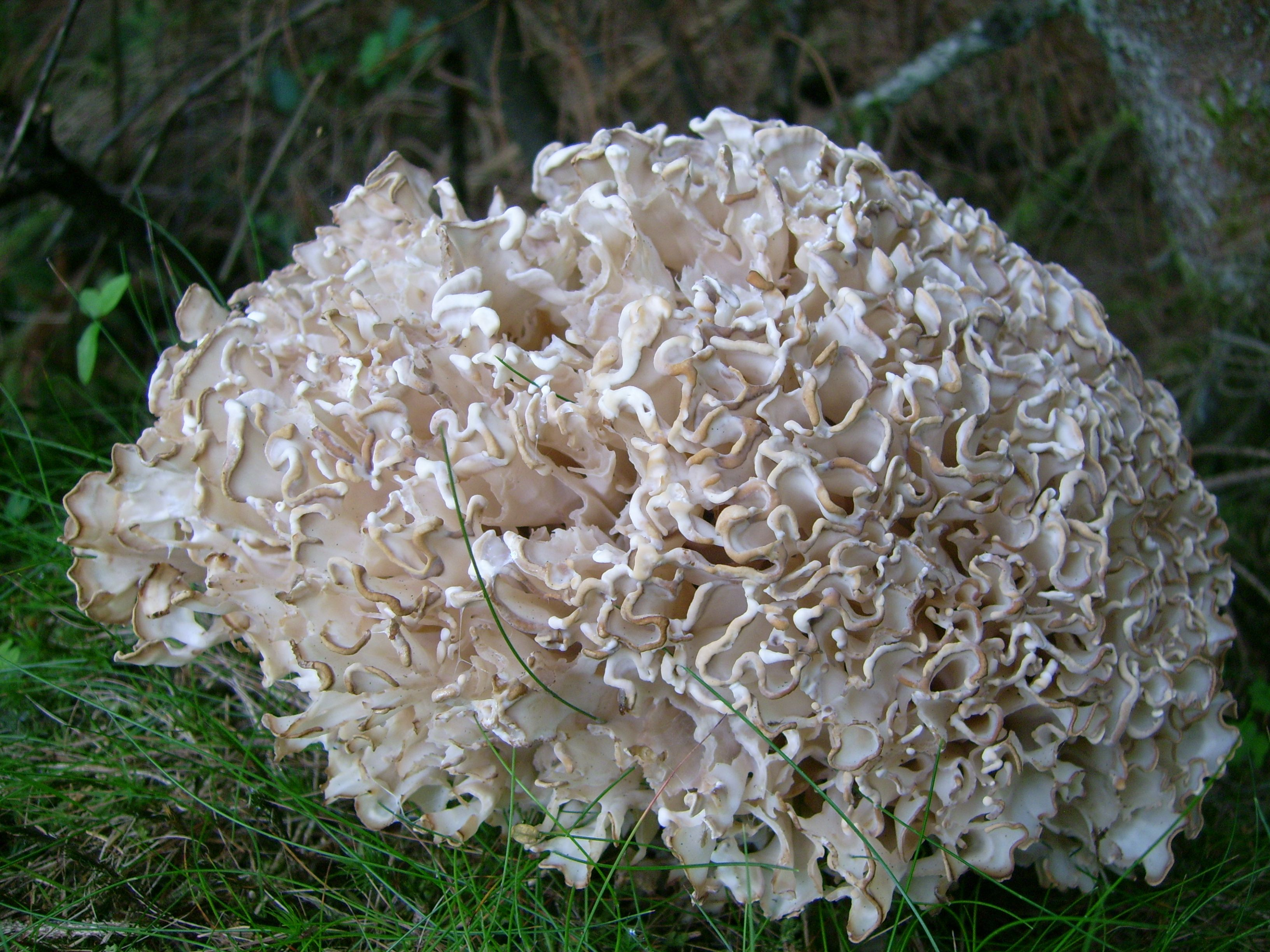
Sparassis brevipes

The following species are recognised in the genus Sparassis:

- Sparassis americana R.H. Petersen
- Sparassis brevipes Krombh.
- Sparassis crispa (Wulfen) Fr.
- Sparassis cystidiosa Desjardin & Zheng Wang
- Sparassis foliacea St.-Amans
- Sparassis herbstii Peck
- Sparassis kazachstanica Shvartsman
- Sparassis laminosa Fries
- Sparassis latifolia Y.C. Dai & Zheng Wang
- Sparassis miniensis Blanco-Dios & Z. Wang
- Sparassis minoensis Blanco-Dios & Z. Wang
- Sparassis nemecii Pilát & Veselý
- Sparassis radicata Weir
- Sparassis simplex D.A. Reid
- Sparassis spathulata (Schwein.) Fr.
- Sparassis subalpina Q. Zhao, Zhu L. Yang & Y.C. Dai
- Sparassis tremelloides Berkeley

The best-known and most widely collected species are S. crispa (found in Europe and eastern North America) and S. radicata (found in western North America). These species have a very similar appearance and some authorities treat them as conspecific. Their colour ranges from light brown-yellow to yellow-grey or a creamy-white cauliflower colour. They are normally 10 to 25 cm tall but can grow to be quite large, with reported cases of fruiting bodies more than 50cm tall and 14 kg in weight. Their unique look and size means they are unlikely to be mistaken for any poisonous/inedible mushrooms. They grow as parasites or saprobes on the roots or bases of various species of hardwoods, especially oak, and conifers, and hence are most commonly found growing close to fir, pine, oak or spruce trees.

== Edibility ==
Sparassis crispa are edible but require thoroughly cleaning before consumption—the folds may contain dirt and other material because, as it grows, the basidiocarp envelops objects such as pine needles. Italian gastronome Antonio Carluccio said that European S. crispa should be picked when creamy white, because once yellow it is too indigestible to eat. The mushroom retains its cartilaginous texture after drying and reconstituting, which Carluccio takes to recommend inclusion in soups.

S. radicata is also edible, as is S. spathulata, a cauliflower mushroom which looks similar to Grifola frondosa.

S. crispa is also widely used in traditional Chinese medicine and contains active pharmacological ingredients. In order to study its medicinal value better, the genomic sequence of S. crispa was published in October 2018. The dry weight of the basidiocarp was found to contain up to 43.6% beta-glucan, which was approved for the treatment of cancer in Japan and most recently studied for its role in inflammation of COVID-19 patients

Experiments suggest that S. crispa contains chemicals that may stimulate the immune system and contains compounds with various biological properties including: anti-tumor, antiviral activity (reverse transcriptase inhibitory activity), neuroprotection, cardioprotection, anti-inflammation, hyperlipidemia, anti-diabetic medication, antimicrobial compounds, and methicillin-resistant Staphylococcus aureus (MRSA).

== See also ==
- Medicinal fungi
