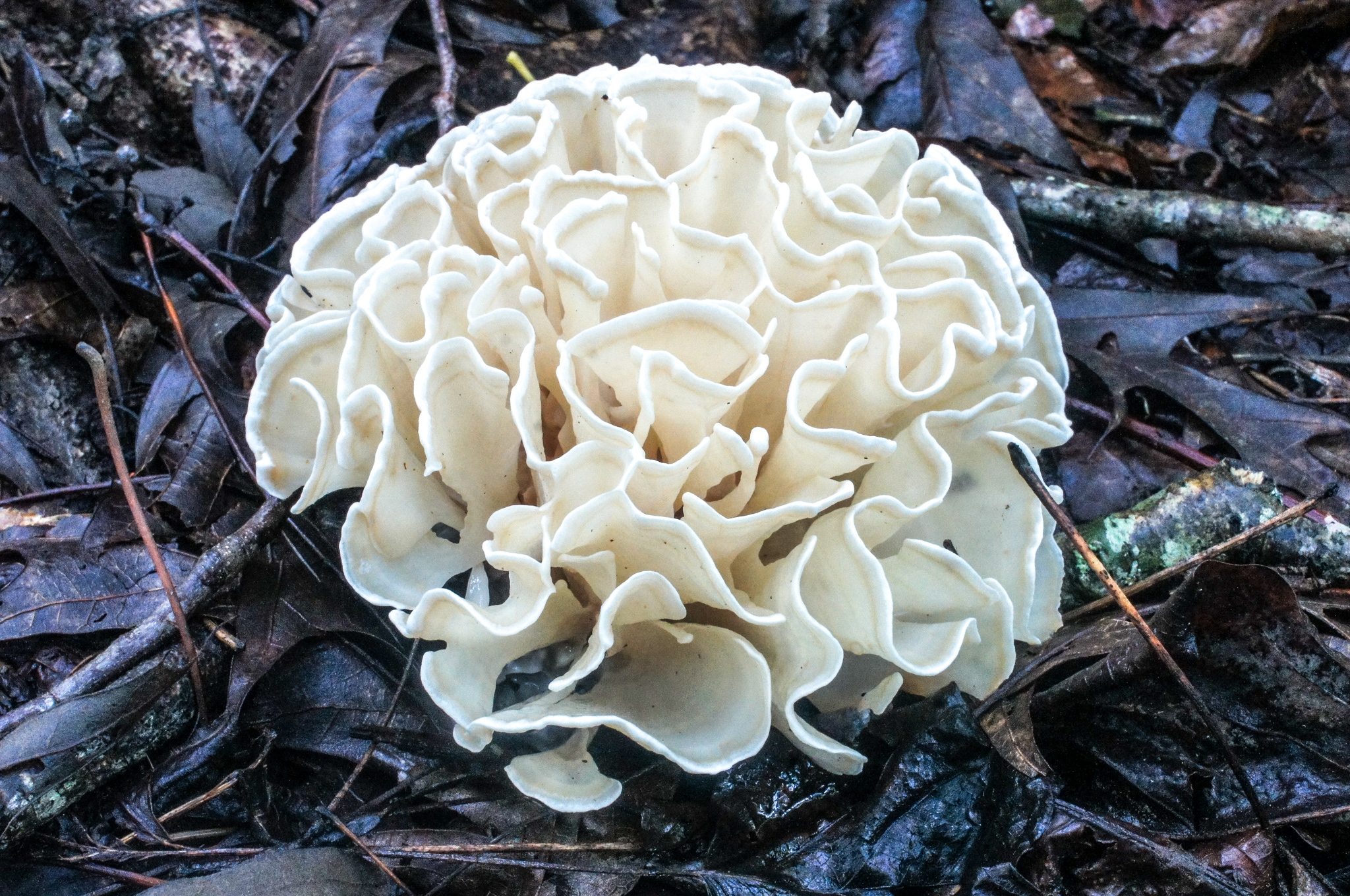
- Sparassis spathulata

Scientific classification
- Kingdom: Fungi
- Division: Basidiomycota
- Class: Agaricomycetes
- Order: Polyporales
- Family: Sparassidaceae
- Genus: Sparassis
- Species: S. spathulata

Binomial name
- Sparassis spathulata (Schwein.) Fr.

Synonyms
- Sparassis herbstii Pk. Sparassis caroliniense

= Sparassis spathulata =

Sparassis spathulata
- Mycological characteristics
- Smooth hymenium
- Hymenium attachment is not applicable
- Lacks a stipe
- Spore print is white to cream
- Ecology is saprotrophic
- Edibility is choice

Sparassis spathulata is a species of fungus in the genus Sparassis. It has the variant Sparassis spathulata f. herbstii. (previously considered S. herbstii).

== Description ==
The fruiting body forms a dome 10–40 centimetres (4–15 1/2 in) wide, with many pale lobes, which are usually unruffled and can be faintly zonate. It grows from a rooted stem.

=== Similar species ===
It can be confused with the more intricately lobed S. crispa and possibly S. radicata. Hydnopolyporus fimbriatus can have tattered edges and grows from a clustered mass of unrooted branches.

== Distribution and habitat ==
Sparassis spathulata can be found between eastern Texas and northeastern North America from July to September.

== Uses ==
It is a good edible mushroom.
