= Sparassiella =

Scientific classification
- Kingdom: Fungi
- Division: Basidiomycota
- Class: Agaricomycetes
- Order: Polyporales
- Family: Sparassidaceae
- Genus: Sparassiella; Schwarzman (1964)

Type species
- Sparassiella longistipitata Schwarzman (1964)

Genus of fungi

Sparassiella is a fungal genus in the family Sparassidaceae. It is monotypic, containing the single species Sparassiella longistipitata, described as new to science in 1964. This fungus is found in the former USSR. The type collection was made in Kazakhstan, where it was found growing on the dead wood of Scots pine.
