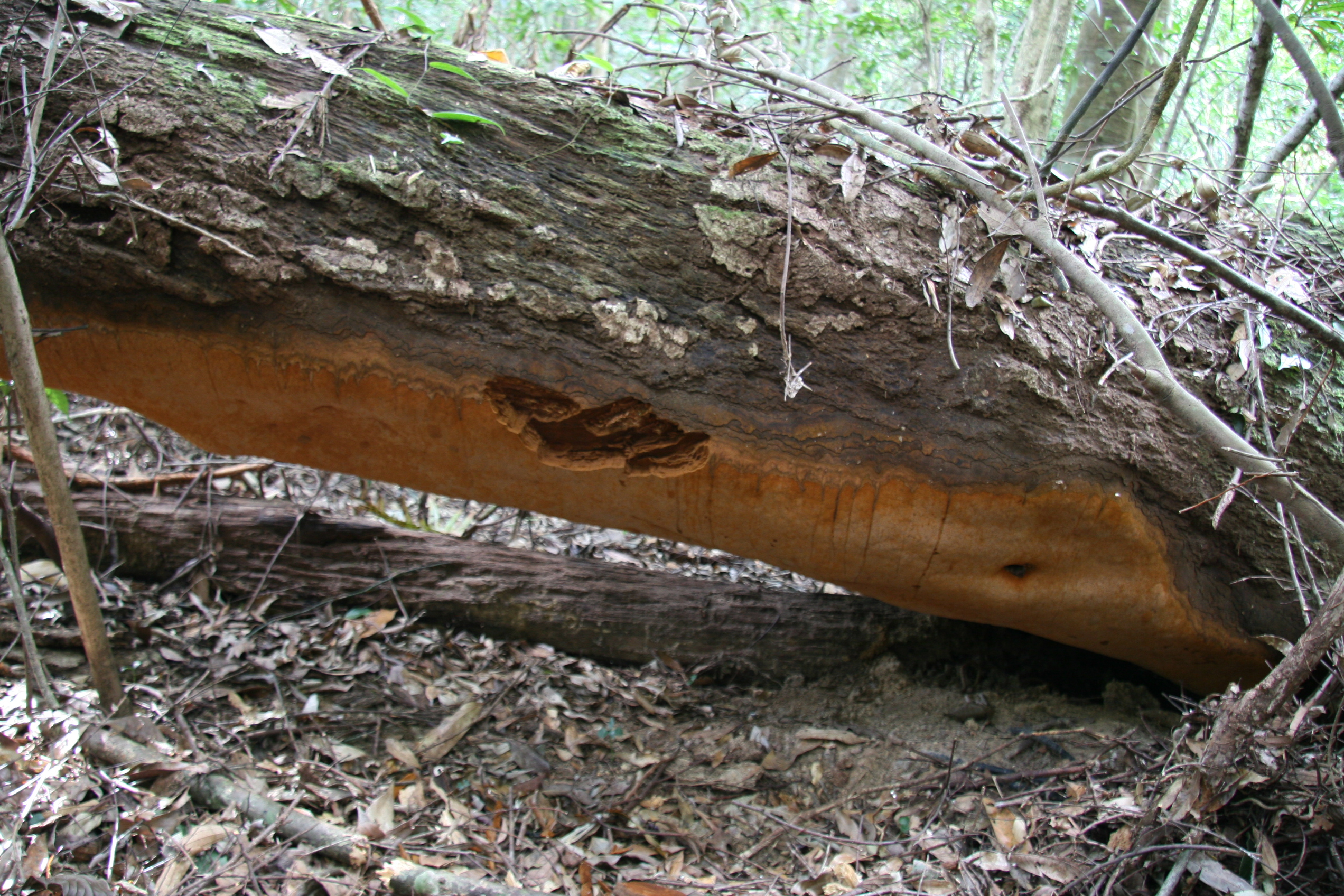
- The large fruit body discovered in 2008

Scientific classification
- Kingdom: Fungi
- Division: Basidiomycota
- Class: Agaricomycetes
- Order: Hymenochaetales
- Family: Hymenochaetaceae
- Genus: Phellinus
- Species: P. ellipsoideus

Binomial name
- Phellinus ellipsoideus (B.K.Cui & Y.C.Dai) B.K.Cui, Y.C.Dai & Decock (2013)

Synonyms
- Fomitiporia ellipsoidea B.K.Cui & Y.C.Dai (2008)

= Phellinus ellipsoideus =

Species of fungus in the family Hymenochaetaceae found in China

Phellinus ellipsoideus (formerly Fomitiporia ellipsoidea) is a species of polypore fungus in the family Hymenochaetaceae, a specimen of which produced the largest fungal fruit body ever recorded. Found in China, the fruit bodies produced by the species are brown, woody basidiocarps that grow on dead wood, where the fungus feeds as a saprotroph. The basidiocarps are perennial, allowing them to grow very large under favourable circumstances. They are resupinate, measuring 30 centimetres (12 in) or more in length, though typically extending less than a centimetre from the surface of the wood. P. ellipsoideus produces distinct ellipsoidal spores, after which it is named, and unusual setae. These two features allow it to be readily differentiated microscopically from other, similar species. Chemical compounds isolated from the species include several steroidal compounds. These may have pharmacological applications, but further research is needed.

The species was named in 2008 by Bao-Kai Cui and Yu-Cheng Dai based on collections made in Fujian Province. It was placed in the genus Fomitiporia, but later analysis suggests that it is more closely related to Phellinus species. It was revealed in 2011 that a very large fruit body, measuring up to 1,085 cm (427 in) in length, had been found on Hainan Island. The specimen, which was 20 years old, was estimated to weigh between 400 and 500 kilograms (880 and 1,100 lb). This was markedly larger than the previously largest recorded fungal fruit body, a specimen of Rigidoporus ulmarius found in the United Kingdom that had a circumference of 425 cm (167 in). The findings were formally published in September 2011, but attracted international attention from the mainstream press prior to this.

== Taxonomy and phylogenetics ==
The species was first described in 2008 by Bao-Kai Cui and Yu-Cheng Dai, both of the Beijing Forestry University. Five specimens of the then-unknown species were collected during field work in the Wanmulin Nature Reserve (27°03′N 118°08′E), Jian'ou, Fujian Province. The pair named the species Fomitiporia ellipsoidea in an article in the journal Mycotaxon. The specific name ellipsoidea is from the Latin meaning "ellipsoid", and refers to the shape of the spores. Species of the order Hymenochaetales, to which this taxon belongs, make up 25% of the over 700 species of polypore found in China.

Phylogenetic analysis of large subunit and internal transcribed spacer DNA sequence data, the results of which were published in 2012, concluded that the species then known as F. ellipsoidea was closely related to Phellinus gabonensis, P. caribaeo-quercicolus and the newly described P. castanopsidis. The four species share morphological characteristics, and form a monophyletic clade. This clade resolved more closely with the Phellinus type species P. igniarius than it did with the Fomitiporia type species F. langloisii, and so the authors proposed a transference of F. ellipsoidea to Phellinus, naming the new combination Phellinus ellipsoideus. The taxonomic databases Index Fungorum and MycoBank list Phellinus ellipsoideus as the correct binomial, though some mycologists consider Fomitiporia to be a synonym of Phellinus anyway.

== Description ==
Phellinus ellipsoideus
- Mycological characteristics
- Pores on hymenium
- Hymenium attachment is not applicable
- Lacks a stipe
- Ecology is saprotrophic
- Edibility is inedible

Phellinus ellipsoideus produces resupinate fruit bodies that are hard and woody, whether fresh or dry. The original description characterized them as measuring up to 30 centimetres (12 in) "or more" in length, 20 cm (7.9 in) in width, and extending 8 mm (0.3 in) from the wood on which they grow at their thickest point. (Note: These sizes are based on the original description offered by Cui and Dai in 2008. Dai described the type specimen as "not huge", and a significantly larger specimen has since been found. Dai said that, before the discovery, he and Cui "did not know the fungus [could] grow so huge".) The outermost layer is typically yellow to yellowish-brown, measuring 2 mm (0.08 in) in thickness. The shiny surface of the hymenium, the spore-producing section of the fruit body, is covered in pores and ranges in colour from yellow-brown to rust-brown. There are between 5 and 8 pores per millimetre. The tubes are up to 8 mm (0.3 in) in depth, have the same colouration as the surface of the hymenium, and are distinctively layered. They are also hard and woody. The very thin yellow-brown layer of flesh measures less than 0.5 mm (0.02 in) in width. As with much of the rest of the fruit body, it is firm, solid, and reminiscent of wood. The fruit bodies lack any odour or taste.

=== Microscopic features ===
Phellinus ellipsoideus produces basidiospores that are ellipsoidal or broadly ellipsoidal in shape. The spore shape is one of the features that makes the species readily recognisable microscopically, and the spores measure from 4.5 to 6.1 by 3.5 to 5 micrometres (μm). The average spore length is 5.25 μm, while the average width is 4.14 μm. The spores have thick cell walls, and are hyaline. They are strongly cyanophilous, meaning that the cell walls will readily absorb methyl blue stain. In addition, they are weakly dextrinoid, meaning that they will stain slightly reddish-brown in Melzer's reagent or Lugol's solution. The spores are borne on barrel-shaped basidia, with four spores per basidium, measuring 8 to 12 by 6 to 7 μm. There are also basidioles, which are similar in shape to the basidia, but slightly smaller.

In addition to the spore shape, the species is readily identified with the use of a microscope because of its setae. Setae are a kind of unusual cystidia unique to the family Hymenochaetaceae, and, in P. ellipsoideus, are found in the hymenium. In shape, the setae are ventricose, with distinctive hooks on their tips. In colour, they are yellow-brown, and they have thick cell walls. They measure 20 to 30 by 10 to 14 μm. Neither more standard cystidia nor cystidioles (underdeveloped cystidia) can be found in the species, but there are a number of rhomboid crystals throughout the hymenium and the flesh.

Most of the tissue of a fungal fruit body is made up of hyphae, which can be of three forms: generative, skeletal and binding. In P. ellipsoideus, the tissue is dominated by skeletal hyphae, but also has generative hyphae; it lacks binding hyphae. For this reason, the hyphal structure of P. ellipsoideus is referred to as "dimitic". The hyphae are divided into separate cells by septae, and lack clamp connections. The skeletal hyphae do not react with Melzer's reagent or Lugol's solution, and are not cyanophilous. While the hyphae will darken when a solution of potassium hydroxide is applied (the KOH test), they remain otherwise unchanged.

The main structure of the fruit body consists primarily of an agglutination (mass) of interwoven skeletal hyphae, which are golden- to rust-brown. The hyphae are unbranched, forming long tubes 2 to 3.6 μm in diameter, enveloping a lumen of variable thickness. There are also hyaline generative hyphae. These hyphae have thinner walls than the skeletal hyphae, and are also septate (possessing of septa), but are sometimes branched. They measure 2 to 3 μm in diameter. The flesh, again, is primarily made up of skeletal hyphae with some generative hyphae. The thick-walled skeletal hyphae are a yellow-brown to rust brown, and are slightly less agglutinate. The hyphae in the flesh are a little smaller; the skeletal hyphae measure 1.8 to 3.4 μm in diameter, while the generative hyphae measure 1.5 to 2.6 μm in diameter.

=== Similar species ===
A cogeneric species potentially similar to Phellinus ellipsoideus is P. caribaeo-quercicola. The latter species shares the hooked hymenial setae and ellipsoidal to broadly ellipsoidal spores. However, details of the fruit body differ, and the spores are hyaline to yellowish, and not dextrinoid. Further, the species is known only from tropical America, where it grows on the Cuban oak. P. castanopsidis, newly described in 2013, is not perennial, and has a pale greyish-brown pore surface. The spores are also slightly larger than those of P. ellipsoideus.

Phellinus ellipsoideus differs from species of Fomitiporia in two key respects. Its spores are less dextrinoid than those of the genus and their shape is atypical. Other than this, it is typical of the genus, according to the original description. Five species of Fomitiporia, F. bannaensis, F. pseudopunctata, F. sonorae, F. sublaevigata and F. tenuis, share with P. ellipsoideus the resupinate fruit bodies and the setae in the hymenium. Despite this, all of them but P. ellipsoideus have straight hymenial setae, and all of them have spores that are spherical or almost spherical, which is much more typical of the genus. F. uncinata (formerly Phellinus uncinatus) has hooked hymenial setae, and the spores are, as with P. ellipsoideus, thick-walled and dextrinoid. The species can be differentiated by the fact the spores are spherical or nearly so, and somewhat larger than those of P. ellipsoideus, measuring 5.5 to 7 by 5 to 6.5 μm. The species is also known only from tropical America, where it grows on bamboo.

== Distribution and ecology ==
The locations of the type specimen's collection (A, Fujian Province) and the large fruit body's discovery (B, Hainan Province). P. ellipsoideus is found in "subtropical to tropical" areas of China.

Phellinus ellipsoideus has been recorded growing on the fallen wood of oaks of the subgenus Cyclobalanopsis, as well as the wood of other flowering plants. The species favours the trunks of trees, where it feeds as a saprotroph, causing white rot. P. ellipsoideus fruit bodies are perennial growers, allowing them to, in the correct circumstances, grow very large. The species is found in the tropical and subtropical areas of China; it has been recorded in Fujian Province and Hainan Province. It is not a common species, and fruit bodies are only occasionally encountered.

=== Largest fruit body ===
In 2010, Cui and Dai were performing field work in tropical woodland on Hainan Island, China, studying wood-rotting fungi. The pair uncovered a very large P. ellipsoideus fruit body on a fallen Quercus asymmetrica log, which turned out to be the largest fungal fruit body ever documented. The fruit body was found at an altitude of 958 metres (3,143 ft), in old-growth forest. They were initially unable to identify the specimen as P. ellipsoideus, because of its large size, but tests revealed its identity after samples were taken for analysis. After their initial encounter with the large fruit body, Cui and Dai returned to it on two subsequent occasions, so that they could study it further. Nicholas P. Money, the executive editor of Fungal Biology, in which the findings were published, praised the pair for not removing the fruit body, thereby allowing it "to continue its business and to marvel visitors to Hainan Island". The discovery was formally published in Fungal Biology in September 2011, but gained attention in the mainstream press worldwide prior to this.

The fruit body was 20 years old, and up to 1,085 cm (35.60 ft) long. It was between 82 and 88 cm (32 and 35 in) wide, and between 4.6 and 5.5 cm (1.8 and 2.2 in) thick. The total volume of the fruit body was somewhere between 409,000 and 525,000 cubic centimetres (25,000 and 32,000 in^{3}). It was estimated to weigh between 400 and 500 kilograms (880 and 1,100 lb), based on three samples from different areas of the fruit body. The specimen had an average of 49 pores per square millimetre, roughly equivalent to 425 million pores. Money estimated that, based on spore output from other polypore species, the fruit body would be able to release a trillion spores a day.

Prior to this discovery, the largest recorded fruit body of any fungus was a specimen of Rigidoporus ulmarius, found in Kew Gardens, United Kingdom. It measured 150 by 133 cm (59 by 52 in) in diameter, and had a circumference of 425 cm (167 in). While the largest individual fruit bodies belong to polypores, individual organisms belonging to certain Armillaria species can grow extremely large. In 2003, a large specimen of A. solidipes (synonymous with A. ostoyae) was recorded in the Blue Mountains, Oregon, covering an area of 965 hectares (2,380 acres). At the time, the organism was estimated to be 8650 years old. Prior to this, an A. gallica (synonymous with A. bulbosa) organism was the largest recorded, covering 15 hectares (37 acres), weighing approximately 9,700 kilograms (21,400 lb). However, whilst these organisms cover a large area, the individual fruit bodies (the mushrooms) are not remarkably large, typically with stems of up to 10 centimetres (3.9 in) in height and caps less than 15 centimetres (5.9 in) in diameter, weighing from 40 to 100 grams (1.4 to 3.5 oz) each.

== Medicinal uses and biochemistry ==
Ergosterol, a chemical isolated from P. ellipsoideus

The fruit bodies of both Phellinus and Fomitiporia species have seen use in traditional medicine for gastrointestinal cancer and heart disease.

In 2011, research into the chemistry of P. ellipsoideus was published in the journal Mycosystema by Cui, along with Hai-Ying Bao and Bao-Kai Liu of the Jilin Agricultural University. The research discussed how several chemical compounds could be isolated from P. ellipsoideus with petroleum ether and (after defatting) chloroform. The nine compounds isolated from these extracts included the common ergosterol and its derivative ergosterol peroxide. Two of the compounds, ergosta-7,22,25-triene-3-one and benzo[1,2-b:5,4-b']difuran-3,5-dione-8-methyl formate, were new to science. All of these chemicals were steroidal; such compounds play important physiological roles in cell membranes.

Steroidal compounds, like those isolated from P. ellipsoideus, can have pharmacological applications; for instance, some can act as anti-inflammatories (including ergosterol) or inhibit tumour growth. The 2011 study concluded that, as P. ellipsoideus contained a large number of diverse steroidal compounds, there may be comparatively high pharmacological activity in the fungus; however, more research would be needed to confirm this. Later publications echoed this research, claiming that the fungus has "potential medicinal functions". Research published in 2012 named fomitiporiaester A, a natural furan derivative isolated from methanolic extract of P. ellipsoideus fruit bodies. The chemical, methyl 3,5-dioxo-1,3,5,7-tetrahydrobenzo[1,2-c:4,5-c']difuran-4-carboxylate, displayed significant antitumour ability in a mouse model.

== Industrial uses ==
Phellinus ellipsoideus is used to make MuSkin, a mushroom leather, which is a vegan alternative to leather.

== See also ==
- Largest organisms
- Largest fungal fruit bodies
