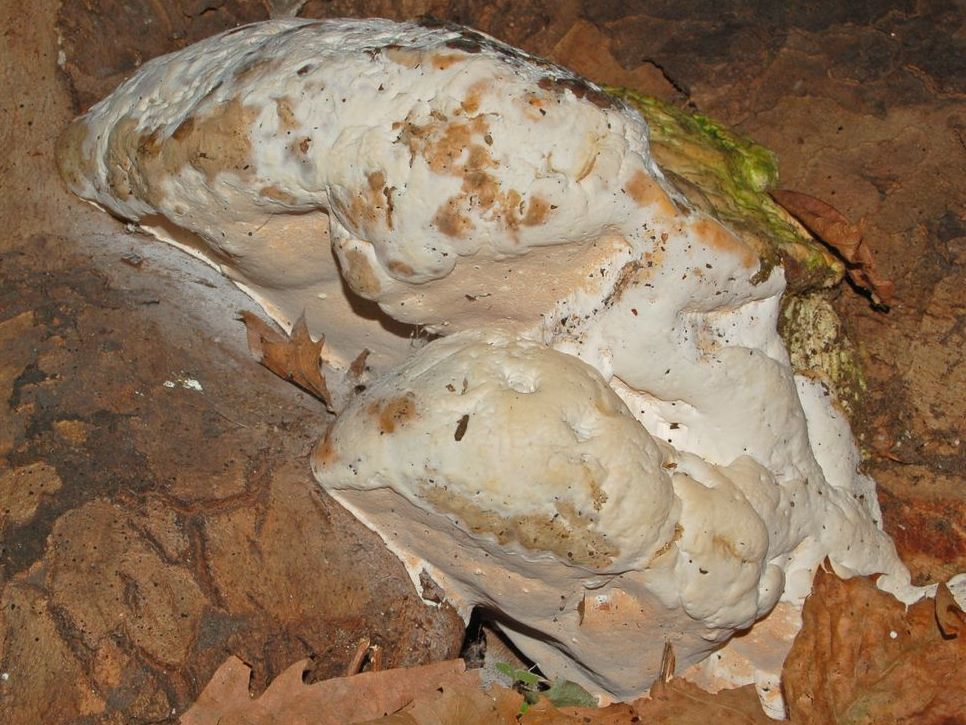

Scientific classification
- Domain: Eukaryota
- Kingdom: Fungi
- Division: Basidiomycota
- Class: Agaricomycetes
- Order: Polyporales
- Family: Meripilaceae
- Genus: Rigidoporus
- Species: R. ulmarius

Binomial name
- Rigidoporus ulmarius (Sowerby) Imazeki (1952)

Synonyms
- Boletus ulmarius Sowerby (1797); Coriolus actinobolus (Mont.) Pat. (1903); Fomes geotropus (Cooke) Cooke (1885); Fomes ulmarius Fr. (1874); Fomes ulmarius (Sowerby) Gillet (1878); Fomitopsis ulmaria (Sowerby) Bondartsev & Singer (1941); Haploporus cytisinus (Berk.) Domanski (1973); Leucofomes ulmarius (Sowerby) Kotl. & Pouzar (1957); Mensularia ulmaria (Sowerby) Lázaro Ibiza, (1916); Microporus actinobolus (Mont.) Kuntze (1898); Placodes incanus Quél. (1886); Placodes ulmarius (Sowerby) Quél. (1886); Polyporus actinobolus Mont. (1854); Polyporus cytisinus Berk. (1836); Polyporus fraxineus Lloyd (1915); Polyporus geotropus Cooke (1884); Polyporus sublinguaeformis Schulzer (1882); Polyporus ulmarius (Sowerby) Fr. (1821); Polystictus actinobolus (Mont.) Cooke (1886); Rigidoporus geotropus (Cooke) Dhanda (1981); Rigidoporus geotropus (Cooke) Imazeki (1955); Scindalma cytisinum (Berk.) Kuntze (1898); Scindalma geotropum (Cooke) Kuntze (1898); Scindalma ulmarium (Sowerby) Kuntze (1898); Ungulina cytisina (Berk.) Murashk. (1940); Ungulina incana (Quél.) Pat. (1900); Ungulina ulmaria (Sowerby) Pat. (1900)

= Rigidoporus ulmarius =

Species of fungus

Rigidoporus ulmarius is a fungal plant pathogen found mainly on broad-leaved trees. Elm is considered particularly susceptible.

The fruiting bodies are white, knobbly and relatively hard, requiring a fair amount of force to break. Older bodies may be covered with green algae, or partially covered with vegetation and leaves making them difficult to spot. They often encapsulate grass, twigs and other debris.

Tubes are 1–5 mm long in each layer, pinkish to orange when young, browning with age, each layer separated by a thin contrasting band of white flesh. Pores 5–8 per millimeter, red-orange fading to clay-pink or buff with age. Spores pale yellow, globose, 6–7.5 μm in diameter. Hyphal structure monomitic; generative hyphae lacking clamps. Habitat at the base of trunks of deciduous trees, usually elm. Season all year, perennial. Common. Not edible. Found in Europe.

A fruit body of R. ulmarius discovered in Kew Gardens of London in 2003 was, for a time, the largest known fungal fruit body ever discovered, measuring 150 by 133 centimetres (59 by 52 in) in diameter, and had a circumference of 425 centimetres (167 in). However, in 2011, a specimen of Phellinus ellipsoideus (formerly Fomitiporia ellipsoidea) significantly larger was discovered in China.

== See also ==
- Largest fungal fruit bodies
- Largest organisms
