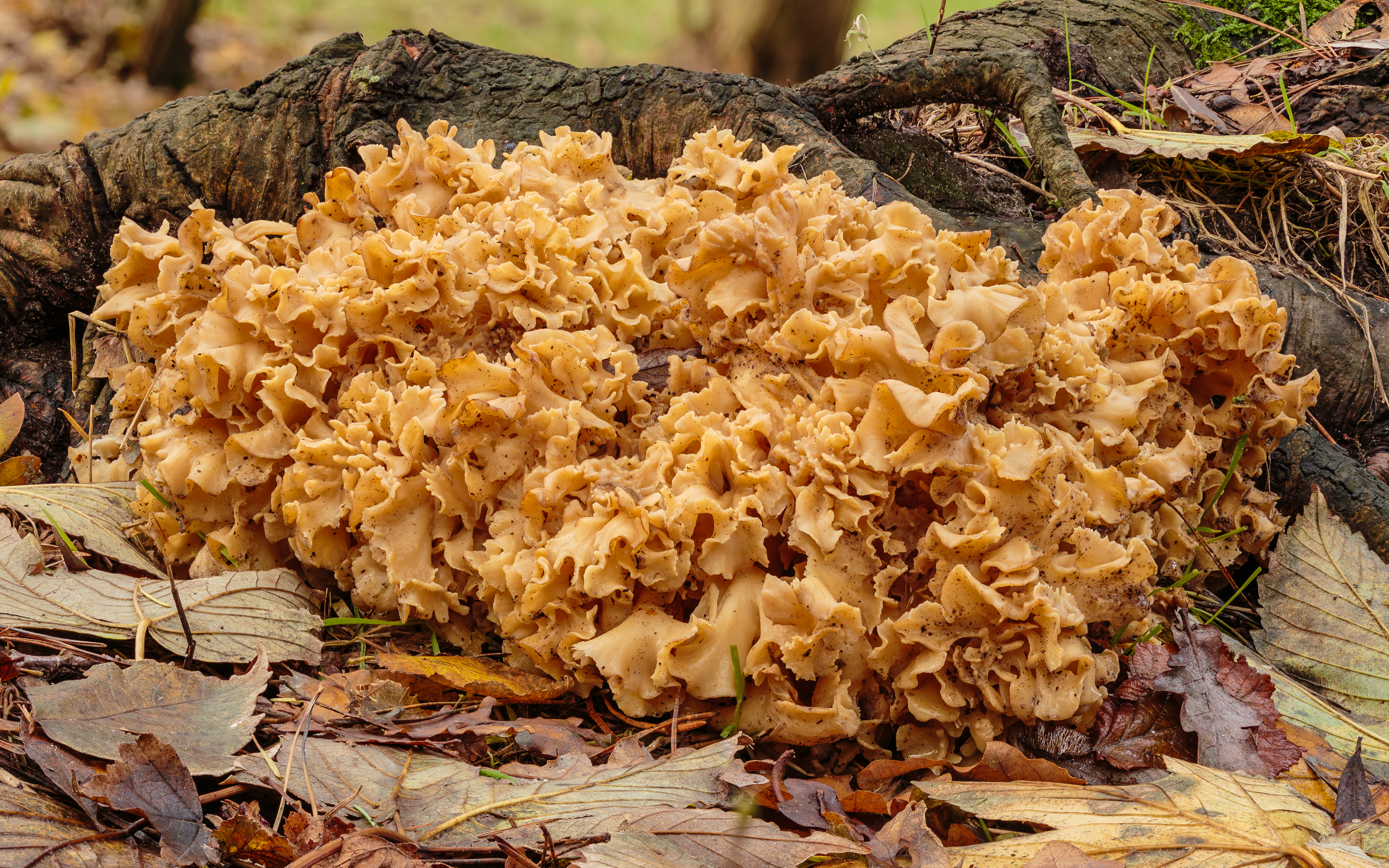

Scientific classification
- Kingdom: Fungi
- Division: Basidiomycota
- Class: Agaricomycetes
- Order: Polyporales
- Family: Sparassidaceae
- Genus: Sparassis
- Species: S. crispa

Binomial name
- Sparassis crispa (Wulfen) Fr. (1821)

Synonyms
- Clavaria crispa Wulfen (1781)

= Sparassis crispa =

Species of fungus

Sparassis crispa Mycological characteristics
- Smooth hymenium
- No distinct cap
- Hymenium attachment is irregular or not applicable
- Lacks a stipe or is bare
- Spore print is white to cream
- Ecology is saprotrophic
- Edibility is choice

Sparassis crispa is a species of fungus in the family Sparassidaceae. It is sometimes called cauliflower fungus, or cauliflower mushroom.

== Description ==
S. crispa grows in an entangled globe that is up to 24 centimetres (10 in) in diameter, with larger specimens weighing 14 kilograms (30 lb) or more. The lobes, which carry the spore-bearing surface, are flat and wavy, resembling lasagna pasta, coloured white to creamy yellow. When young they are tough and rubbery but later they become soft. They are monomitic. The odour is pleasant and the taste of the flesh mild.

The spore print is cream, the smooth oval spores measuring 5–7 μm by 3.5–5 μm. The flesh contains clamp connections.

=== Similar species ===
The less well-known S. brevipes, found in Europe, can be distinguished by its less crinkled, zoned folds and lack of clamp connections. In the North American Pacific Northwest, a lookalike species S. radicata (possibly a synonym) can be found from August to November. S. spathulata may replace the species in eastern North America.

== Distribution and habitat ==
This species is fairly common in Great Britain and temperate Europe (but not in the boreal zone), from July to November. It is a brown rot fungus, found growing parasitically at the base of conifer trunks, often pines but also spruce, cedar, larch and others.

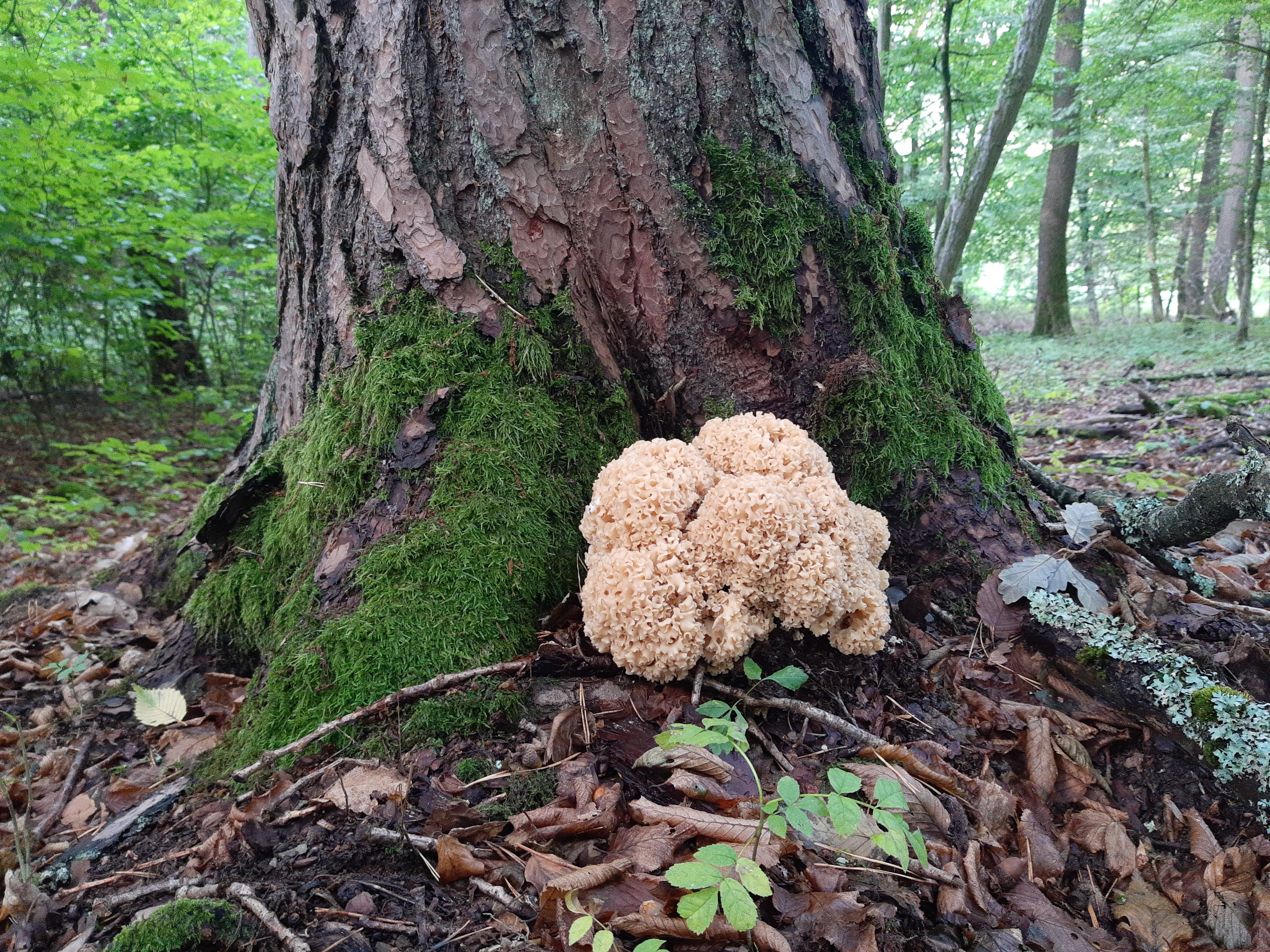
Sparassis crispa growing at the base of a pine tree near Ehrenbach, Germany

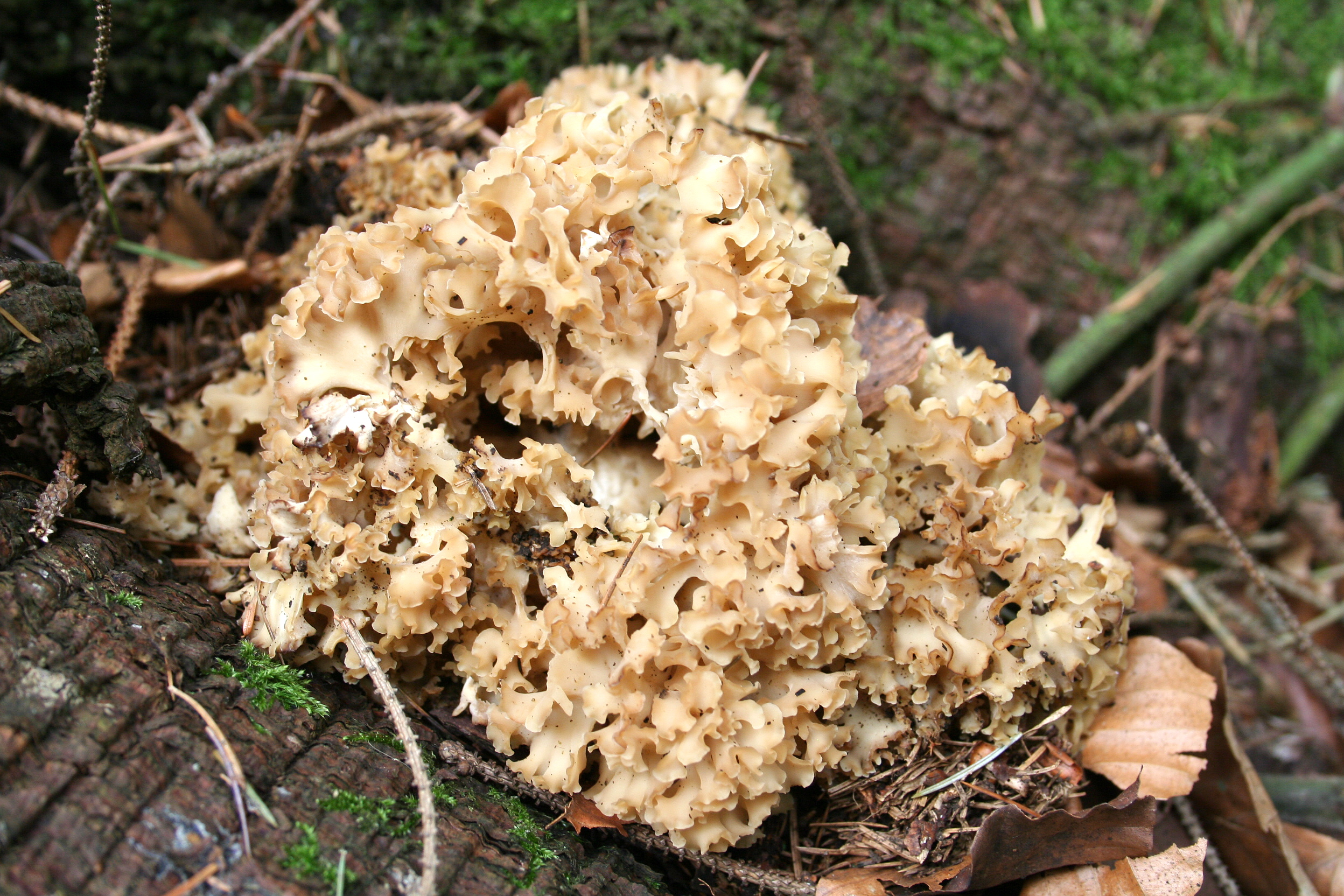
Specimen in Tervuren, Belgium

== Uses ==
It is considered a good edible fungus when young and fresh but is difficult to clean. (A toothbrush and running water are recommended.) One French cookbook, which gives four recipes for this species, says that grubs and pine needles can get caught up in holes in the jumbled mass of flesh. The Sparassis should be blanched in boiling water for 2–3 minutes before being added to the rest of the dish. It should be cooked slowly. It can also be preserved in oil or cold water or by drying. Stored specimens may attract maggots.
