= Largest organisms =

List of largest organisms on Earth

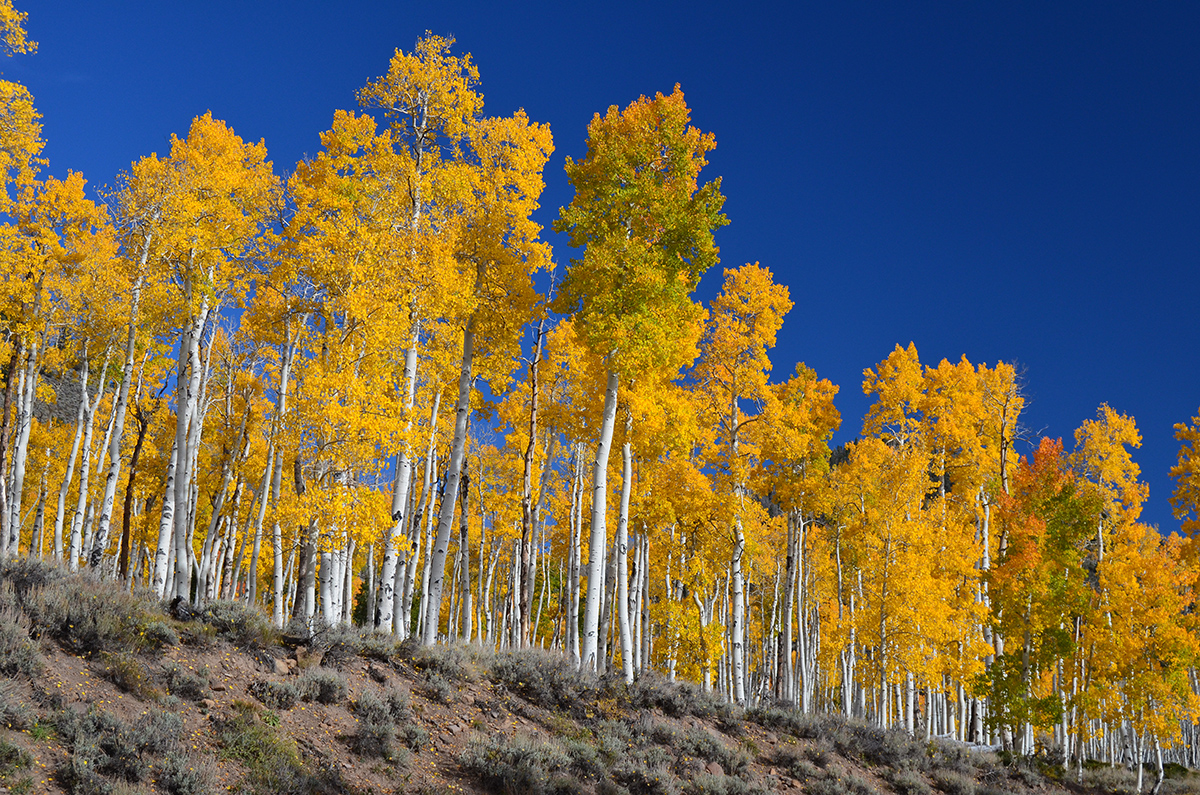
Although it appears to be multiple trees, Pando is a clonal colony of an individual quaking aspen with an interconnected root system. It is widely held to be the world's most massive single organism.

This article lists the largest organisms for various types of life and mostly considers extant species, (Note: The organism sizes listed are frequently considered "outsized" and are not in the normal size range for the respective group.) which found on Earth can be determined according to various aspects of an organism's size, such as: mass, volume, area, length, height, or even genome size. Some organisms group together to form a superorganism (such as ants or bees), but such are not classed as single large organisms. The Great Barrier Reef is the world's largest structure composed of living entities, stretching 2,000 km (1,200 mi) but contains many organisms of many types of species.

When considering singular entities, the largest organisms are clonal colonies which can spread over large areas. Pando, a clonal colony of the quaking aspen tree, is widely considered to be the largest such organism by mass. Even if such colonies are excluded, trees retain their dominance of this listing, with the giant sequoia being the most massive tree. In 2006, a huge clonal colony of the seagrass Posidonia oceanica was discovered south of the island of Ibiza. At 8 kilometres (5 mi) across, and estimated at 100,000 years old, it may be one of the largest and oldest clonal colonies on Earth.

Among animals, all of the largest species are marine mammals, specifically whales. The blue whale is believed to be the largest animal to have ever lived. The living land animal classification is also dominated by mammals, with the African bush elephant being the largest of these.

== Plants ==
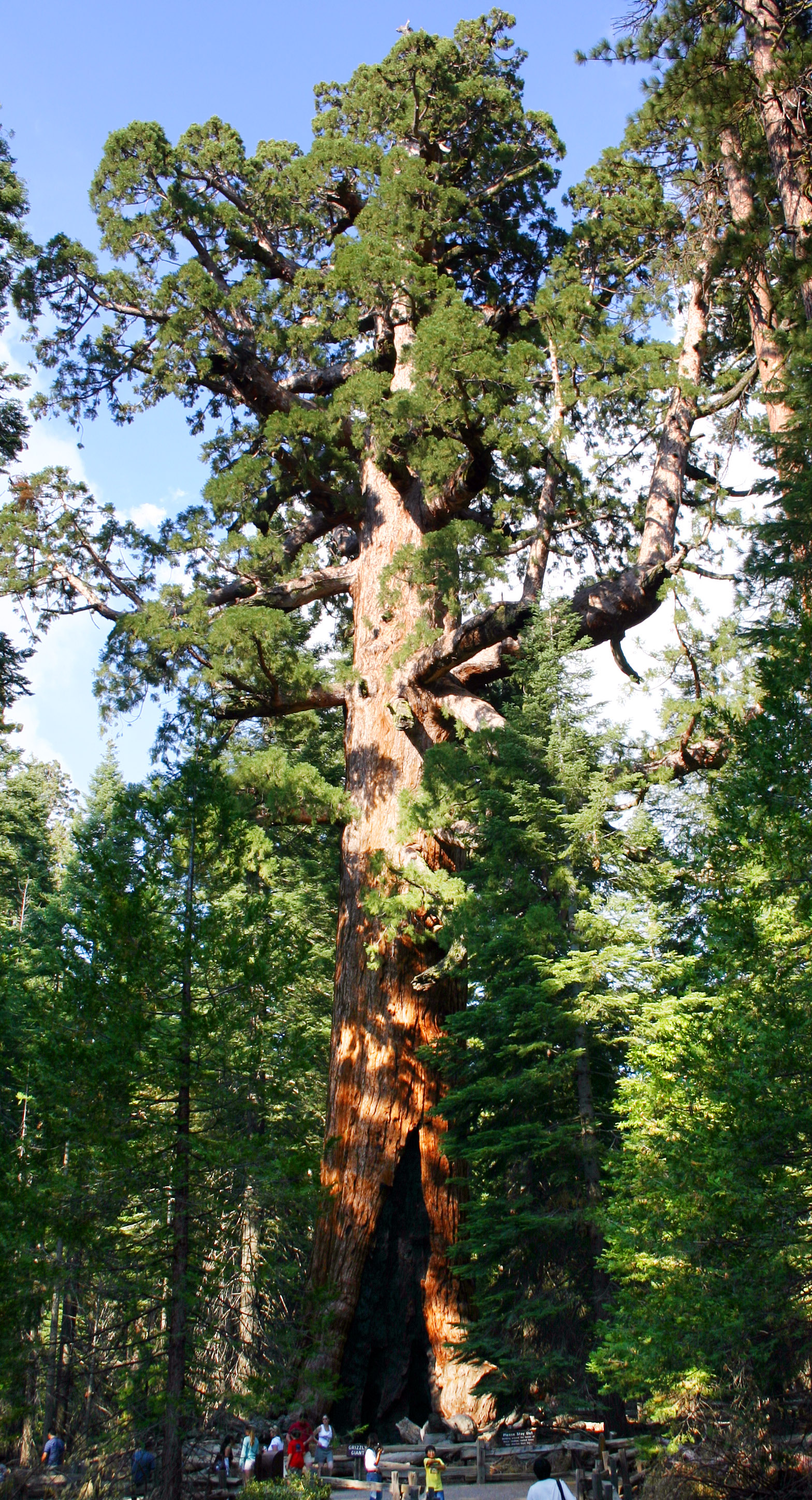
The Giant Sequoia (Grizzly Giant pictured) is the world's most massive tree

The largest single-stem tree by wood volume and mass is the giant sequoia (Sequoiadendron giganteum), native to California's Sierra Nevada; it typically grows to a height of 70–85 m (230–280 ft) and 5–7 m (16–23 ft) in diameter.

The largest organism in the world, according to mass, is the aspen tree whose colonies of clones can grow up to 8 kilometres (5 mi) in size. The largest such colony is Pando, in the Fishlake National Forest in Utah.

A form of flowering plant that far exceeds Pando as the largest organism on Earth in area and potentially also mass, is the giant marine plant, Posidonia australis, living in Shark Bay, Australia. Its length is about 180 km (112 mi) and it covers an area of 200 km^{2} (77 sq mi). It is also among the oldest known clonal plants.

Another giant marine plant of the genus Posidonia, Posidonia oceanica discovered in the Mediterranean near the Balearic Islands, Spain may be the oldest living organism in the world, with an estimated age of 100,000 years.

The largest individual flower in the world is Rafflesia arnoldii, while the flowering plant with the largest unbranched inflorescence in the world is Amorphophallus titanum. Both are native to Sumatra in Indonesia.

=== Green algae ===
Green algae are photosynthetic unicellular and multicellular "green plants" that are related to land plants. The thallus of the unicellular mermaid's wineglass, Acetabularia, can grow to several inches (perhaps 0.1 to 0.2 m) in length. The fronds of the similarly unicellular Caulerpa taxifolia can grow up to a foot (0.3 m) long.

== Animals ==
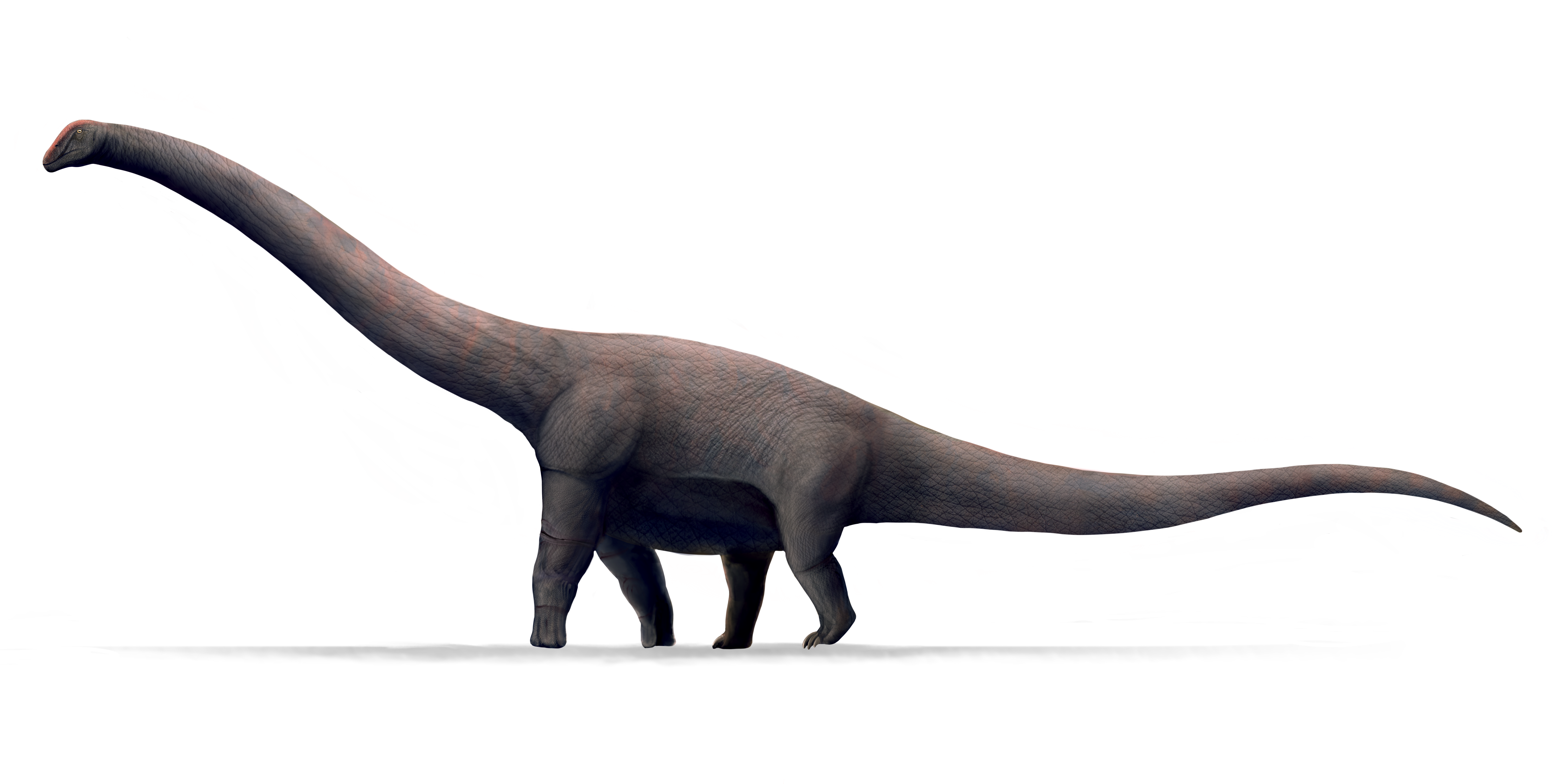
Bruhathkayosaurus is potentially the largest animal to have walked the earth.

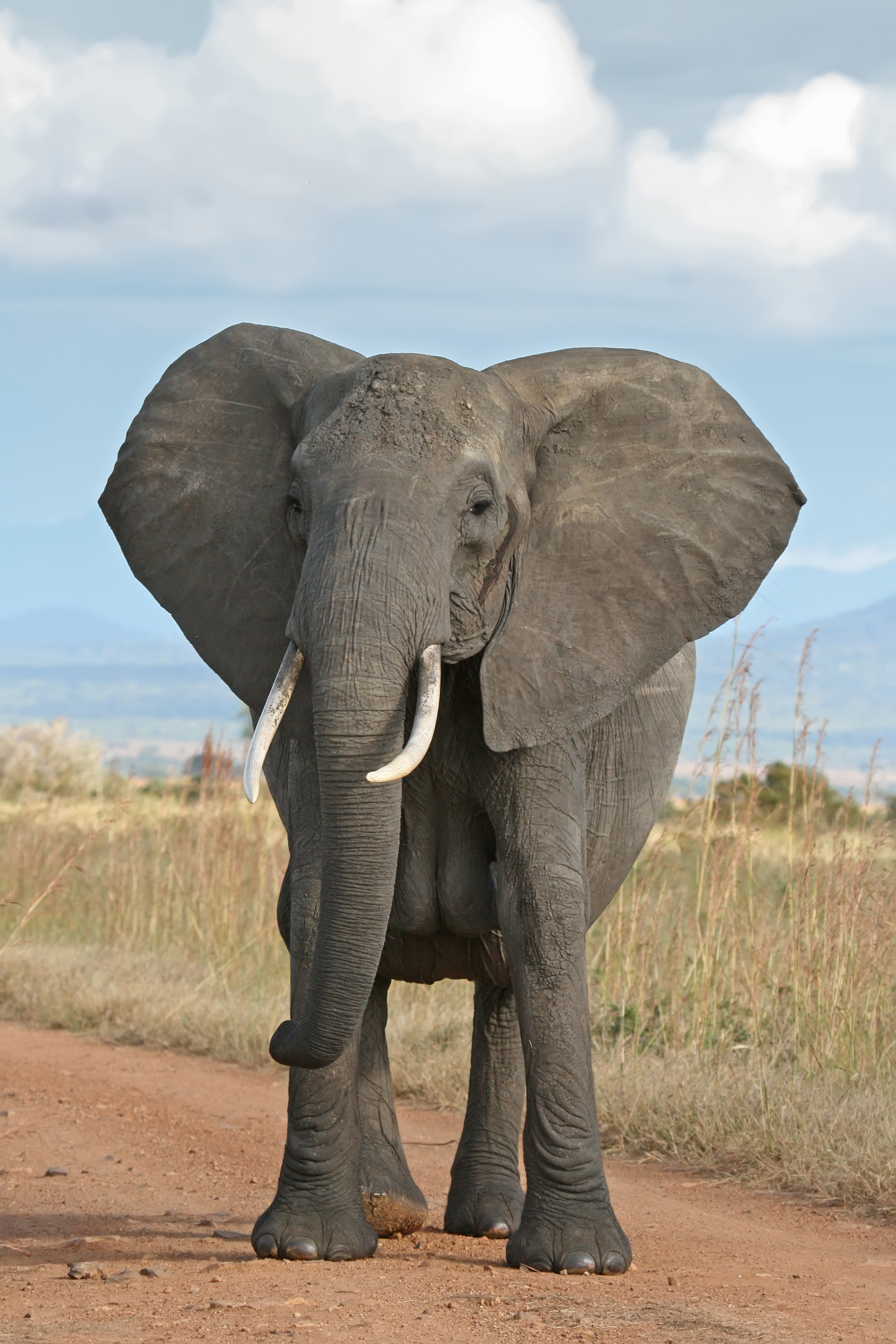
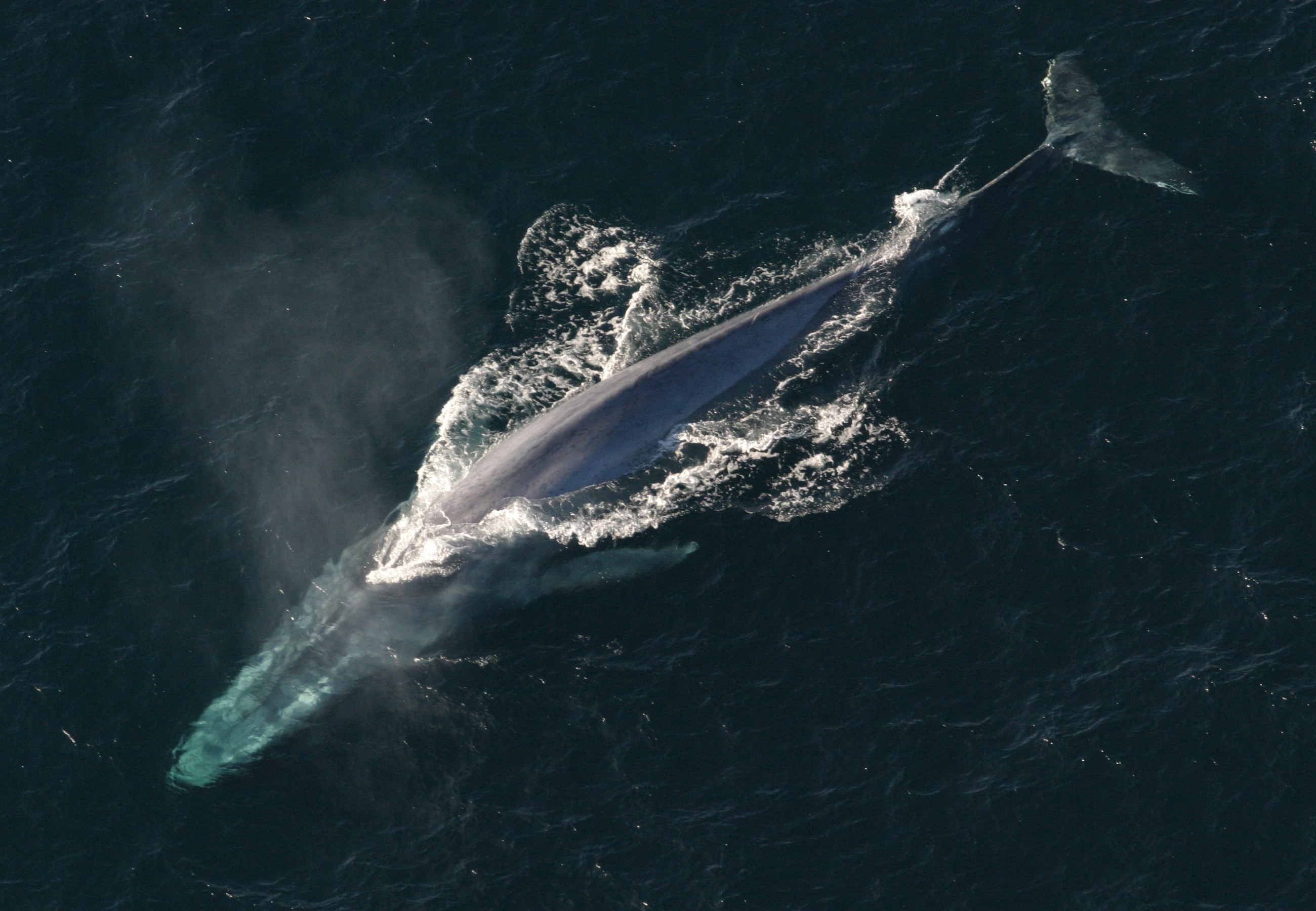
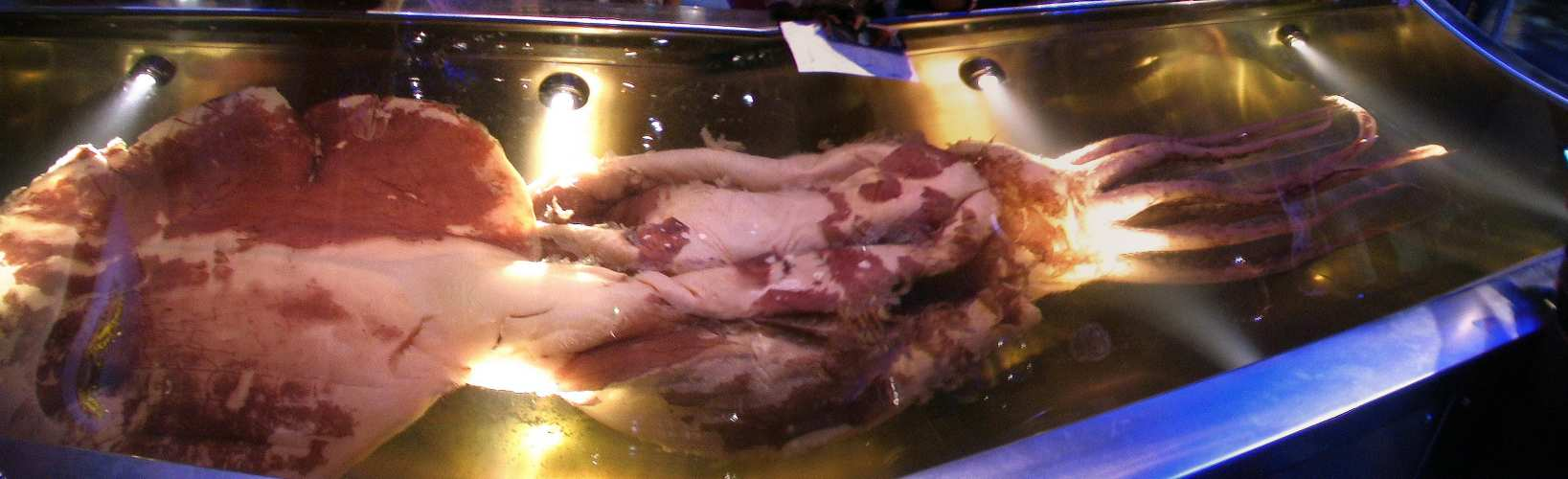
Clockwise from top left: an African bush elephant, the largest extant terrestrial animal; a blue whale, the largest animal ever to exist; and a colossal squid, the largest invertebrate

The largest extant animal, as well as the largest animal to ever exist, is the blue whale. The maximum recorded weight was 190 tonnes for a specimen measuring 27.6 metres (91 ft), whereas longer ones, up to 33.6 metres (110 ft), have been recorded but not weighed. It is estimated that this individual could have a mass of 250 tonnes or more. The longest non-colonial animal is the lion's mane jellyfish (120 ft, 36.6 m).

While controversial, estimates for the weight of the sauropod Bruhathkayosaurus suggest it was around 110–170 tons, with the highest estimate being 240 tons, if scaled with Patagotitan, although actual fossil remains no longer exist, and that estimation is based on described dimensions in 1987. Similarly, the extinct whale Perucetus was initially estimated in 2023 to have a mass of 85 to 340 t (94–375 short tons; 84–335 long tons). However, more recent studies suggest this whale was much smaller than previous estimates, with a 2024 study putting its weight at 60 to 113 tonnes, while a 2025 study further downsized its weight to 35 to 40 tonnes.

In April 2024, Ichthyotitan severnensis was established as a valid shastasaurid taxon and is considered both the largest marine reptile ever discovered and the largest macropredator ever discovered. The Lilstock specimen was estimated to be around 26 metres (85 ft) whilst the Aust specimen was an even more impressive 30 to 35 metres (98 to 115 ft) in length (however, the Aust specimen or 'Aust Colossus' may not belong to Ichthyotitan). While no weight estimates have been made as of yet, Ichthyotitan would have easily rivalled or surpassed the blue whale. The upper estimates of weight for these prehistoric animals would have easily rivaled or exceeded the largest rorquals and sauropods. However, an as-yet undescribed shastasaurid, informally referred to as 'Aust Colossus', may have exceeded Ichthyotitan in size, potentially making it the largest known marine reptile. It has been estimated at approximately 30 metres in length, which would surpass the blue whale; however, the authors note that this estimate is highly speculative.

The African bush elephant (Loxodonta africana) is the largest living land animal. A native of various open habitats in sub-Saharan Africa, males weigh about 6 tonnes (13,000 lb) on average. The largest elephant ever recorded was shot in Angola in 1974. It was a male measuring 10.67 metres (35.0 ft) from trunk to tail and 4.17 metres (13.7 ft) lying on its side in a projected line from the highest point of the shoulder, to the base of the forefoot, indicating a standing shoulder height of 3.96 metres (13.0 ft). This male had a computed weight of 10.4 to 12.25 tonnes.

== Fungi ==
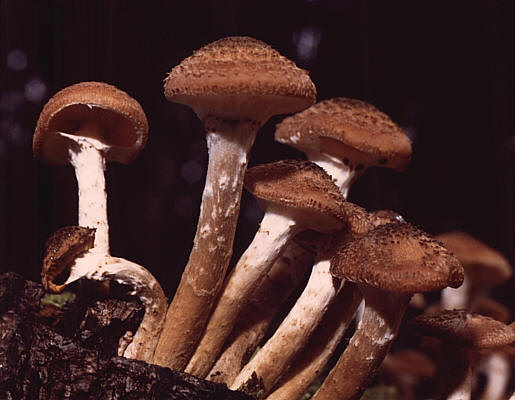
Armillaria ostoyae

The largest living fungus may be a honey fungus of the species Armillaria ostoyae. A mushroom of this type in the Malheur National Forest in the Blue Mountains of eastern Oregon, U.S. was found to be the largest fungal colony in the world, spanning 8.9 km^{2} (3.4 sq mi) of area and possibly weighing as much as 35,000 tons. This organism is estimated to be 2,400 years old. The fungus was written about in the April 2003 issue of the Canadian Journal of Forest Research. It is not known, however, whether it is a single organism with all parts of the mycelium connected.

A spatial genetic analysis estimated that a specimen of Armillaria ostoyae growing over 91 acres (37 ha) in northern Michigan, United States weighs 440 tons (4 × 10^{5} kg).

In Armillaria ostoyae, each individual mushroom (the fruiting body, similar to a flower on a plant) has only a 5 cm (2.0 in) stipe, and a pileus up to 12.5 cm (4.9 in) across. There are many other fungi which produce a larger individual size mushroom. The largest known fruiting body of a fungus is a specimen of Phellinus ellipsoideus (formerly Fomitiporia ellipsoidea) found on Hainan Island. The fruiting body masses up to 500 kg (1,100 lb).

Until P. ellipsoideus replaced it, the largest known individual fruit body came from Rigidoporus ulmarius. R. ulmarius can grow up to 284 kg (626 lb), 1.66 m (5.4 ft) tall, 1.46 m (4.8 ft) across, and has a circumference of up to 4.9 m (16 ft).

=== Lichen ===
Umbilicaria mammulata is among the largest lichens in the world. The thallus of U. mammulata is usually 4 to 15 cm (1.6 to 5.9 in) in diameter, but specimens have been known to reach 63-centimetre (2.07 ft) in the Smoky Mountains of Tennessee.

The longest lichen is Usnea longissima, which may grow to exceed 20 feet (6.1 m) in length.

== Protists ==
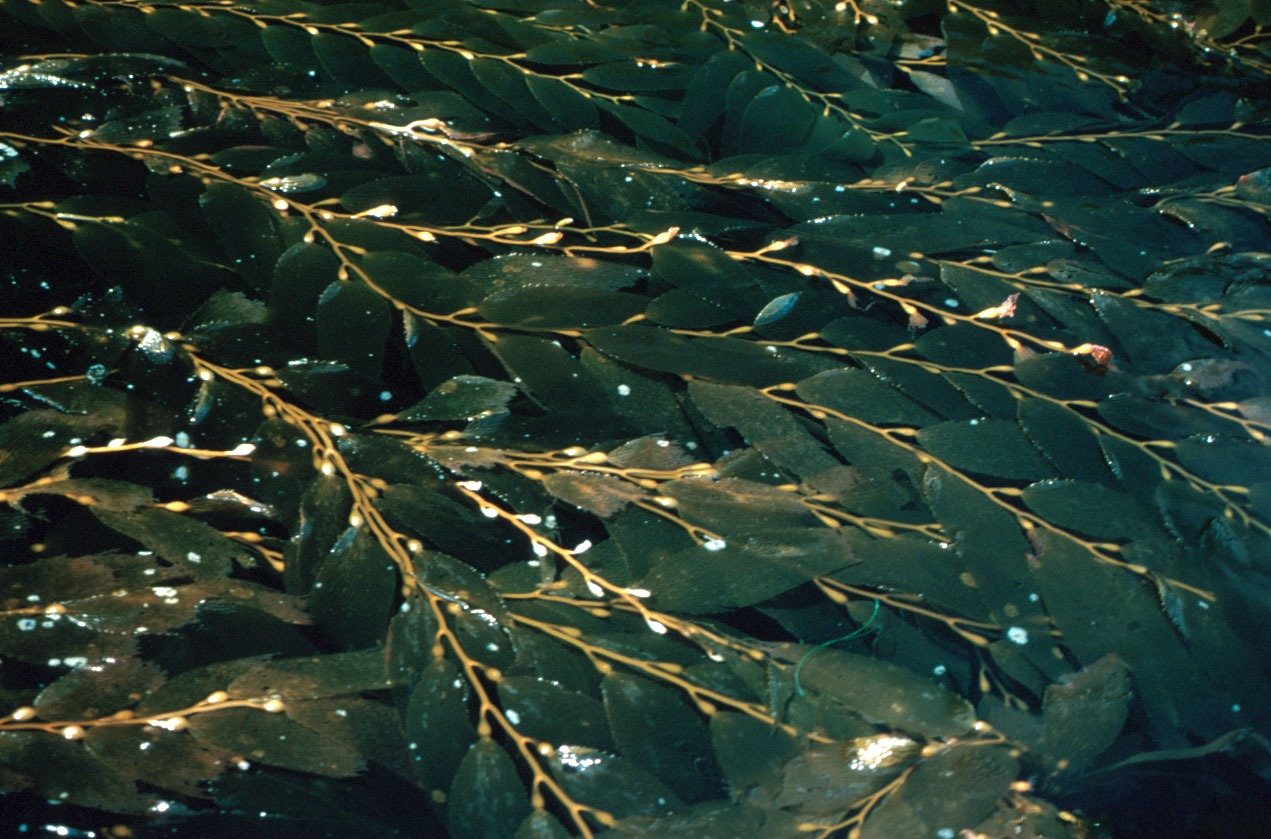
Macrocystis pyrifera, the largest species of giant kelp

(Note: the group Protista is not used in current taxonomy. The taxa listed below are eukaryotes that are neither animals, plants, nor fungi.)

=== Amoebozoans ===
Among the organisms that are not multicellular, the largest are the slime molds, such as Physarum polycephalum, some of which can reach a diameter over 30 cm (12 in). These organisms are unicellular, but they are multinucleate.

=== Discoba ===
Some euglenophytes, such as certain species of Euglena, reach lengths of 400 μm.

=== Rhizarians ===
The largest species traditionally considered protozoa are giant amoeboids like foraminiferans. One such species, the xenophyophore Syringammina fragilissima, can attain a size of 20 cm (7.9 in).

===== Heliozoa =====
As of 2021, the largest known heliozoan is Berkeleyaesol magnus (formerly Raphidiophrys magna): its axopodial sphere can reach a diameter up to 6350 μm (6.35 mm), with a cell body diameter of 1486 μm, a mucilaginous envelope 540 μm thick, and up to 1892 μm long axopodia.

=== Alveolates ===
The largest ciliates, such as Spirostomum, can attain a length over 4 mm (0.16 in).

=== Stramenopiles ===
The largest stramenopiles are giant kelp from the northwestern Pacific. The floating stem of Macrocystis pyrifera can grow to a height of over 45 m (148 ft). Macrocystis also qualifies as the largest brown alga, the largest chromist, and the largest protist generally.

== Bacteria ==
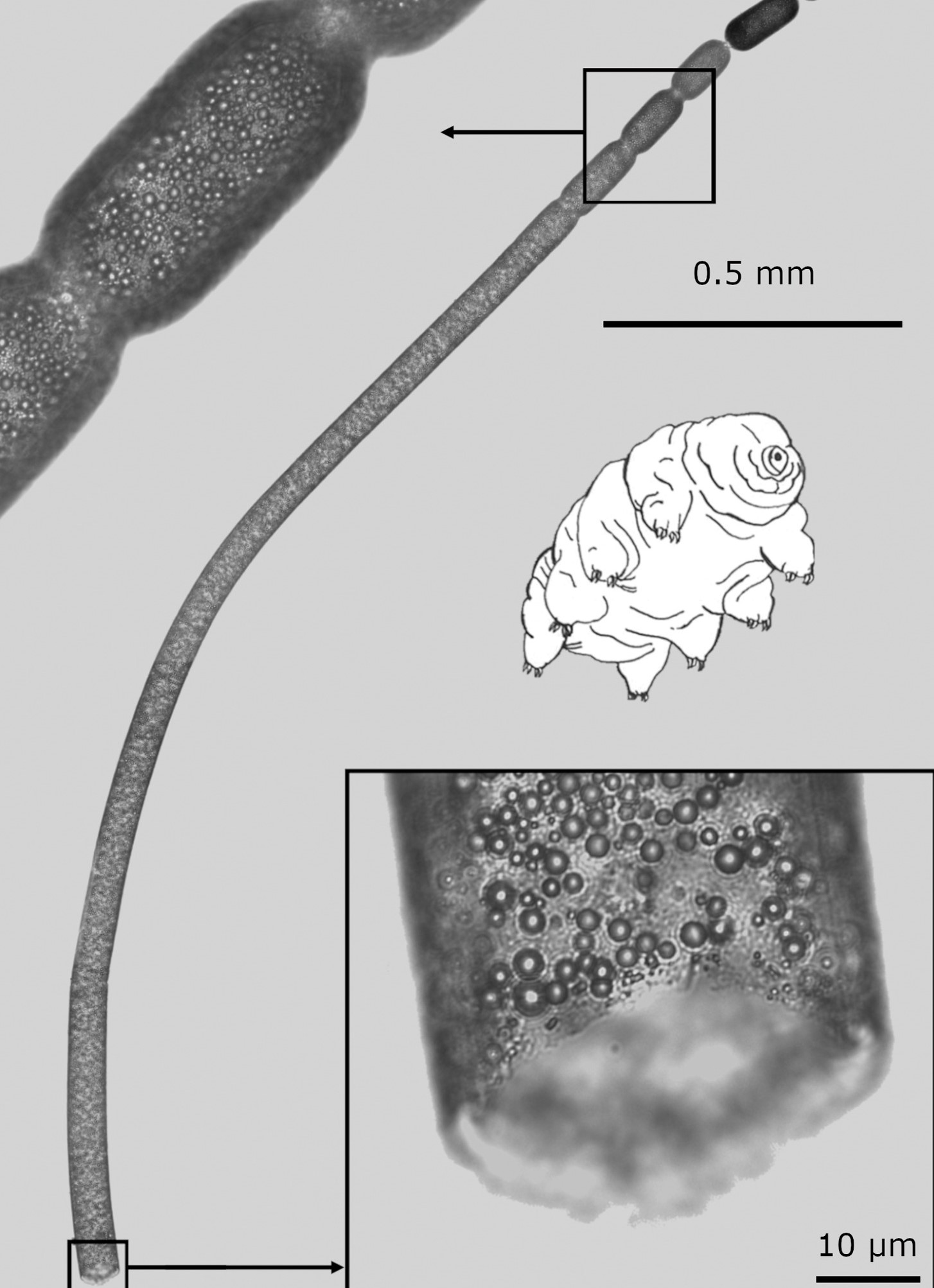
Thiomargarita magnifica with a tardigrade for scale.

The largest known species of bacterium is named Thiomargarita magnifica, which grows to 1 cm (0.39 in) in length, making it visible to the naked eye and also about five thousand times the size of more typical bacteria. BBC News described it as possessing the "size and shape of a human eyelash." Science published a new paper on the bacterium on June 23, 2022. According to a study coauthored by Jean-Marie Volland, a marine biologist and scientist at California's Laboratory for Research in Complex Systems, and an affiliate at the US Department of Energy Joint Genome Institute, T. magnifica can grow up to 2 centimeters long.

- Cyanobacteria

One of the largest "blue green algae" is Lyngbya, whose filamentous cells can be 50 μm wide.

== Archaea ==
The largest reported archaea is Spaphylothermus marinus, with a cell diameter of up to 15 micrometres. Although it typically only achieves a diameter of 0.5–1 micrometres, cells with larger diameter may form when high concentrations of yeast extract are present.

== Viruses ==
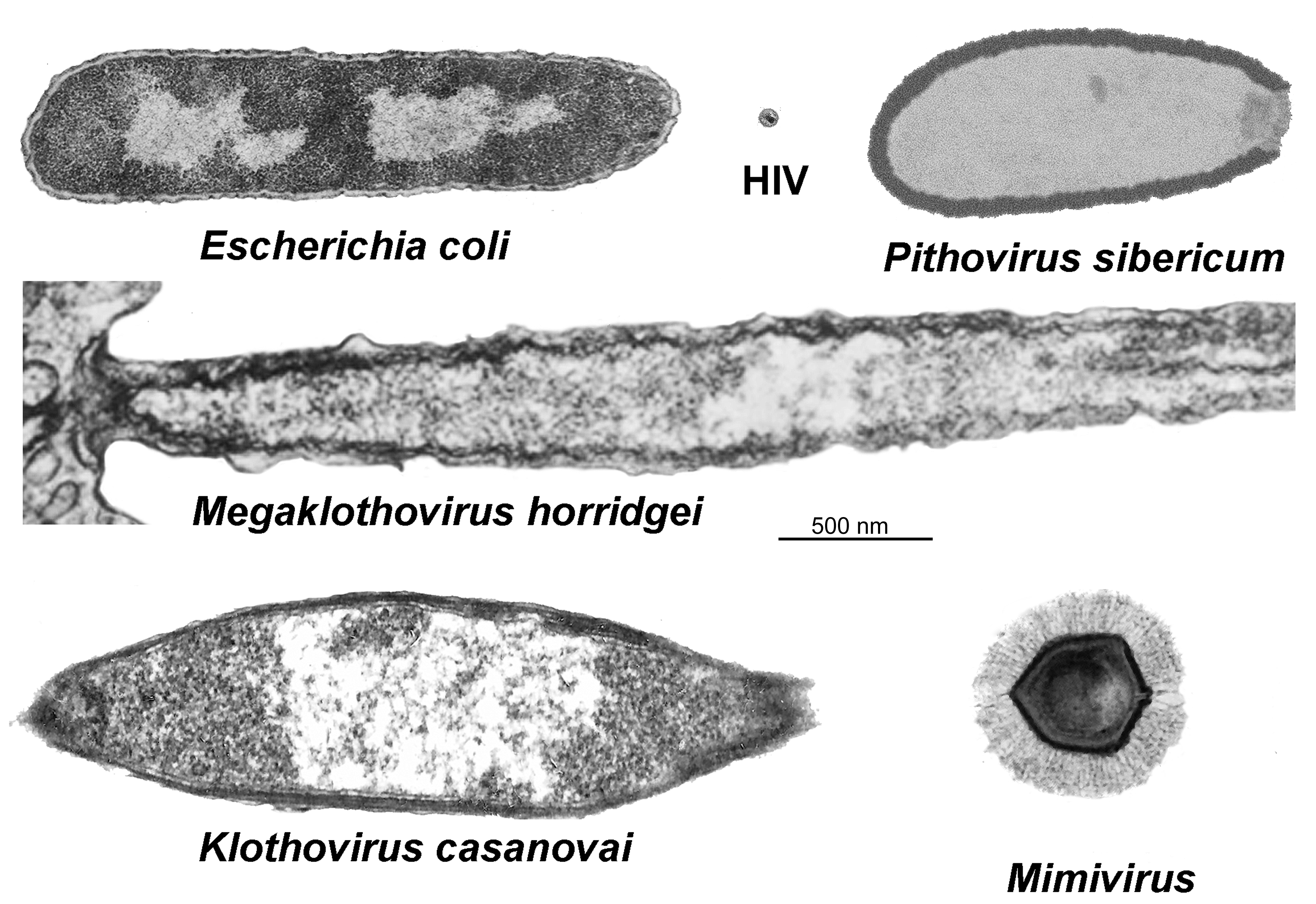
A collection of viruses along with the bacterium E. coli, including M. horridgei – the largest virus

The largest virus on record is Megaklothovirus horridgei, with the length of 3.9 micrometres, comparable to the typical size of a bacterium and large enough to be seen in light microscopes. It was discovered in 2018 (being mistaken for bristles beforehand), having been found on an arrow worm in the genus Spadella. Prior to this discovery, the largest virus was the peculiar virus genus Pandoravirus, which have a size of approximately 1 micrometer and whose genome contains 1,900,000 to 2,500,000 base pairs of DNA.

Pandoravirus infects amoebas specifically, however Megaklothovirus infects Spadella arrow worms.

== See also ==
- Charismatic megafauna
- Deep-sea gigantism
- Genome size
- Island gigantism
- Largest body parts
- Largest prehistoric animals
- List of longest-living organisms
- List of heaviest land mammals
- List of world records held by plants
- List of largest inflorescences
- Lists of organisms by population
- Megafauna
- Smallest organisms
- Superorganism
