= Quercus asymmetrica =

Conservation status
- Endangered (IUCN 3.1)

Scientific classification
- Kingdom: Plantae
- Clade: Embryophytes
- Clade: Tracheophytes
- Clade: Spermatophytes
- Clade: Angiosperms
- Clade: Eudicots
- Clade: Rosids
- Order: Fagales
- Family: Fagaceae
- Genus: Quercus
- Subgenus: Quercus subg. Cerris
- Section: Quercus sect. Cyclobalanopsis
- Species: Q. asymmetrica

Binomial name
- Quercus asymmetrica Hickel & A.Camus

Synonyms
- Cyclobalanopsis patelliformis (Chun) Y.C.Hsu & H.Wei Jen; Quercus patelliformis Chun

Species of oak tree

Quercus asymmetrica is an oak tree species in the beech family Fagaceae. It is found in China (specifically, Guangxi Province and Hainan Province, where it is called 托盘青冈 tuo pan qing gang) and northern Vietnam. It is placed in subgenus Cerris, section Cyclobalanopsis.

== Description ==
Quercus asymmetrica is a tree growing up to 15 m tall, with branchlets that are conspicuously angular when young; by second year, they become glabrous with occasional lenticels. The leaves are leathery, elliptic to ovate-lanceolate, 50-120 × 25–60 mm and have 9-11 secondary veins on each side of mid-vein. The acorns are oblate, 25–28 mm in diameter, greyish-brown, with a scar 15–20 mm in diameter, impressed or flat. The cupules are 20–30 mm in diameter. A persistent stylopodium is approximately 40 mm in diameter. In China, flowering is in May–June and acorns may be found in October–November of the following year.
