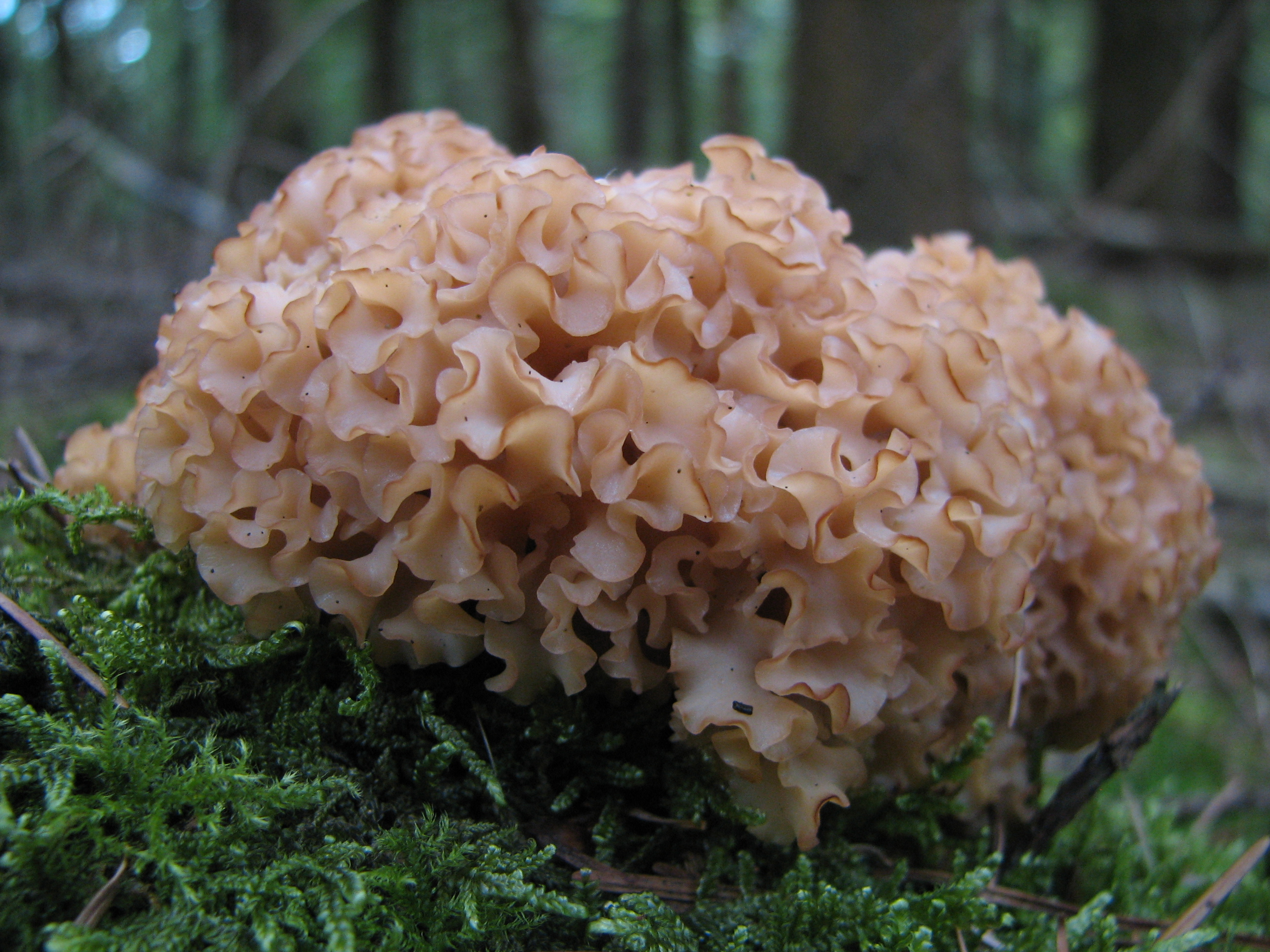
- Sparassis crispa, edible member of the Sparassidaceae

Scientific classification
- Kingdom: Fungi
- Division: Basidiomycota
- Class: Agaricomycetes
- Order: Polyporales
- Family: Sparassidaceae; Herter (1910)

Type genus
- Sparassis Fr. (1819)

Genera
- Sparassiella; Sparassis

= Sparassidaceae =

Family of fungi

The Sparassidaceae are a family of fungi in the order Polyporales. The family was circumscribed by German botanist Wilhelm Herter in 1910 to contain the genus Sparassis. Sparassiella was added to the family in 1964. As of April 2018, Index Fungorum accepts 10 species in the Sparassidaceae.

== Description ==
The fruit bodies of Sparassidaceae fungi consist of branched, fan-shaped segments that originate from a central core. The hyphal system is monomitic, with gloeoplerous hyphae (containing oil droplets). These hyphae have scattered clamp connections. The spores are smooth, thin- to somewhat thick-walled, and hyaline (translucent). Cystidia are mostly absent from the hymenium. Sparassidaceae fungi cause brown rot.
