= Sporocarp (fungus) =

Fungal structure on which spore-producing structures are borne

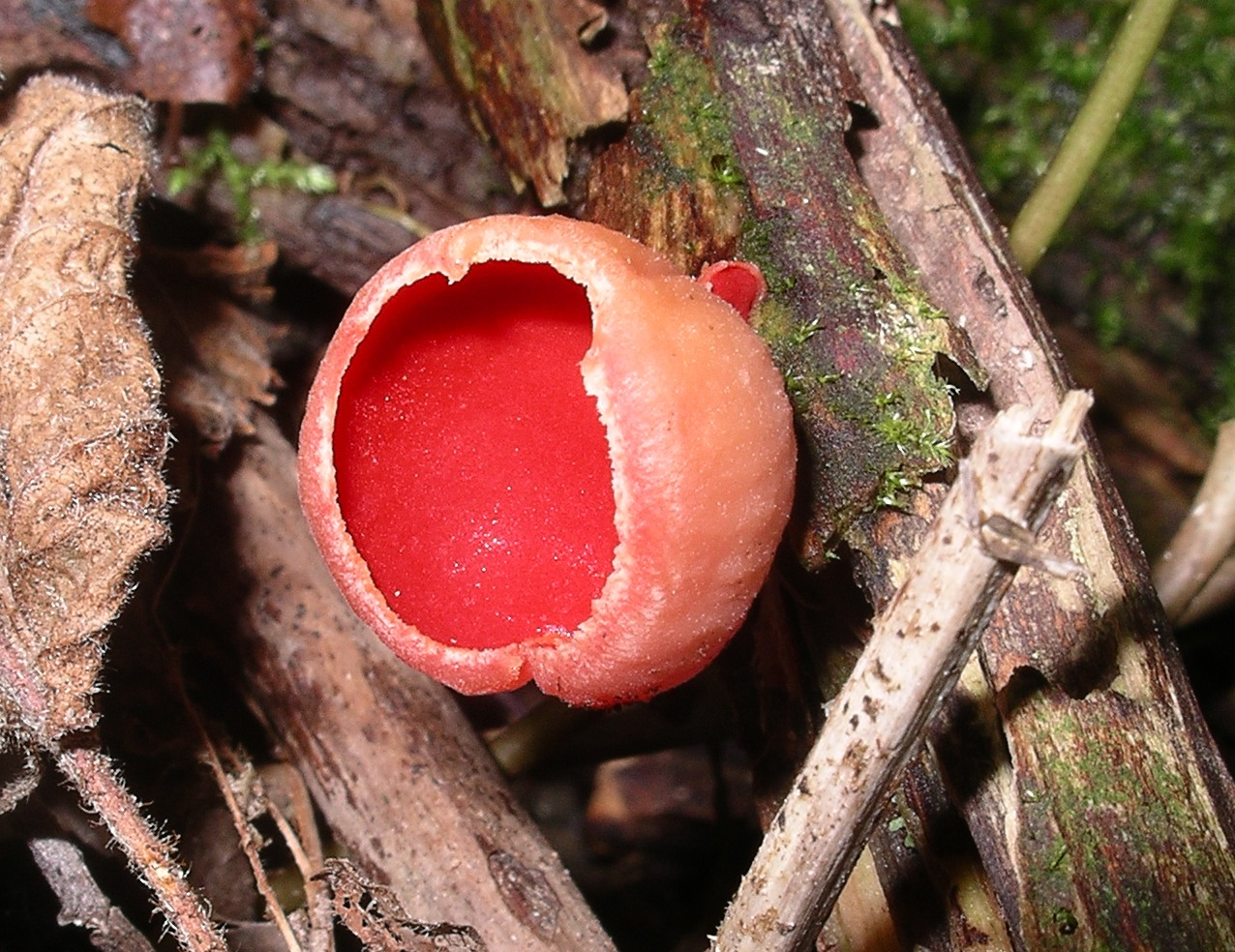
Ascocarp of Sarcoscypha austriaca

The sporocarp (also known as fruiting body, fruit body or fruitbody) of fungi is a multicellular structure on which spore-producing structures, such as basidia or asci, are borne. The fruitbody is part of the sexual phase of a fungal life cycle, while the rest of the life cycle is characterized by vegetative mycelial growth and asexual spore production.

The sporocarp of a basidiomycete is known as a basidiocarp or basidiome, while the fruitbody of an ascomycete is known as an ascocarp. Many shapes and morphologies are found in both basidiocarps and ascocarps; these features play an important role in the identification and taxonomy of fungi.

Fruitbodies are termed epigeous if they grow on the ground, while those that grow underground are hypogeous. Epigeous sporocarps that are visible to the naked eye, especially fruitbodies of a more or less agaricoid morphology, are often called mushrooms. Epigeous sporocarps have mycelia that extend underground far beyond the mother sporocarp. There is a wider distribution of mycelia underground than sporocarps above ground. Hypogeous fungi are usually called truffles or false truffles. There is evidence that hypogeous fungi evolved from epigeous fungi. During their evolution, truffles lost the ability to disperse their spores by air currents, and propagate instead by animal consumption and subsequent defecation.

In amateur mushroom hunting, and to a large degree in academic mycology as well, identification of higher fungi is based on the features of the sporocarp.

The largest known fruitbody is a specimen of Phellinus ellipsoideus (formerly Fomitiporia ellipsoidea) found on Hainan Island, part of China. It measures up to 10.85 metres (35 1/2 feet) in length and is estimated to weigh between 450 and 760 kilograms (990 and 1,680 pounds).

== Ecology ==
A wide variety of animals feed on epigeous and hypogeous fungi. The mammals that feed on fungi are as diverse as fungi themselves and are called mycophages. Squirrels and chipmunks eat the greatest variety of fungi, but there are many other mammals that also forage on fungi, such as marsupials, mice, rats, voles, lemmings, deer, shrews, rabbits, weasels, and more. Some animals feed on fungi opportunistically, while others rely on them as a primary source of food. Hypogeous sporocarps are a highly nutritious primary food source for some small mammals like the Tasmanian bettong. Evidence of this is that the composition of fungi in the diet of Tasmanian bettong was positively correlated with body condition and growth rates of pouch young. Ectomycorrhizal or hypogeous fungi form a symbiotic relationship with small mycophagous mammals. Hypogeous sporocarps depend on small fungivorous mammals to disperse their spores since they are underground and cannot utilize wind dispersal like epigeous sporocarps.

Underground fungi also play a role in a three-way symbiotic relationship with small marsupials and Australian Eucalyptus forests. In Eucalyptus forests, hypogeous sporocarp dispersal is positively affected by fires. After a fire, most if not all epigeous sporocarps are wiped out, leaving hypogeous sporocarps to be the primary source of fungi for small marsupials. The ability of hypogeous fungi to resist disasters, such as fire, could be due to their evolved ability to survive the digestive systems of animals in order to distribute. Sporocarps can also serve as a food source for other fungi.

Sporocarps can be hosts to diverse communities of fungicolous fungi. Short-lived sporocarps are more often hosts to fungicolous fungi than are long-lived sporocarps, which may have evolved more investment in defense mechanisms and tend to have less water content than their short-lived counterparts. Resupinate sporocarps, sporocarps that have a higher surface area to volume ratio, are hosts to a higher diversity of fungicolous fungi than pileate sporocarps are.

Sporocarps of some fungal species have been observed to mark gravesites and sites of corpse decomposition.

== See also ==
- Lamella – the gills
- Sporangium
- Stipe – the stalk
