= Serica sandiegensis =

Scientific classification
- Kingdom: Animalia
- Phylum: Arthropoda
- Clade: Pancrustacea
- Class: Insecta
- Order: Coleoptera
- Suborder: Polyphaga
- Infraorder: Scarabaeiformia
- Family: Scarabaeidae
- Genus: Serica
- Species: S. sandiegensis

Binomial name
- Serica sandiegensis Saylor, 1939

Species of beetle

Serica sandiegensis is a species of beetle of the family Scarabaeidae. It is found in California.

== Description ==
Adults reach a length of about 7.5 mm. They have a piceo-castaneous, elongate body. The dorsal surface is faintly shining and has a very light pruinose bloom. It is glabrous, except for a few scattered hairs on the elytra.

== Life history ==
Adults have been recorded feeding on Adenostoma fasciculatum.
