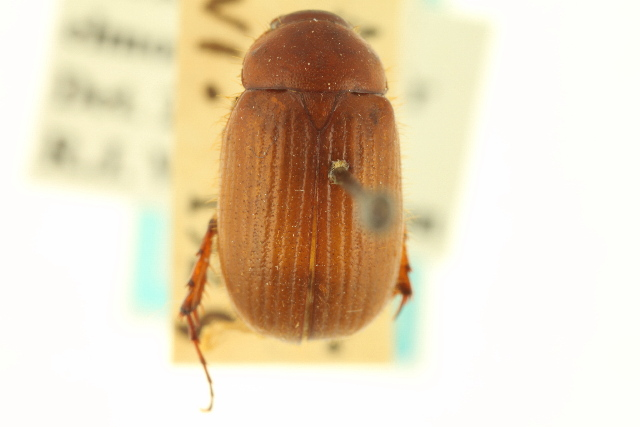

Scientific classification
- Kingdom: Animalia
- Phylum: Arthropoda
- Class: Insecta
- Order: Coleoptera
- Suborder: Polyphaga
- Infraorder: Scarabaeiformia
- Family: Scarabaeidae
- Genus: Serica
- Species: S. elmontea

Binomial name
- Serica elmontea Saylor, 1939

= Serica elmontea =

Species of beetle

Serica elmontea is a species of beetle of the family Scarabaeidae. It is found in the United States (California).

== Description ==
Adults reach a length of about 7.5 mm. They have a dull brunneo-rufous, elongate body. The surface is pruinose and the entire dorsal surface (except for the middle of the front and the clypeus) is covered with short, erect and moderately dense hairs.

== Life history ==
Adults have been recorded feeding on Abies concolor and Adenostoma fasciculatum.
