= Aspergillus californicus =

Scientific classification
- Kingdom: Fungi
- Division: Ascomycota
- Class: Eurotiomycetes
- Order: Eurotiales
- Family: Aspergillaceae
- Genus: Aspergillus
- Species: A. californicus

Binomial name
- Aspergillus californicus Frisvad, Varga & Samson (2011)

Type strain
- IBT 16748, CBS 123895, CBS H-20635, IBT 16748

Species of fungus

Aspergillus californicus is a species of fungus in the genus Aspergillus. It is from the Cavernicolus section. The species was first described in 2011. It has been isolated from the shrub Adenostoma fasciculatum in California, United States.

== Growth and morphology ==
A. californicus has been cultivated on both Czapek yeast extract agar (CYA) plates and Malt Extract Agar Oxoid® (MEAOX) plates. The growth morphology of the colonies can be seen in the pictures below.

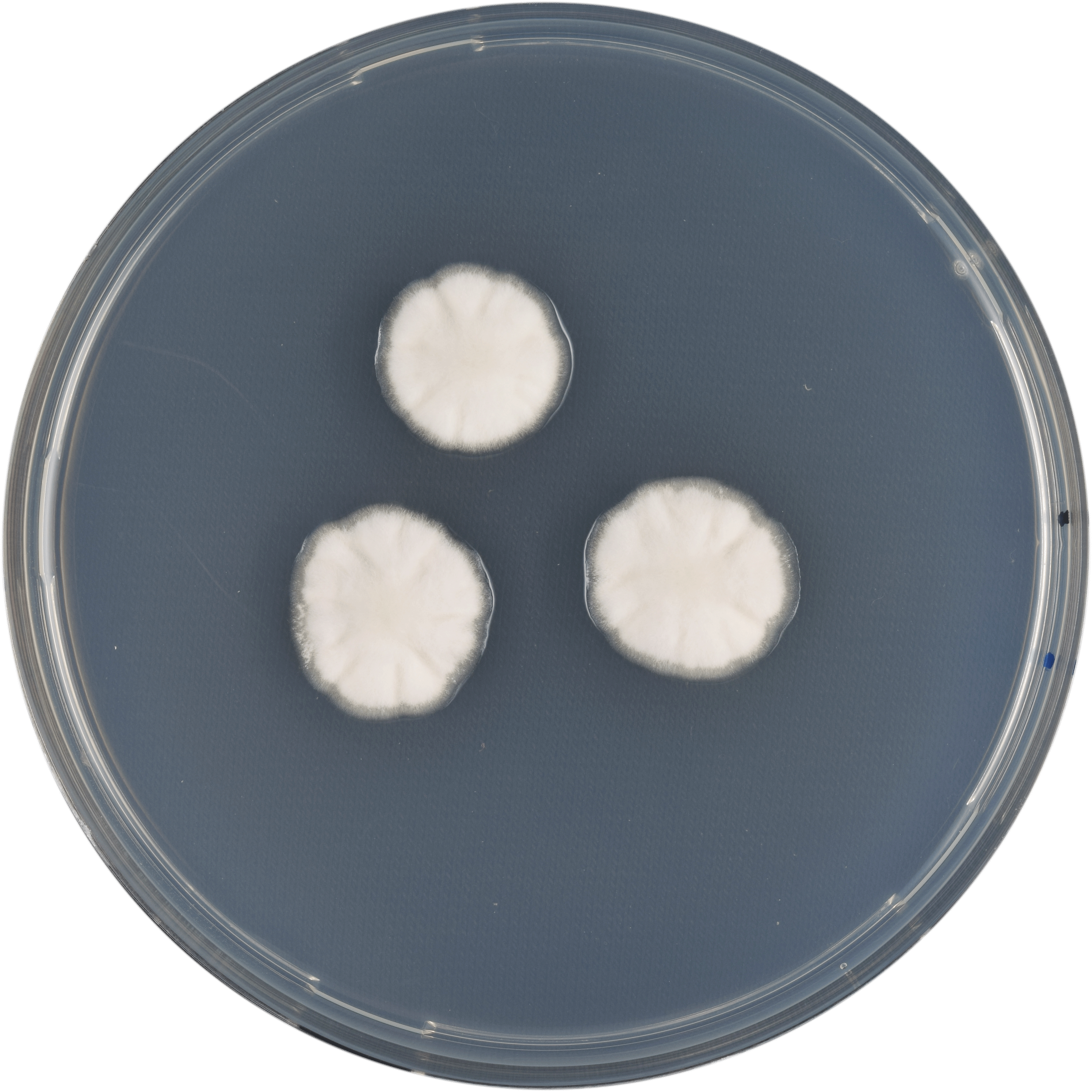
Aspergillus californicus growing on CYA plate

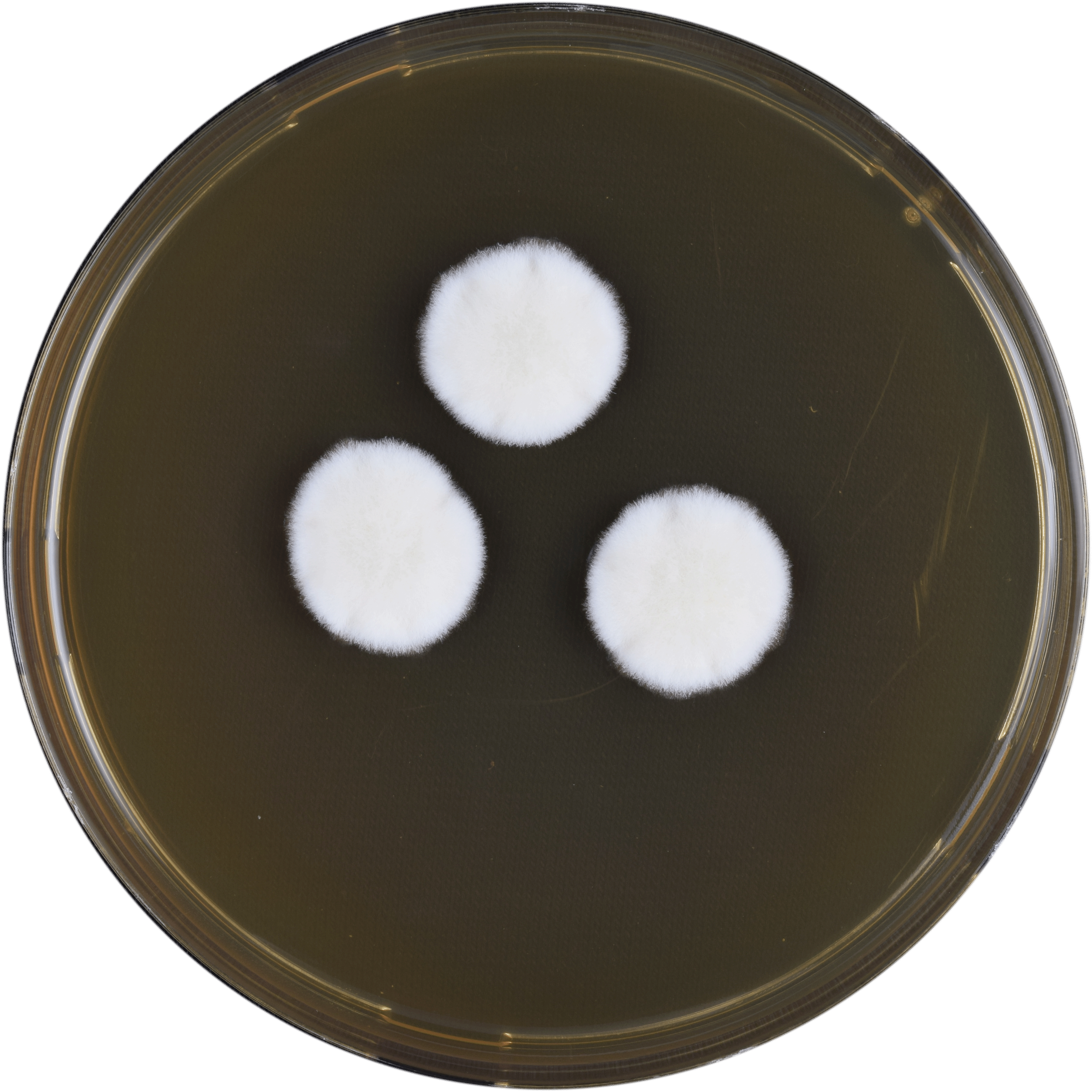
Aspergillus californicus growing on MEAOX plate
