= Sierra de La Asamblea =

Mountain range in Mexico

- Location within Baja California Location within Mexico

Geography
- Location: Baja California, Mexico
- Range coordinates: 29°22′01″N 114°05′20″W

The Sierra de La Asamblea, also referred to as San Luis, Sierra de Yuba, or Sierra de Jubai, is an isolated mountain range in Baja California. The range reaches a height of 1,661 metres, and is separated from southernmost end of the Sierra de San Pedro Martir by over 146 kilometres. This mountain range harbors a large number of disjunct species, including the southernmost distribution of Pinus monophylla, and a large chamise chaparral. The sierra is within a federally designated protected natural area, the Valle de los Cirios.

== Flora ==
Flora of the Sierra de La Asamblea

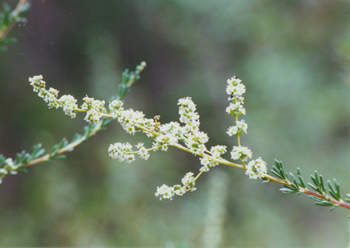
Adenostoma fasciculatum

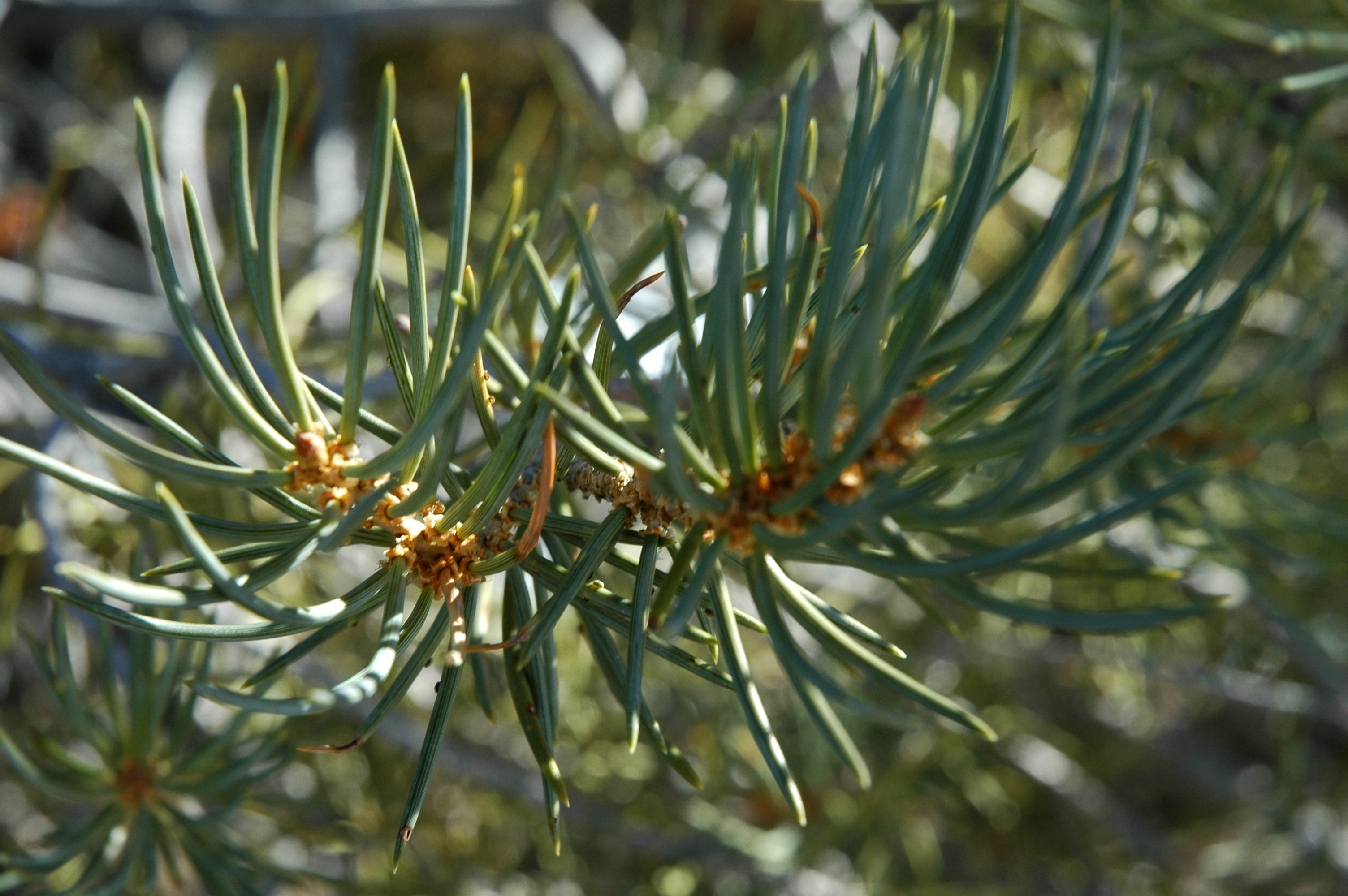
Pinus monophylla

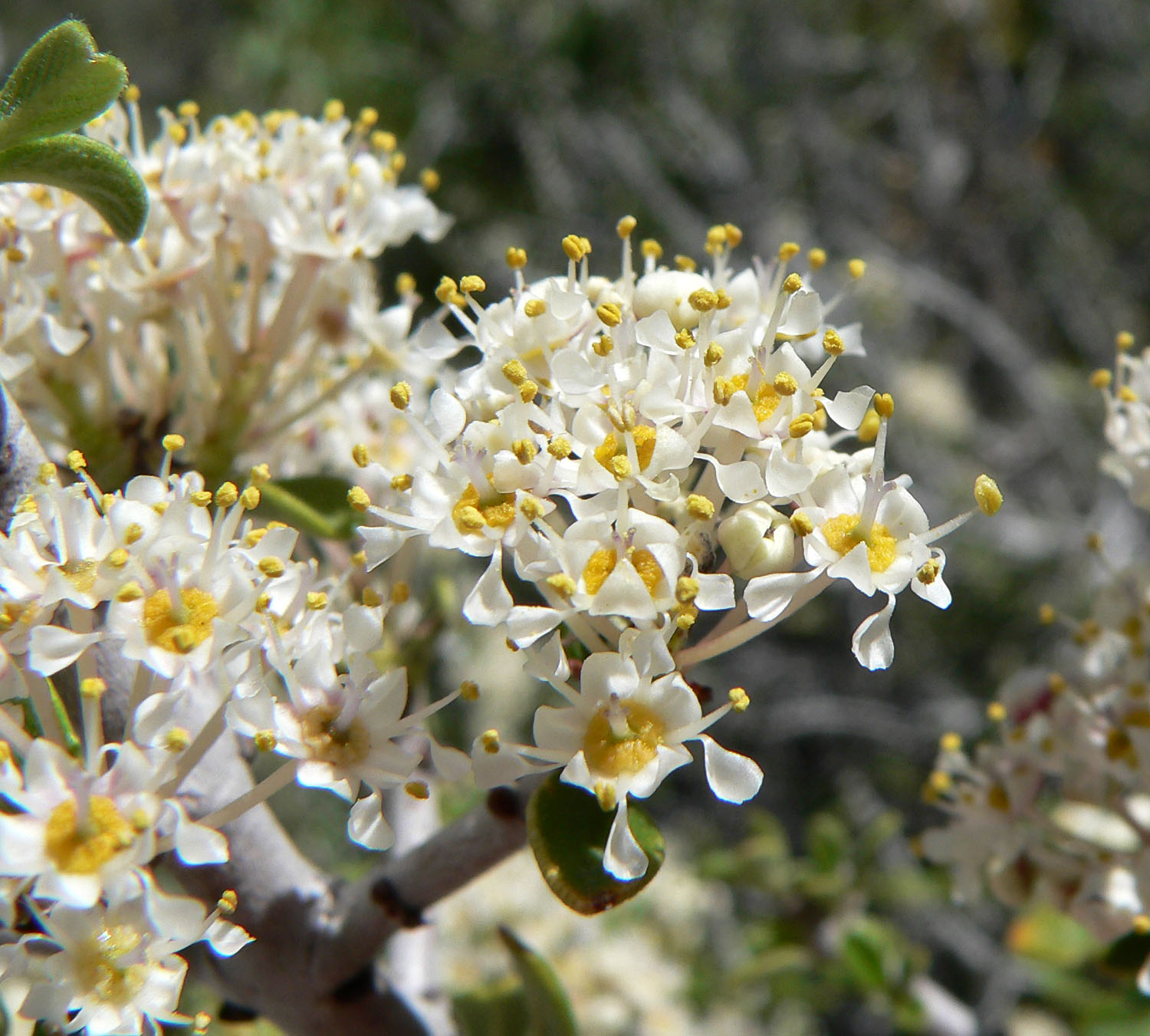
Ceanothus pauciflorus

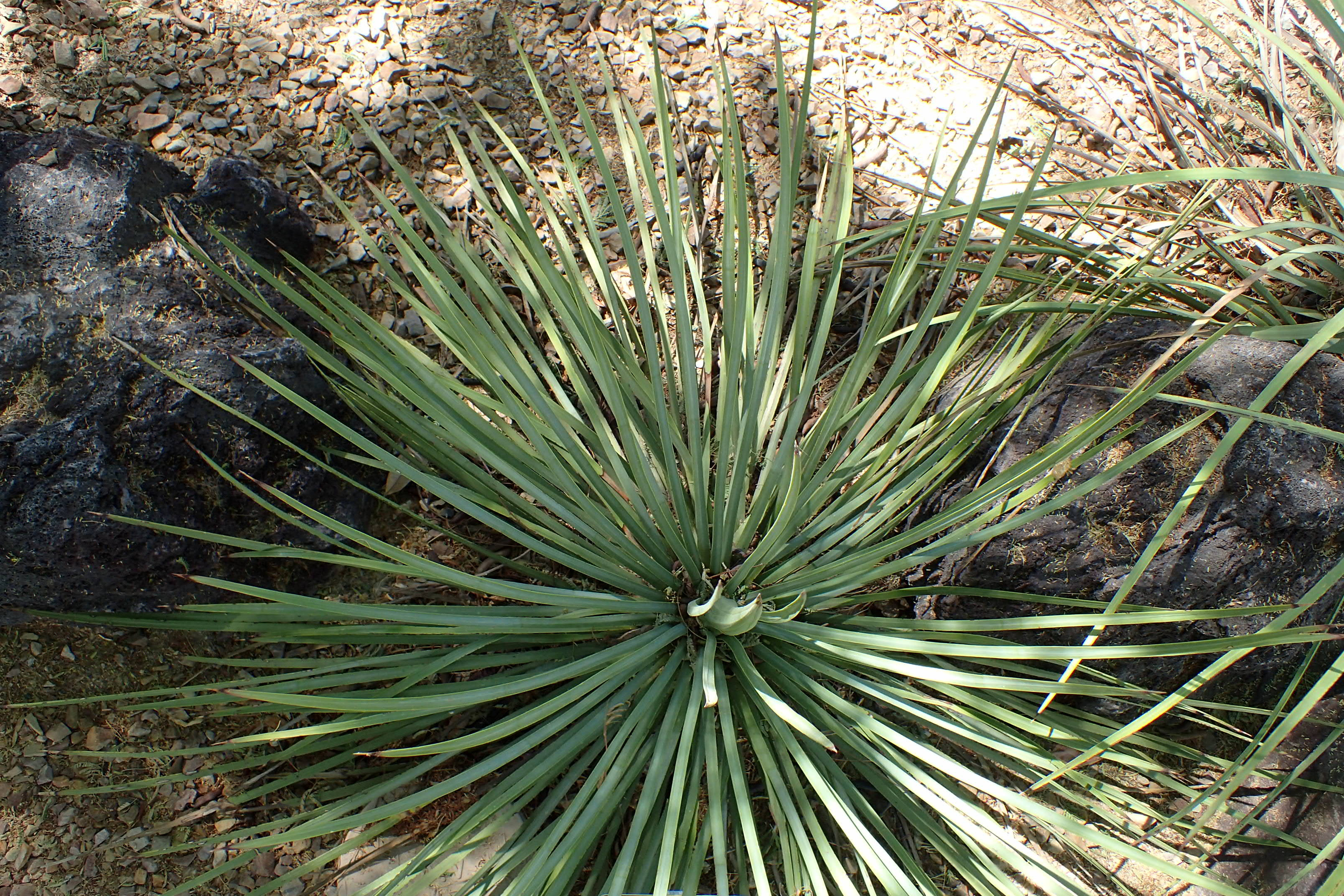
Hesperoyucca whipplei

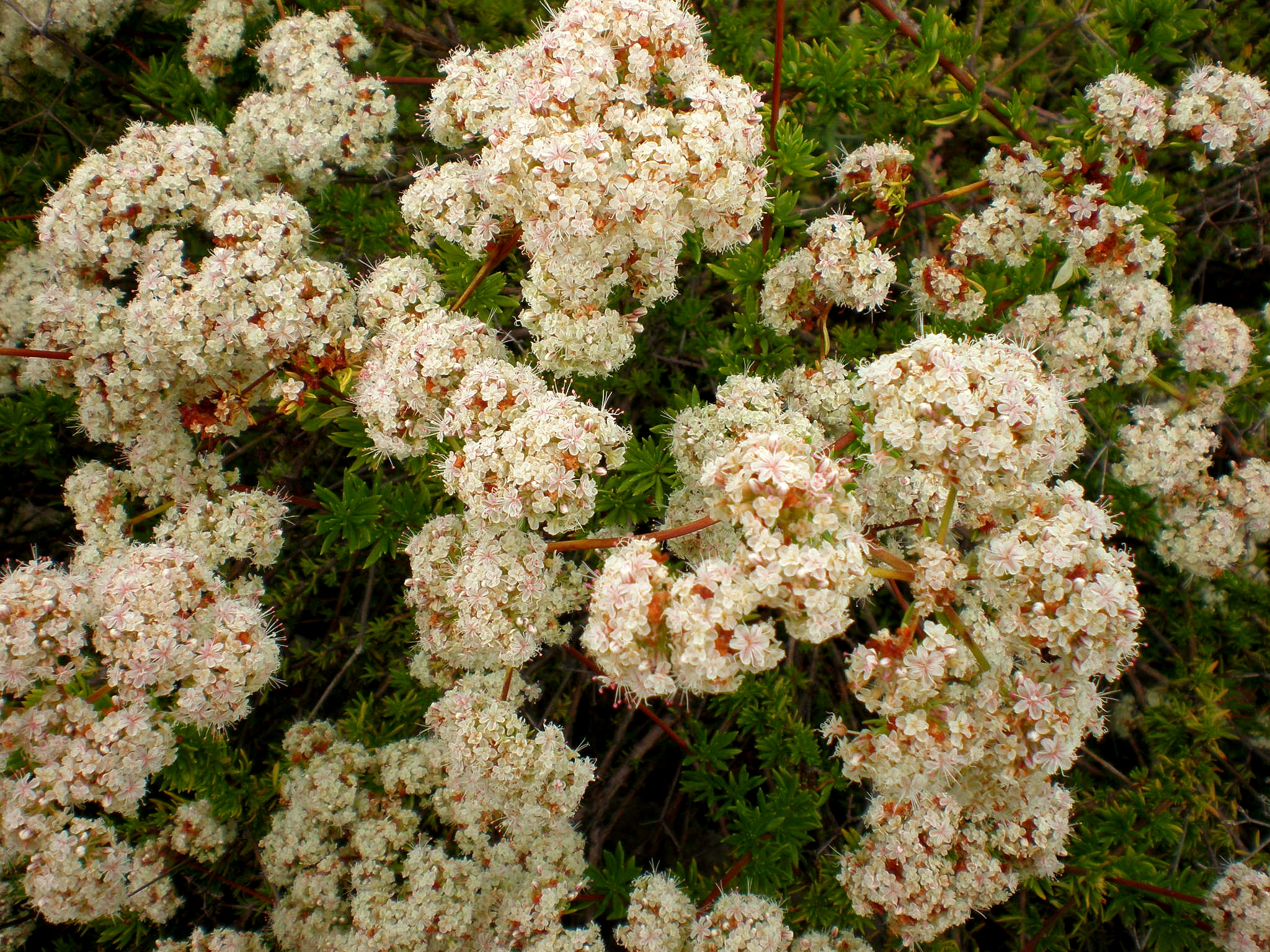
Eriogonum fasciculatum var. flavoviride

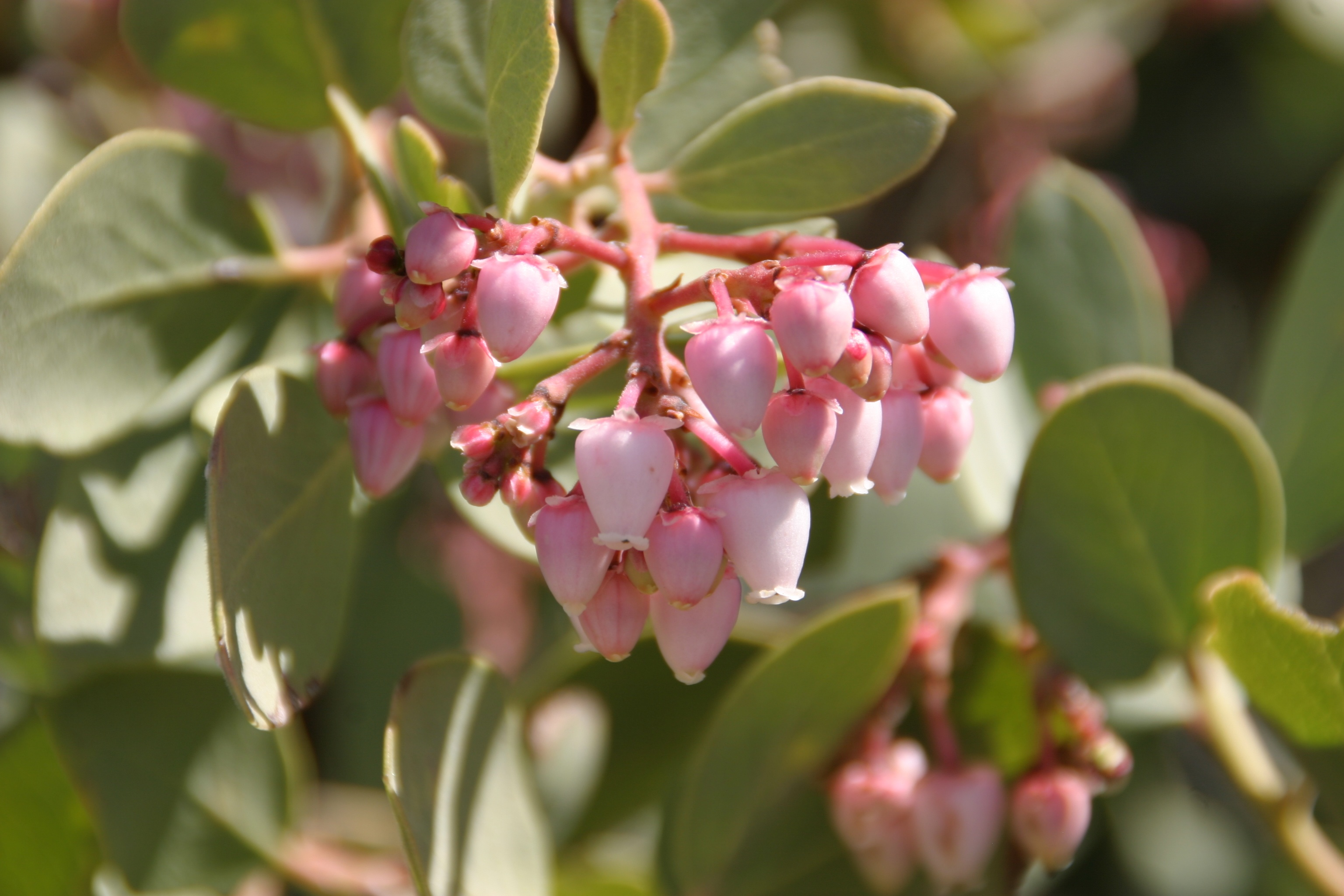
Arctostaphylos glauca

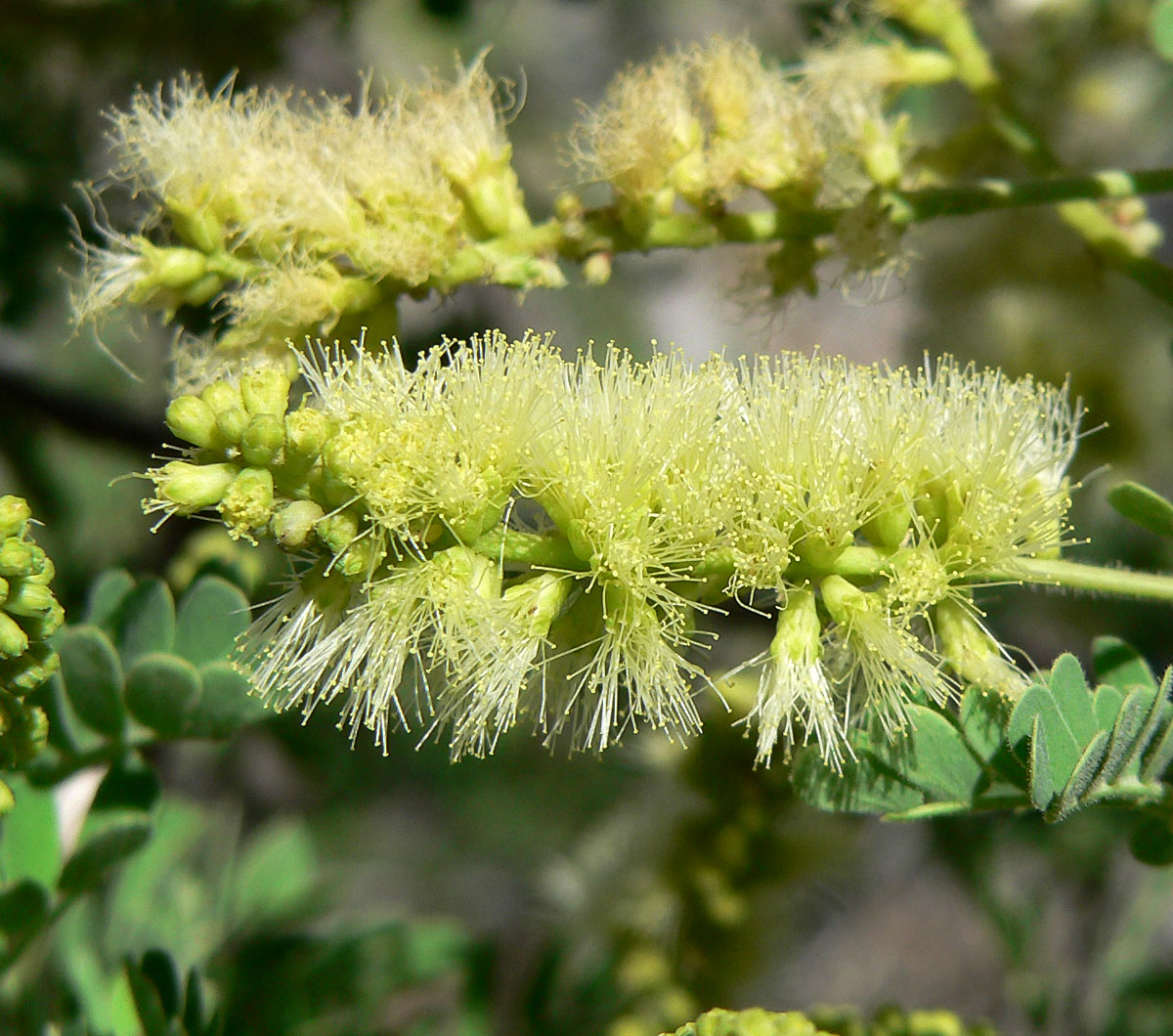
Senegalia greggii

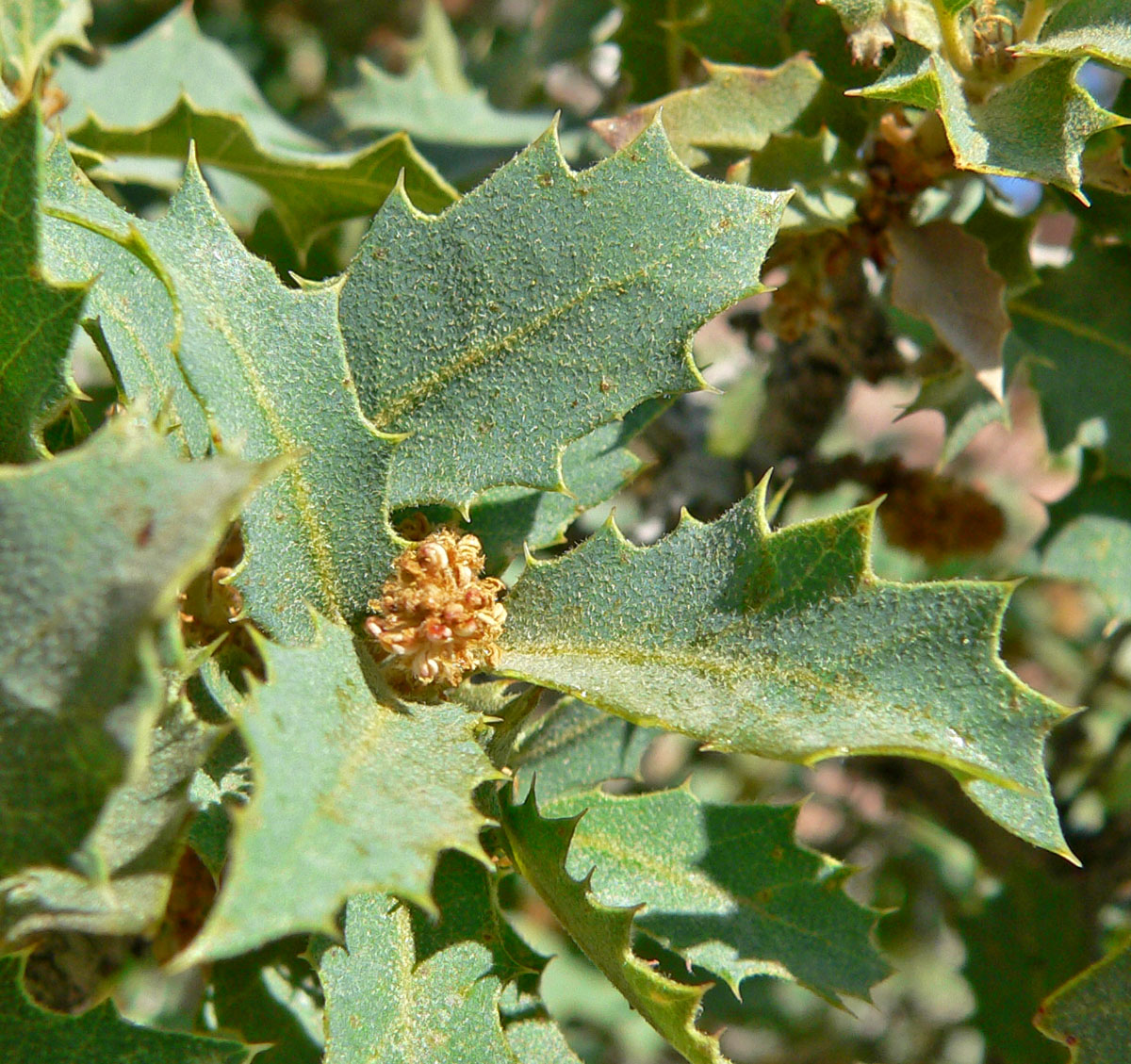
Quercus turbinella

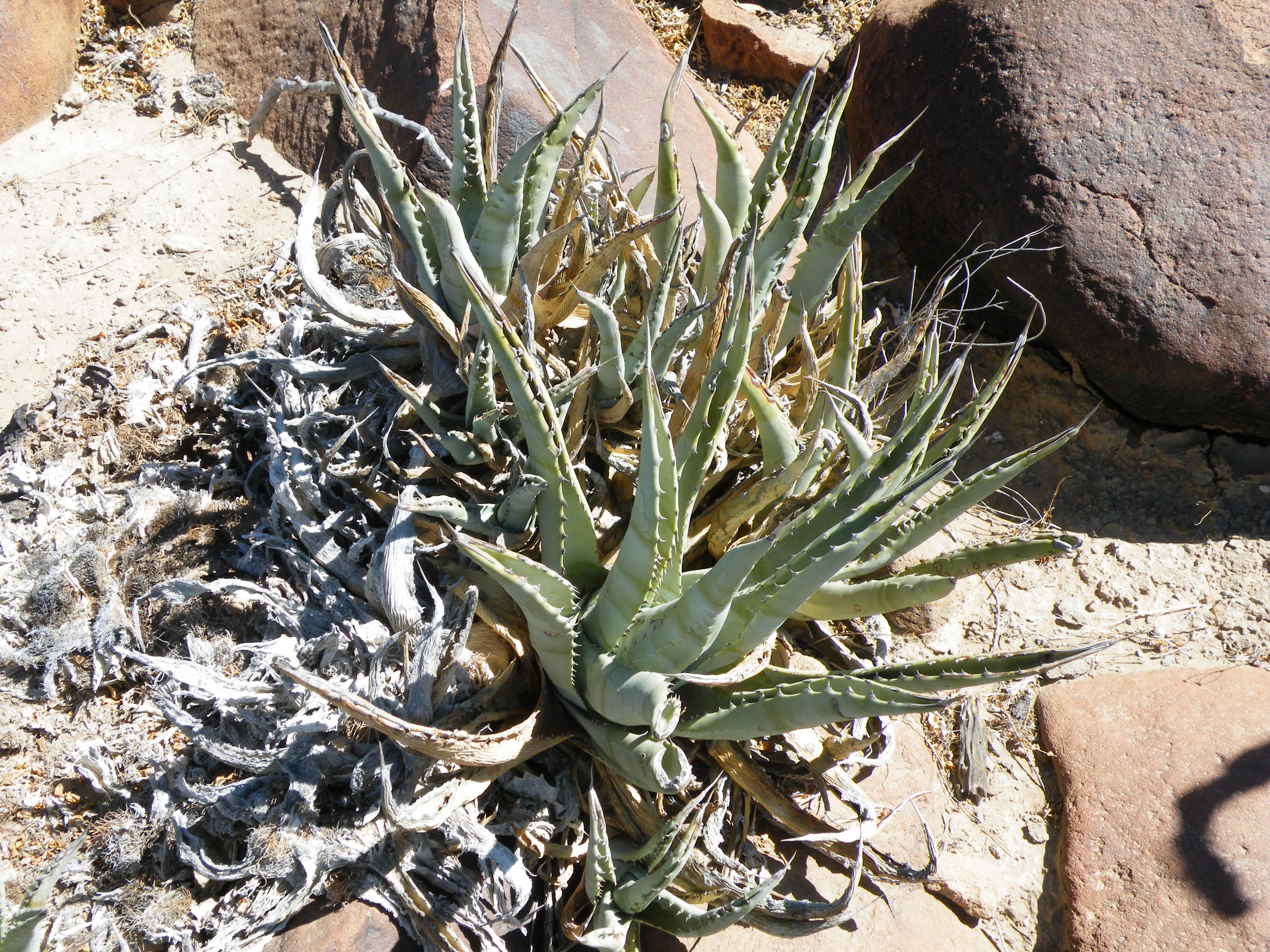
Agave cerulata

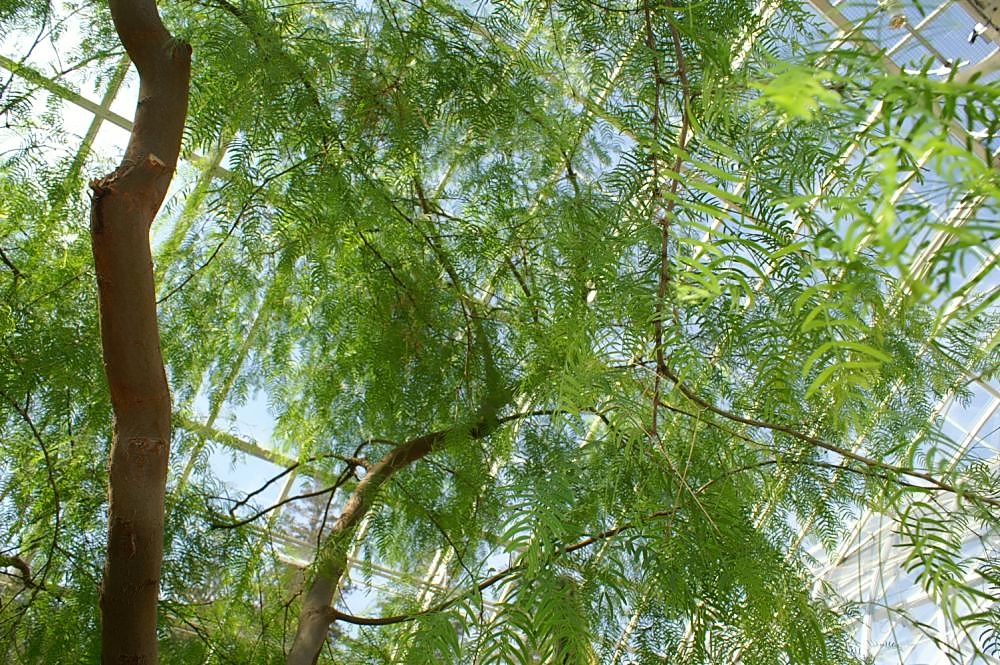
Prosopsis glandulosa

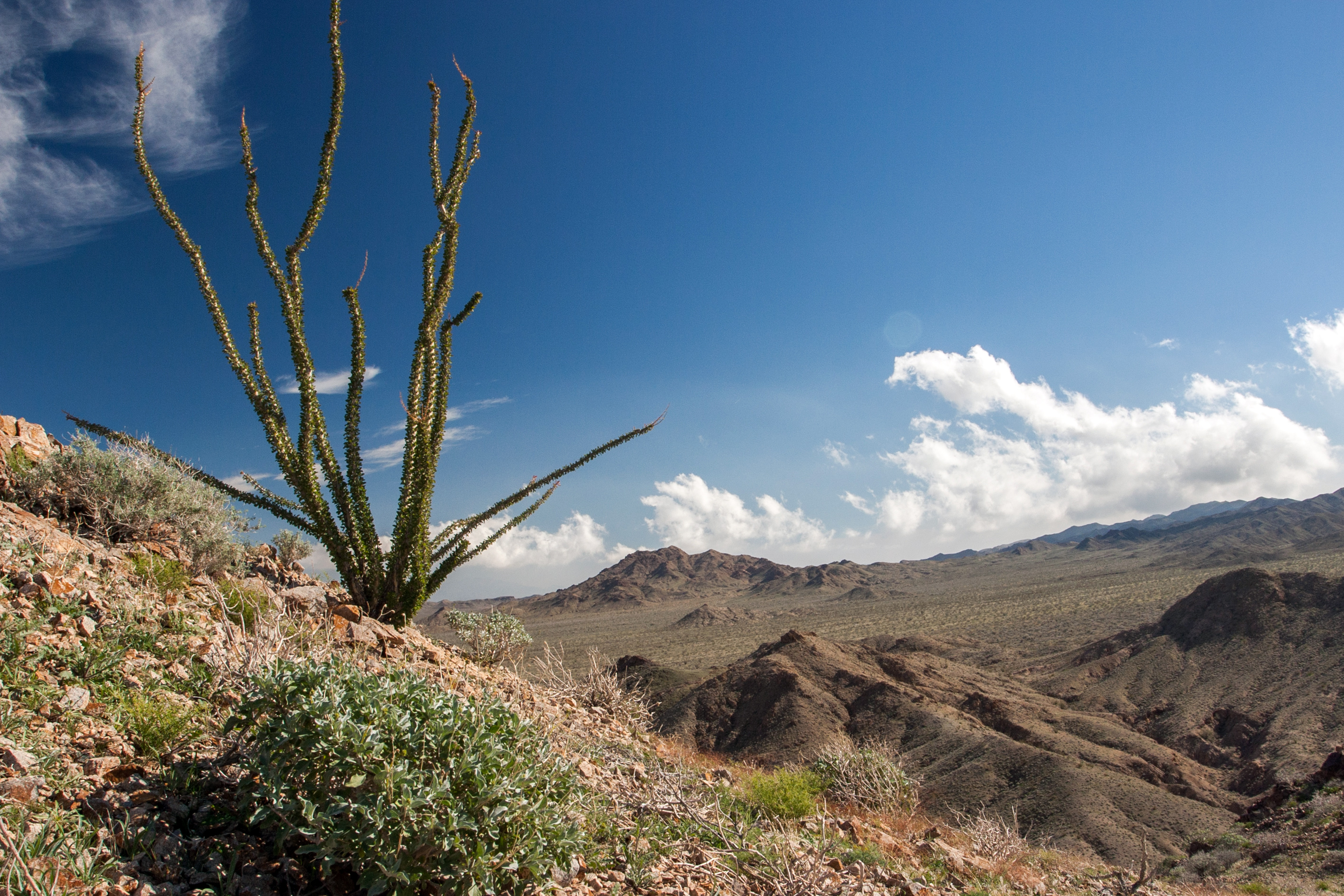
Fouquiera splendens

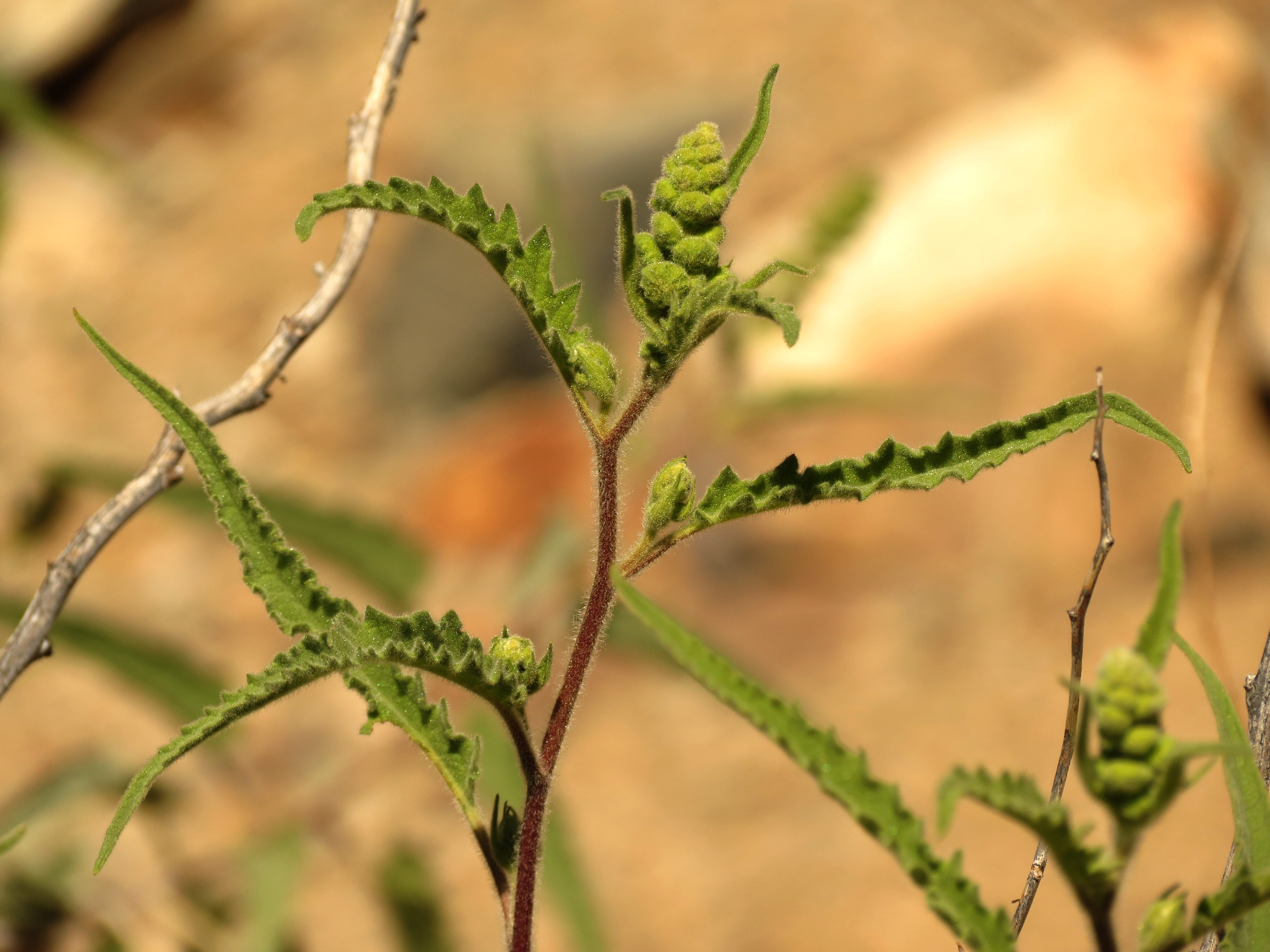
Ambrosia ambrosioides

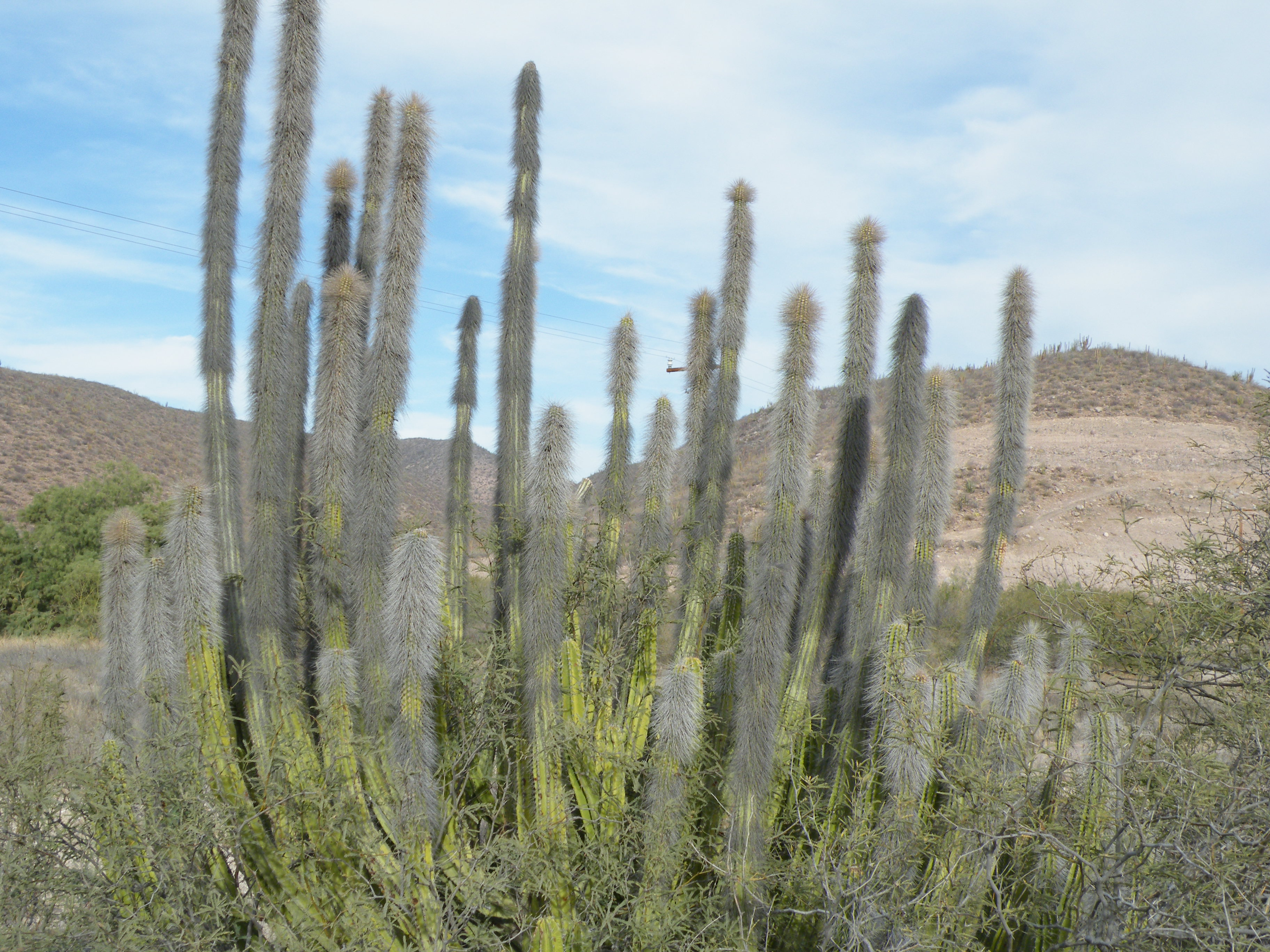
Lophocereus schottii

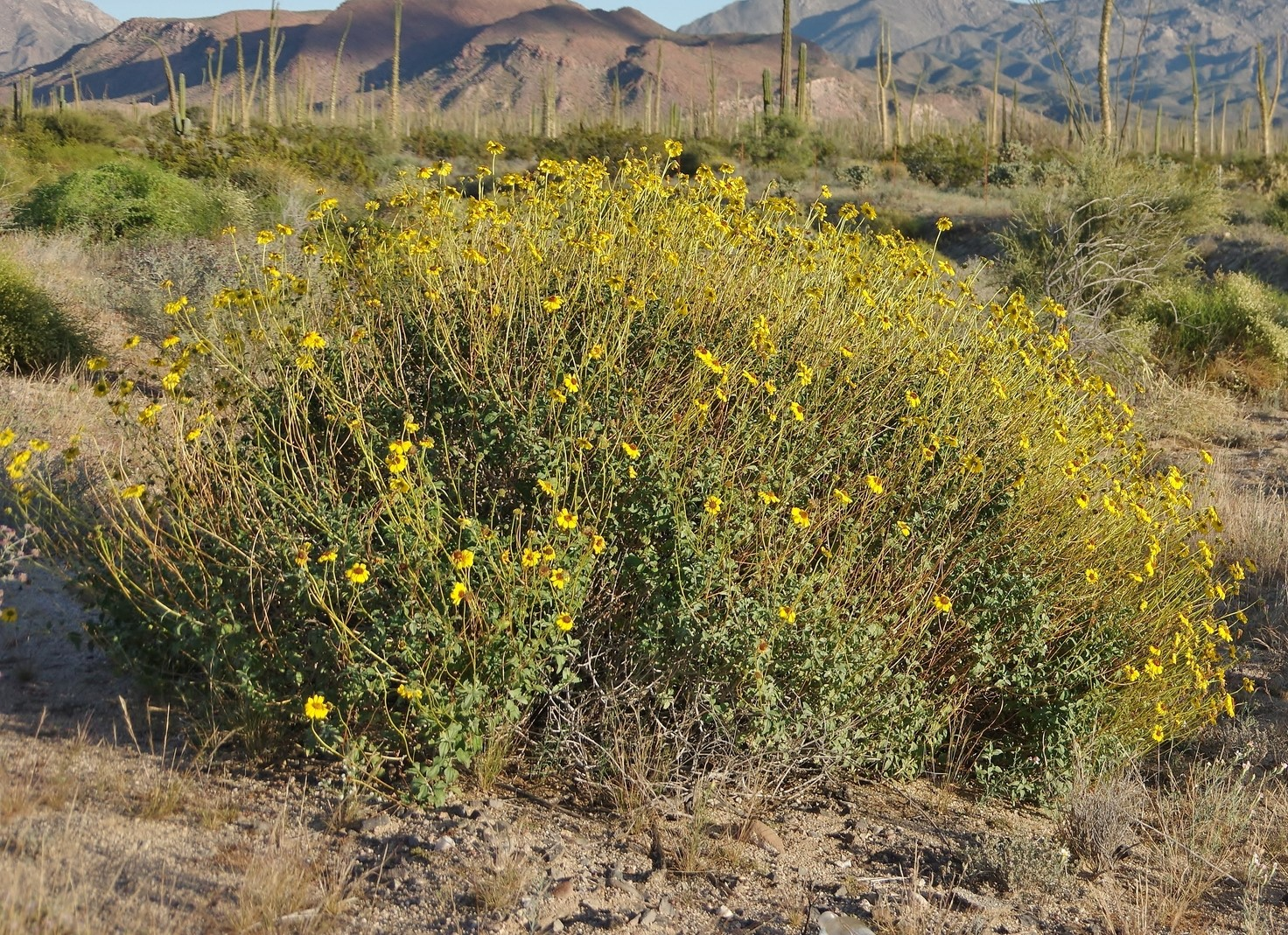
Encelia asperifolia

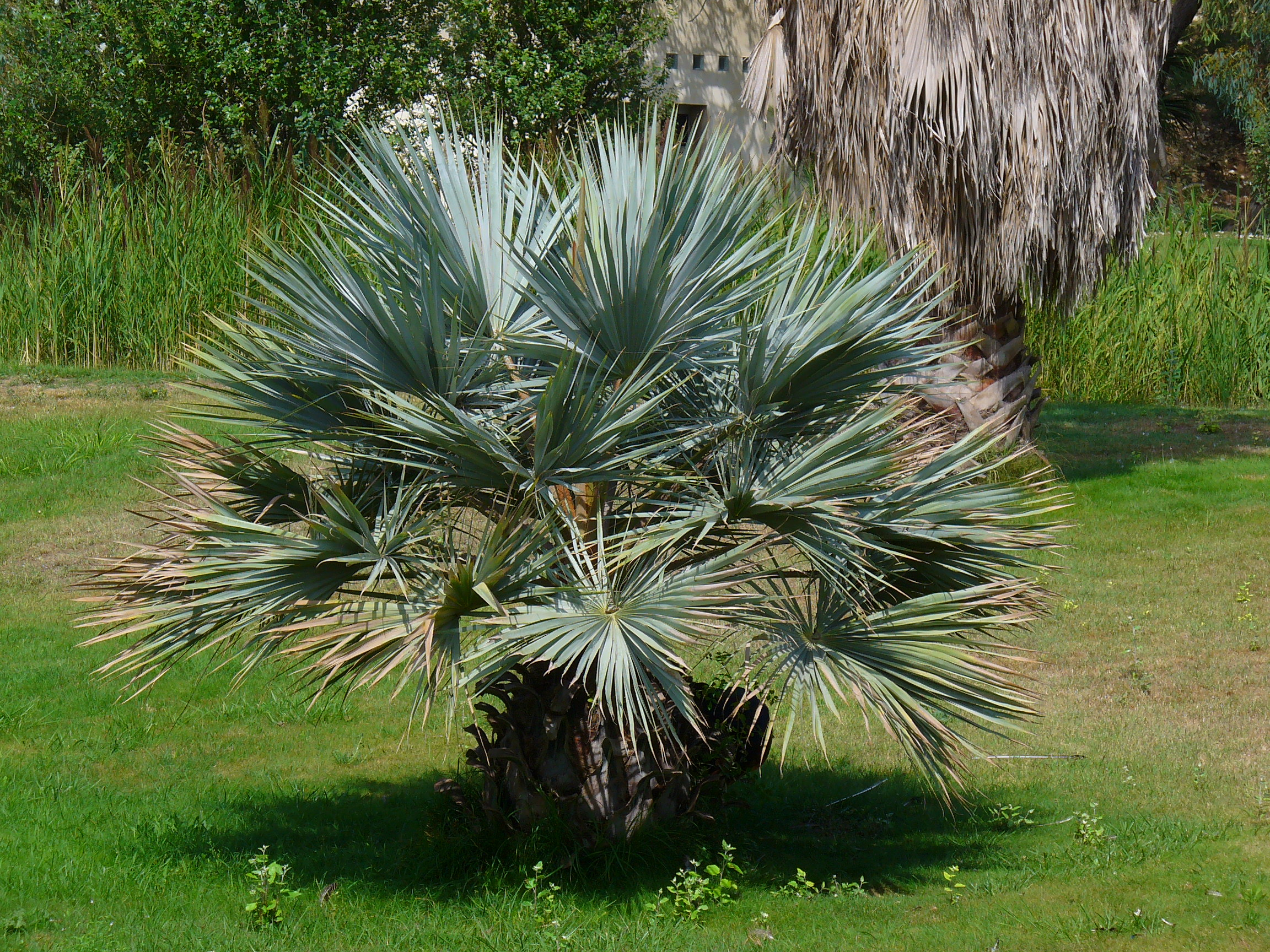
Brahea armata

== Climate ==
No weather station exists on or adjacent to this mountain range. The closest meteorological station is in Chapala, around 28 kilometres away. Because the sierra reaches elevations over 1,600 metres, it may be 8°C to 11°C cooler than at Chapala, which is at about 640 metres in elevation.
