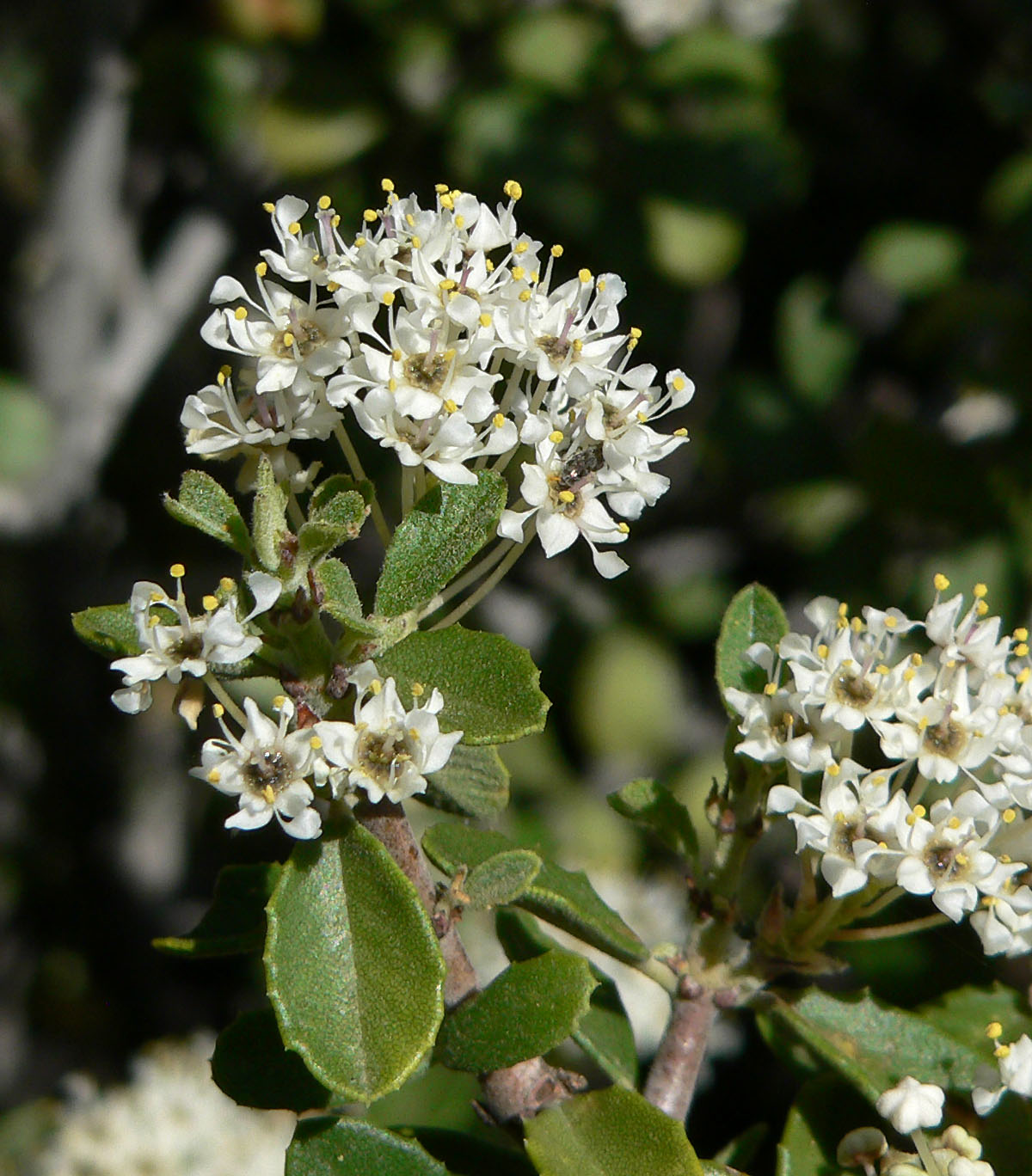

Scientific classification
- Kingdom: Plantae
- Clade: Tracheophytes
- Clade: Angiosperms
- Clade: Eudicots
- Clade: Rosids
- Order: Rosales
- Family: Rhamnaceae
- Genus: Ceanothus
- Subgenus: C. subg. Cerastes
- Species: C. pauciflorus

Binomial name
- Ceanothus pauciflorus Sessé and Moc. ex DC.

Synonyms
- Species synonymy: Ceanothus australis Rose; Ceanothus cuneatus A.Gray; Ceanothus franklinii (S.L.Welsh) S.L.Welsh; Ceanothus greggii A.Gray; Ceanothus greggii subsp. franklinii (S.L.Welsh) Kartesz & Gandhi; Ceanothus greggii var. franklinii S.L.Welsh; Ceanothus greggii var. lanuginosa M.E.Jones; Ceanothus greggii var. orbicularis E.H.Kelso; Ceanothus greggii var. vestitus (Greene) McMinn; Ceanothus greggii subsp. vestitus (Greene) Thorne; Ceanothus lanuginosus (M.E.Jones) Rose; Ceanothus verrucosus var. greggii (A.Gray) K.Brandegee; Ceanothus vestitus Greene; Scutia pauciflora G.Don

= Ceanothus pauciflorus =

Species of flowering plant

Ceanothus pauciflorus, known by the common name Mojave ceanothus, is a species of flowering shrub in the buckthorn family, Rhamnaceae. It is native to the Southwestern United States (Arizona, California, New Mexico, Texas, and Utah) and Mexico, where it grows primarily in shrubland communities at moderate to high elevations. It is characterized by oppositely arranged leaves, corky stipules and white flowers. It was formerly known as Ceanothus greggii.

== Description ==
Ceanothus pauciflorus is a many-branched shrub with woody parts that are gray in color and somewhat woolly. The flowers bloom in spring. Blooms are considered highly fragrant. C. pauciflorus is eagerly browsed by livestock and wild ungulates such as mule deer and desert bighorn sheep.

=== Morphology ===
This species is a shrub, around 0.2 to 4 m tall. The stem is ascending to erect, and generally branches from at or near the base. The twigs are colored a pale gray to more or less white, and are densely puberulent to short-tomentose. The evergreen leaves are arranged oppositely, on a petiole 1 to 3 mm long, and with a leaf blade 5 to 20 mm long by 3 to 19 mm wide. The adaxial surface of the leaf is concave, colored gray-green to yellow-green, and puberulent, becoming glabrous (smooth) in age. The abaxial surface of the leaf is convex, colored gray-green, and is glabrous or has short, curly hairs. The tip of the leaf is generally shaped acute to obtuse. The margins of the leaf may have teeth. The stipule is a knob-like structure.

The inflorescence is a small (less than 2 cm long) cluster of many white flowers on short lateral branches. The fruit is a horned capsule a few millimeters wide which bursts explosively to expel the three seeds inside, which require thermal scarification from wildfire before they can germinate.

== Taxonomy ==
This species is a member of the Ceanothus subgenus Cerastes.

=== Classification ===
This species was originally discovered to science by Spanish botanists Martín Sessé y Lacasta and José Mariano Mociño on an expedition to western Mexico in 1790 to 1791. It was later described as Ceanothus pauciflorus by Augustin Pyramus de Candolle in 1825, based on the illustrations made by Sessé and Mociño expedition. Sessé and Mociño also collected a flowering specimen of Ceanothus, later determined to be Ceanothus pauciflorus.

Because Ceanothus pauciflorus was the first description of the plant, subsequent descriptions were reduced to synonyms. It was named by Asa Gray of Harvard University in 1853 as Ceanothus greggii in honor of its collector, Josiah Gregg, who found the plant in 1847 at the site of the Battle of Buena Vista in the Mexican state of Coahuila during the Mexican–American War. Edward Lee Greene named it as Ceanothus vestitus, but recent taxonomic analysis finds that C. vestitus does not have enough morphological evidence to warrant a separate taxon from C. pauciflorus.

== Distribution and habitat ==
Ceanothus pauciflorus is widely distributed throughout the southwestern United States and northern Mexico. In the United States, it is found in the states of Arizona, California, Nevada, New Mexico, Texas, and Utah. It is widely distributed in Mexico, found from Baja California and Coahuila south to Oaxaca. In Baja California, it is found from the Sierra Juarez to the Sierra de la Asamblea. However, it is replaced in a portion of its range in California and Baja California with a close relative, Ceanothus perplexans. This species is found on a variety of habitats over its wide distribution, although it is almost always found in shrub-dominated communities like chaparral and matorral at moderate to high elevations (550 to 2600 m).

== See also ==
- California chaparral and woodlands
- Mojave Desert
- Sky island
