= Chamisa =

Chamisa may refer to:

- Ericameria nauseosa, a shrub species found in western North America (formerly in the genus Chrysothamnus)
- any plant of the genus Chrysothamnus or Ericameria
- Anthodiscus pilosus, a plant species found in Colombia and Peru
- Nelson Chamisa (born 1978), a Zimbabwean politician

== See also ==
- Chamiza (Atriplex canescens), a shrub species native to the western and mid-western United States
- Chamise (Adenostoma fasciculatum), a shrub species native to California and Baja California
