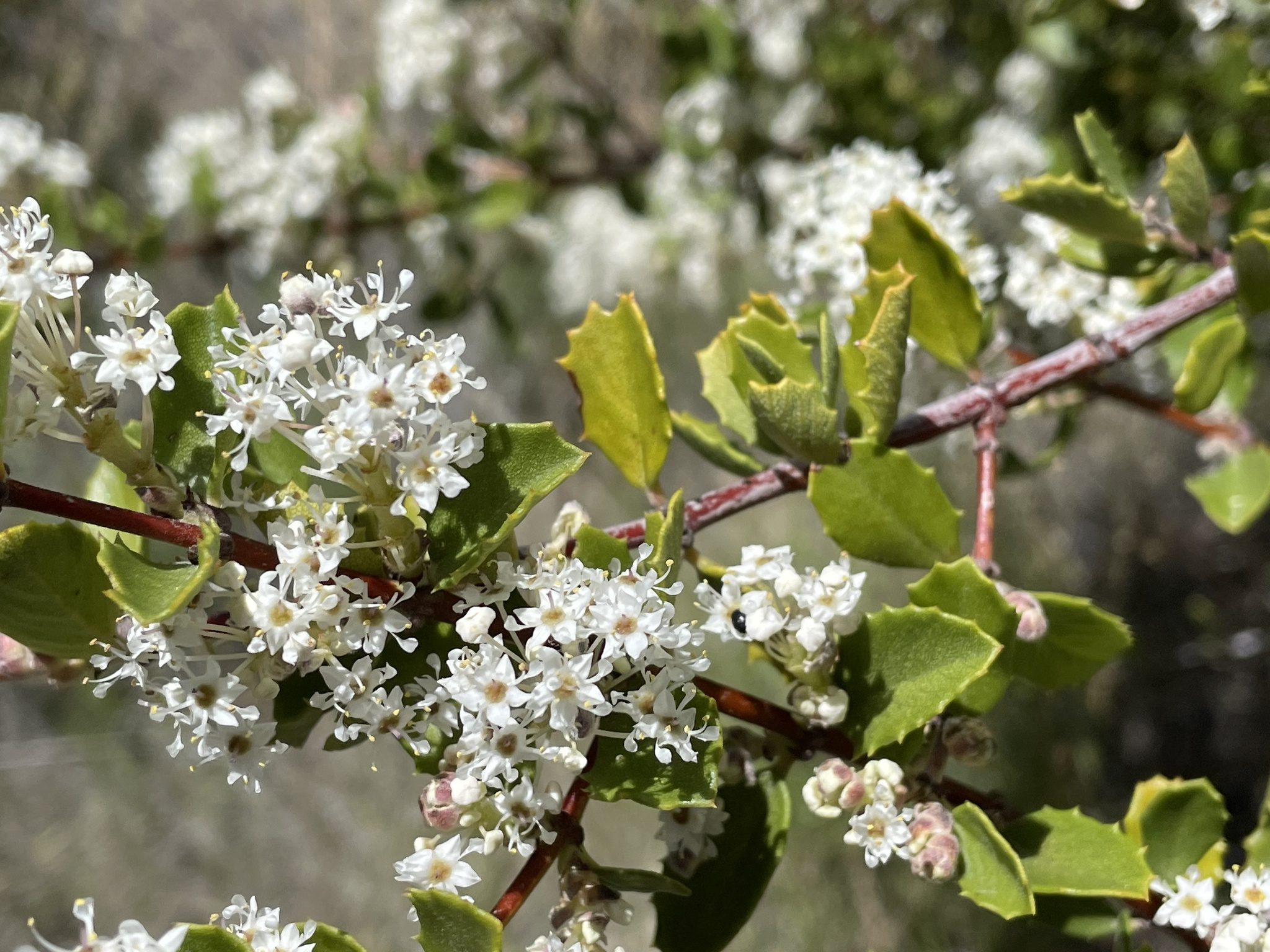
- Cup-leaved ceanothus in Anza-Borrego Desert State Park, California, 2021

Conservation status
- Apparently Secure (NatureServe)

Scientific classification
- Kingdom: Plantae
- Clade: Tracheophytes
- Clade: Angiosperms
- Clade: Eudicots
- Clade: Rosids
- Order: Rosales
- Family: Rhamnaceae
- Genus: Ceanothus
- Subgenus: C. subg. Cerastes
- Species: C. perplexans

Binomial name
- Ceanothus perplexans Trelease

= Ceanothus perplexans =

Species of flowering plant

Ceanothus perplexans, commonly known as cup-leaved ceanothus, is a species of flowering shrub in the Rhamnaceae (buckthorn) family. It is native to California, southwestern Arizona, and Baja California.

== Description ==
Ceanothus perplexans is an evergreen shrub that typically grows 1 to 3 meters tall with spreading, intricately branched stems. Its leaves are a defining characteristic: small, thick, leathery, and oppositely arranged, with distinct cupped leaves that give the plant its common name. In spring, it produces clusters of white or pale blue flowers.

== Taxonomy ==
Ceanothus perplexans is classified within the subgenus Cerastes of the genus Ceanothus. It is sometimes treated as a variety of Ceanothus greggii and referred to as Ceanothus greggii var. perplexans.

== Habitat and ecology ==
Ceanothus perplexans is found in chaparral and desert scrub communities of the southwestern United States and northern Mexico. It grows in dry, rocky slopes and canyons at elevations between 300 and 2100 meters.

=== Soil preference ===
It tolerates poor, well-drained soils including rocky or sandy substrates of a neutral to slightly alkaline pH.

=== Drought tolerance ===
As a drought-tolerant species, it requires little supplemental water once established.

== Conservation status ==
Ceanothus perplexans is not considered threatened or endangered, having a relatively wide distribution. However, habitat loss and fragmentation due to development and agriculture can pose potential threats in certain parts of its range.
