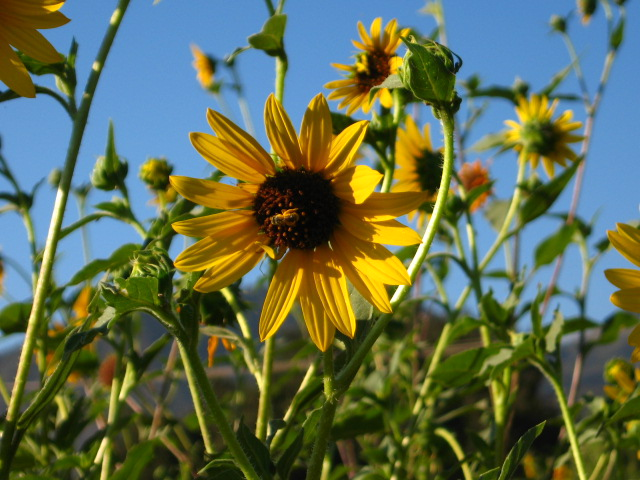

Conservation status
- Least Concern (IUCN 3.1)

Scientific classification
- Kingdom: Plantae
- Clade: Embryophytes
- Clade: Tracheophytes
- Clade: Angiosperms
- Clade: Eudicots
- Clade: Asterids
- Order: Asterales
- Family: Asteraceae
- Tribe: Heliantheae
- Genus: Helianthus
- Species: H. californicus

Binomial name
- Helianthus californicus DC. 1836 not Nutt. ex Torr. & A.Gray 1842

= Helianthus californicus =

Species of sunflower

Helianthus californicus is a North American species of sunflower known by the common name California sunflower. It is native to California in the United States and Baja California in Mexico, where it grows in many types of habitats. Classified within the Asteraceae family, it forms dense colonies in grasslands, riparian zones, and coastal foothills. Unlike the cultivated Helianthus annuus, H. californicus is a native and wild species that supports California’s ecology.

== Description ==
Helianthus californicus is an erect perennial herb growing from a network of tough, woody roots with small rhizomes. It is a sprawling, gangly plant, sending a thin stem to heights between one and three meters (3–10 feet) or more. The lance-shaped leaves may be 20 centimeters (8 inches) long and are smooth or slightly toothed along the edges. The inflorescence holds several flower heads. Each head is supported by a base covered in long, pointed phyllaries that bend back as the head ages and develops fruit.

The flower head has a fringe of 15-25 golden yellow ray florets, each two to three centimeters (3/4–1 1/4 in) long, and a center filled with curly yellow and brown disc florets. The fruits or dry achene of the flower are small (often referred to as sunflower seeds), only about 5 millimetres (¼ inch) long, and are dispersed by birds, animals, or wind. These seeds develop from the disc florets in the center of the flower head.

== Distribution and habitat ==
Helianthus californicus is endemic to California, with a range that extends slightly into northern Baja California. It occurs from Del Norte County to San Diego County, reaching east into the Sierra Nevada foothills, generally below 1,600 meters (5,200 ft). The species thrives in a variety of open habitats, often moist. The flower often forms loose colonies through rhizomatous growth, particularly in the Bay Area, Central Valley, and along the California coastal foothills, where it contributes to the structure of native vegetation communities. Distribution maps are available through the Biota of North America Program (BONAP) and the Jepson eFlora, University of California, Berkeley.

== Ecology and conservation ==
In California ecosystems, H. californicus serves as an important late-season nectar source, blooming from midsummer through fall (July–October) when most native species have already finished flowering. Its flowers attract bees, butterflies, and birds (pollinators), as well as caterpillars, insects, squirrels, and bats. The plant’s seeds provide food for birds and small mammals, while its deep root system helps soil stabilize and recover after fires or droughts.

Although it is classified as Least Concern, the species faces habitat pressures from development, invasive species, and increasing wildfires. Despite these challenges, its drought tolerance and rhizomatous growth enable it to persist across much of its native range. For these reasons, H. californicus is frequently used in restoration, erosion control, and pollinator garden projects across California, appearing in state and regional parks, educational campuses, and private gardens, where it reflects the resilience and value of the state’s wild flora.

== Cultural and human uses ==
The common sunflower Helianthus annuus (a close relative of Helianthus californicus) was widely used by Indigenous peoples across California and North America. Sunflower seeds were eaten raw, roasted, or ground into flour for cakes and pinole, and the oil was applied to skin and hair or used medicinally for ailments such as snakebites and inflammation.

Because H. californicus shares similar morphology and seed composition, it likely held comparable, though less documented, roles locally. Its seeds are likely to contain nutritious oils and proteins typical of wild sunflowers, making the species relevant to contemporary research on the revival of native foods.

== Additional research ==
Compared with Helianthus annuus, Helianthus californicus has much less research on its discovery, oil content, health benefits, etc... Further research would help specify and provide more detail on its potential for drought-resistant breeding, native ecological restoration, and pollinator support in California’s changing climate.
