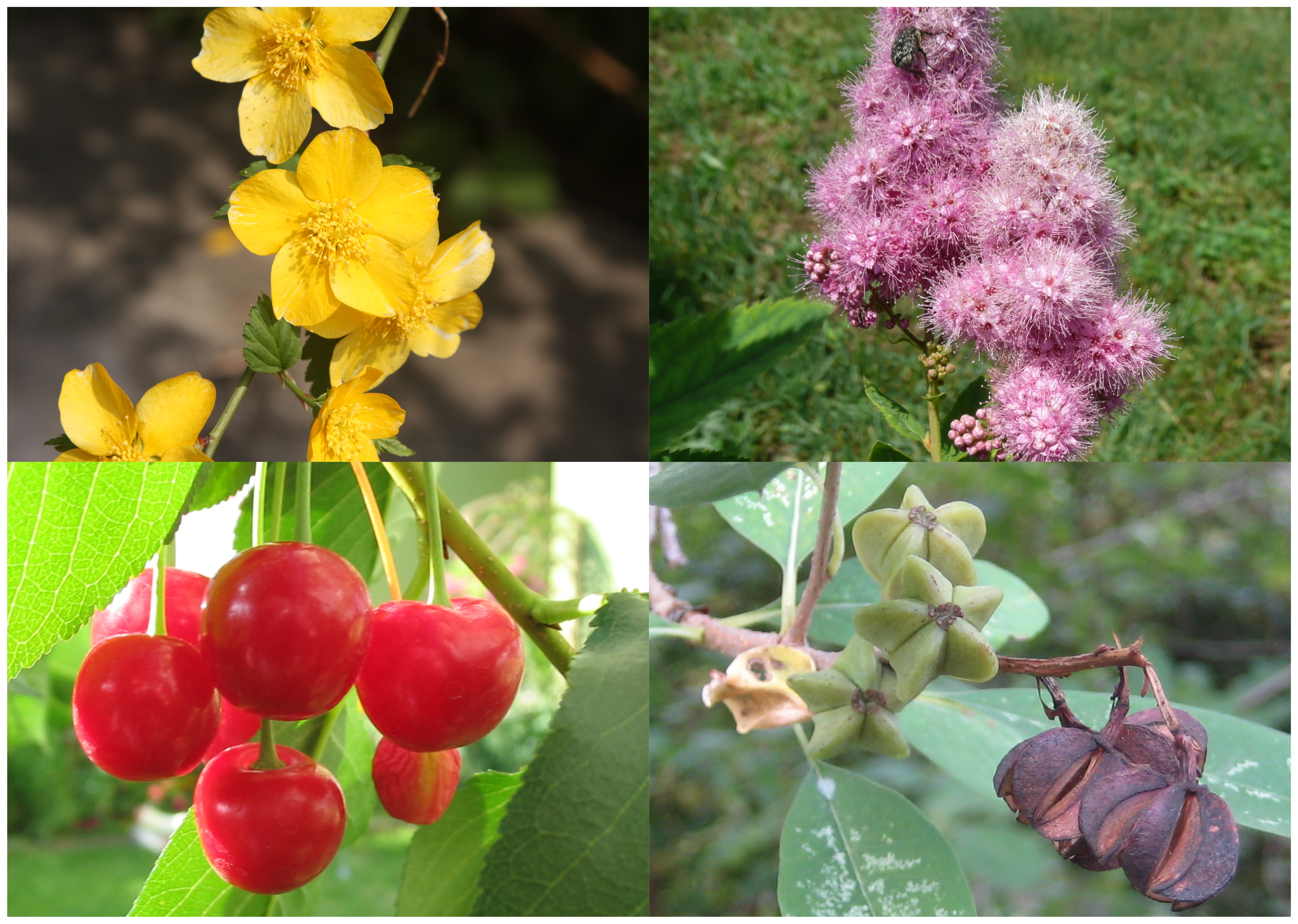
- (clockwise from top-left) Kerria japonica, Spiraea sp., Exochorda racemosa, Prunus cerasus

Scientific classification
- Kingdom: Plantae
- Clade: Tracheophytes
- Clade: Angiosperms
- Clade: Eudicots
- Clade: Rosids
- Order: Rosales
- Family: Rosaceae
- Subfamily: Amygdaloideae; Arn.

Tribes
- Amygdaleae; Exochordeae; Gillenieae; Kerrieae; Lyonothamneae; Maleae; Neillieae; Sorbarieae; Spiraeeae

Synonyms
- Coleogynoideae Takhtajan 1997; Dichotomanthoideae Takhtajan 1997; Lyonothamnoideae Schulze-Menz 1964; Maloideae C.Weber; Pomoideae Juss. 1789; Prunoideae Horan.; Spiraeoideae Arn.

= Amygdaloideae =

Amygdaloideae Temporal range: Eocene - recent Possible Albian record

Subfamily of flowering plants

Amygdaloideae is a subfamily within the flowering plant family Rosaceae. It was formerly considered by some authors to be separate from Rosaceae, and the family names Prunaceae and Amygdalaceae have been used. Reanalysis from 2007 has shown that the previous definition of subfamily Spiraeoideae was paraphyletic. To solve this problem, a larger subfamily was defined that includes the former Amygdaloideae, Spiraeoideae, and Maloideae. This subfamily, however, is to be called Amygdaloideae rather than Spiraeoideae under the International Code of Nomenclature for algae, fungi, and plants as updated in 2011.

As traditionally defined, the Amygdaloideae includes such commercially important crops as plum, cherry, apricot, peach, and almond. The fruit of these plants are known as stone fruit (drupes), as each fruit contains a hard shell (the endocarp) called a stone or pit, which contains the single seed.

The expanded definition of the Amygdaloideae adds to these commercially important crops such as apples and pears that have pome fruit, and also important ornamental plants such as Spiraea and Aruncus that have hard dry fruits.

== Taxonomic history ==
The name Prunoideae is sometimes used, but is incorrect. The 1835 publication of that name by Gilbert Thomas Burnett (Burnett) is invalid because it lacks a description (or diagnosis or reference to an earlier description or diagnosis). Paul Fedorowitsch Horaninow (Horan.) published the name in 1847, but Amygdaloideae, published in 1832 by George Arnott Walker-Arnott, has priority and is therefore the correct name.

The taxonomy of this group of plants within the Rosaceae has recently been unclear. In 2001 it was reported that Amygdaloideae sensu stricto consists of two distinct genetic groups or "clades", Prunus–Maddenia and Exochorda–Oemleria–Prinsepia. Further refinement shows that Exochorda–Oemleria–Prinsepia is somewhat separate from Prunus–Maddenia–Pygeum, and that the traditional subfamilies Maloideae and Spiraeoideae must be included in Amygdaloideae if a paraphyletic group is to be avoided. With this classification, the genus Prunus is considered to include Armeniaca, Cerasus, Amygdalus, Padus, Laurocerasus, Pygeum, and Maddenia.

Robert Frost alluded to the merging of Amygdalaceae into Rosaceae in his poem The Rose Family, when he wrote "The rose is a rose and was always a rose / But the theory now goes that the apple's a rose, / and the pear is, and so's the plum, I suppose." In the next line he wrote, "The dear [i.e., "the dear Lord", euphemized] only knows what will next prove a rose." This referred to shifting botanical opinion which had recently reunited Amygdalaceae, Spiraeaceae, and Malaceae into Rosaceae (which matches de Jussieu's 1789 classification).

== Classification ==
A recent classification places the following genera in the subfamily:

- Adenostoma
- Amelanchier
- Aria here considered a subgenus of Sorbus
- Aronia
- Aruncus
- Chaenomeles
- Chamaebatiaria
- Chamaemeles
- Chamaemespilus here considered a subgenus of Sorbus
- Coleogyne
- Cormus here considered a subgenus of Sorbus
- Cotoneaster
- Crataegus
- Cydonia
- Dichotomanthes
- Docynia
- Docyniopsis
- Eriobotrya
- Eriolobus
- Exochorda
- Gillenia
- Hesperomeles
- Heteromeles
- Holodiscus
- Kageneckia
- Kelseya
- Kerria
- Lindleya
- Luetkea
- Lyonothamnus
- Malacomeles
- Malus (Apples and crabapples)
- Mespilus
- Neillia
- Neviusia
- Oemleria
- Osteomeles
- Peraphyllum
- Petrophytum
- Photinia
- Physocarpus
- Prinsepia
- Prunus (Peaches and almonds)
- Pseudocydonia
- Pyracantha
- Pyrus (Pears)
- Rhaphiolepis
- Rhodotypos
- Sibiraea
- Sorbaria
- Sorbus
- Spiraea
- Spiraeanthus
- †Stonebergia (Early Eocene; Allenby Formation, Canada)
- Stranvaesia
- Torminalis here considered as Sorbus subgenus Torminaria
- Vauquelinia
- Xerospiraea
