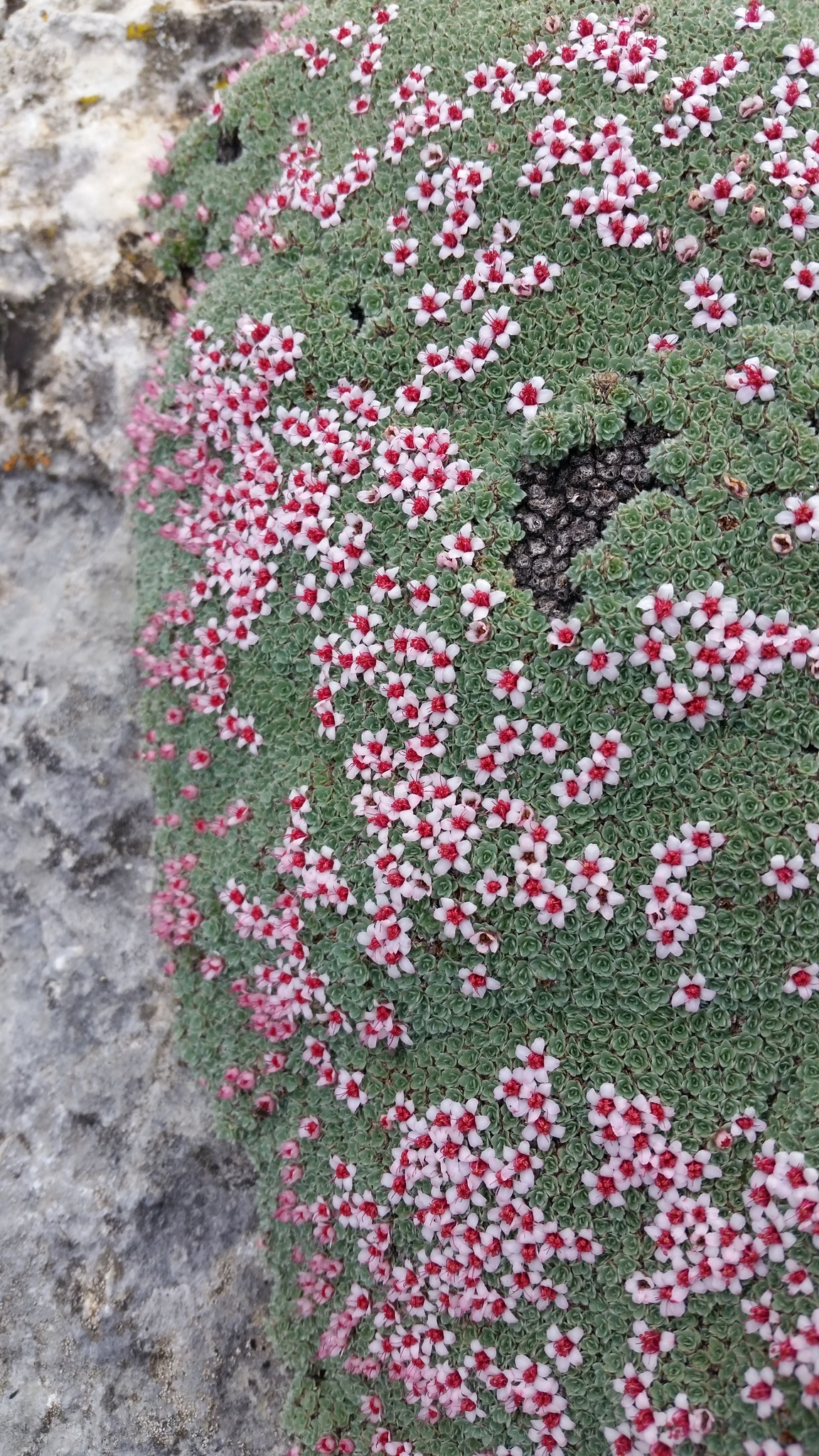
- Kelseya uniflora in flower

Scientific classification
- Kingdom: Plantae
- Clade: Tracheophytes
- Clade: Angiosperms
- Clade: Eudicots
- Clade: Rosids
- Order: Rosales
- Family: Rosaceae
- Genus: Kelseya (S.Watson) Rydb.
- Species: K. uniflora

Binomial name
- Kelseya uniflora Rydb.

= Kelseya =

Genus of plants

Kelseya is a monotypic genus of flowering plants belonging to the family Rosaceae. The only species is Kelseya uniflora. It is commonly called the oneflower kelseya, spiraea or alpine laurel. The genus was named in honor of Francis Duncan Kelsey, a Montana resident botanist, who discovered the plant in 1888 at the "Gate of the Mountains" near Townsend.

== Range and habitat ==
Kelseya uniflora is a perennial limestone endemic that grows in cracks of volcanic and limestone outcrops at 1500-3500 m elevation. It is native in 3 states in Northwestern USA: Idaho, Montana and Wyoming. It typically grows as a solitary plant in a sun-exposed position as a ground covering subshrub. This species has also been reported in riparian woodland but this should be considered an outlier. Their most prolific growth is on the South Summit of Hunt Mountain in the Bighorn Mountains where it grows on Karst features.

== Description ==
This species rarely measures more than 10 cm tall but often achieves 1 m or more in diameter. Their habit is an adaptation to the wind-blast exposed rocky ridges they grow on alongside cushion plant communities. Plants branch into numerous slender stems that are densely covered with imbricated leaves. The leaves are light to greyish green, leathery and hairy, ovate-oblong and grow in dense rosettes. Leaves become brownnish to black when withered and remain on the branch to form a hardened protective structure. The branches have fine hairs that collect moisture from cracks in the rock.

The solitary terminal flowers are produced very early in spring and are reddish-purple to pinkish white. The flowers typically open as the snow melts back. The 5 sepals are only 2 mm long with the 5 petals elliptic to oblong and advertising a shade of pink. The 7 to 12 stamens are slightly longer than the petals.

== Taxonomy ==
From very early on it was clear that these plants formed an outlier group within Rosaceae and together with Petrophytum and Eriogynia (now Luetkea) they were treated as sections within the genus Eriogynia. After a number of revisions and molecular analysis they are now member of tribe Spiraeeae.

== Uses ==
The reduction in plant stature and its xeric alpine habitat make it a popular but challenging subject for alpine garden enthusiasts.

== Conservation status ==
Kelseya uniflora is reported to have a global NatureServe conservation status of "Secure". Its global status, however dates from 1987 and needs review.

In the three states where it occurs its status is:

- Idaho: SNR (No Status Rank)
- Montana: S4 (Apparently Secure)
- Wyoming: S2 (Imperiled)

In 2006, naturalists from Montana and Wyoming were asked to report their findings on an apparent die-back occurring in local populations of this species. The author also mentioned the same happening with Petrophyton caespitosum, a species that inhabits a similar ecological niche.
