= Spiraeoideae =

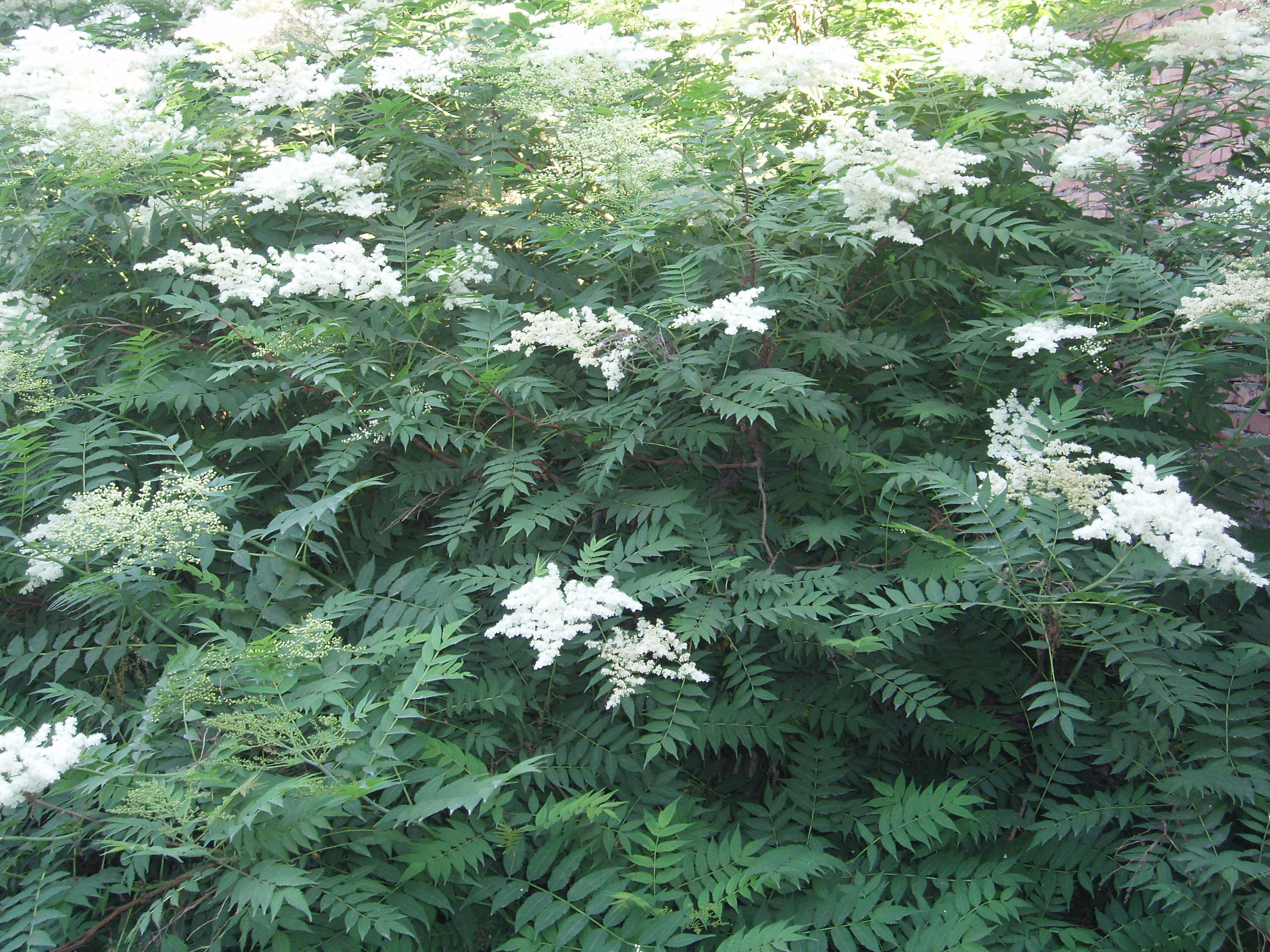

The subfamily Spiraeoideae was traditionally a subfamily of flowering plants within the family Rosaceae. The taxonomy of this subfamily has changed several times in the last century as more detailed studies have been carried out. Spiraeoideae as defined before 2007 is paraphyletic, leading some authors to define a broader subfamily which includes the Spiraeoideae as well as the Maleae (plants such as pears and apples whose fruits are pomes), and the Amygdaloideae (including almonds and plums, whose fruits are drupes). Such an expanded subfamily is to be called Amygdaloideae under the International Code of Nomenclature for algae, fungi, and plants.

The traditional Spiraeoideae are shrubs. Most have simple leaves, but the genera Aruncus and Sorbaria have pinnately compound leaves. Carpels are usually 2–5. Most genera traditionally placed in the Spiraeoideae produce flowers with distinct follicles that, upon seed-set, mature to form fruits that are aggregates of follicles.

A traditional classification places the following genera in the subfamily:

- Aruncus
- Eriogynia
- Euphronia
- Exochorda
- Gillenia
- Holodiscus
- Kageneckia
- Lindleya
- Neillia
- Physocarpus
- Quillaja
- Sibiraea
- Spiraea
- Spiraeanthus
- Sorbaria

== Examples ==
- Aruncus dioicus
- False spirea, Sorbaria sorbifolia
- Japanese spiraea, Spiraea japonica
