= Maloideae =

Subfamily of flowering plants

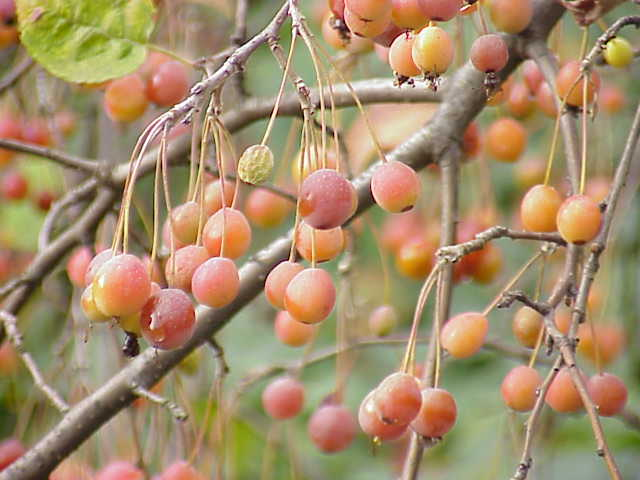
Malus sikkimensis

The Maloideae C.Weber was the apple subfamily, a grouping used by some taxonomists within the rose family, Rosaceae. Recent molecular phylogenetic evidence has shown that the traditional Spiraeoideae and Amygdaloideae form part of the same clade as the traditional Maloideae, and the correct name for this group is Amygdaloideae. Earlier circumscriptions of Maloideae are more-or-less equivalent to subtribe Malinae or to tribe Maleae. The group includes a number of plants bearing commercially important fruits, such as apples and pears, while others are cultivated as ornamentals.

In its traditional circumscription this subfamily consisted exclusively of shrubs and small trees characterised by a pome, a type of accessory fruit that does not occur in other Rosaceae, and by a basal haploid chromosome count of 17 (instead of 7, 8, or 9 as in the other Rosaceae), involving approximately 28 genera with approximately 1100 species worldwide, with most species occurring in the temperate Northern Hemisphere.

== Taxonomy ==
The subfamily was given the name Pomoideae Juss. in 1789, but this name is no longer accepted under the nomenclature codes because it is not based on a genus name. It has also been separated into its own family the Malaceae Small (formerly Pomaceae Lindl.).

An earlier intermediate classification expanded Maloideae to include four genera with dry non-pome fruit. These are Kageneckia, Lindleya, and Vauquelinia, which have a haploid chromosome count of 15 or 17, and Gillenia, which is herbaceous and has a haploid chromosome count of 9.

A traditional circumscription of Maloideae includes the following genera:

- Amelanchier – serviceberry, juneberry
- Aria (see Sorbus)
- Aronia – chokeberry
- Chaenomeles – Japanese quince
- Chamaemeles
- Chamaemespilus (see Sorbus chamaemespilus)
- Cormus (see Sorbus)
- Cotoneaster – cotoneaster
- Crataegus – hawthorn
- Cydonia – quince
- Dichotomanthes
- Docynia
- Docyniopsis
- Eriobotrya – loquat
- Eriolobus
- Hesperomeles
- Heteromeles – toyon
- Malacomeles
- Malus – apple, crabapple
- Mespilus – medlar
- Osteomeles
- Peraphyllum
- Photinia
- Pseudocydonia – Chinese quince
- Pyracantha – firethorn
- Pyrus – pear
- Rhaphiolepis – hawthorn
- Sorbus – rowan, whitebeam, service tree
- Stranvaesia = Photinia pro parte
- Torminalis (see Sorbus torminalis)

Intergeneric hybrids:

- × Amelasorbus
- × Crataegosorbus
- × Crataemespilus
- × Malosorbus
- × Sorbocotoneaster
- × Sorbopyrus

Graft chimeras:

- + Crataegomespilus
- + Pyrocydonia (Pirocydonia)
