= Basionym =

Scientific name on which another scientific name is based

In the scientific naming of organisms, a basionym or basyonym is the original name on which a new name is based; the author citation of the new name should include the authors of the basionym in parentheses. The term "basionym" is used in both botany and zoology. In zoology, alternate terms such as original combination or protonym are sometimes used instead. Bacteriology uses a similar term, basonym, spelled without an i.

Although "basionym" and "protonym" are often used interchangeably, they have slightly different technical definitions. A basionym is the correct spelling of the original name (according to the applicable nomenclature rules), while a protonym is the original spelling of the original name. These are typically the same, but in rare cases may differ.

When creating new taxonomic names, there are specific rules about how basionyms can be used. A new combination or name at new rank must be based directly on the original basionym rather than on any intermediate combinations. This means that if a species is transferred between multiple genera over time, each new combination must refer back to the original name rather than to more recent combinations. This helps maintain a clear chain of nomenclature and prevents confusion about the ultimate source of the name. For example, when transferring a species that has already been moved to a different genus, taxonomists must cite the original species name as the basionym, not the intermediate combination.

== Use in botany ==
The term "basionym" is used in botany only for the circumstances where a previous name exists with a useful description, and the International Code of Nomenclature for algae, fungi, and plants (ICNafp) does not require a full description with the new name. A basionym must therefore be legitimate. Basionyms are regulated by the code's articles 6.10, 7.3, 41, and others.

When a current name has a basionym, the author or authors of the basionym are included in parentheses at the start of the author citation. If a basionym is later found to be illegitimate, it becomes a replaced synonym and the current name's author citation must be changed so that the basionym authors do not appear.

Historical rules for basionyms have evolved over time. Prior to 1 January 1953, the requirements for referencing basionyms were less stringent: an indirect reference to a basionym or replaced synonym was sufficient for valid publication of a new combination, name at new rank, or replacement name. After this date, more explicit references became required.

=== Replaced synonyms ===
In some cases, taxonomists may need to publish a replacement name even when working with a legitimate existing name. This situation arises when it is not possible to publish a legitimate new combination or name at new rank, such as when the new name would create an illegitimate homonym (duplicate name) or when the name cannot be validly published under the nomenclatural rules (for example, in the case of tautonyms).

=== Types and original material ===
When working with basionyms and new combinations, there are specific rules regarding type specimens. Because a new combination is typified by the type of its basionym, all original material must also come from the basionym. This means that taxonomists cannot designate a lectotype (a type specimen selected after the original description) from specimens that were only cited or used in the later new combination but were not part of the original material of the basionym. Such specimens could only be designated as neotypes if no original material exists.

=== Combinatio nova ===
The basionym of the name Picea abies (the Norway spruce) is Pinus abies. The species was originally named Pinus abies by Carl Linnaeus and so the author citation of the basionym is simply "L." Later on, botanist Gustav Karl Wilhelm Hermann Karsten decided this species should not be grouped in the same genus (Pinus) as the pines, so he transferred it to the genus Picea (the spruces). The new name Picea abies is combinatio nova, a new combination (abbreviated comb. nov.). With author citation, the current name is "Picea abies (L.) Karst."

=== Status novus ===
In 1964, the subfamily name Pomoideae, which had been in use for the group within family Rosaceae that have pome fruit like apples, was no longer acceptable under the code of nomenclature because it is not based on a genus name. Claude Weber did not consider the family name Malaceae Small to be taxonomically appropriate, so he created the name Maloideae at the rank of subfamily, referring to the original description of the family, and using the same type. This change of rank from family to subfamily is an example of status novus (abbreviated stat. nov.), also called a "name at new rank".

== See also ==
- Glossary of scientific naming
- Synonym (taxonomy)
