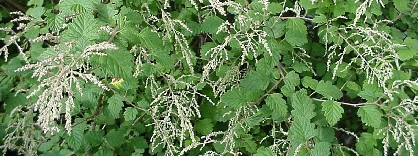
- Holodiscus discolor foliage and flower buds

Scientific classification
- Kingdom: Plantae
- Clade: Tracheophytes
- Clade: Angiosperms
- Clade: Eudicots
- Clade: Rosids
- Order: Rosales
- Family: Rosaceae
- Subfamily: Amygdaloideae
- Tribe: Spiraeeae
- Genus: Holodiscus (K.Koch) Maxim.

Species
- See text

Synonyms
- Schizonotus Raf., nom. illeg.; Sericotheca Raf.

= Holodiscus =

Genus of flowering plants

Holodiscus is a genus of flowering plants in the family Rosaceae, native to the Americas, from southwestern British Columbia, Canada and the western United States south to Bolivia.

The species are deciduous shrubs, growing to 1–7 metres (3.3–23.0 ft) tall.

== Species ==
Seven species are accepted by Plants of the World Online (POWO):

- Holodiscus argenteus (L.f.) Maxim.
- Holodiscus australis A.Heller
- Holodiscus discolor (Pursh) Maxim.
- Holodiscus fissus (Lindl.) C.K.Schneid.
- Holodiscus orizabae Ley
- Holodiscus pachydiscus (Rydb.) Standl.
- Holodiscus velutinus (Rydb.) Standl.

== Taxonomy ==
The position of the genus Holodiscus in the family Rosaceae has changed over the last century as more detailed studies have been carried out. It has been place in subfamily Maloideae, but recent molecular evidence places all of (the former) subfamily Maloideae inside the subfamily Amygdaloideae.
