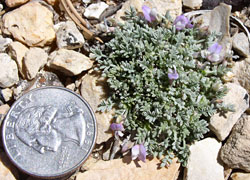
- var. cremnophylax

Conservation status
- Critically Imperiled (NatureServe)

Scientific classification
- Kingdom: Plantae
- Clade: Tracheophytes
- Clade: Angiosperms
- Clade: Eudicots
- Clade: Rosids
- Order: Fabales
- Family: Fabaceae
- Subfamily: Faboideae
- Genus: Astragalus
- Species: A. cremnophylax

Binomial name
- Astragalus cremnophylax Barneby, 1948

= Astragalus cremnophylax =

Species of legume

Astragalus cremnophylax is a rare species of milkvetch known by the common names sentry milkvetch and cliff milkvetch. It is endemic to Arizona, where the three varieties grow in three separate locations. The rarest variety, var. cremnophylax, is a federally listed endangered species which grows only on the rim of the Grand Canyon. The two other varieties are known from the Buckskin Mountains and Marble Canyon.

This plant is a resident of the Kaibab Limestone, where it grows in cracks in the bare limestone. The habitat is a pavement of dry, exposed, white rock that takes full sun and brisk, dry winds. Plants occur in rock crevices that have a few centimeters of soil, if any, and accumulate a minute amount of moisture at times. The species sometimes grows alongside Petrophytum caespitosum, which occupies a similar niche.

The rare var. cremnophylax was threatened with extinction when its tiny populations were trampled by tourists creeping to the edge of the Grand Canyon. Fences have been placed at strategic locations there to protect the plant.

== Varieties ==
There are three varieties of this species:

- A. cremnophylax var. cremnophylax – Grand Canyon
- A. cremnophylax var. myriorrhaphis – Buckskin Mountains
- A. cremnophylax var. hevronii – Marble Canyon
