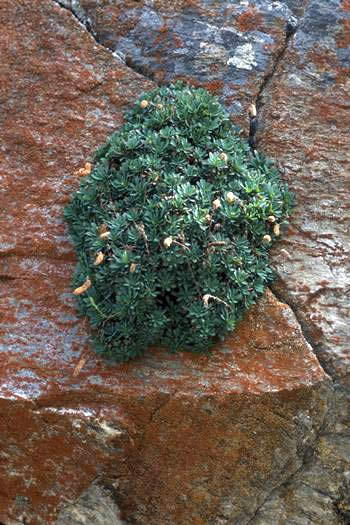

Conservation status
- Critically Imperiled (NatureServe)

Scientific classification
- Kingdom: Plantae
- Clade: Tracheophytes
- Clade: Angiosperms
- Clade: Eudicots
- Clade: Rosids
- Order: Rosales
- Family: Rosaceae
- Genus: Petrophytum
- Species: P. cinerascens

Binomial name
- Petrophytum cinerascens (Piper) Rydb.

= Petrophytum cinerascens =

Species of flowering plant

Petrophytum cinerascens (orth. var. Petrophyton cinerascens) is a rare species of flowering plant in the rose family known by the common names halfshrub rockmat and Chelan rockmat. It is endemic to the state of Washington in the United States, where it occurs in just a few locations along the Columbia River in Chelan and Douglas Counties.

== Description ==
Petrophytum cinerascens is a mat-forming perennial herb growing in cracks and crevices in riverside cliffs. The stems are up to 30 cm (1 ft) long, arising from the mat of leaves. The stems bear racemes 2 to 6 cm (0.79 to 2.4 in) long of white flowers with many stamens. Blooming occurs in June through September.

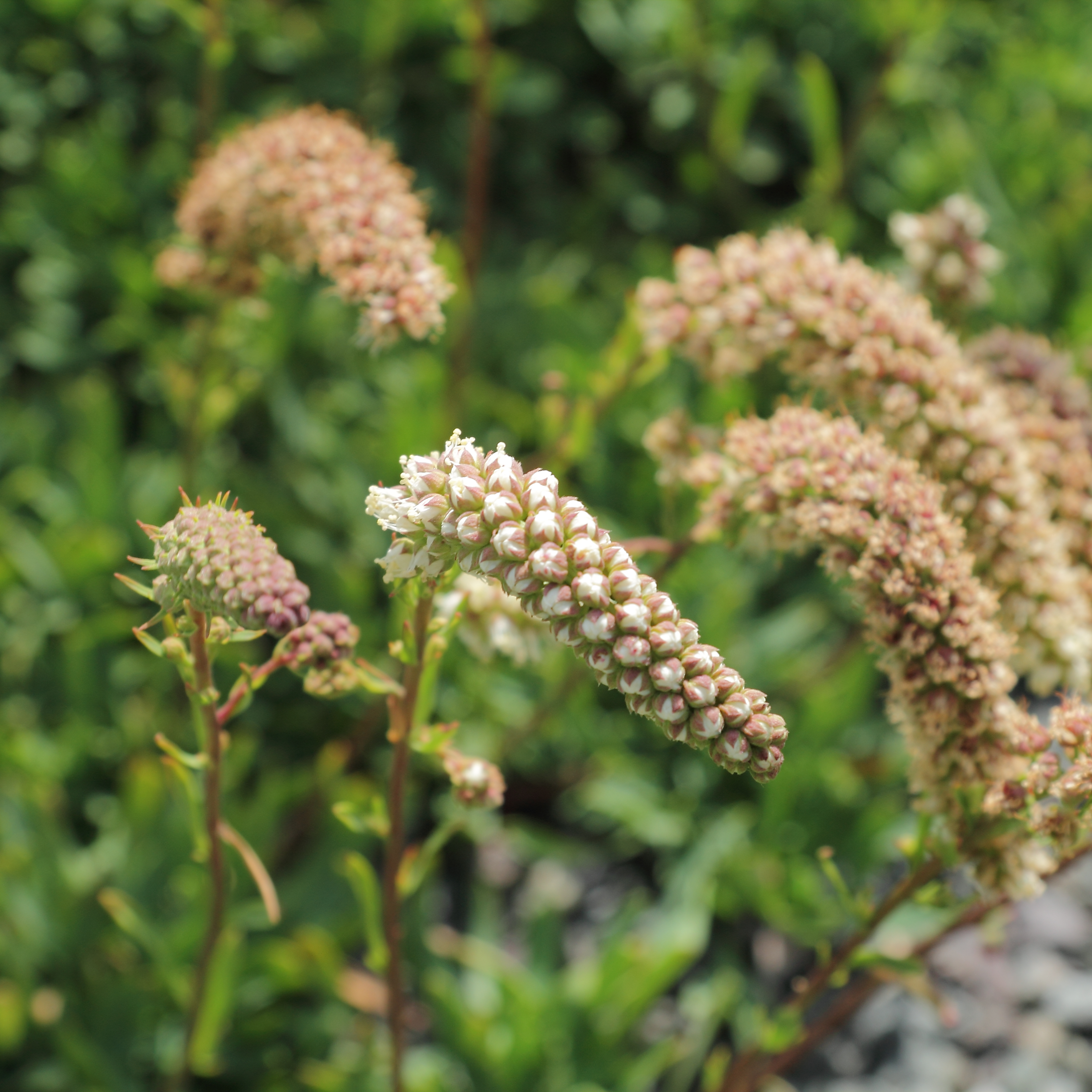
At Kew Gardens in London

== Conservation ==
There are five occurrences of this plant all in a 27-kilometer stretch of cliffs along the Columbia River in central Washington. Two of the occurrences have about 1000 individuals each; the other three have fewer.

The plant is threatened by quarrying of rock nearby. Other threats include highway maintenance, introduced species of plants such as cheat grass (Bromus tectorum), herbicides, rock climbing, motor vehicle emissions, and global warming.
