= Xerospiraea =

Scientific classification
- Kingdom: Plantae
- Clade: Embryophytes
- Clade: Tracheophytes
- Clade: Angiosperms
- Clade: Eudicots
- Clade: Rosids
- Order: Rosales
- Family: Rosaceae
- Tribe: Spiraeeae
- Genus: Xerospiraea; Hendrickson (1985 publ. 1986)
- Species: X. hartwegiana

Binomial name
- Xerospiraea hartwegiana (Rydb.) Hendrickson (1985 publ. 1986)

Synonyms
- Spiraea hartwegiana Rydb. (1908); Spiraea northcroftii I.M.Johnst. (1943); Spiraea parvifolia Benth. (1840), nom. illeg.

Genus of flowering plants

Xerospiraea hartwegiana is a species of flowering plant belonging to the family Rosaceae. It is endemic to Mexico. It is the sole species in genus Xerospiraea.
