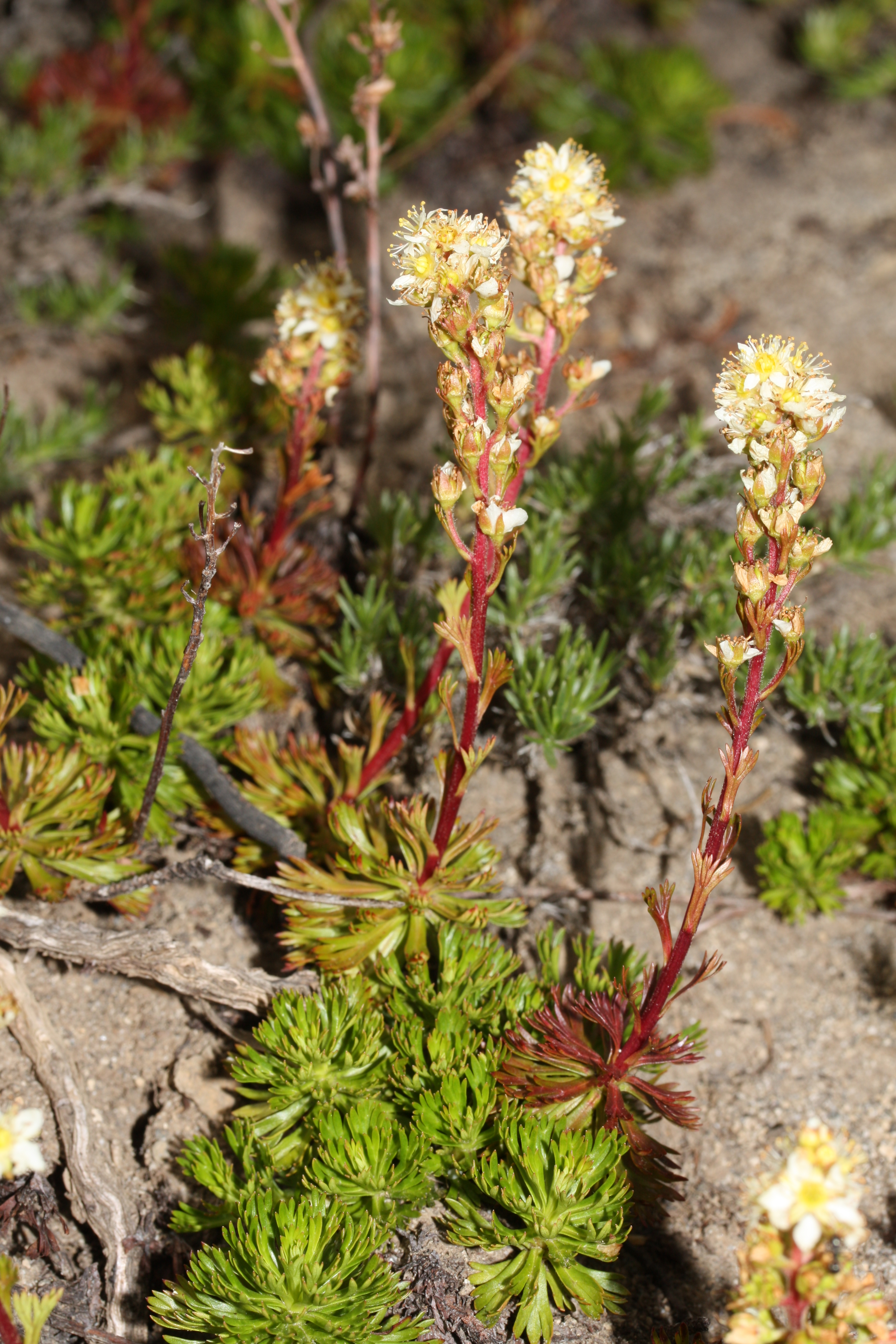
- Luetkea pectinata in Mount Rainier National Park

Scientific classification
- Kingdom: Plantae
- Clade: Tracheophytes
- Clade: Angiosperms
- Clade: Eudicots
- Clade: Rosids
- Order: Rosales
- Family: Rosaceae
- Subfamily: Amygdaloideae
- Tribe: Spiraeeae
- Genus: Luetkea; Bong.
- Species: L. pectinata

Binomial name
- Luetkea pectinata (Pursh) Kuntze

Synonyms
- Saxifraga pectinata Pursh

= Luetkea =

Genus of flowering plants

Luetkea is a genus of herbaceous plants in the family Rosaceae. One species is accepted. Luetkea pectinata (partridgefoot or luetkea) is a mat-forming semi-shrub. It is endemic to the cold portions of western North America occurring in subarctic Alaska, Yukon, western Northwest Territories, and subalpine to alpine regions of British Columbia, southwestern Alberta, Washington, Oregon, Idaho, northern California and western Montana.

The inflorescence of L. pectinata is a dense and erect terminal cluster 10 to 150 mm high with several to many short-stalked flowers. The leaves are 7 to 20 mm long and two or three times three-dissected. The last segments are linear or lanceolate. The fruit is a follicle with several seeds.

Partridge-foot is the only member of the genus Luetkea, which commemorates Count Luetke, a Russian captain and explorer of the early 1800s who mapped the coastline of Alaska.
