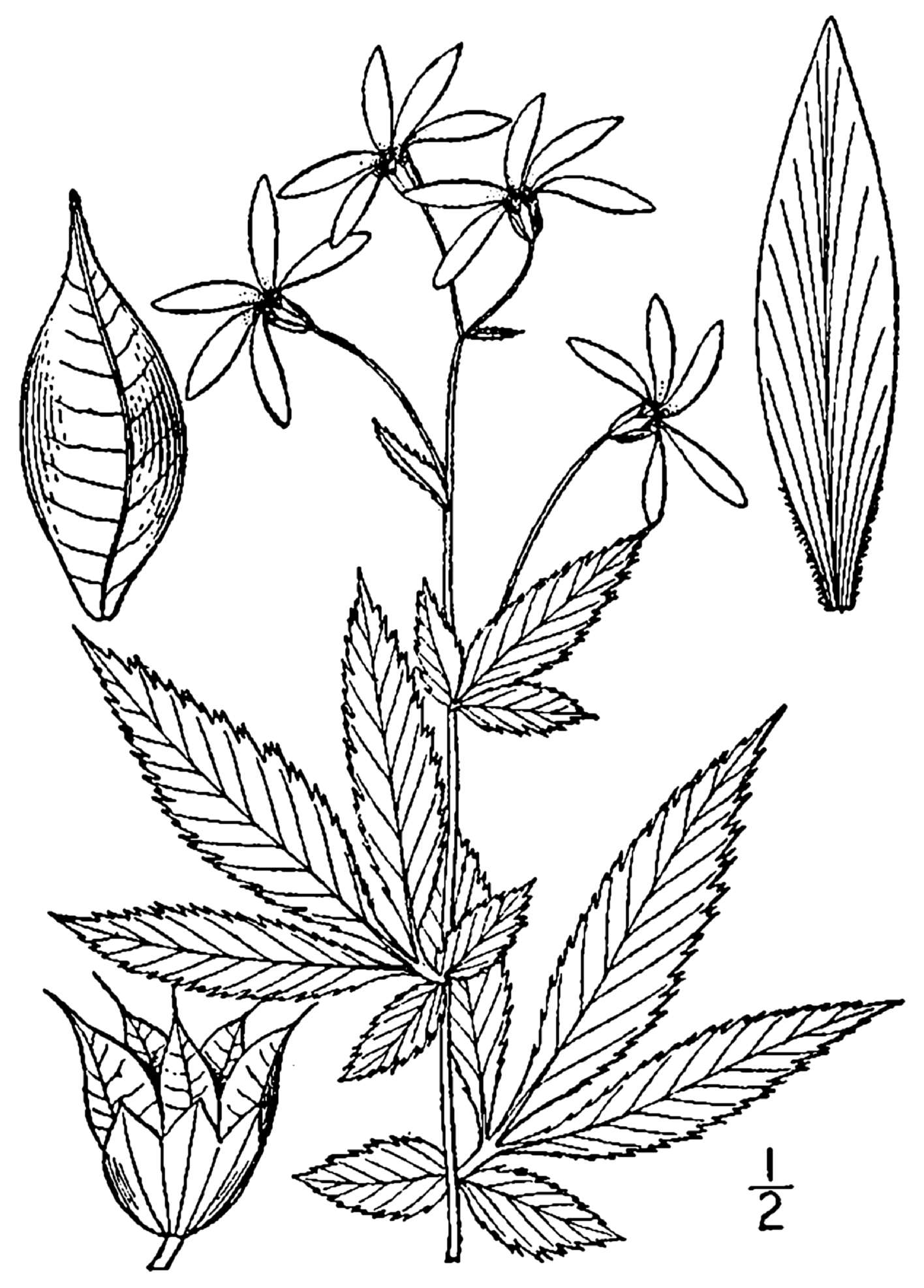
- Illustration from Nathaniel Lord Britton & Addison Brown's (1913) Illustrated flora of the northern states and Canada.

Scientific classification
- Kingdom: Plantae
- Clade: Tracheophytes
- Clade: Angiosperms
- Clade: Eudicots
- Clade: Rosids
- Order: Rosales
- Family: Rosaceae
- Genus: Gillenia
- Species: G. stipulata

Binomial name
- Gillenia stipulata (Muhl. ex Willd.) Nutt.

Synonyms
- Porteranthus stipulatus (Muhl. ex Willd.) Britton; Spiraea stipulata Muhl. ex Willd.

= Gillenia stipulata =

Species of plant

Gillenia stipulata, or American ipecac, is an herbaceous perennial plant in the genus Gillenia, in the family Rosaceae, native to the United States from Texas to the west and south, New York to the North, and North Carolina to the east. The species grows in dry uplands and open woods, usually on acidic soils. It reaches a height of about 1 metre (3.3 ft) and has white flowers with 5 very narrow petals spaced widely apart.
