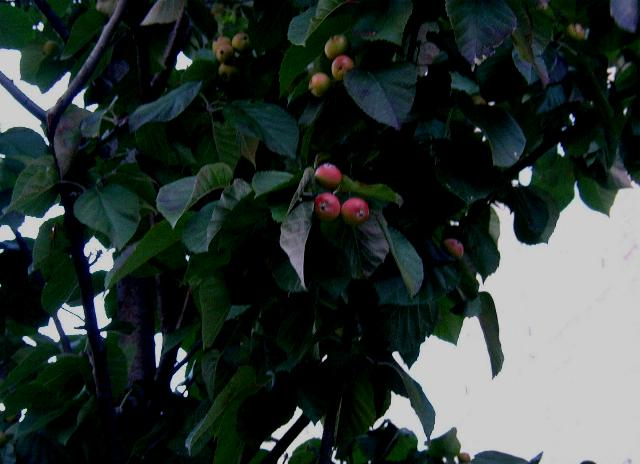

Conservation status
- Data Deficient (IUCN 3.1)

Scientific classification
- Kingdom: Plantae
- Clade: Tracheophytes
- Clade: Angiosperms
- Clade: Eudicots
- Clade: Rosids
- Order: Rosales
- Family: Rosaceae
- Genus: Macromeles
- Species: M. tschonoskii

Binomial name
- Macromeles tschonoskii (Maxim.) Koidz.

Synonyms
- Homotypic Synonyms: Cormus tschonoskii (Maxim.) Koidz.; Docyniopsis tschonoskii (Maxim.) Koidz.; Eriolobus tschonoskii (Maxim.) Rehder; Malus tschonoskii (Maxim.) C.K.Schneid.; Pyrus tschonoskii Maxim.; Heterotypic Synonyms: Pyrus tschonoskii hoggii Franch. & Sav.

= Macromeles tschonoskii =

Species of apple tree

Macromeles tschonoskii (common names Chonosuki crab and pillar apple) is a species of flowering plant in the family Rosaceae. It is a tree endemic to Japan.

The specific epithet tschonoskii refers to the 19th century Japanese botanist Sugawa Tschonoski.

== Description ==
Macromeles tschonoskii is a strong-growing deciduous tree, it has a distinctive columnar habit and is particularly noted for its autumn colouring, when the glossy mid-green leaves turn to brilliant shades of yellow, orange, purple and scarlet. Single white flowers, tinged pink, appear in May and are followed by rounded red-flushed yellow-green crabapples.

It can grow to 9 metres (30 feet) tall by 1.8 m (6 ft) broad in 20 years, with an ultimate height of 12 m (39 ft).

== Habitat ==
The species grows well in many soil types, doing best in moist, well-drained soil.

== Uses ==
It is cultivated as an ornamental tree, for planting in gardens.
