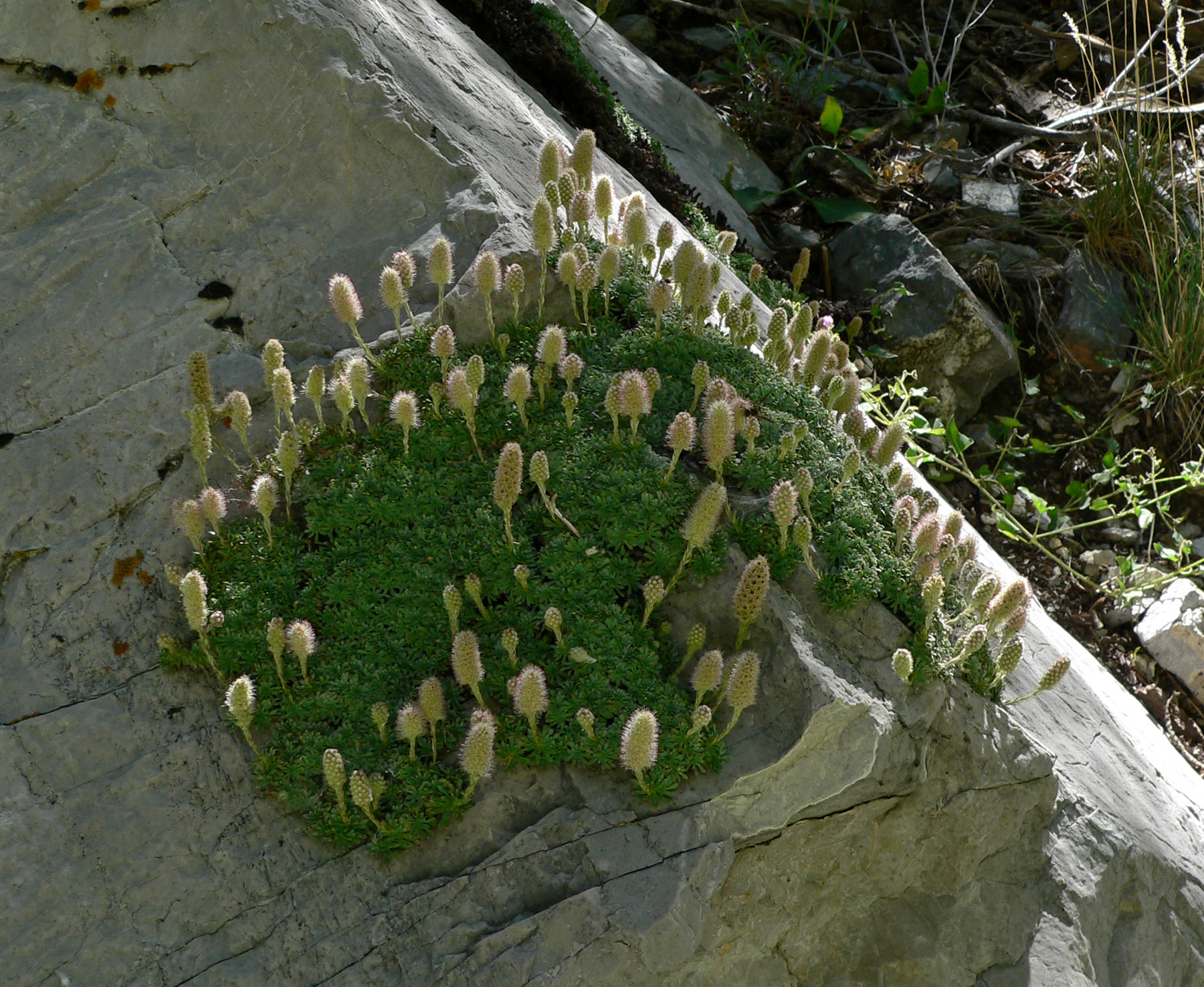
- subspecies caespitosum

Scientific classification
- Kingdom: Plantae
- Clade: Tracheophytes
- Clade: Angiosperms
- Clade: Eudicots
- Clade: Rosids
- Order: Rosales
- Family: Rosaceae
- Subfamily: Amygdaloideae
- Tribe: Spiraeeae
- Genus: Petrophytum
- Species: P. caespitosum

Binomial name
- Petrophytum caespitosum (Nutt.) Rydb.

= Petrophytum caespitosum =

Species of flowering plant

Petrophytum caespitosum (orth. var. Petrophyton caespitosum) is a woody perennial species of flowering plant in the rose family known by the common name mat rock spiraea and native to western United States.

== Range and Habitat ==
Petrophytum caespitosum is native to the Western United States where it grows in mountainous areas from the Sierra Nevada to the Rocky Mountains. It grows among limestone rocks in forested and woodland habitat and on open limestone bluffs and cliffs.

== Description ==
Petrophytum caespitosum is a very low matted shrub growing in carpets up to 80 centimeters wide, creeping over rocks. The plant often grows on vertical surfaces and hangs by its roots, which cling to cracks in rock. The stems are thick and very short, covered densely in rosettes of oval leaves. Both surfaces of the leaves are lightly covered in short fine hairs, which may not be obvious without close inspection. It produces many inflorescences which are spikelike clusters of flowers arising on erect peduncles up to 10 centimeters tall. Each inflorescence is packed with flowers, each with five tiny white petals, many whiskery stamens, and usually 5 hairy pistils. The flower parts dry and may fall away, leaving a cluster of developing fruits, follicles containing the seeds.
