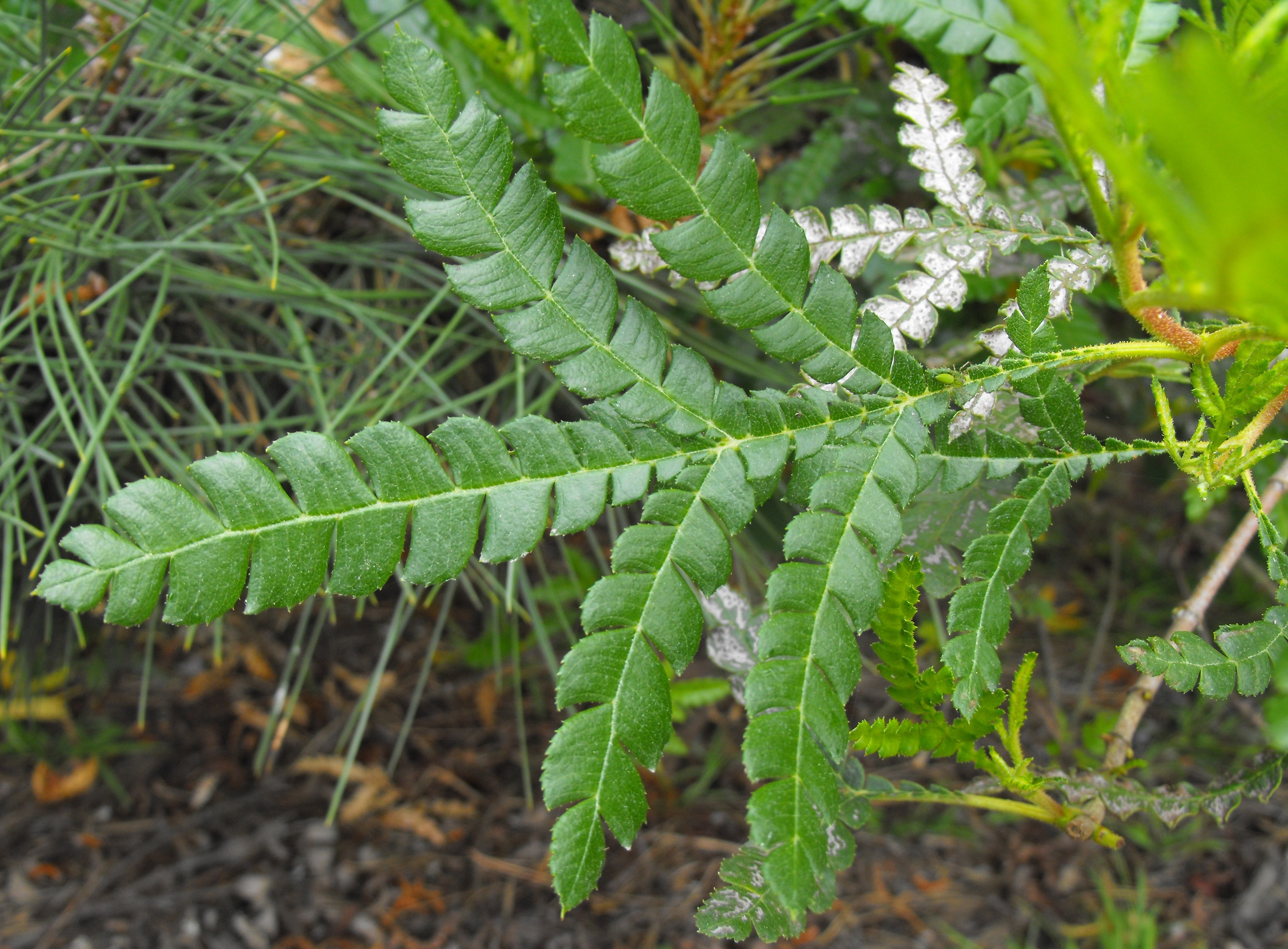
- Lyonothamnus floribundus subsp. aspleniifolius leaf

Scientific classification
- Kingdom: Plantae
- Clade: Tracheophytes
- Clade: Angiosperms
- Clade: Eudicots
- Clade: Rosids
- Order: Rosales
- Family: Rosaceae
- Subfamily: Amygdaloideae
- Tribe: Lyonothamneae
- Genus: Lyonothamnus; A.Gray
- Species: L. floribundus

Binomial name
- Lyonothamnus floribundus A.Gray

Subspecies
- L. floribundus subsp. aspleniifolius; L. floribundus subsp. floribundus

= Lyonothamnus =

Genus of trees

Lyonothamnus is a monotypic genus of trees in the rose family containing the single living species Lyonothamnus floribundus, which is known by the common name Channel Island ironwood, and the subspecies L. f. ssp. aspleniifolius and L. f. ssp. floribundus.

== Description ==
Lyonothamnus is endemic to the Channel Islands of California, where it grows in the chaparral and oak woodlands of the rocky coastal canyons.

This is a tree growing up to 15 metres (49 ft) tall with peeling reddish gray or brown bark. The evergreen leaves are shiny, dark green with lighter undersides, and borne on short petioles. The two subspecies have different leaf shapes. The inflorescence is a cluster of woolly white flowers with many short, whiskery stamens. The fruit is a pair of hard follicles.

In natural populations on the islands the tree grows in distinct groves. Isozyme analysis has determined that each grove is a clonal colony in the landscape. Each ironwood clone, or genet, is a group of genetically identical individuals comprising a dozen to several hundred tree trunks, or ramets. Later studies with DNA (RAPD) analysis also found that the trees are clonal.

Conservation

Because island ironwoods are clonal there are fewer genetic individuals on each island. Isolated clones in the steep rugged terrain can influence cross pollination. Limited cross pollination may be a reason for low seed production/viability observed in natural populations on the island.

Genetic integrity of each island’s population of Lyonothamnus floribundus is important. Care must be used by island resource managers to protect the genetic integrity of natural populations by prohibiting introduction of Lyonothamnus from other islands and/or the mainland (nursery stock). Two introductions of L. f. ssp. aspleniifolius have occurred on Santa Catalina Island and pose a threat to the native L. f. ssp. floribundus populations.

== Systematics ==
Lyonothamnus is currently a geographically restricted island endemic genus containing one species with two subspecies. Discoveries of fossils have suggested that the genus once comprised several species, all but one now extinct, which grew on the mainland in the southwestern United States.

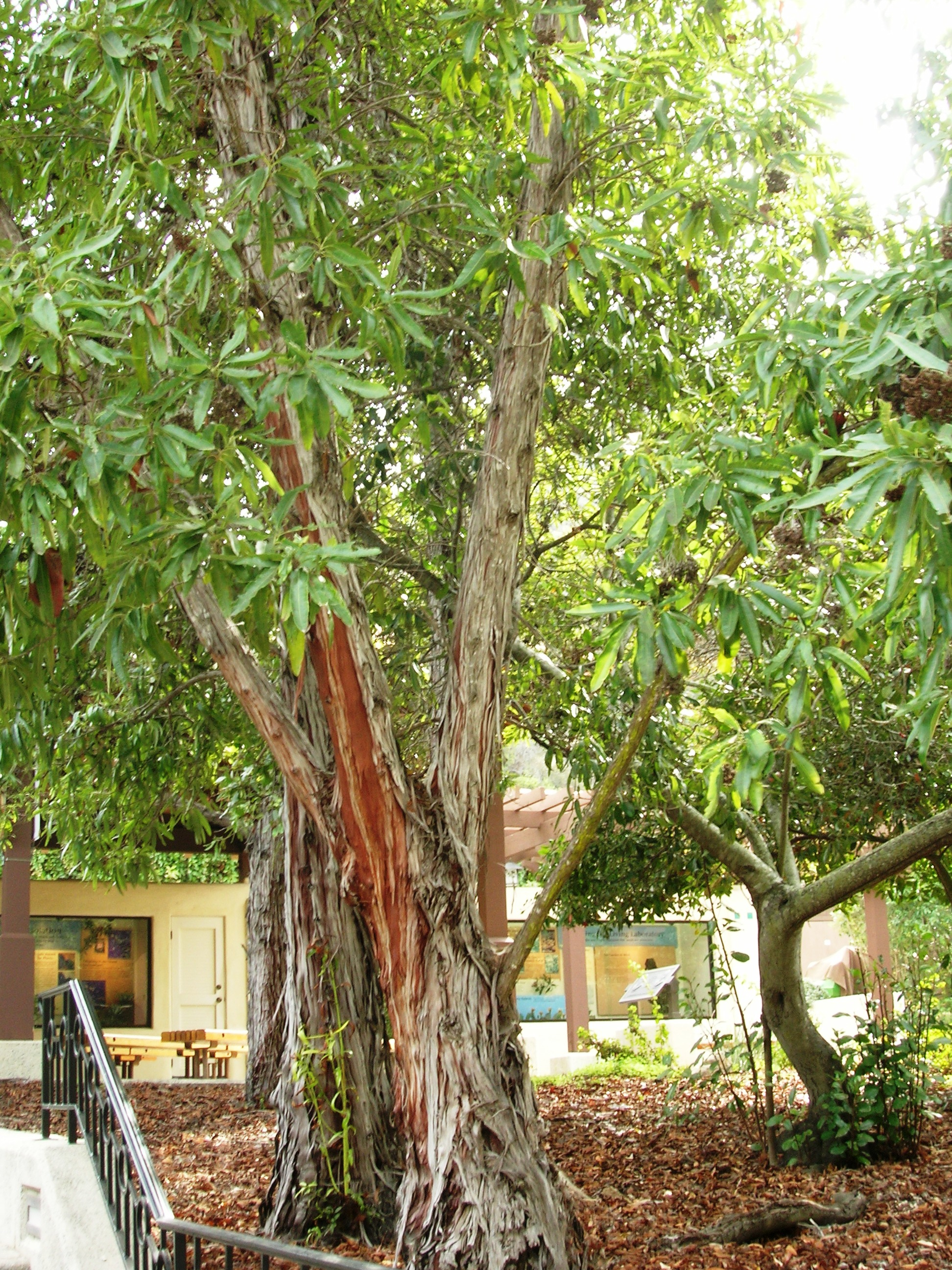
Lyonothamnus floribundus floribundus

=== Subspecies ===
There are two subspecies which have different leaf morphology, and geographic distributions.

- ssp. aspleniifolius is endemic to Santa Cruz, Santa Rosa, and San Clemente islands, and has palmately to pinnately compound leaves.
- ssp. floribundus is endemic to Santa Catalina Island Catalina Island, has simple linear to oblong, generally entire leaves with sometimes irregular lobes at the base of the leaf. Seedling leaves are often compound, but less so in one year old plus individuals.

Note: Spelling descrepency with L. f. ssp aspleniifolius it is spelled asplenifolius in Jepson Manual (book 1993) and spelled aspeniifolius in JepsoneFlora and Flora of North America.

== Cultivation ==
The Lyonothamnus ssp. aspleniifolius tree is grown in the horticulture nursery trade and used in landscape design; in drought tolerant, California native plants, traditional, and habitat-wildlife gardens; in public landscapes and private garden settings.

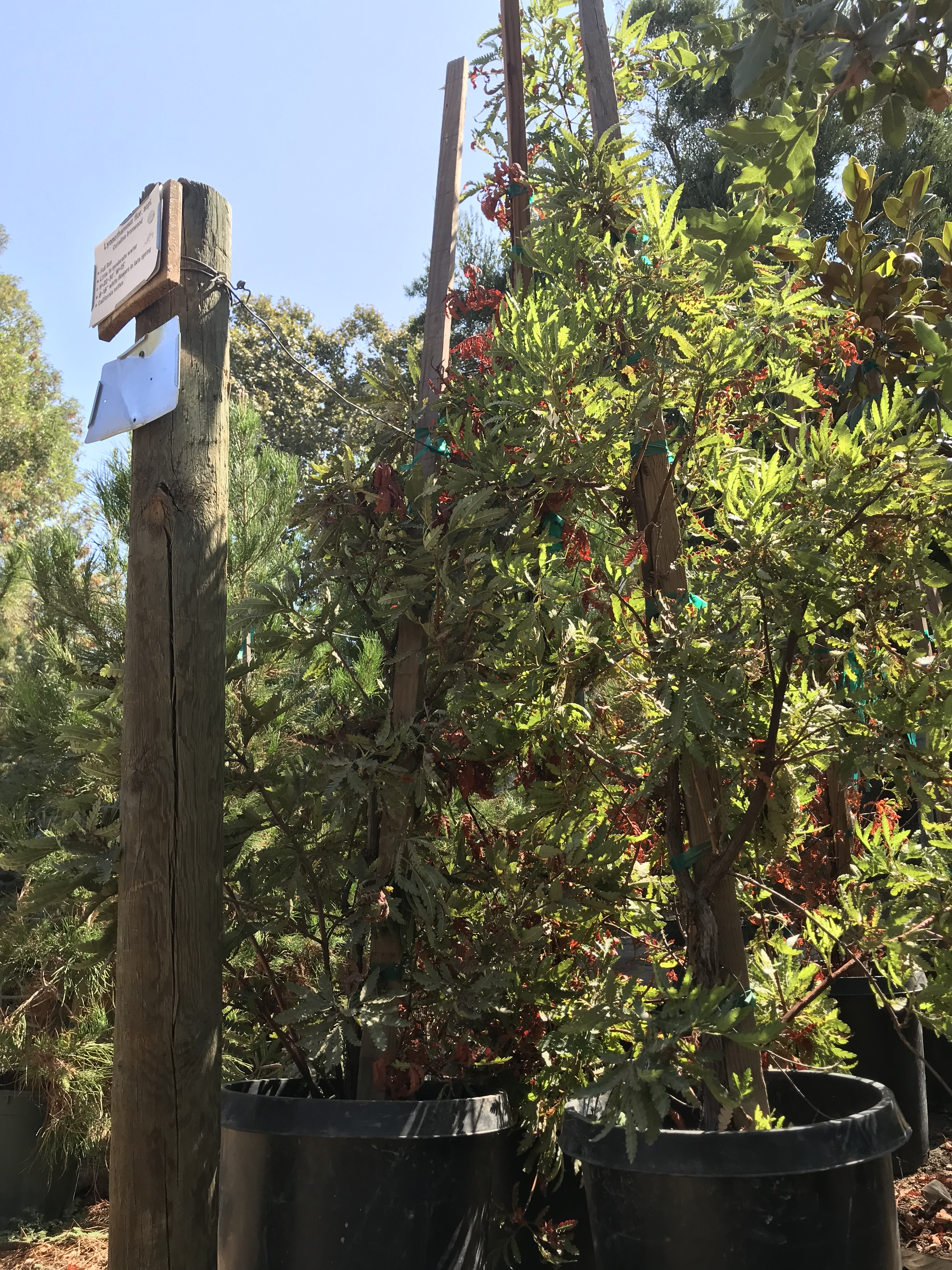
Catalina Ironwood seedlings for sale in Southern California
