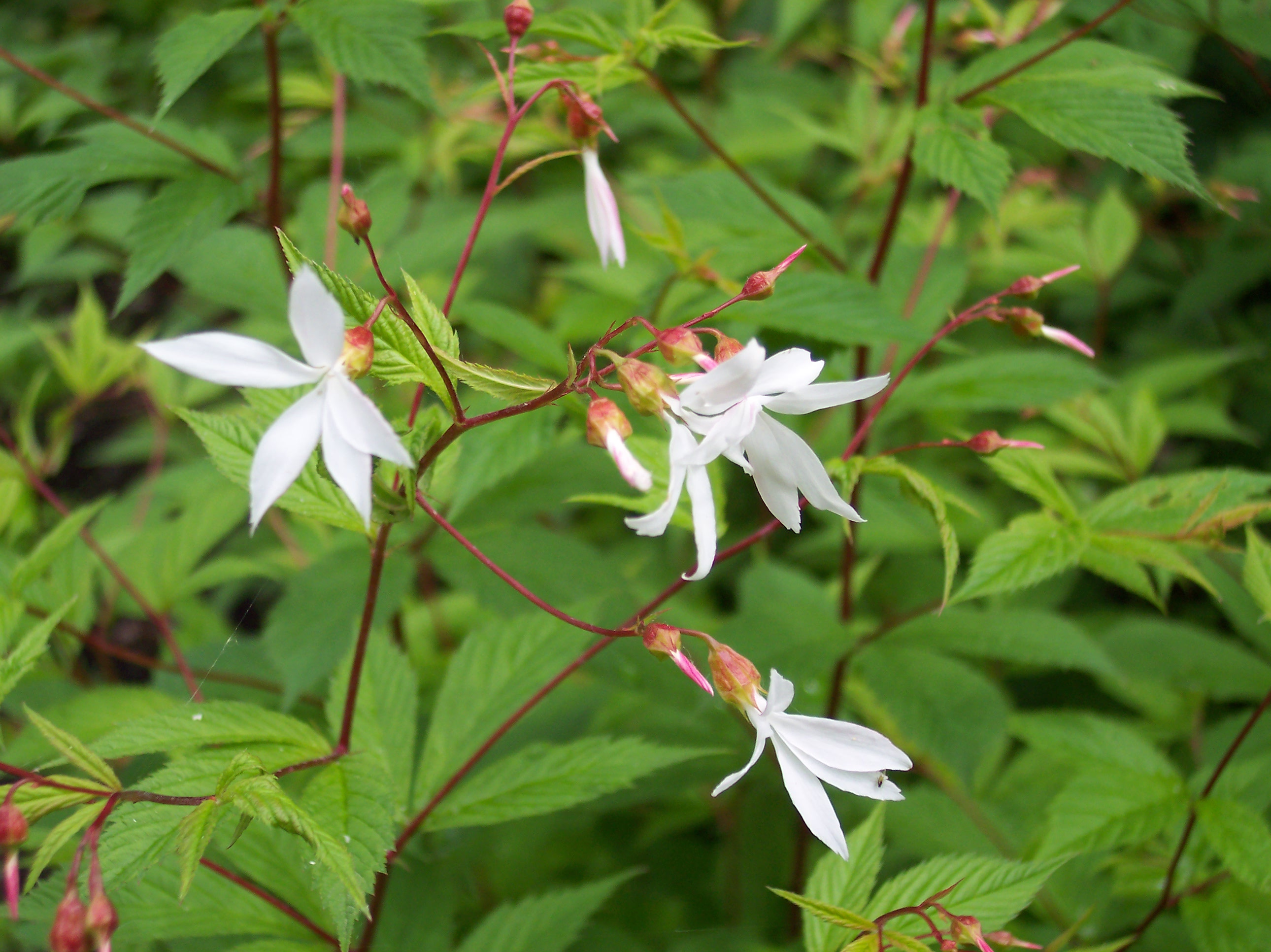

Scientific classification
- Kingdom: Plantae
- Clade: Tracheophytes
- Clade: Angiosperms
- Clade: Eudicots
- Clade: Rosids
- Order: Rosales
- Family: Rosaceae
- Genus: Gillenia
- Species: G. trifoliata

Binomial name
- Gillenia trifoliata (L.) Moench

Synonyms
- Porteranthus trifoliatus (L.) Britton; Spiraea trifoliata L.

= Gillenia trifoliata =

Species of flowering plant

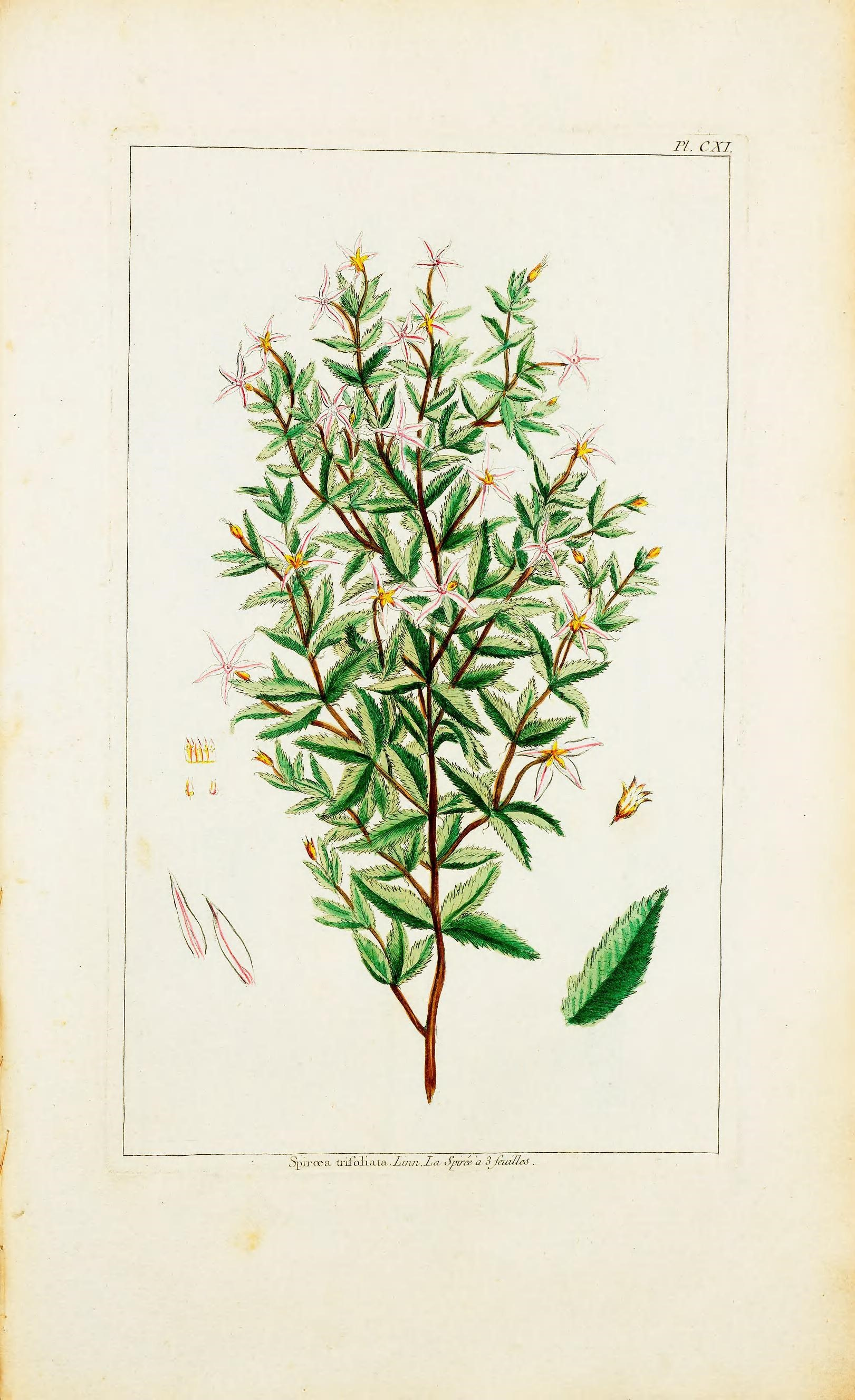

Gillenia trifoliata, common name Bowman's root or Indian physic, is a species of flowering plant in the family Rosaceae, native to eastern North America from Ontario to Georgia. It is an erect herbaceous perennial growing to 100 cm (39 in) tall by 60 cm (24 in) wide, with three lobed palmate leaves and pale pink flowers with narrow petals and reddish calyces above red coloured stems in spring and summer. Its habitat includes dry to moist upland woods and rocky banks.

In cultivation, this plant has gained the Royal Horticultural Society's Award of Garden Merit. It is very hardy to −20 °C (−4 °F) or lower, but requires a sheltered position in partial shade, with acid or neutral soil.

The root was dried and powdered by Native Americans and used as both a laxative and emetic.
