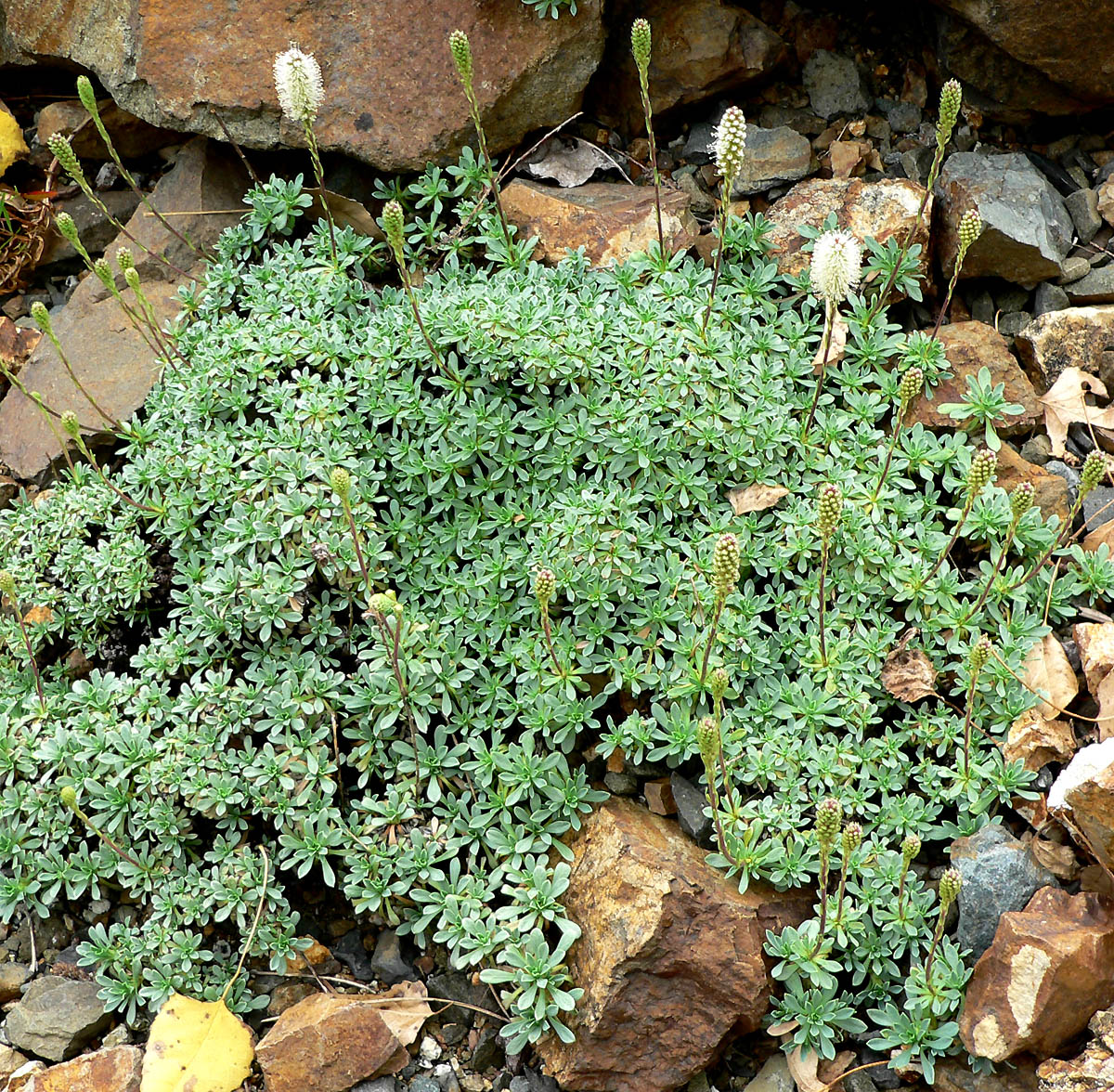
- Petrophytum caespitosum

Scientific classification
- Kingdom: Plantae
- Clade: Tracheophytes
- Clade: Angiosperms
- Clade: Eudicots
- Clade: Rosids
- Order: Rosales
- Family: Rosaceae
- Subfamily: Amygdaloideae
- Tribe: Spiraeeae
- Genus: Petrophytum (Nutt. ex Torr. & A.Gray) Rydb.

Species
- 4 - see text

= Petrophytum =

Genus of flowering plants

Petrophytum (orth. var. Petrophyton) is a small genus of plants in the rose family known as the rock spiraeas or rockmats. These are low mat-forming shrubs which send up erect stems bearing spike inflorescences of flowers. The brushy flowers are white and have many stamens and hairy, thready pistils. Rockmats are native to western North America.

Species:

- Petrophytum caespitosum — mat rock spiraea
- Petrophytum cinerascens — halfshrub rockmat, Chelan rockmat
- Petrophytum hendersonii — Olympic Mountain rockmat
