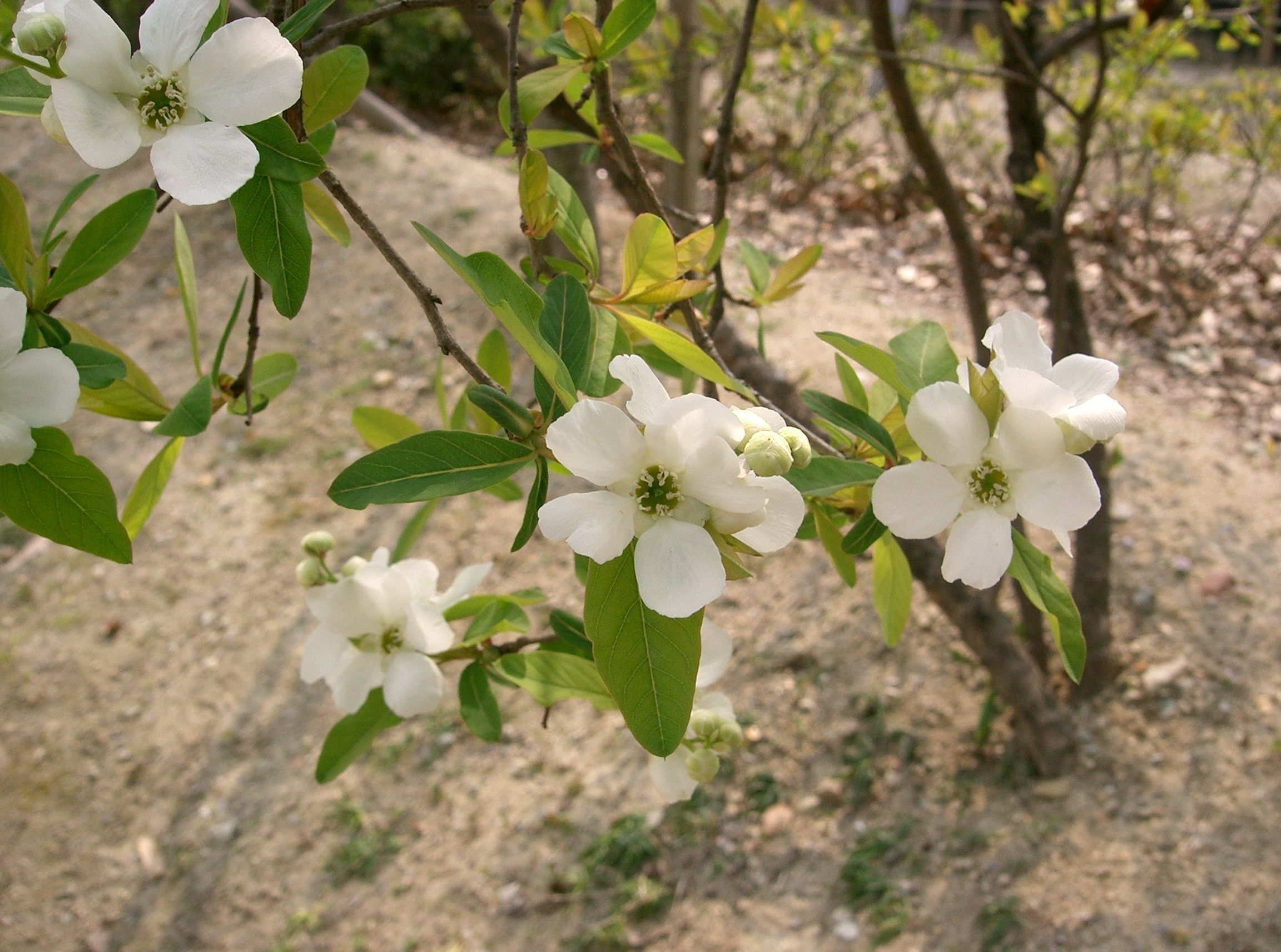
- Flowers of E. racemosa in Japan.

Scientific classification
- Kingdom: Plantae
- Clade: Tracheophytes
- Clade: Angiosperms
- Clade: Eudicots
- Clade: Rosids
- Order: Rosales
- Family: Rosaceae
- Genus: Exochorda
- Species: E. racemosa

Binomial name
- Exochorda racemosa (Lindl.) Rehder

Synonyms
- Exochorda racemosa subsp. racemosa; Exochorda racemosa subsp. giraldii; Amelanchier racemosa; "Exochorda giraldii"

= Exochorda racemosa =

Species of flowering plant

Exochorda racemosa, the pearlbush or common pearlbush, is a species of plant in the family Rosaceae. This species is mostly found in China and Japan.

== Taxonomy and etymology ==
Exochorda racemosa was first described by John Lindley. It is placed in the genus Exochorda and family Rosaceae, the rose family. The plant gets its common name, "common pearlbush", from its pearl-looking flowers.

== Description ==
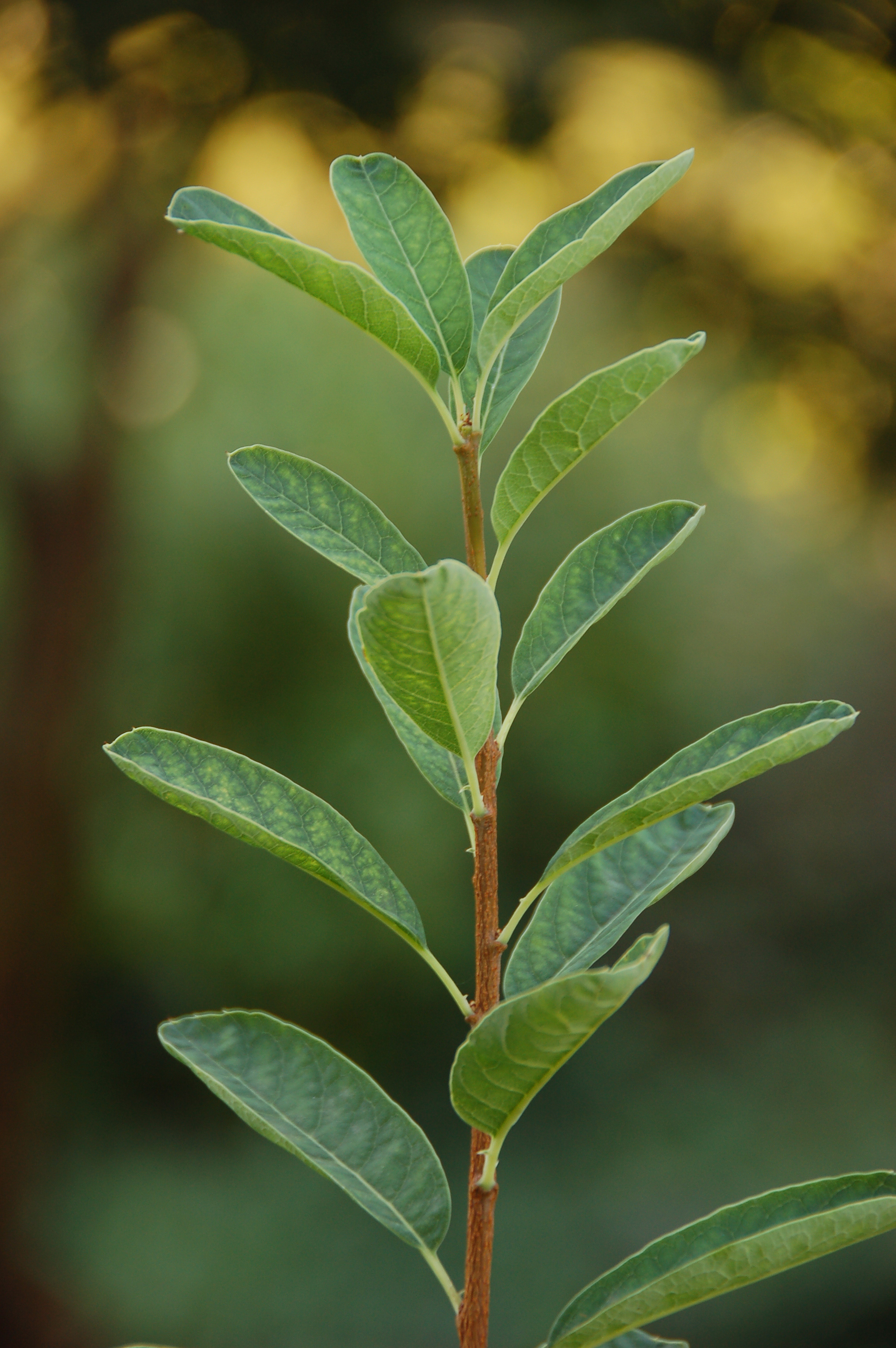
The foliage of E. racemosa.

A loose, irregular or vase-shaped and upright shrub, this species is deciduous. It has oblong leaves, about 4–6 cm (1.6–2.4 in) long and 1–2 cm (0.39–0.79 in) wide, that are rounded and toothed at the margin on the top. The flowers are white, and flower in late April to early May. The flowers have round petals, 12-25 stamens, borne in racemes in groups of about six or ten. Their diameter is 4 cm (1.6 in). Flowers give way to brown, dehiscent seed capsules.

== Subspecies ==
- Exochorda racemosa subsp. serratifolia (S.Moore) F.Y.Gao & Maesen – Korean pearl bush
