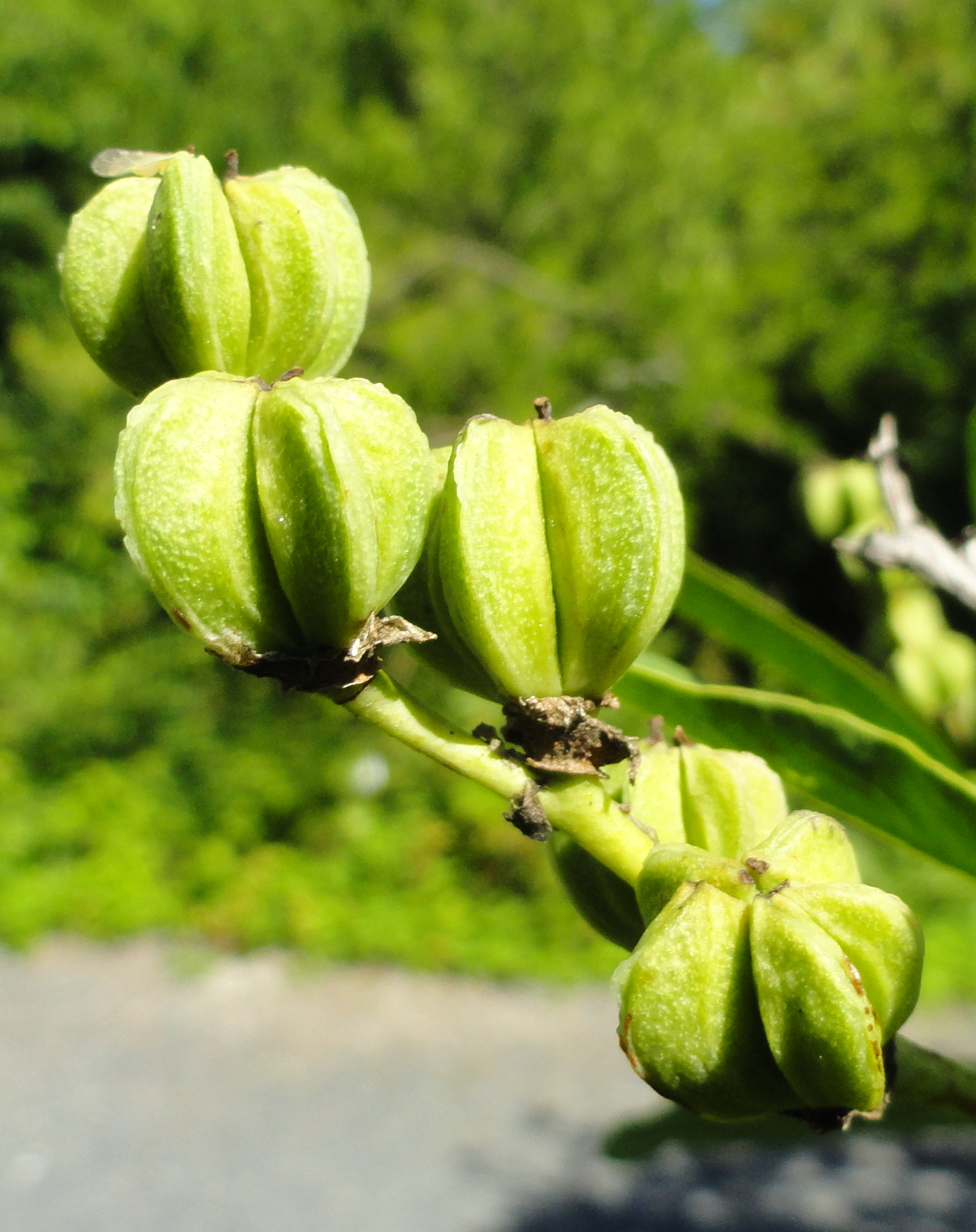
- Exochorda korolkowii

Scientific classification
- Kingdom: Plantae
- Clade: Tracheophytes
- Clade: Angiosperms
- Clade: Eudicots
- Clade: Rosids
- Order: Rosales
- Family: Rosaceae
- Subfamily: Amygdaloideae
- Tribe: Exochordeae
- Genus: Exochorda; Lindl.

Species
- E. albertii Regel; E. giraldii Hesse, China; E. grandiflora Lindl.; E. korolkowii Lavall., Turkestan; E. racemosa (Lindl.) Rehder; E. serratifolia S.Moore, China; E. tianschanica Gontsch.; or only: E. racemosa (Lindl.) Rehder (see text)

= Exochorda =

Genus of flowering plants

Exochorda /ˌɛksoʊˈkɔːrdə/ is a small genus of flowering plants in the family Rosaceae, native to China and central Asia (Turkestan). They are used as ornamental plants with the common name pearl bush, or pearlbush. Numerous species have been described on the basis of differing appearance and geographical separation, but a systematic study revealed that the different types are closely related and probably all descended from a single species that formerly had a wide distribution that has been fragmented by habitat loss. As a single species the correct name is E. racemosa.

== Description ==
They are deciduous shrubs growing 2–4 m (7–13 ft) tall. The leaves are paddle-shaped oval, 3–9 cm (1–4 in) long, with an entire or bluntly serrated margin. The flowers are white, with five petals, produced in spring on the ends of the branches. The fruit is a dry coccetum consisting of five fused carpels, which split to release the flattened seeds. Lindley wrote in the original description of the genus "The free placentary chords external to the carpels have suggested the name of the genus."

== Cultivation ==
A valuable garden hybrid is known as E. × macrantha C.K.Schneid. or Exochorda 'The Bride'. Lemoine's catalog of 1904 [as cited by C. K. Schneider, translated by Wikipedia] stated "We obtained this hybrid by fertilizing E. alberti with pollen from E. grandiflora. The clusters of flowers which terminate each shoot, are erect or horizontal, each one with 8 to 10 large flowers, well opened and unfolded, snow white. This new shrub has the vigorous growth of E. grandiflora. As an isolated specimen the effect is magnificent." This plant has gained the Royal Horticultural Society's Award of Garden Merit.

== Gallery ==
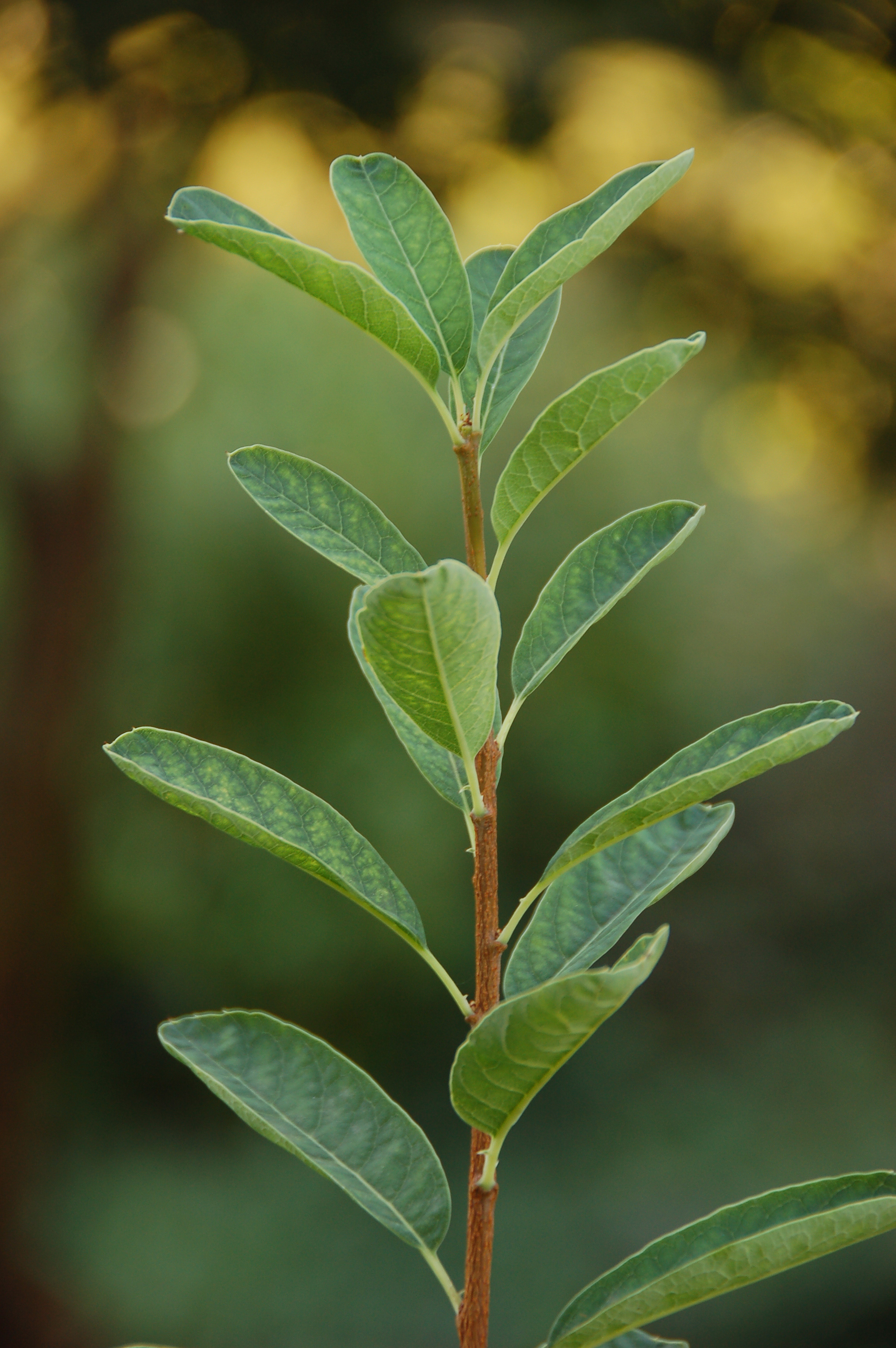
Leaves

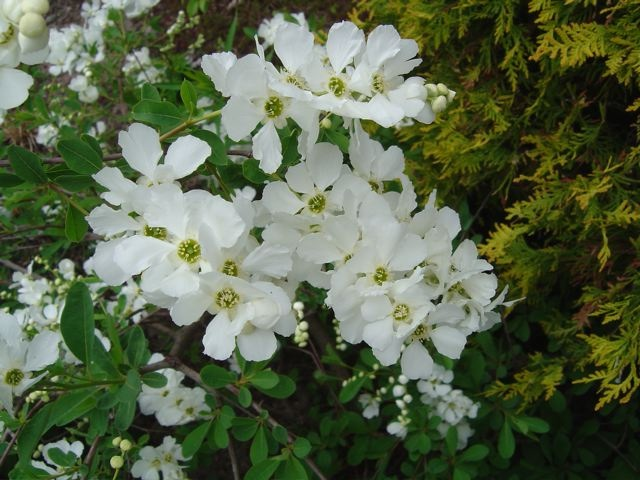
E. × macrantha 'The bride', flowers

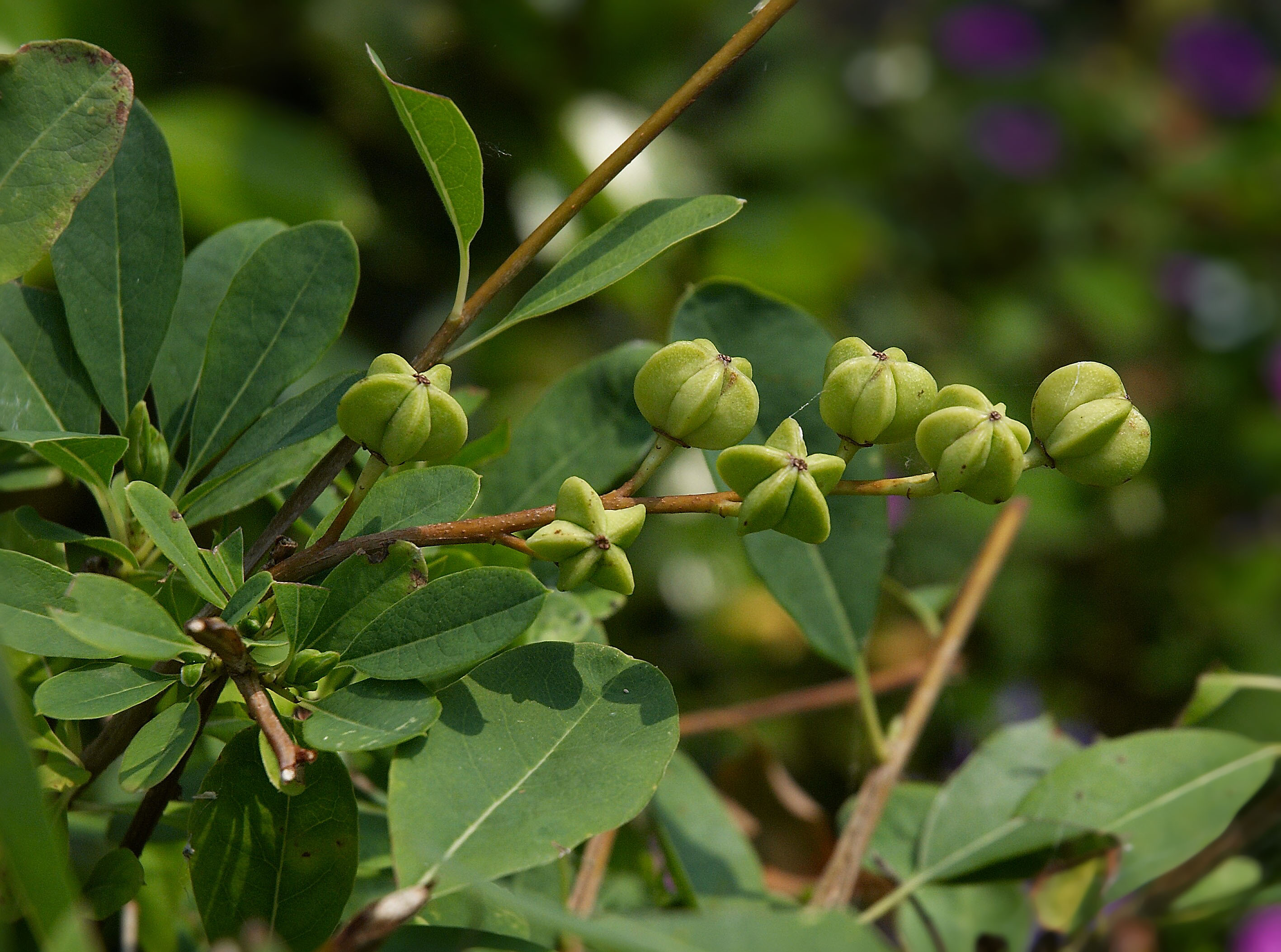
Young fruit

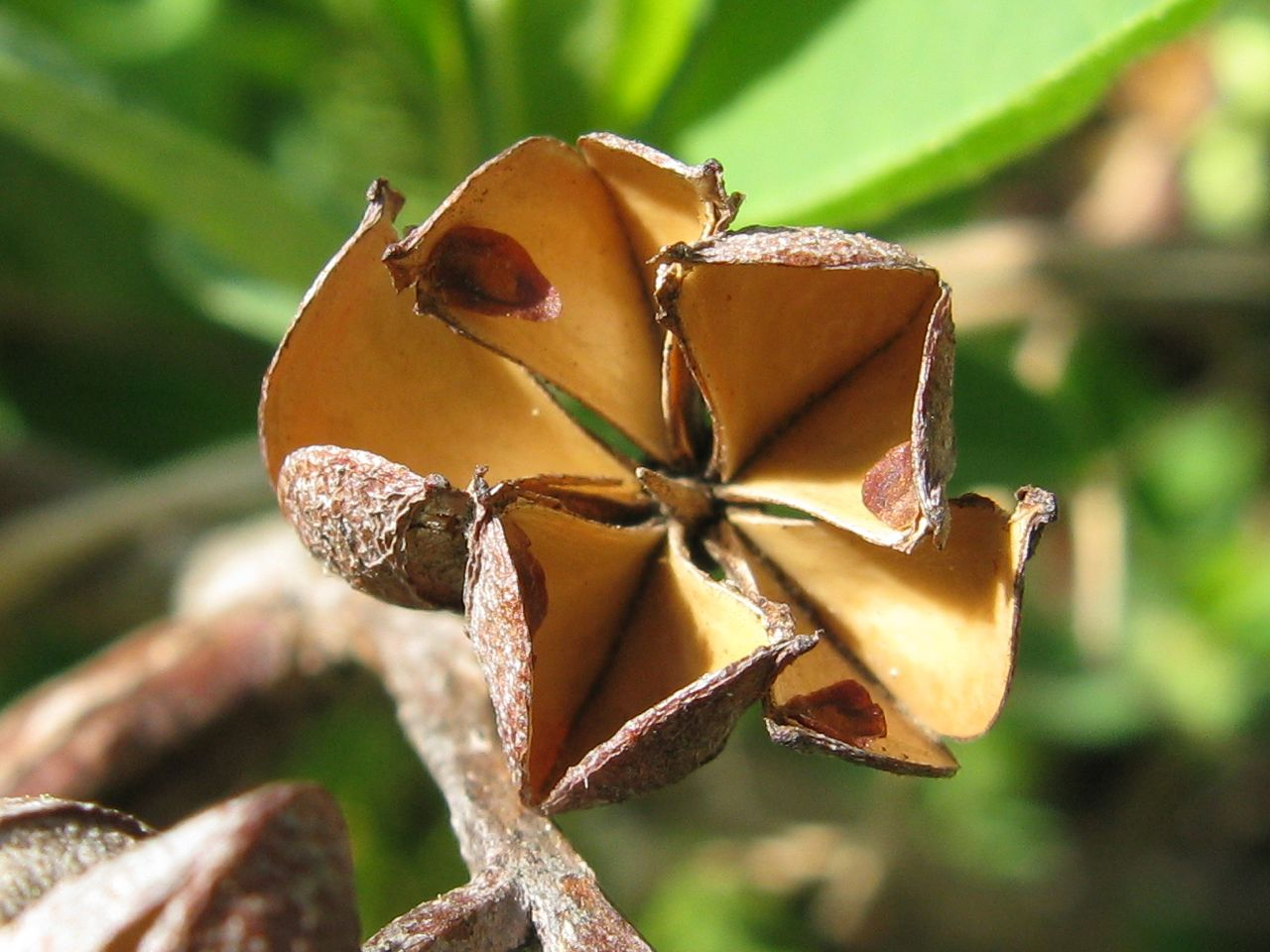
Fully open fruit after the seeds have dispersed
