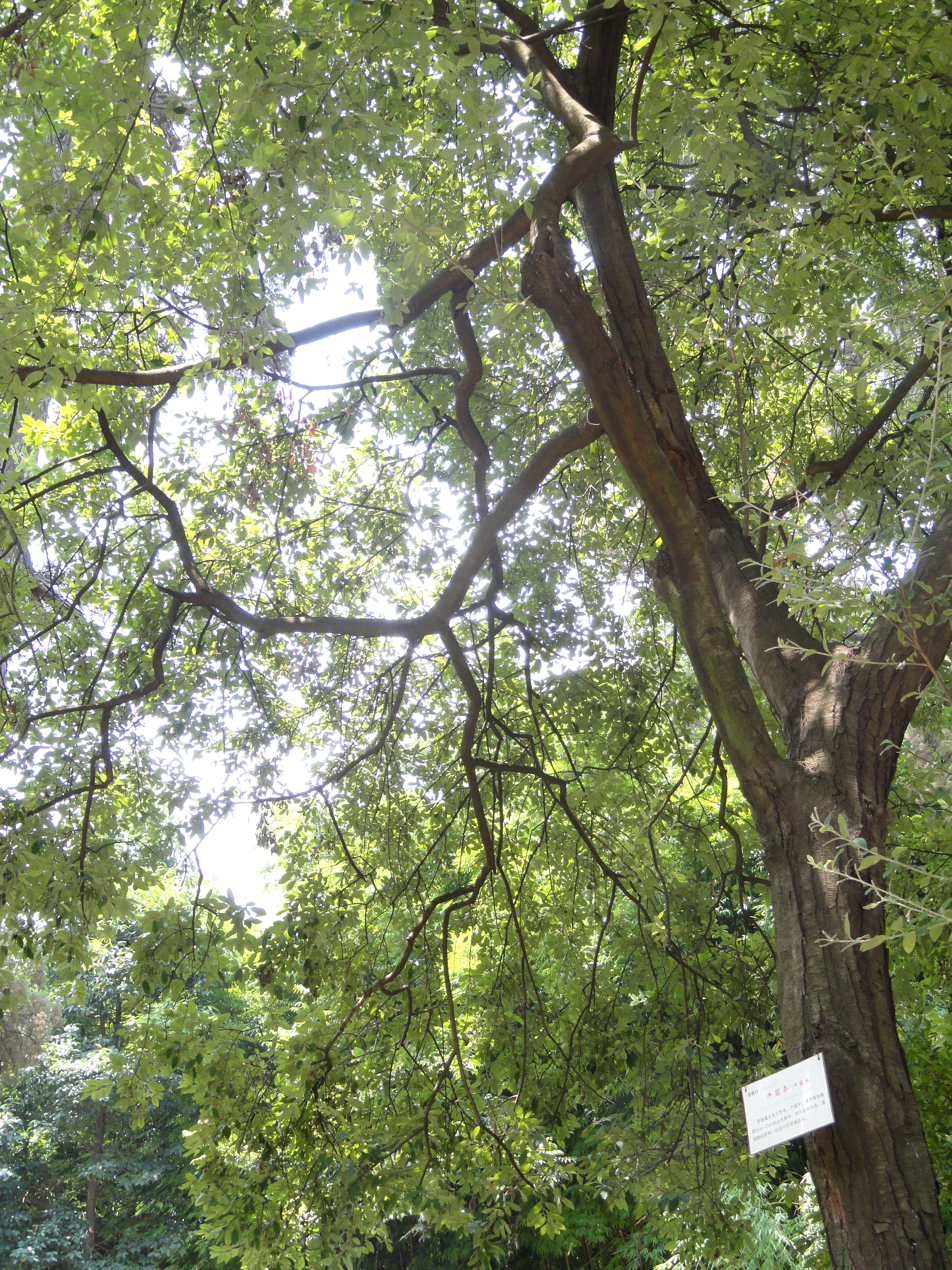
- Dichotomanthes tristaniaecarpa

Scientific classification
- Kingdom: Plantae
- Clade: Tracheophytes
- Clade: Angiosperms
- Clade: Eudicots
- Clade: Rosids
- Order: Rosales
- Family: Rosaceae
- Subfamily: Amygdaloideae
- Tribe: Maleae
- Subtribe: Malinae
- Genus: Dichotomanthes; Kurz
- Species: D. tristaniaecarpa

Binomial name
- Dichotomanthes tristaniaecarpa Kurz

= Dichotomanthes =

Genus of flowering plants

Dichotomanthes is a monotypic genus of flowering plants belonging to the family Rosaceae. The sole species is Dichotomanthes tristaniaecarpa. The flower is perigynous (sepals, petals and stamens around the edge of the ovary) the ovary is superior. The fruit of the plant is a dry achene.

== Description ==
It is a small tree shrub, which reaches a size of 2–7 m in height. Gray-brown to grayish-brown beds when they are old; ovoid buds, initially tomentose, gradually glabrescent, apex obtuse or acute. Petiole 4–6 mm thick, thickly tomentose yellowish white; stipules deciduous, filiform, limb elliptic to oblong-lanceolate, sometimes obovate or oblanceolate, 3–6 × 1.5–2.5 cm, with lateral veins in 7–12 pairs, the underside densely tomentose yellowish white. The inflorescences of 2–5 × 3–6 mm, rachis and peduncles tomentose yellowish white; deciduous, lanceolate, membranous bracts. Pedicel 1–3 mm. Flowers 5–9 mm in diameter. White petals, 3–4 mm. Red, cylindrical fruit of 5–7 mm, hard. Flowers from April to May, Fruits from August to November.

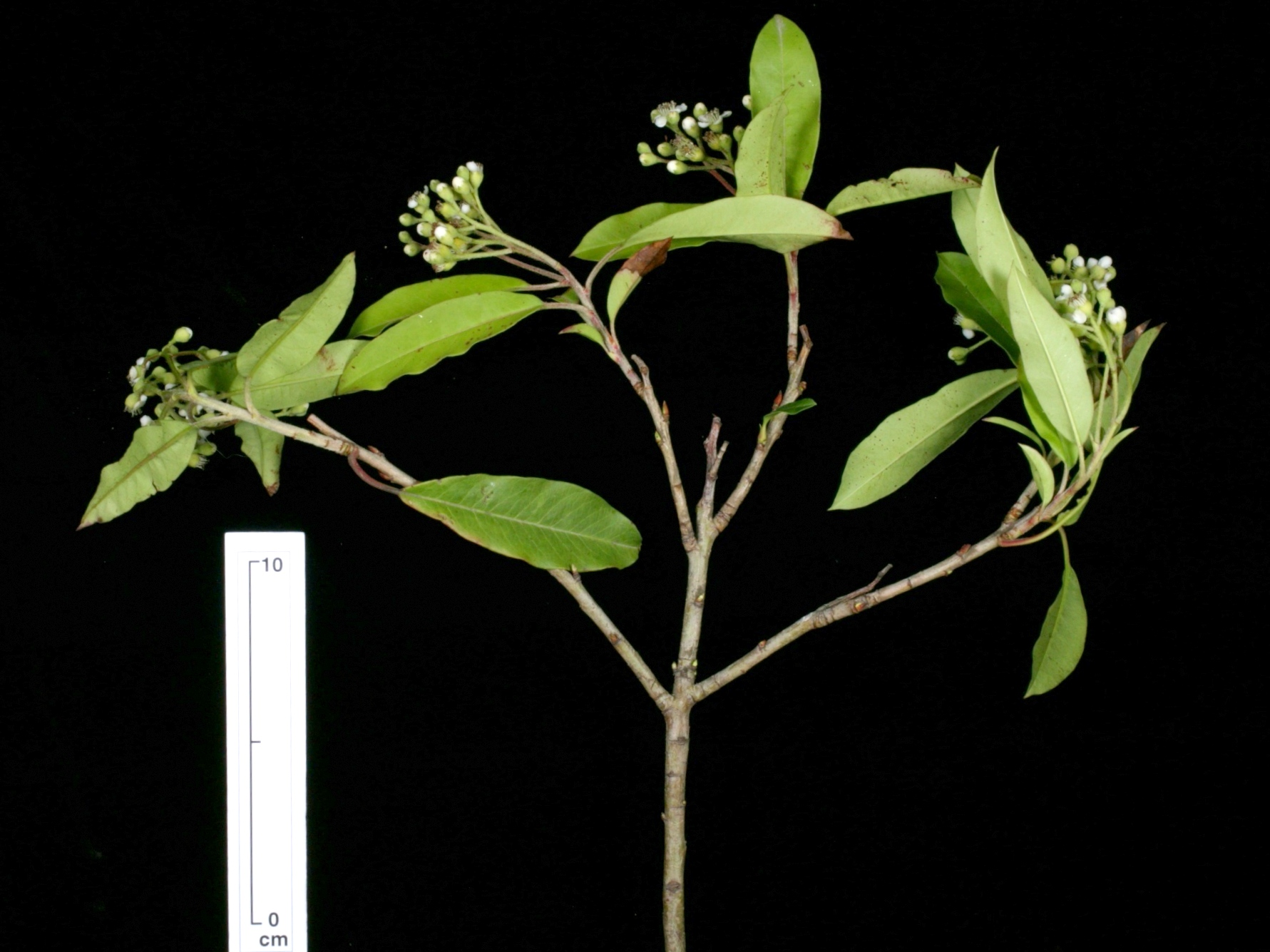
Branch with corymbs of flowers

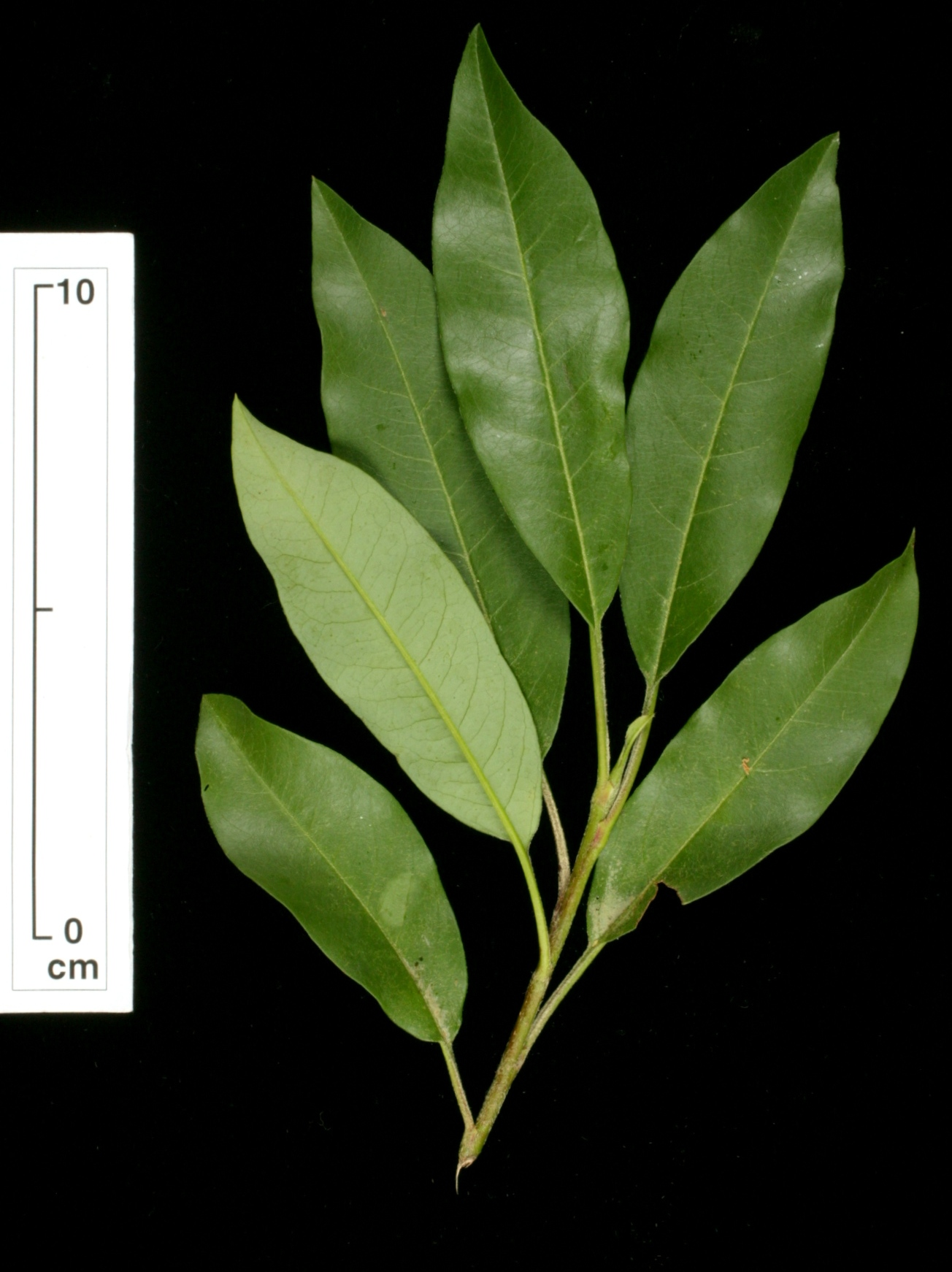
Leaves and leaf arrangement

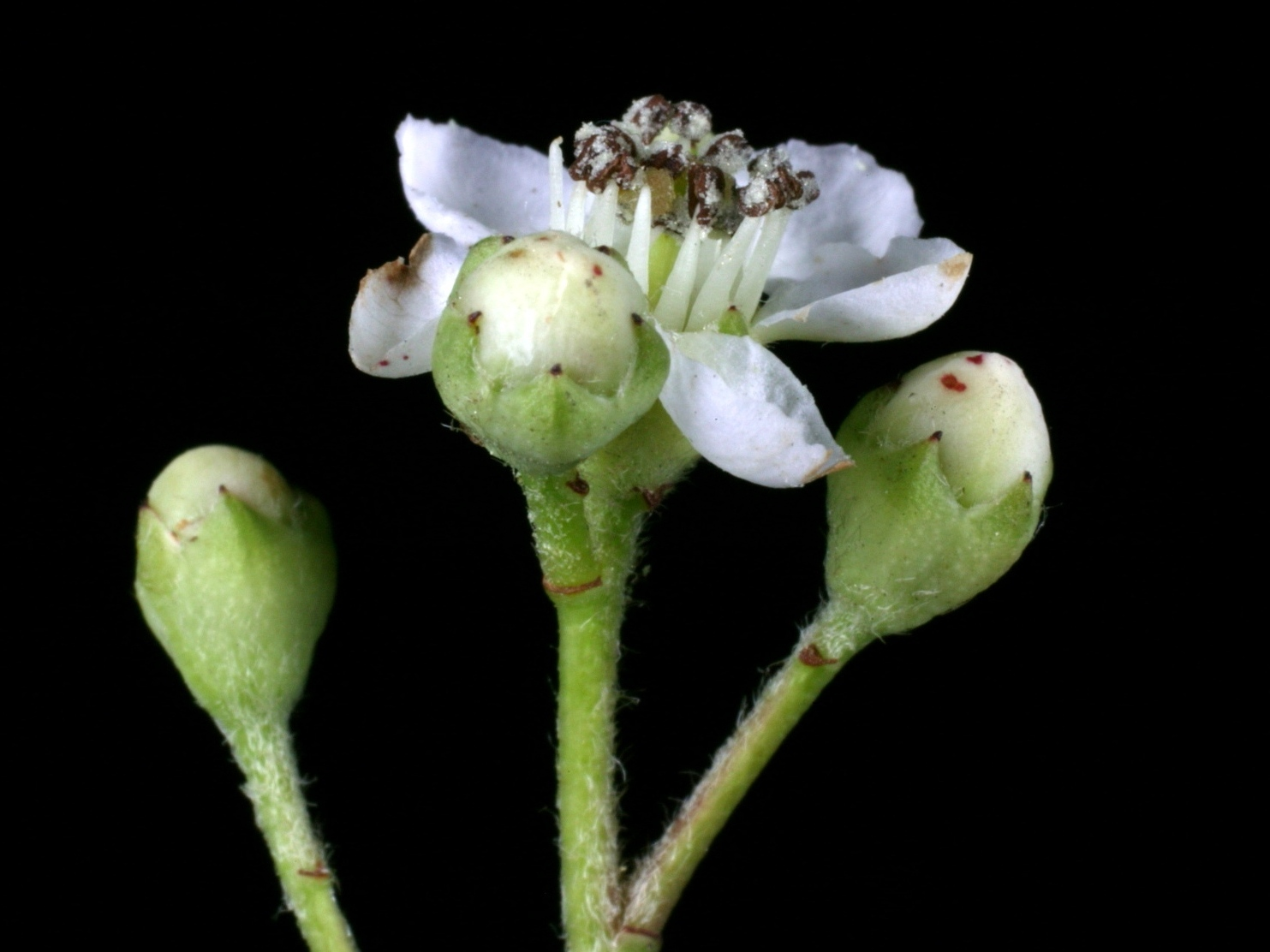
Open flower and flowers in bud

== Distribution ==
It is found in mixed evergreen forests, on the forest edges and hillsides, at elevations of 1300 – 2500 meters in Sichuan and Yunnan provinces of China.
