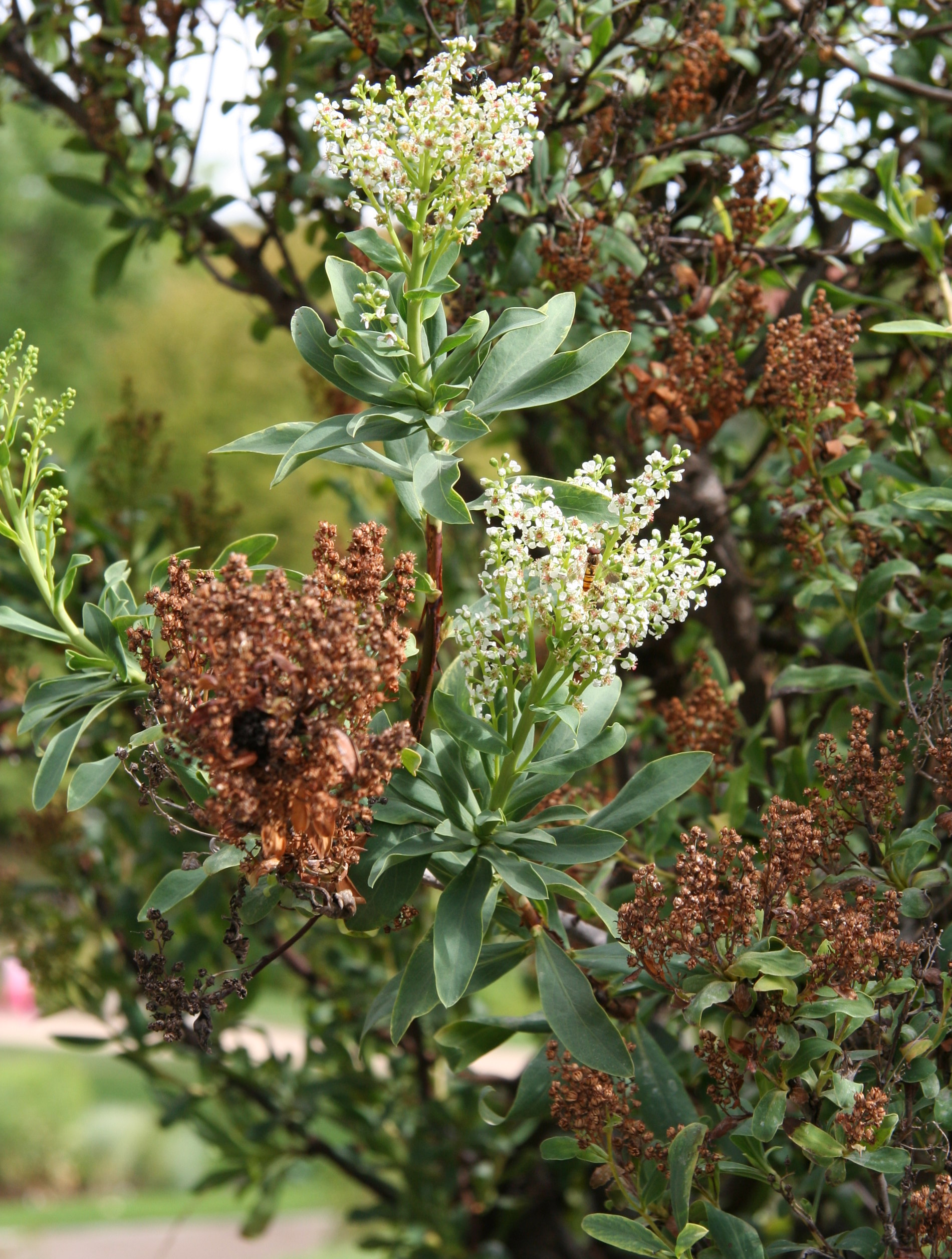
- Sibiraea laevigata

Scientific classification
- Kingdom: Plantae
- Clade: Tracheophytes
- Clade: Angiosperms
- Clade: Eudicots
- Clade: Rosids
- Order: Rosales
- Family: Rosaceae
- Tribe: Spiraeeae
- Genus: Sibiraea; Maxim.

Species
- See text

= Sibiraea =

Genus of Rosaceae plants

Sibiraea is a genus of flowering plants of the family Rosaceae, disjunctly found in the Balkans, Central Asia, and China. The type species is Sibiraea laevigata, which is occasionally cultivated as an ornamental garden plant.

== Species ==
Some authorities feel that there are insufficient differences between the described species, and that they should all be collapsed into Sibiraea laevigata. Species currently accepted by The Plant List, are as follows:

- Sibiraea angustata (Rehder) Hand.-Mazz.
- Sibiraea glaberrima K.S.Hao
- Sibiraea laevigata (L.) Maxim.
- Sibiraea tianschanica (Krasn.) Pojark.
- Sibiraea tomentosa Diels
