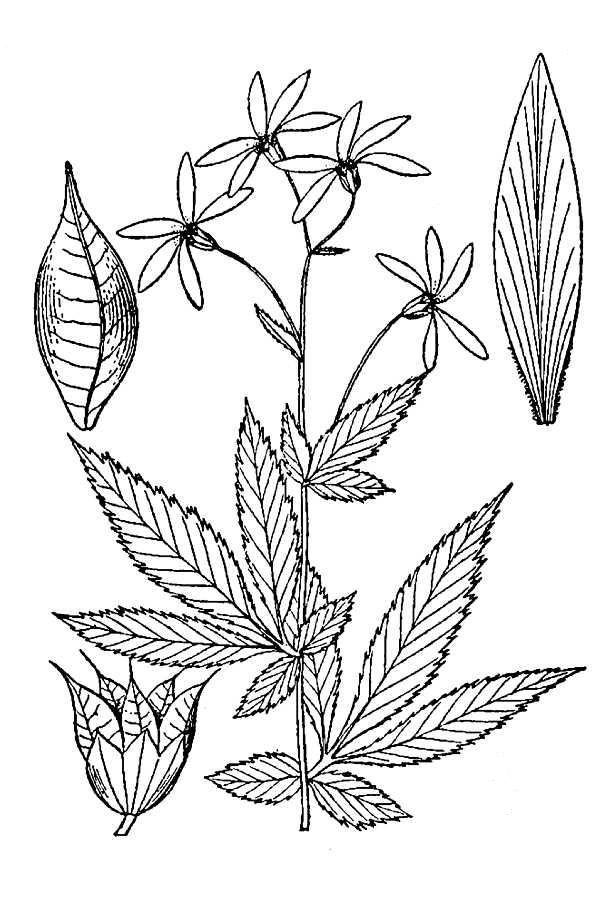
- Gillenia stipulata illustration from Illustrated flora of the northern states and Canada (1913)

Scientific classification
- Kingdom: Plantae
- Clade: Tracheophytes
- Clade: Angiosperms
- Clade: Eudicots
- Clade: Rosids
- Order: Rosales
- Family: Rosaceae
- Subfamily: Amygdaloideae
- Tribe: Gillenieae
- Genus: Gillenia; Moench

Species
- Gillenia trifoliata (L.) Moench; Gillenia stipulata (Muhl. ex Willd.) Nutt.

Synonyms
- Porteranthus (Britton ex Small) (nom. superfl.)

= Gillenia =

Genus of plants

Gillenia (syn. Porteranthus) is a genus of two species of perennial herbs in the family Rosaceae, Gillenia stipulata and Gillenia trifoliata. Common names for plants in this genus include: Bowman's root, Indian-physic, American ipecac. This genus is endemic to dry open woods with acidic soils in eastern North America. Both plants are subshrubs with exposed semi-woody branches and serrated leaves; the larger lower leaves are divided into palmately arranged leaflets. Plants bloom in May, June, or July; blooms are composed of five slender white petals which are loosely arranged and typically appear slightly twisted and limp as if they were wilted. The flowers mature into small capsules. G. stipulata and G. trifoliata are often planted as ornamentals and used in herbal medicine.

== Classification and name ==
Traditionally this genus is considered to be related to Spiraea, but it became apparent that it comes from the lineage which leads to tribe Maleae (which arose from within subfamily Amygdaloideae).

Gillenia has a haploid chromosome number of 9, while Maleae have a haploid chromosome number of 17 (which was probably produced from a Gillenia-like ancestor by doubling the genome and then losing a chromosome). Flower structure and fossil evidence also point to Gillenia sharing distinctive features with the Maleae. Another similarity between Gillenia and Maleae is susceptibility to Phragmidium fungus. Differences between Gillenia and Maleae include the chromosome number and the latter being solely woody pome bearing plants, while Gillenia is herbaceous and has a dry follicular fruit.

The name Porteranthus (Britton ex Small), named for Thomas Conrad Porter, has sometimes been used for this genus. The name Gillenia was thought to be already occupied by Gillena, a very similar name used by Michel Adanson as a synonym for Clethra (under the International Code of Nomenclature for algae, fungi, and plants "names that are so similar that they are likely to be confused" should be treated as homonyms^{Art. 53.3-5}). However, a proposal to formally conserve Gillenia was mooted after it was determined that Gillena was not validly published and a vote at the International Botanical Congress decided that it and Gillenia were not likely to be confused. Thus, Gillenia is the correct name (and Porteranthus was validly published but is superfluous and illegitimate^{Art. 52.1}).

== Species ==
The two similar species can be distinguished by their stipules. In G. stipulata, the stipules at the base of the leaves, which are round and deeply toothed, persist throughout the life of the plant. In G. trifoliata the long slender stipules are quickly deciduous, this species also tends to have longer leaves and petals.

- Gillenia trifoliata or Porteranthus trifoliatus—mountain Indian physic, Bowman’s root
- Gillenia stipulata or Porteranthus stipulatus—Indian physic, American ipecac

== Images ==
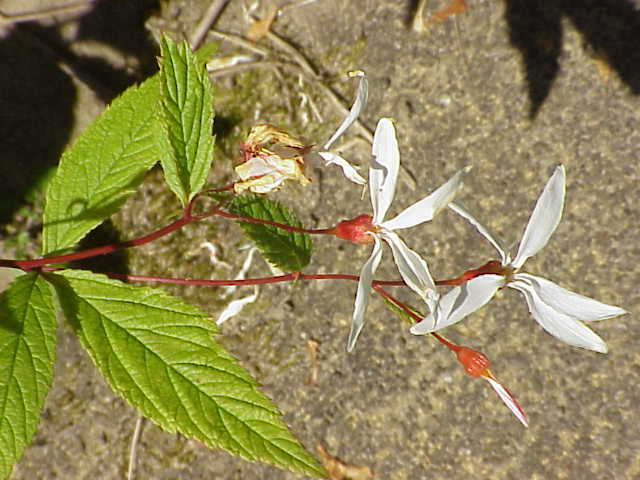
Gillenia trifoliata flowers

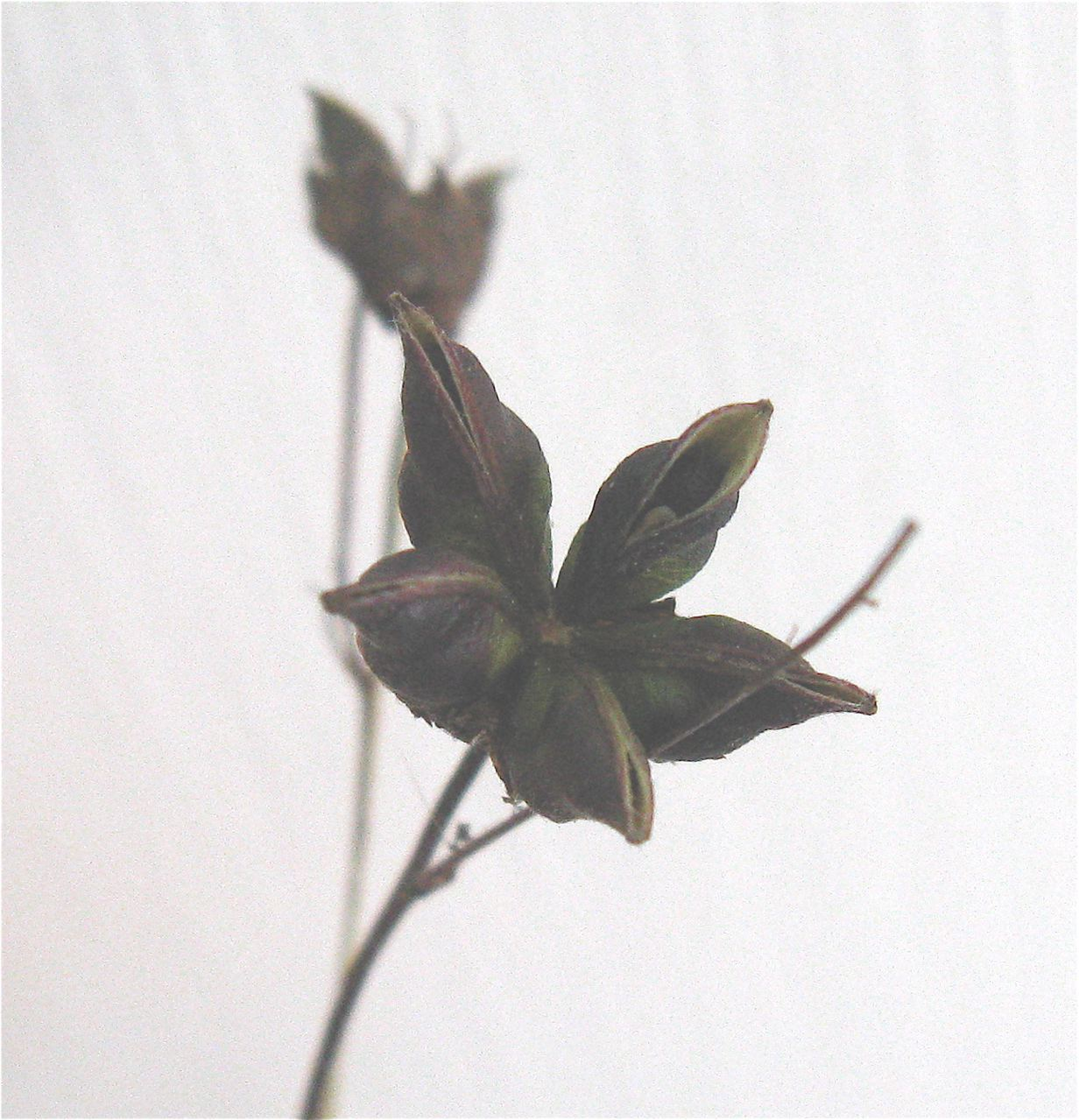
Mature fruit, an aggregate of follicles
