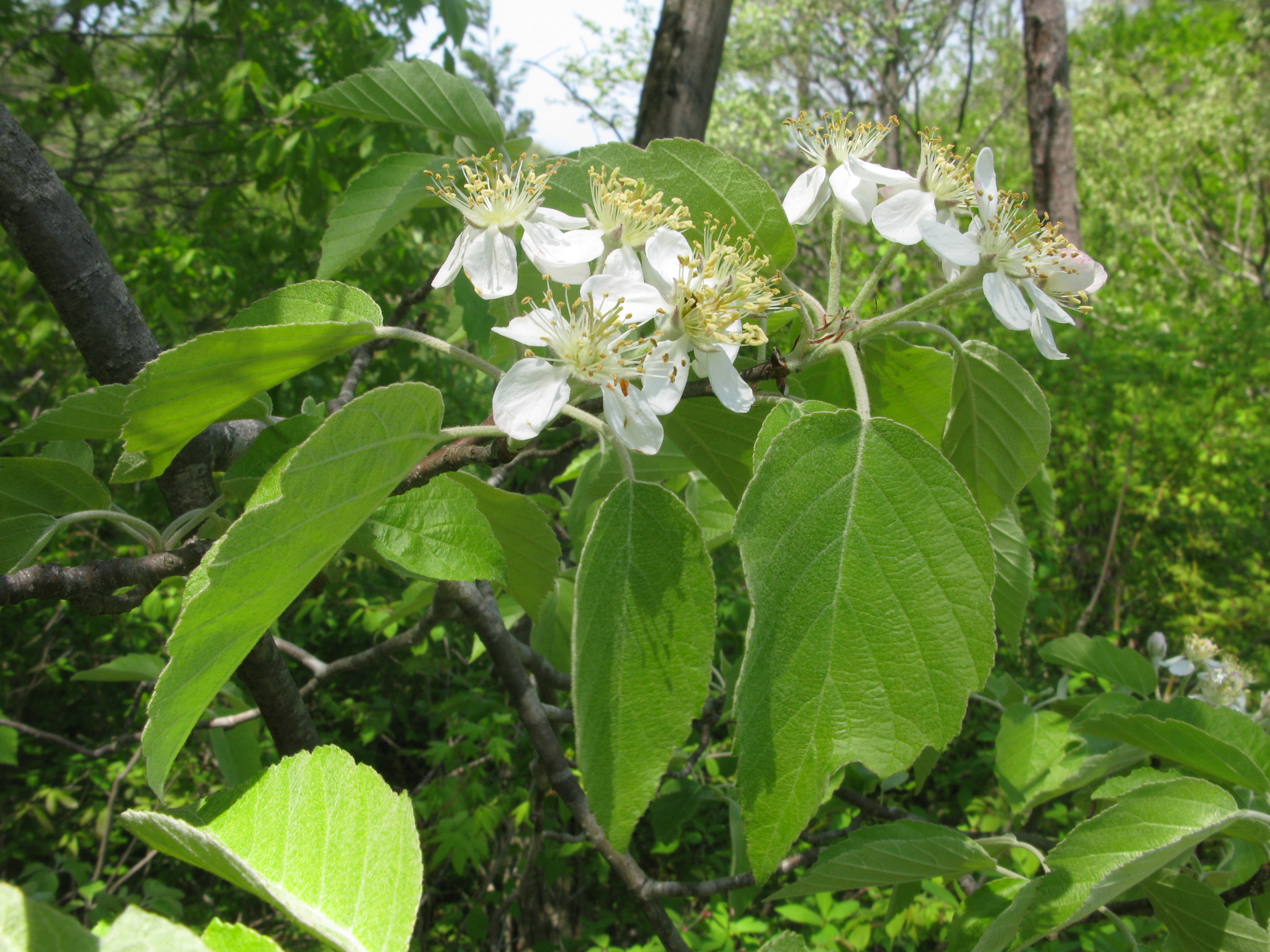
- Macromeles tschonoskii

Scientific classification
- Kingdom: Plantae
- Clade: Tracheophytes
- Clade: Angiosperms
- Clade: Eudicots
- Clade: Rosids
- Order: Rosales
- Family: Rosaceae
- Genus: Macromeles; Koidz. (1930)

Species
- Macromeles formosana Koidz.; Macromeles tschonoskii (Maxim.) Koidz.

Synonyms
- Docyniopsis (C.K.Schneid.) Koidz. (1934)

= Macromeles =

Genus of flowering plants

Macromeles is a genus of flowering plants in the rose family, Rosaceae. It includes two species native to Asia.

- Macromeles formosana Koidz. – Taiwan
- Macromeles tschonoskii (Maxim.) Koidz. – Japan
