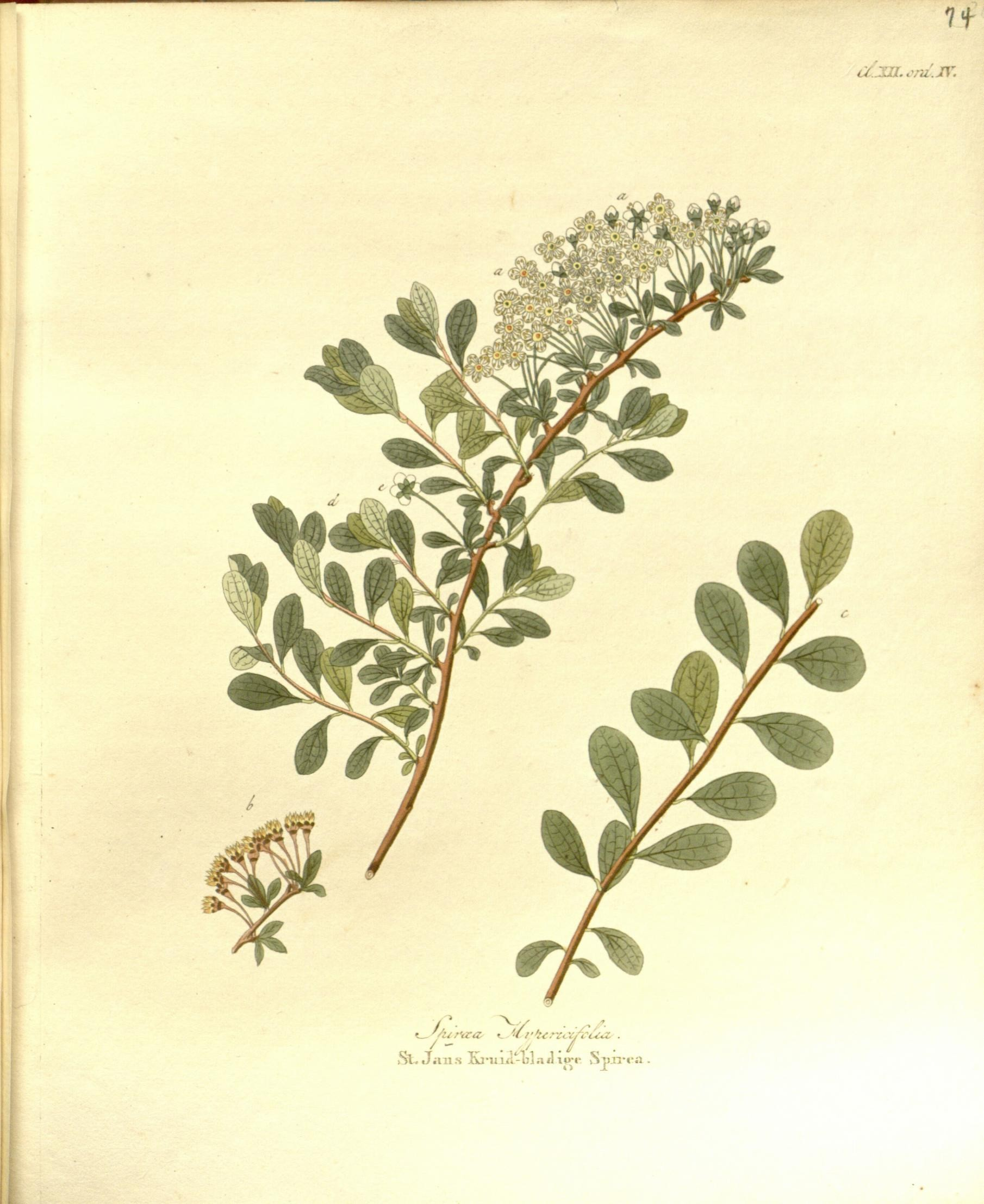
- Spiraea hypericifolia

Scientific classification
- Kingdom: Plantae
- Clade: Tracheophytes
- Clade: Angiosperms
- Clade: Eudicots
- Clade: Rosids
- Order: Rosales
- Family: Rosaceae
- Subfamily: Amygdaloideae
- Tribe: Spiraeeae

= Spiraeeae =

Tribe of flowering plants

Spiraeeae is a tribe of the rose family, Rosaceae, belonging to the subfamily Amygdaloideae.
