= List of Rosaceae genera =

There are approximatively 100–160 genera and 3,500–4,000 species in the family Rosaceae. Plants of the World Online currently accepts 99 genera.

== A ==
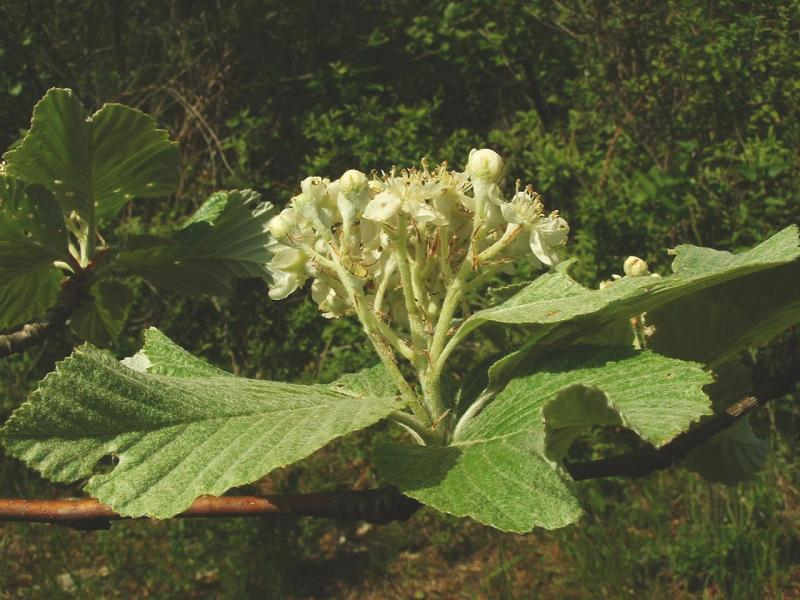
A whitebeam, genus Aria

- Acaena Mutis ex L.
- Adenostoma Hook. & Arn.
- Agrimonia L.
- Alchemilla L.
- Alniaria Rushforth – synonym of Micromeles
- Amelanchier Medik.
- × Amelasorbus Rehder
- Aphanes L. – synonym of Alchemilla
- Argentina Hill
- Aria (Pers.) J.Jacq. ex Host
- Aronia Medik.
- × Arsorbus Su Liu & Z.H.Feng
- Aruncus L.

== B ==
- Bencomia Webb & Berthel.
- Brachycaulos Dikshit & Panigrahi – synonym of Saxifraga

== C ==
- Cercocarpus Kunth
- Chaenomeles Lindl.
- Chamaebatia Benth.
- Chamaebatiaria (Porter ex W.H.Brewer & S.Watson) Maxim.
- Chamaecallis Smedmark
- Chamaemeles Lindl.
- Chamaemespilus Medik. – synonym of Aria
- Chamaerhodos Bunge
- Cliffortia L.
- Coleogyne Torr.
- Coluria R.Br.
- Comarum L.
- Cormus Spach
- Cotoneaster Medik.
- + Crataegomespilus
- Crataegus L.
- × Crataemespilus E.G.Camus – synonym of Crataegus
- Cydonia Mill.

== D ==
- Dasiphora Raf.
- Dichotomanthes Kurz
- Docynia Decne. – synonym of Malus
- Dryas L.
- Drymocallis Fourr. ex Rydb.
- Dunnaria Rushforth – synonym of Micromeles

== E ==
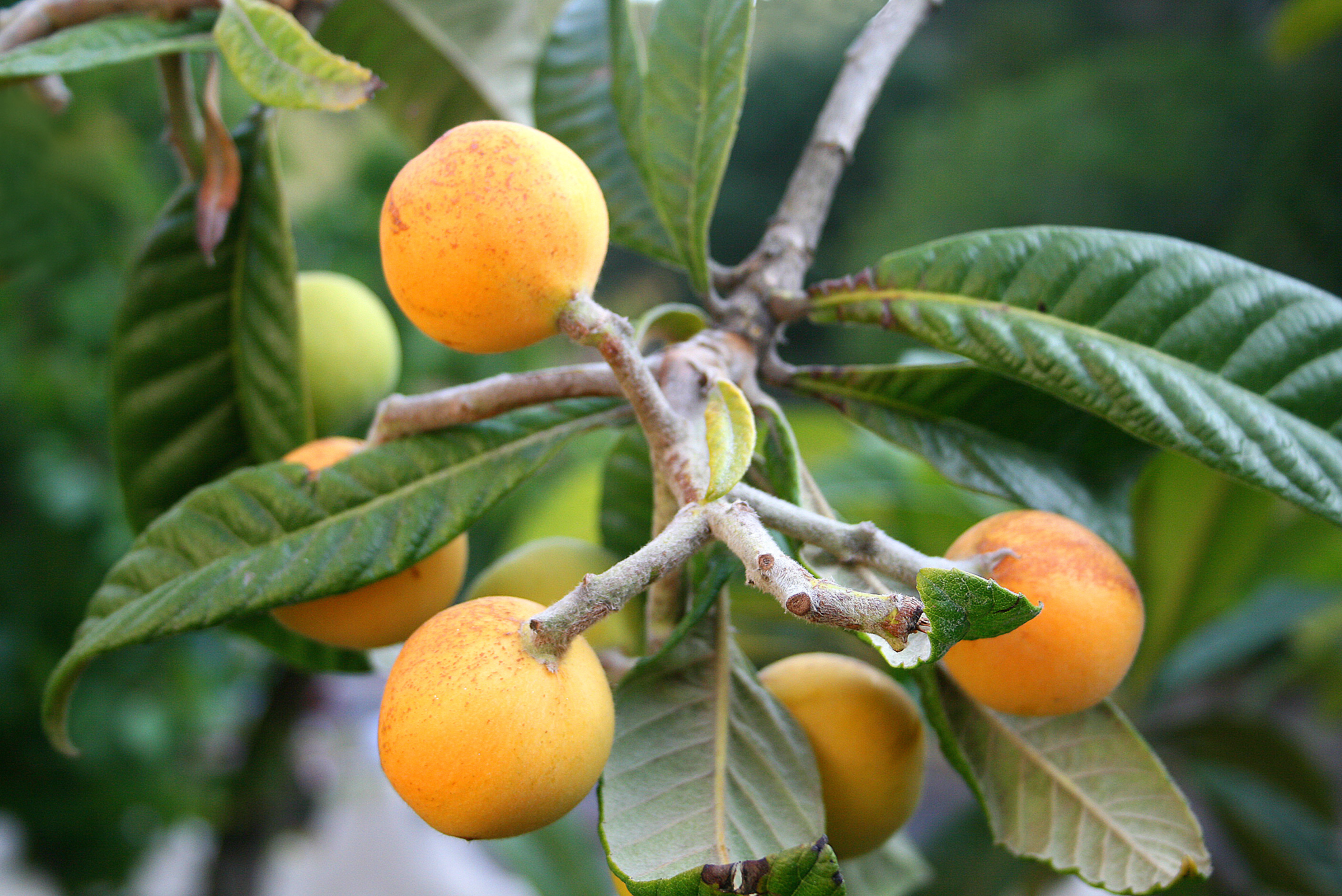
A loquat, genus Eriobotrya

- Eriobotrya Lindl.
- Eriolobus (Ser.) M.Roem. – synonym of Malus
- Exochorda Lindl.

== F ==
- Fallugia Endl.
- Farinopsis Chrtek & Soják
- Filipendula Mill.
- Fragaria L.

== G ==
- Geum L.
- Gillenia Moench
- Griffitharia Rushforth – synonym of Micromeles

== H ==
- Hagenia J.F.Gmel.
- Hedlundia Sennikov & Kurtto
- Hesperomeles Lindl.
- Heteromeles M.Roem.
- Holodiscus (K.Koch) Maxim.

== K ==
- Kageneckia Ruiz & Pav.
- Karpatiosorbus Sennikov & Kurtto – synonym of Aria
- Kelseya (S.Watson) Rydb.
- Kerria DC.

== L ==
- Leucosidea Eckl. & Zeyh.
- Lindleya Kunth
- Luetkea Bong.
- Lyonothamnus A.Gray

== M ==
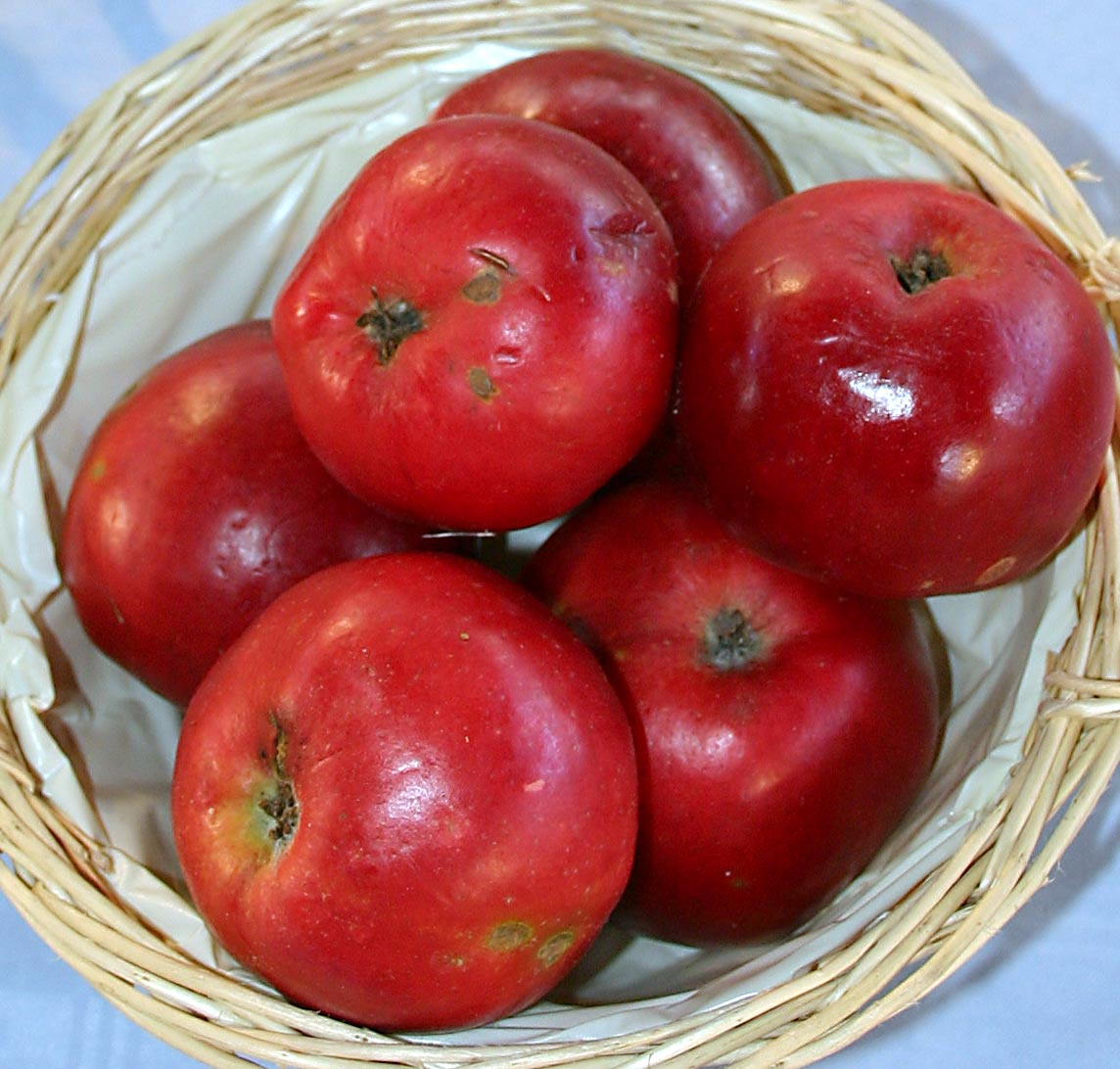
An apple, species Malus domestica.

- Macromeles Koidz.
- Majovskya Sennikov & Kurtto – synonym of Aria
- Malacomeles (Decne.) Decne.
- Malus Mill.
- Marcetella Svent.
- × Margyracaena Bitter
- Margyricarpus Ruiz & Pav.
- Mespilus L. – synonym of Crataegus
- Micromeles Decne.

== N ==
- Neillia D.Don
- Neviusia A.Gray
- Normeyera Sennikov & Kurtto – synonym of Hedlundia

== O ==
- Oemleria Rchb.
- Oncostylus (Schltdl.) F.Bolle
- Osteomeles Lindl.

== P ==
- Pentactina Nakai
- Peraphyllum Nutt.
- Petrophytum (Nutt.) Rydb.
- Phippsiomeles B.B.Liu & J.Wen
- Photinia Lindl.
- Physocarpus (Cambess.) Raf.
- Pleiosorbus L.H.Zhou & C.Y.Wu
- Polylepis Ruiz & Pav.
- Potaninia Maxim.
- Potentilla L.
- Pourthiaea Decne.
- Prinsepia Royle
- Prunus L.
- Pseudocydonia (C.K.Schneid.) C.K.Schneid.
- Purshia DC. ex Poir.
- Pyracantha M.Roem.
- × Pyraria A.Chev.
- Pyrus L.

== R ==
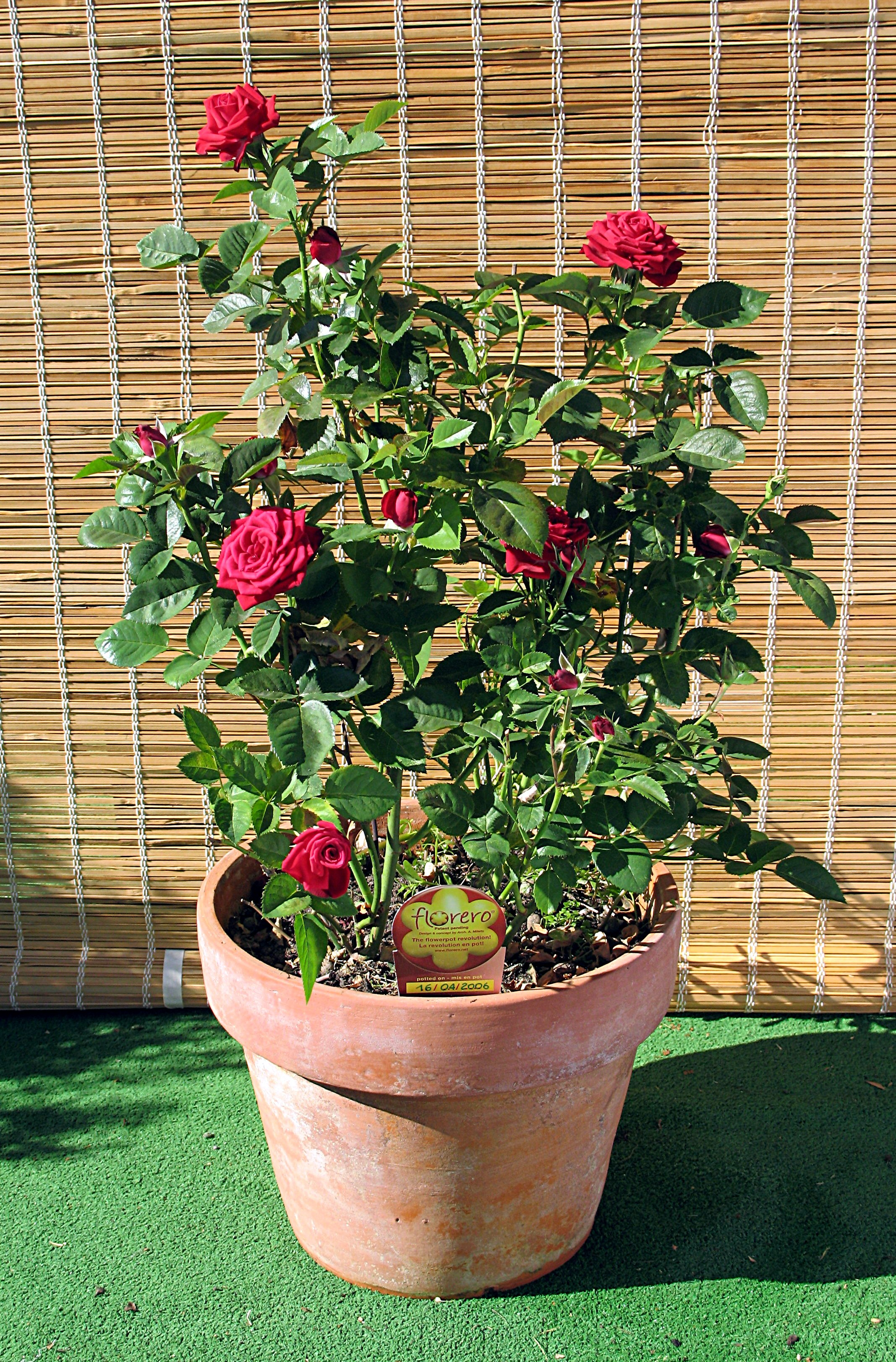
A hybrid rose genus Rosa.

- Rhaphiolepis Lindl.
- Rhodotypos Siebold & Zucc.
- Rosa L.
- Rubus L.

== S ==
- Sanguisorba L.
- Sarcopoterium Spach
- Scandosorbus Sennikov
- Sibbaldia L.
- Sibbaldianthe Juz.
- Sibbaldiopsis Rydb. – synonym of Sibbaldia
- Sibiraea Maxim.
- Sieversia Willd.
- Sorbaria (Ser. ex DC.) A.Braun
- × Sorbaronia C.K.Schneid.
- × Sorbocotoneaster Pojark.
- × Sorbomeles Sennikov & Kurtto
- × Sorbopyrus C.K.Schneid. (unplaced)
- Sorbus L.
- Spenceria Trimen
- Spiraea L.
- Spiraeanthus (Fisch. & C.A.Mey.) Maxim.
- Stranvaesia Lindl.

== T ==
- Taihangia T.T.Yu & C.L.Li
- Tetraglochin Poepp.
- Thomsonaria Rushforth – synonym of Micromeles
- Torminalis Medik. – synonym of Aria

== V ==
- Vauquelinia Corrêa ex Bonpl.

== W ==
- Waldsteinia Willd.
- Weniomeles B.B.Liu
- Wilsonaria Rushforth – synonym of Micromeles

== X ==
- Xerospiraea Hendrickson
