= Whitebeam =

Simple and lobe-leaved sorboid Malinae in the rose family Rosaceae

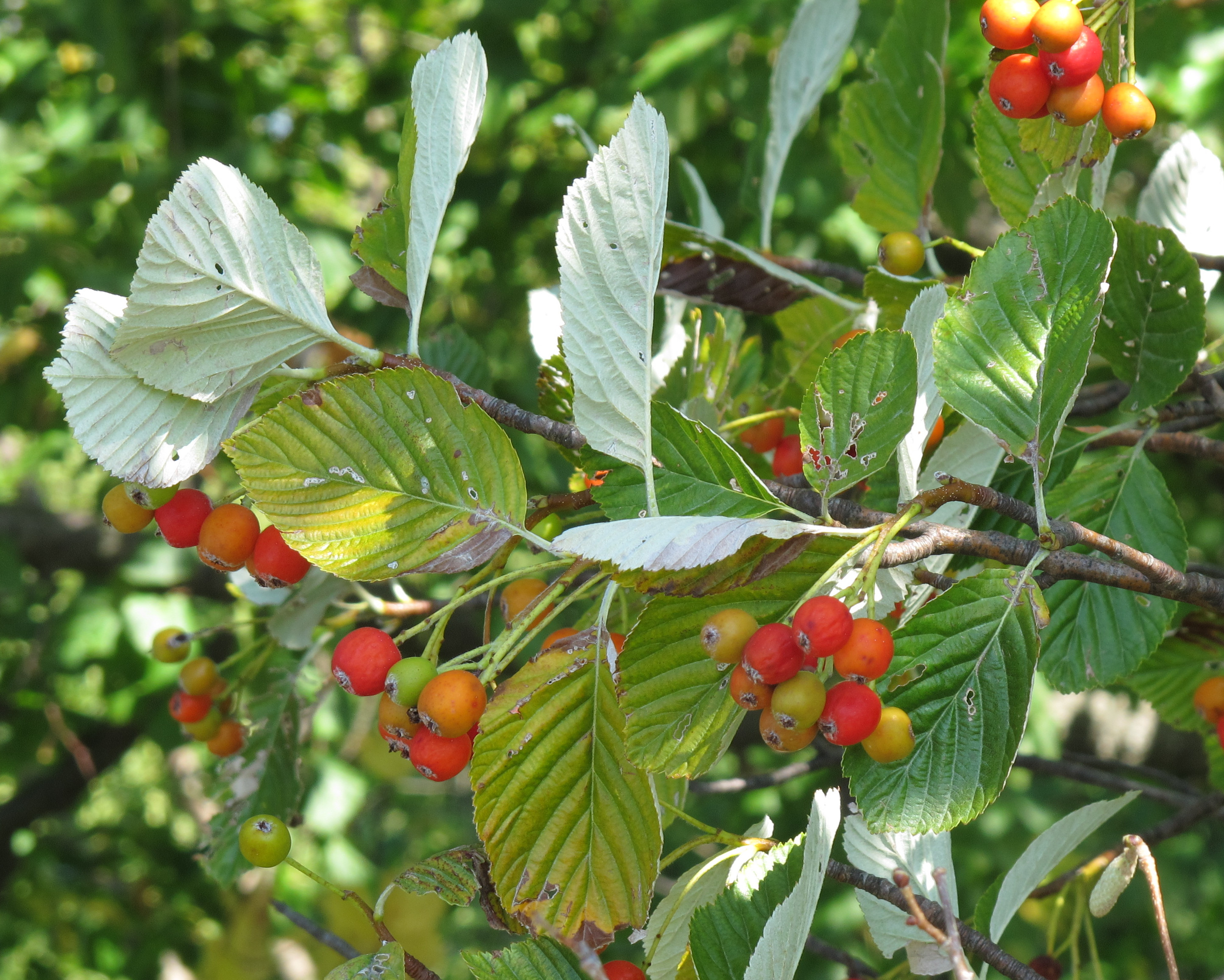
Common whitebeam with fruit

The whitebeams are members of the family Rosaceae, tribe Malinae, comprising a number of deciduous simple or lobe-leaved species formerly lumped together within Sorbus s.l. Many whitebeams are the result of extensive intergeneric hybridisation involving the genera Sorbus (Sorbus aucuparia in particular), Aria, Torminalis and Chamaemespilus. As an effect, they are commonly apomicts (reproducing solely asexually) and many have very restricted ranges. The best known species is the common whitebeam (Aria edulis), a columnar tree which grows to 25 m (82 ft) tall by 10 m (33 ft) broad, with clusters of white flowers in spring followed by speckled red berries in autumn (fall).

== Appearance ==
In many species, the surface of the leaves is an unremarkable mid-green, but the underside is pale to almost white (hence the name) with pale grey or white hairs, transforming the appearance of the tree in strong winds, as noted by the poet Meredith: "flashing as in gusts the sudden-lighted whitebeam". It is also described as the "wind-beat whitebeam" in Gerard Manley Hopkins' poem "The Starlight Night".

== Ecology ==
The berries are a favourite of fruit-eating birds like thrushes and waxwings, though are less palatable (drier, less juicy) than rowan berries. Whitebeams are sometimes used as larval food plants by species of Lepidoptera, including the short-cloaked moth.

== Uses ==
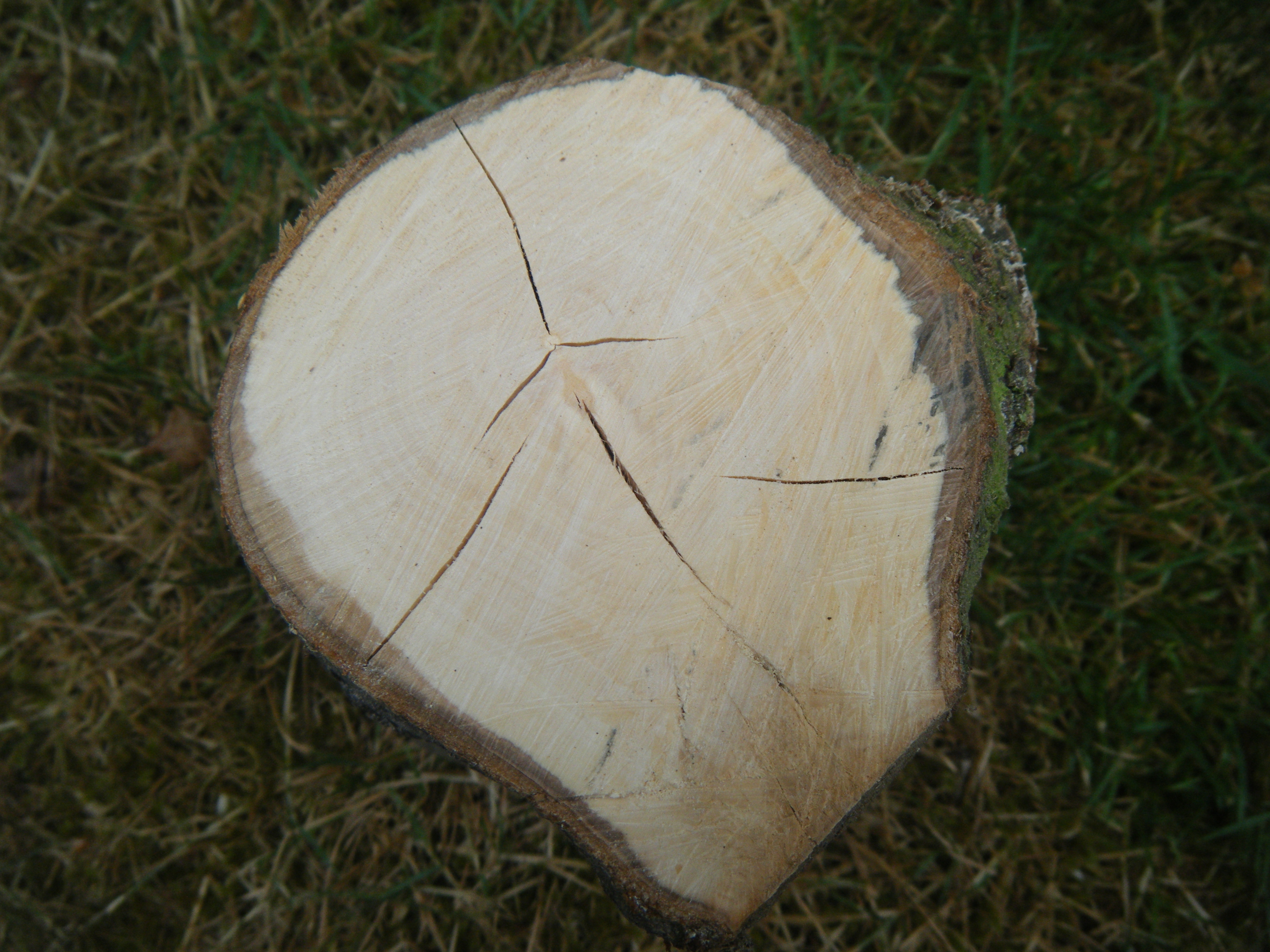
Cross-section of a whitebeam trunk

These trees are often grown in parks and large gardens. The cultivars A. edulis 'Lutescens' and A. edulis 'Majestica' have gained the Royal Horticultural Society's Award of Garden Merit.

The tough, hard wood is a deep orange when wet, and pale yellow after drying.

The fruit is edible, but only when nearly rotten.

== Taxonomy ==
Whitebeams are not a natural monophyletic taxonomic grouping; they are representatives of several genera of the Malinae subtribe, all of which were traditionally treated within a broadly circumscribed genus Sorbus s.l. This treatment of Sorbus was however was found to be polyphyletic, comprising two monophyletic clades that were not particularly closely related to each other. Now, Sorbus is more often defined in a narrow sense to include only the rowans or mountain-ashes, with all the other former members being elevated into genera in their own right. Species which are commonly referred to as whitebeams can be found in several genera, five of which are the result of intergeneric hybridisation.

=== Non-hybridogenous whitebeam genera ===
==== In western Eurasia ====
- Aria
- Chamaemespilus

==== In eastern Eurasia ====
- Alniaria
- Griffitharia
- Pleiosorbus
- Micromeles
- Dunnaria
- Thomsonaria
- Wilsonaria

=== Hybridogenous whitebeam genera ===
- Hedlundia - Aria × Sorbus hybrids
- Karpatiosorbus - Aria × Torminalis hybrids
- Majovskya - Aria × Chamaemespilus hybrids
- Scandosorbus (syn. Borkhausenia) - Aria × Sorbus × Torminalis hybrids
- Normeyera - Aria × Chamaemespilus × Sorbus hybrids
