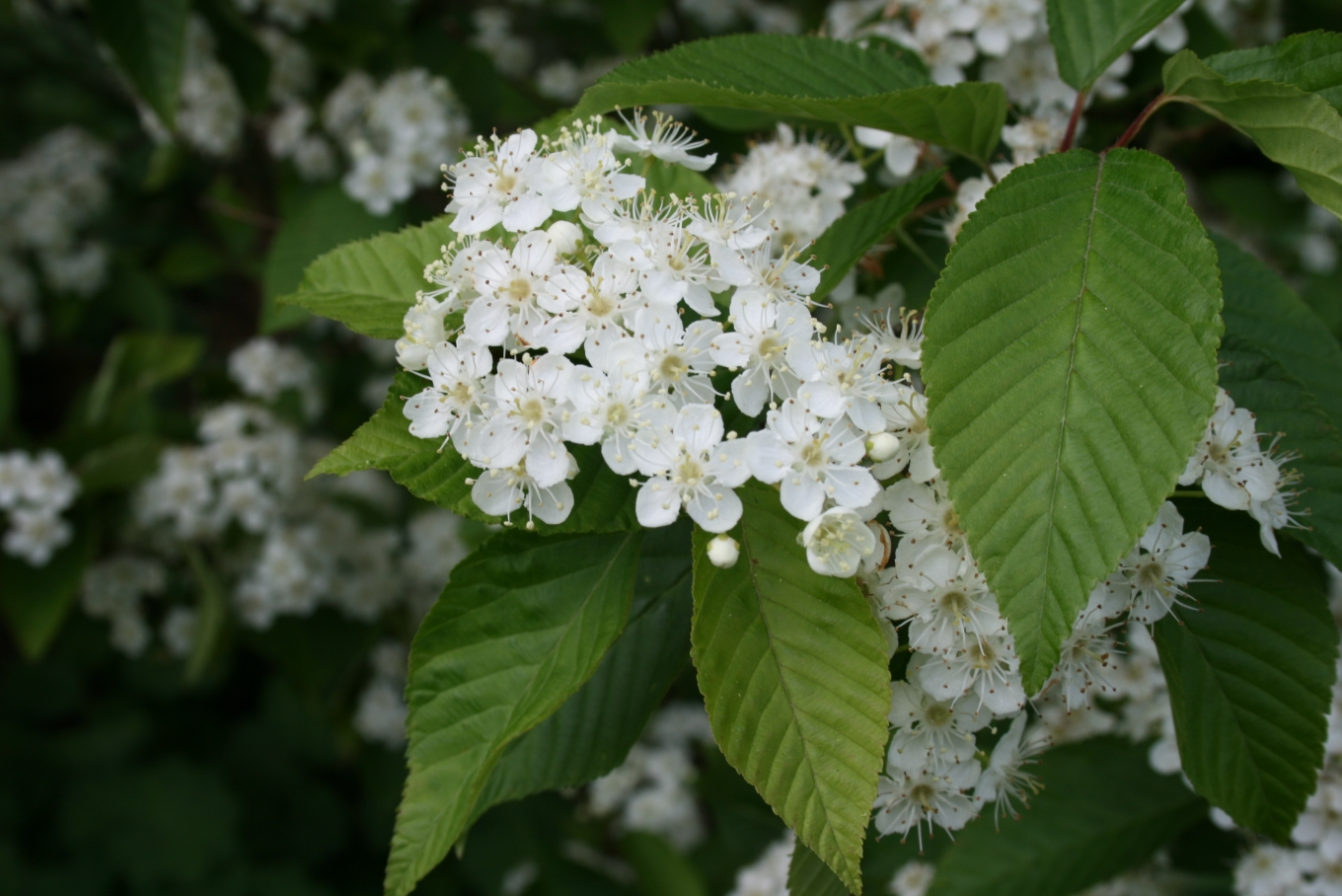
- Foliage and flowers

Conservation status
- Least Concern (IUCN 3.1)

Scientific classification
- Kingdom: Plantae
- Clade: Embryophytes
- Clade: Tracheophytes
- Clade: Angiosperms
- Clade: Eudicots
- Clade: Rosids
- Order: Rosales
- Family: Rosaceae
- Genus: Alniaria
- Species: A. alnifolia

Binomial name
- Alniaria alnifolia (Siebold & Zucc.) Rushforth

Synonyms
- Aria alnifolia (Siebold & Zucc.) Decne.; Aria tiliifolia Decne.; Crataegus alnifolia Siebold & Zucc.; Micromeles alnifolia (Siebold & Zucc.) Koehne; Pyrus alnifolia (Siebold & Zucc.) Franch. & Sav.; Pyrus miyabei Sarg.; Sorbus alnifolia (Siebold & Zucc.) K.Koch; Sorbus alnifolia f. oblongifolia (Nakai) W.Lee

= Alniaria alnifolia =

Species of flowering plant in the rose family

Alniaria alnifolia (syn. Micromeles alnifolia, Sorbus alnifolia and Aria alnifolia), also called alder-leafed whitebeam or Korean whitebeam, is a species of whitebeam native to eastern Asia in eastern and northern China, Taiwan, Korea and Japan. Long treated in a wide interpretation of Sorbus, it was first moved to Alniaria in 2018, and more recently with the other species in this genus merged into Micromeles in 2023; this latest revision has now been accepted by the Plants of the World Online database.

== Description ==
Alniaria alnifolia is a medium-sized deciduous tree growing to 10–20 m (33–66 ft) tall with a trunk up to 30 cm (12 in) diameter and grey bark; the crown is columnar or conic in young trees, becoming rounded with age, with branches angled upwards, and slender shoots. The leaves are green above, and thinly hairy with white hairs beneath, 5–10 cm (2.0–3.9 in) long and 3–6 cm (1.2–2.4 in) broad, simple, usually unlobed (but see varieties, below), broadest near the base, with serrated margins and an acute apex. The autumn colour is orange-pink to red. The flowers are 10–18 mm diameter, with five white petals and 20 yellowish-white stamens; they are produced in corymbs 4–8 cm diameter in late spring. The fruit is a globose pome 8–15 mm diameter, bright red, with a dimple at the apex; they are mature in mid autumn.

== Cultivation and uses ==
It is occasionally grown as an ornamental tree in northern Europe, primarily for its autumn colour. The cultivar 'Skyline' has been selected for its fastigiate growth.

== Gallery ==
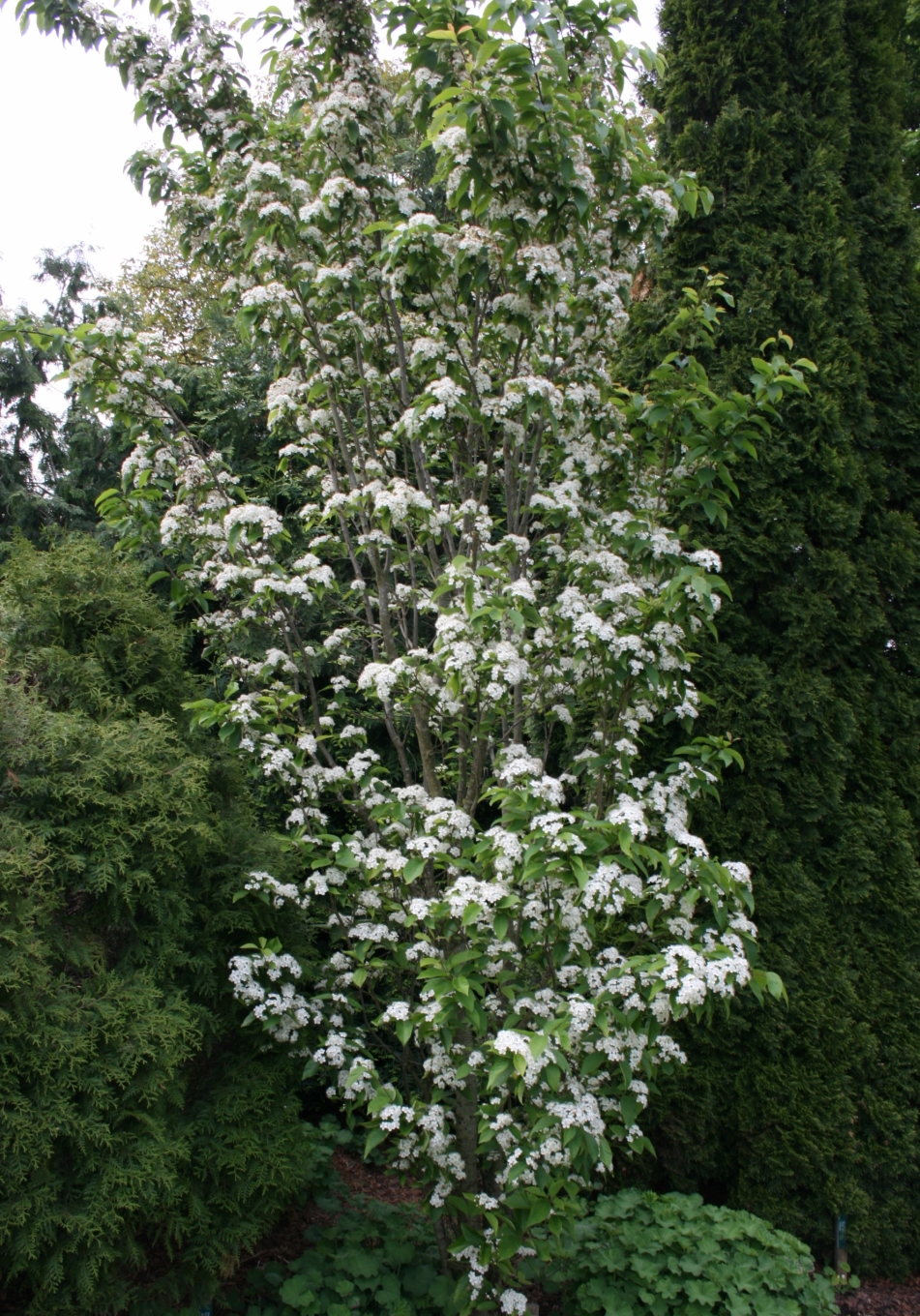
Specimen in cultivation, Denmark

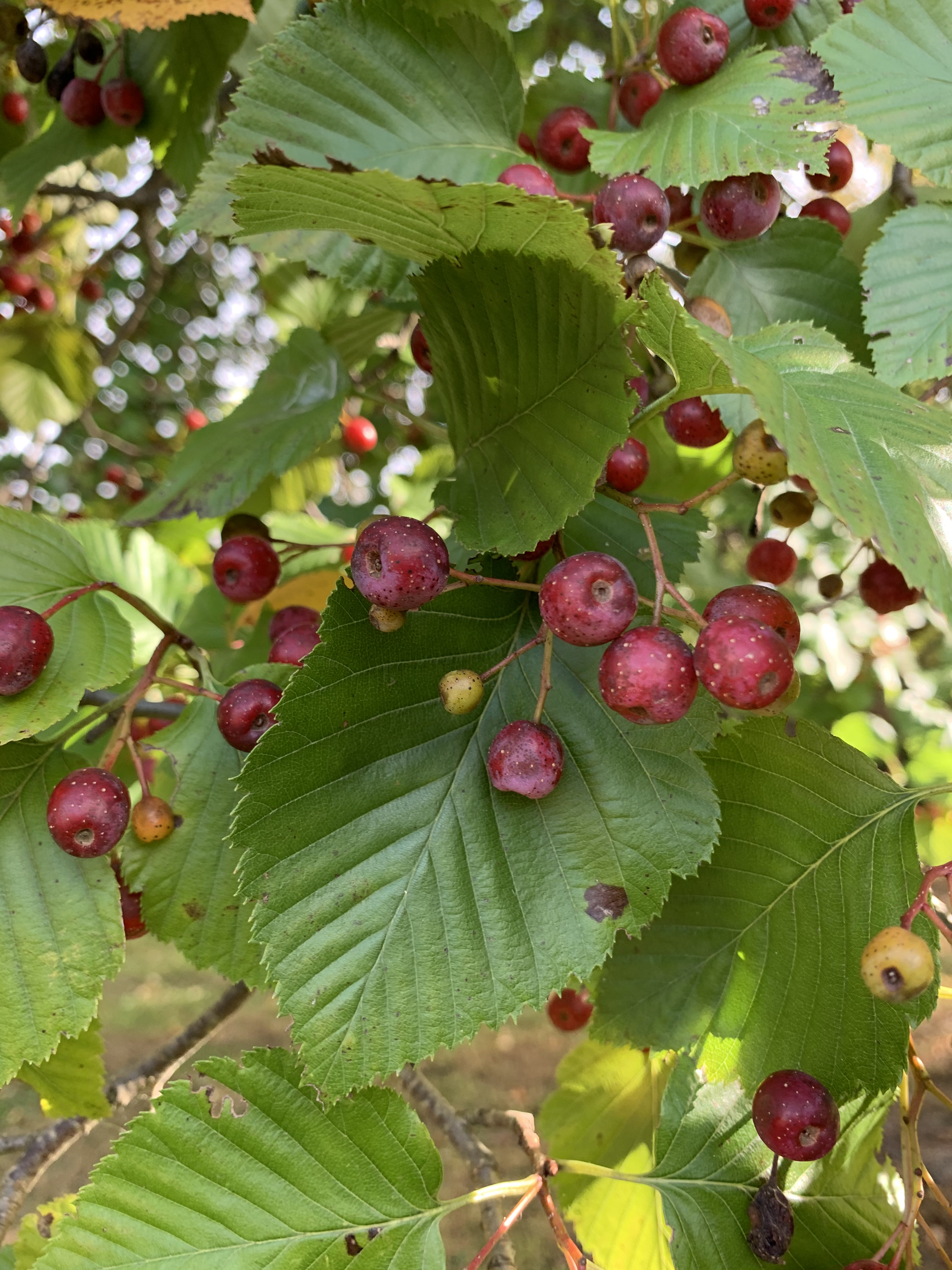
Red pomes in autumn, Morris Arboretum

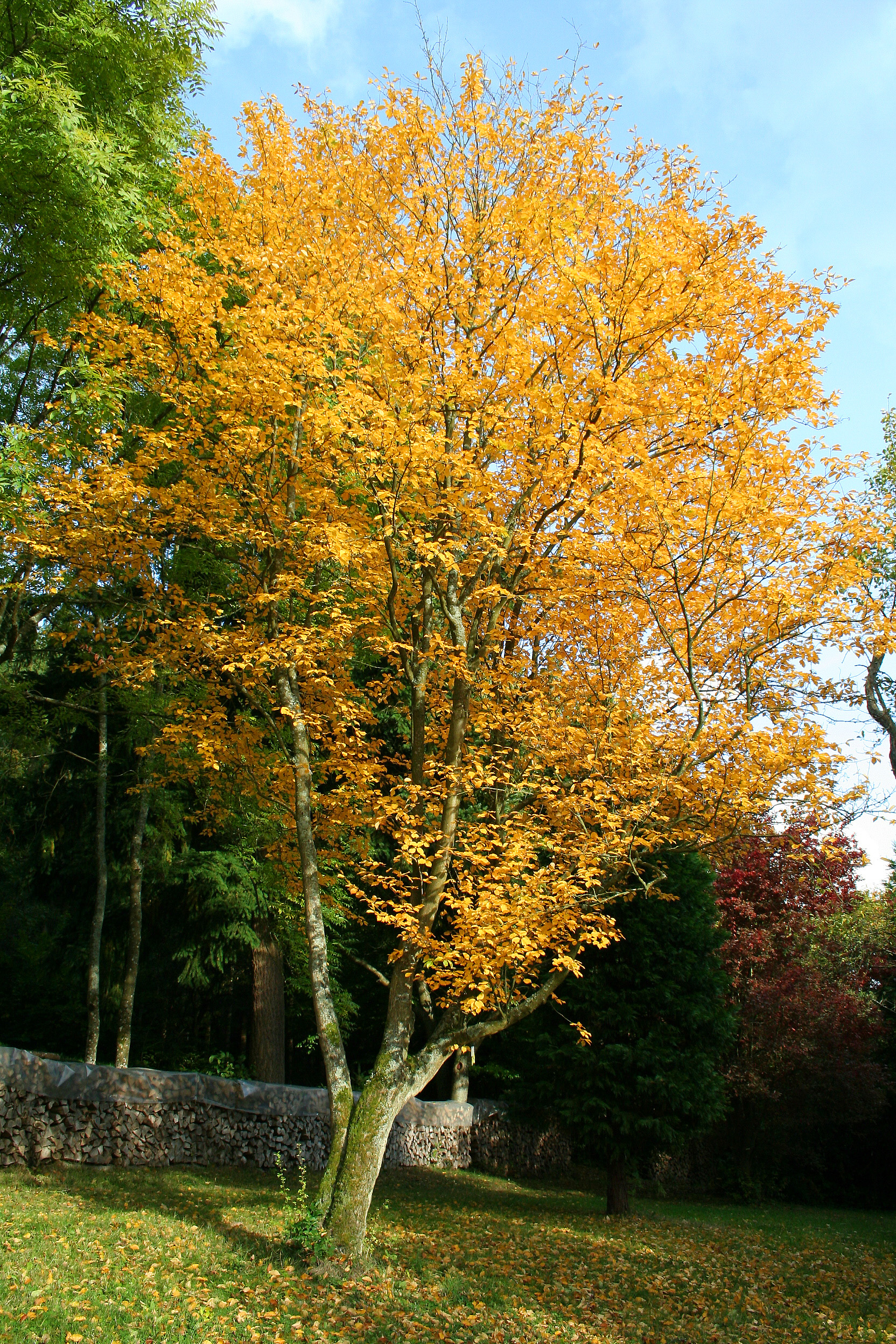
Alniaria alnifolia 'Submollis' in Arboretum Robert Lenoir - Rendeux (Belgium)

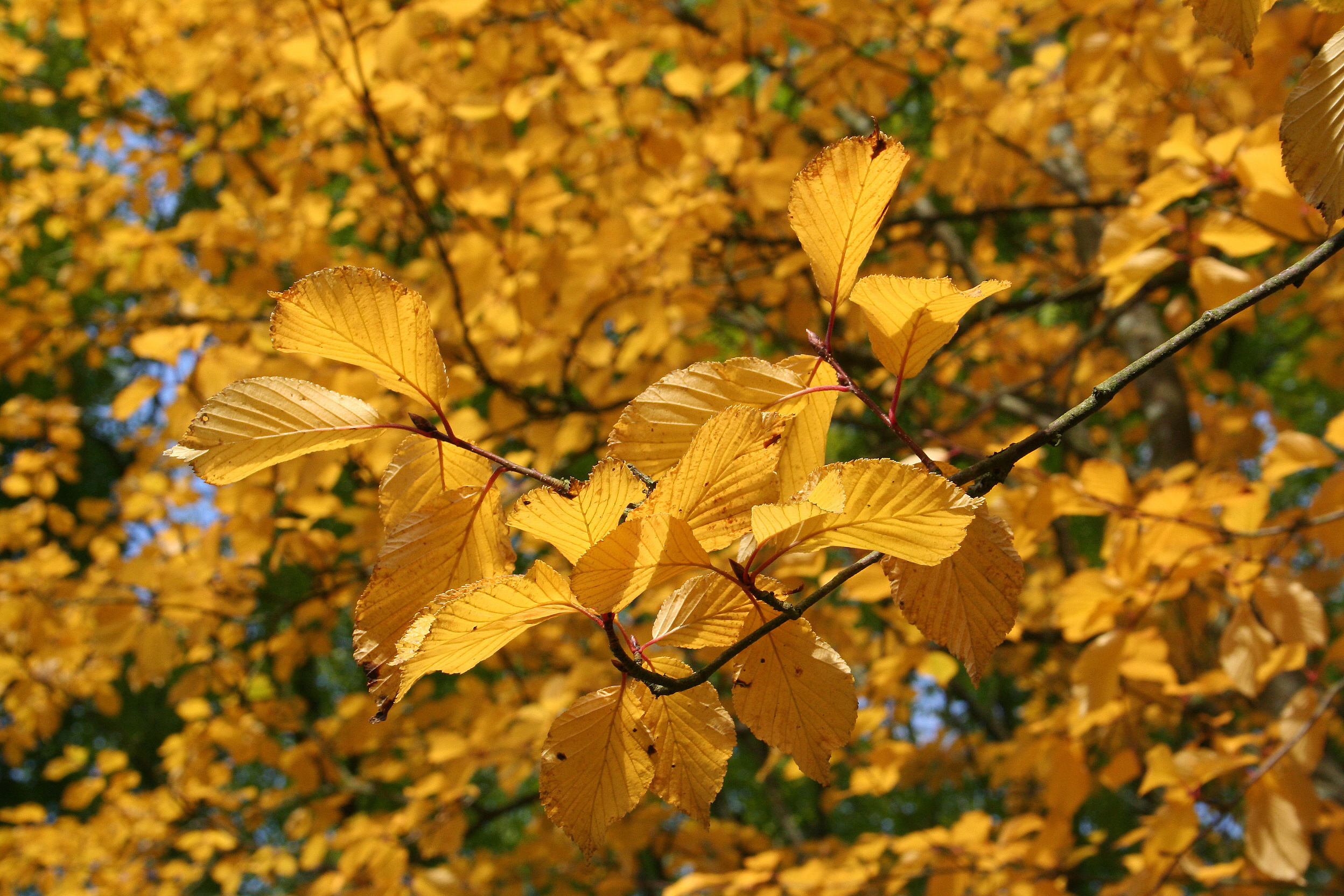
Alniaria alnifolia 'Submollis' leaves in autumn

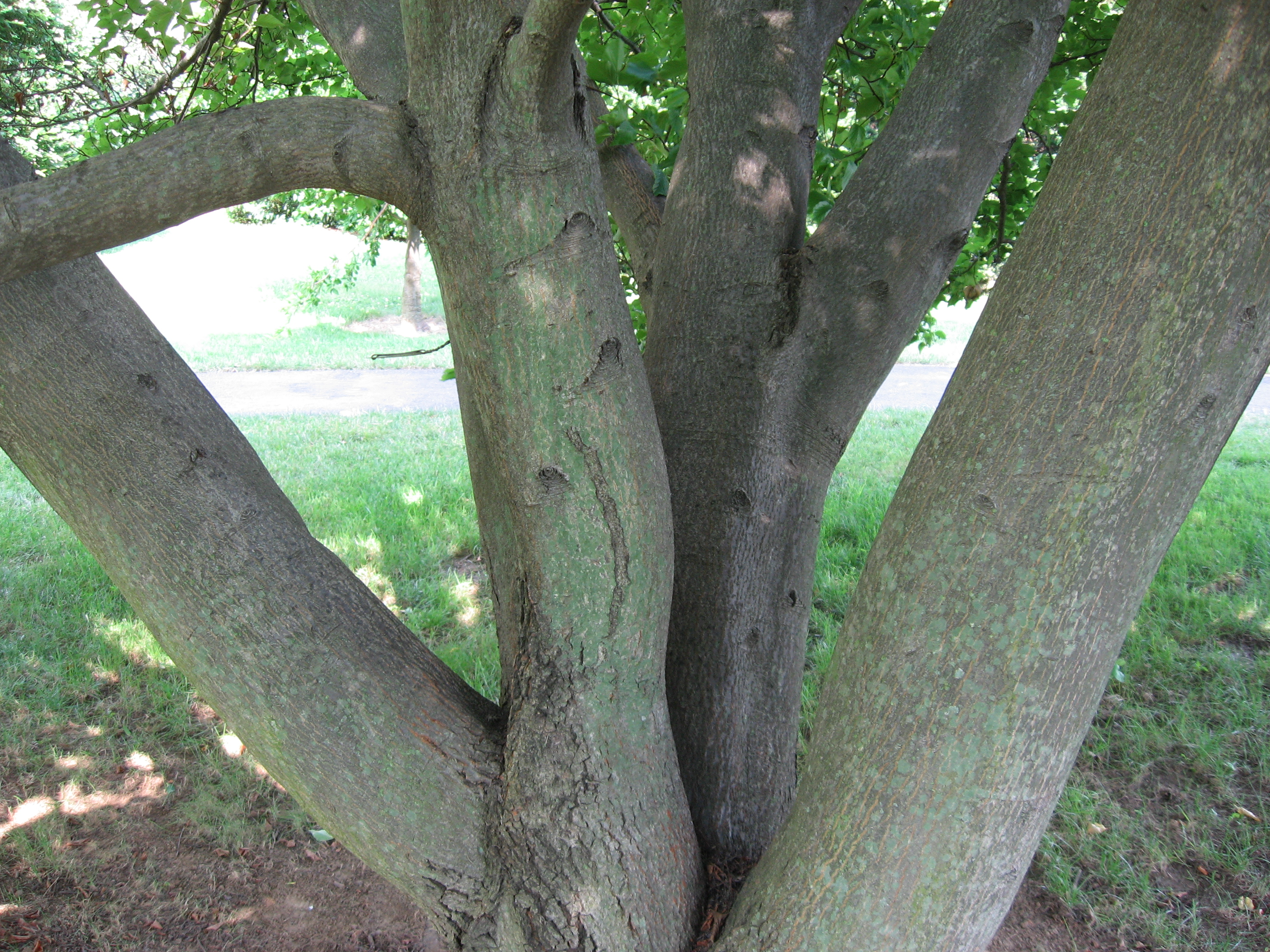
Closeup of trunk
