= Siev =

Siev or SIEV may refer to:

- Suspected Irregular Entry Vessel, operational term used by the Australian Defence Force and Australian Coastwatch
- Siev., taxonomic author abbreviation of Johann August Carl Sievers (1762–1795), German-born botanist
- W.Siev., taxonomic author abbreviation of Wilhelm Sievers (1860–1921), German geologist and geographer
- David Siev, director of the American documentary film, Bad Axe

== See also ==
- Sieve, a utensil
- SEIV, Space Empires IV, predecessor to Space Empires V
