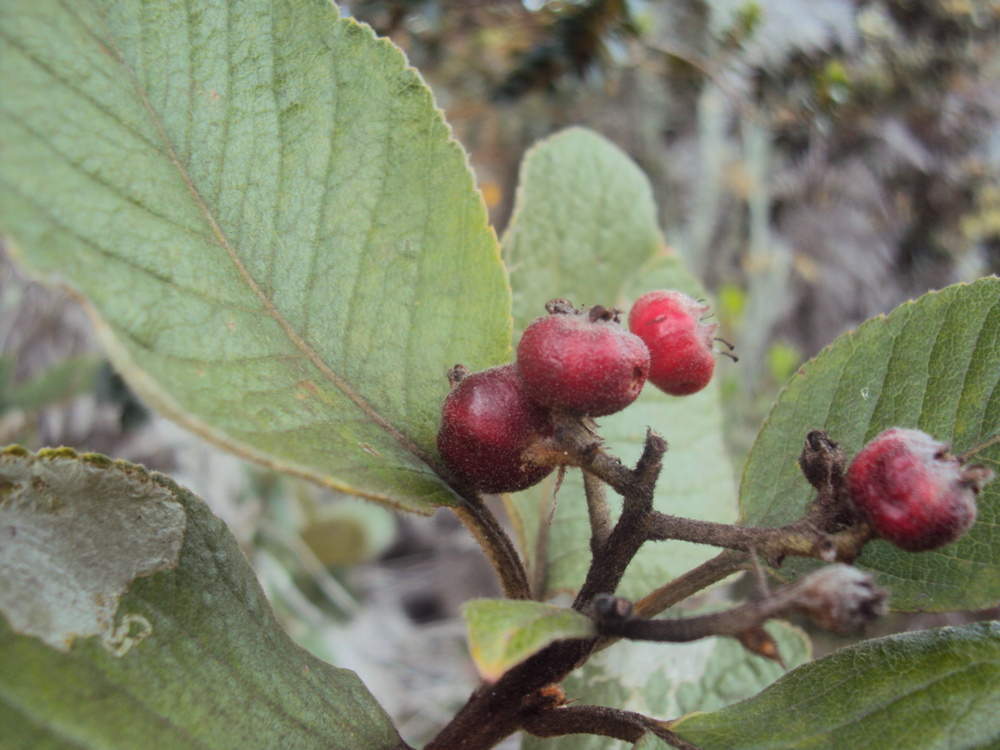
- Branchlet with leaves and fruits

Conservation status
- Least Concern (IUCN 3.1)

Scientific classification
- Kingdom: Plantae
- Clade: Tracheophytes
- Clade: Angiosperms
- Clade: Eudicots
- Clade: Rosids
- Order: Rosales
- Family: Rosaceae
- Genus: Hesperomeles
- Species: H. ferruginea

Binomial name
- Hesperomeles ferruginea (Pers.)Benth.

= Hesperomeles ferruginea =

Species of tree

Hesperomeles ferruginea is an evergreen shrub or tree in the family Rosaceae, native to montane forests on the Andes from Venezuela to Bolivia.

== Description ==
Shrub or tree up to 12 m high and 50 cm dbh; with gray bark; branchlets rusty colored. Leaves are ovate or elliptic, with serrate margins, 5 – 7 cm long, covered with rusty colored hairs on the underside. The white flowers are arranged in a cymose inflorescence up to 10 cm long; the petals are white and pilose, ca. 1 cm long; the bittersweet red fruits resemble little apples, up to 2 cm wide.

== Distribution and habitat ==
Hesperomeles ferruginea is found in the Andes, from Venezuela to Bolivia, between 1900 and 4000 m of elevation. It is found in montane forests and paramo grasslands.

== Uses ==
Hesperomeles ferruginea yields good quality wood, suitable for indoors carpentry. It has white color, straight grain and medium texture.
