= Micromeles hemsleyi =

Conservation status
- Least Concern (IUCN 3.1)

Scientific classification
- Kingdom: Plantae
- Clade: Tracheophytes
- Clade: Angiosperms
- Clade: Eudicots
- Clade: Rosids
- Order: Rosales
- Family: Rosaceae
- Genus: Micromeles
- Species: M. hemsleyi

Binomial name
- Micromeles hemsleyi C.K.Schneid.

Synonyms
- List: Aria hemsleyi (C.K.Schneid.) H.Ohashi & Iketani; Griffitharia hemsleyi (C.K.Schneid.) Rushforth; Pyrus hemsleyi (C.K.Schneid.) Cardot; Sorbus hemsleyi (C.K.Schneid.) Rehder; Aria xanthoneura (Rehder) H.Ohashi & Iketani; Pyrus xanthoneura (Rehder) Cardot; Sorbus xanthoneura Rehder

Species of flowering plant

Micromeles hemsleyi is a species of tree in the family Rosaceae native to central China.

== Description ==
Micromeles hemsleyi is a small, erect deciduous tree to 4 m (13 ft) in height, with grey-green leaves and white flowers followed by brown fruit. The fruit are a major component of the diet of the yellow-throated marten (Martes flavigula).

== Uses ==
The cultivar 'John Bond' has gained the Royal Horticultural Society's Award of Garden Merit as an ornamental.
