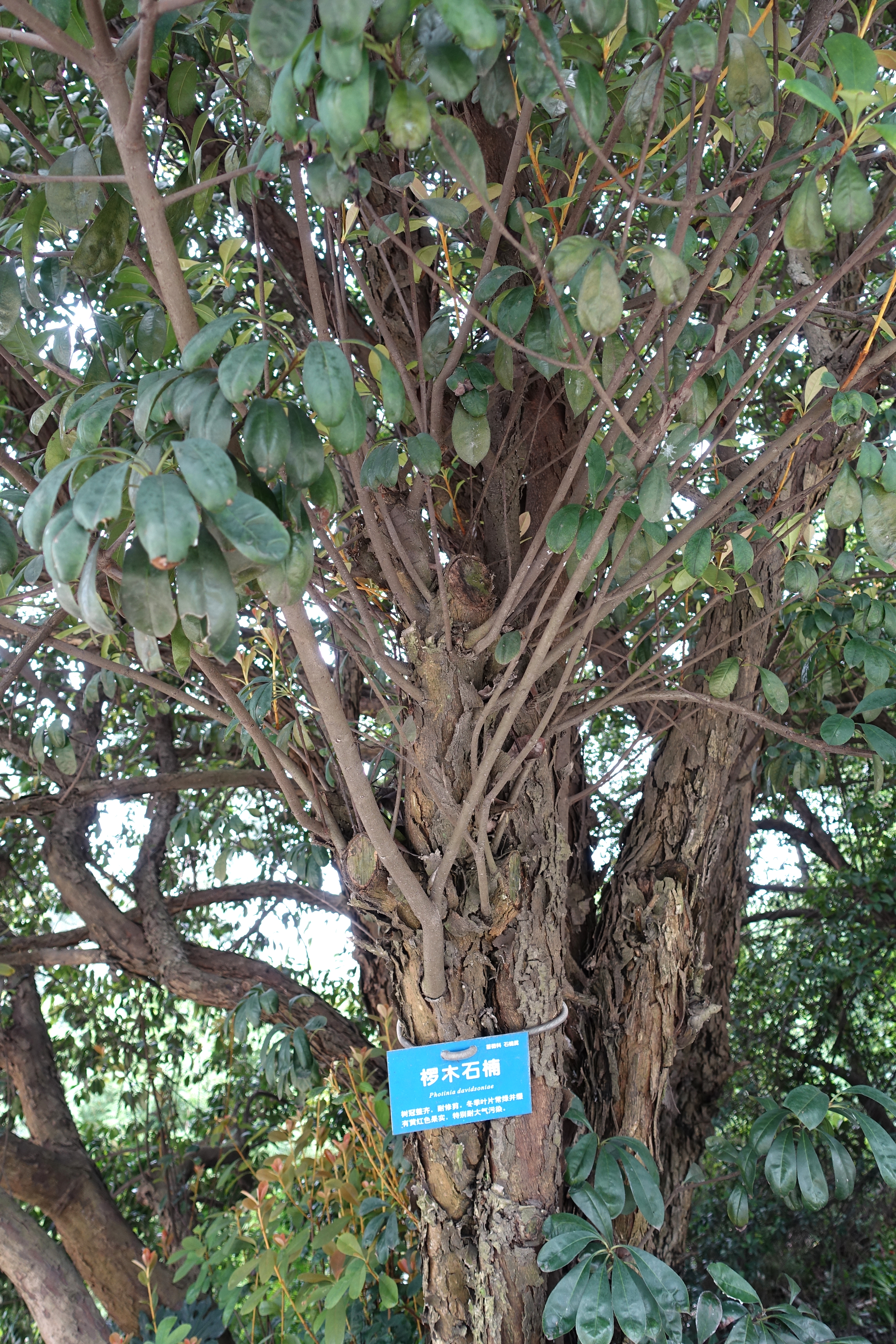

Scientific classification
- Kingdom: Plantae
- Clade: Tracheophytes
- Clade: Angiosperms
- Clade: Eudicots
- Clade: Rosids
- Order: Rosales
- Family: Rosaceae
- Genus: Weniomeles
- Species: W. bodinieri

Binomial name
- Weniomeles bodinieri (H.Lév.) B.B.Liu

Synonyms
- Synonymy: Hiptage esquirolii H.Lév.; Photinia bodinieri H.Lév. (1907); Photinia davidsoniae Rehder & E.H.Wilson; Photinia bodinieri var. longifolia Cardot; Photinia davidsoniae Rehder & E.H.Wilson; Photinia davidsoniae var. ambigua Cardot; Photinia davidsoniae var. pungens Cardot; Photinia lindleyana var. yunnanensis Cardot; Photinia serrulata H.Lév.; Pyrus davidsoniae (Rehder & E.H.Wilson) M.F.Fay & Christenh.; Pyrus eureka M.F.Fay & Christenh.; Stranvaesia bodinieri (H.Lév.) B.B.Liu & J.Wen; Stranvaesia bodinieri var. longifolia (Cardot) B.B.Liu & J.Wen; Weniomeles bodinieri var. ambigua (Cardot) B.B.Liu; Weniomeles bodinieri var. longifolia (Cardot) B.B.Liu; Weniomeles bodinieri var. pungens (Cardot) B.B.Liu

= Weniomeles bodinieri =

Species of flowering plant

Weniomeles bodinieri (synonym Photinia bodinieri) is an evergreen tree belonging to the family Rosaceae. It is native to central and southern China and northern Vietnam. It typically grows to a height of 6 to 15 meters.

The species was first described as Photinia bodinieri by Augustin Abel Hector Léveillé in 1907. In 2023 Bin Bin Liu placed the species in the newly-described genus Weniomeles as Weniomeles bodinieri.

== Description ==
- Leaves: The leaf blades are oblong, elliptic, or obovate to oblanceolate, measuring 5–10(–15) cm in length and 2–5 cm in width, with sharply serrated margins.
- Flowers: The species produces flowers in May.
- Fruit: The seeds ripen from September to October.

== Habitat and cultivation ==
Photinia bodinieri thrives in forest margins, thickets, valleys, and rocky slopes. It is adaptable to various soil types, including light (sandy), medium (loamy), and heavy (clay) soils, and prefers well-drained, moist conditions.

== See also ==
- Tropical Trees website
