= Micromeles thibetica =

Scientific classification
- Kingdom: Plantae
- Clade: Embryophytes
- Clade: Tracheophytes
- Clade: Angiosperms
- Clade: Eudicots
- Clade: Rosids
- Order: Rosales
- Family: Rosaceae
- Genus: Micromeles
- Species: M. thibetica

Binomial name
- Micromeles thibetica (Cardot) Mezhenskyj

Synonyms
- Aria thibetica (Cardot) H.Ohashi & Iketani; Griffitharia thibetica (Cardot) Rushforth; Pyrus thibetica Cardot (1918); Sorbus thibetica (Cardot) Hand.-Mazz.

Species of tree

Micromeles thibetica (康藏花楸), the Tibetan whitebeam, is a species of flowering plant in the family Rosaceae, native to Yunnan in south-central China and possibly elsewhere in the Himalayas. Growing to 20 m (66 ft) tall by 15 m (49 ft) broad, it is a substantial deciduous tree. Like other whitebeams, the undersides of the leaves are white, giving a dramatic effect when the wind blows through them.

The more compact cultivar 'John Mitchell' has gained the Royal Horticultural Society's Award of Garden Merit.
