= Micromeles lanata =

Scientific classification
- Kingdom: Plantae
- Clade: Embryophytes
- Clade: Tracheophytes
- Clade: Spermatophytes
- Clade: Angiosperms
- Clade: Eudicots
- Clade: Rosids
- Order: Rosales
- Family: Rosaceae
- Genus: Micromeles
- Species: M. lanata

Binomial name
- Micromeles lanata (D.Don) Mezhenskyj

Synonyms
- List: Aria kamaonensis M.Roem.; Aria lanata (D.Don) Decne.; Cormus lanata (D.Don) Koehne; Micromeles lanata (D.Don) Mezhenskyj; Pyrus kamaonensis Wall. ex G.Don; Pyrus lanata D.Don; Sorbus kamunensis S.Schauer; Sorbus lanata (D.Don) S.Schauer; Aria kumaonensis (Strachey & Winterb.) Decne.; Pyrus kumaonensis Strachey & Winterb.

Species of tree

Micromeles lanata is a species of tree in the family Rosaceae native to Afghanistan, Nepal, Pakistan, and Western Himalaya.

== Description ==
=== Vegetative characteristics ===
It measures 10–12 metres (33–39 ft) tall, rarely a shrub. G. lanata is a fruit bearing tree that flowers in May. It can grow in loamy, sandy and clay soils. G. lanata can grow in complete sunlight or semi-shaded areas. It can withstand high wind speeds, but few other harsh conditions. It is sometimes grown as an ornamental plant in stone gardens, parks and yards.

=== Generative characteristics ===
The fruit of G. lanata grows in bunches with fruit of 1-3 cm in diameter. The seeds of this fruit contain trace amounts of hydrogen cyanide. This is not harmful as there is only a very small amount present in the seeds. There are no known medicinal properties of G. lanata and its fruit.

== Distribution and habitat ==
G. lanata is found in cooler areas of the northern hemisphere. It is native to eastern China and the Himalayas, but are also found in high grazing pastures of the British Isles.
