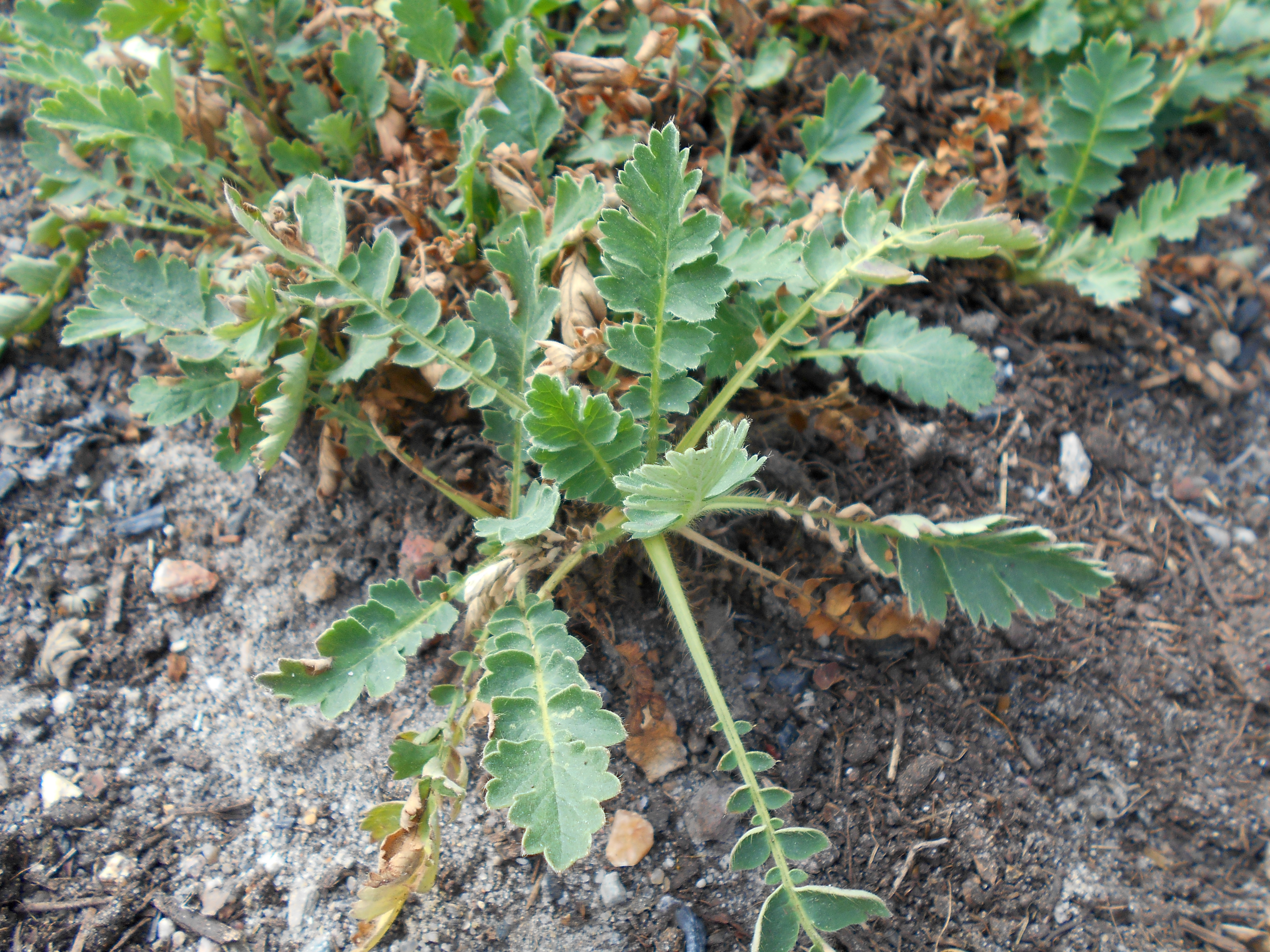
- Coluria Geoides

Scientific classification
- Kingdom: Plantae
- Clade: Tracheophytes
- Clade: Angiosperms
- Clade: Eudicots
- Clade: Rosids
- Order: Rosales
- Family: Rosaceae
- Subfamily: Rosoideae
- Tribe: Colurieae
- Genus: Coluria; R.Br.

Species
- See text

= Coluria =

Genus of flowering plants

Coluria is a plant genus in the sub family Rosoideae native to Asia, Siberia and Altai.

This herbaceous perennial plant reaches 30 cm in height and 30 cm in width. The flowers are hermaphroditic and are pollinated by insects. It grows on the banks of mountains rivers.

== Species ==
- Coluria elegans Cardot
- Coluria geoides (Pall.) Ledeb.
- Coluria henryi Batalin
- Coluria laxmannii Asch. & Graebn.
- Coluria longifolia Maxim.
- Coluria mongolica
- Coluria oligocarpa (J.Krause) Bolle
- Coluria omeiensis T.C.Ku
- Coluria potentilloides R.Br.
- Coluria purdomii

== See also ==
- List of Rosaceae genera
