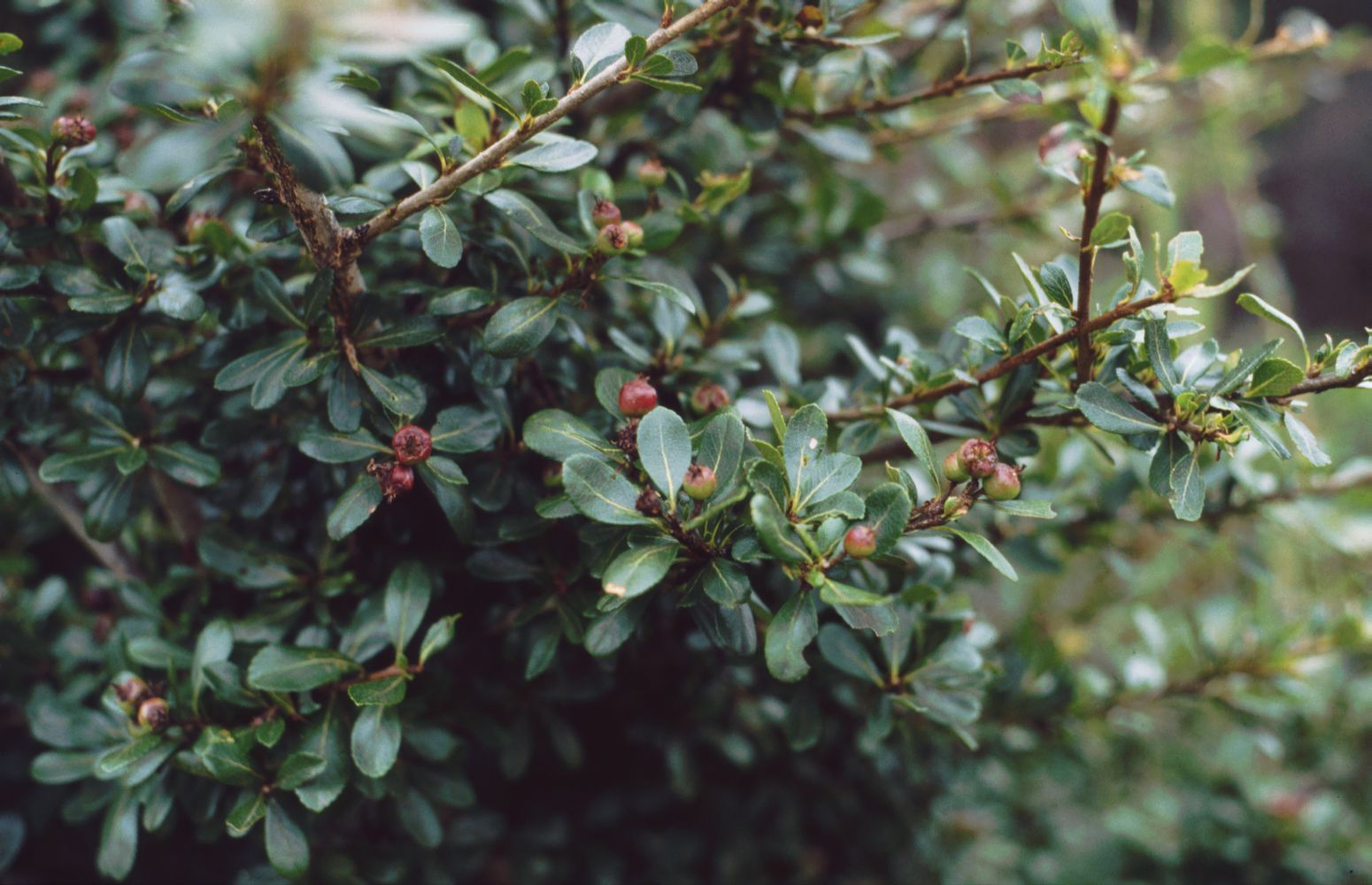

Conservation status
- Least Concern (IUCN 3.1)

Scientific classification
- Kingdom: Plantae
- Clade: Tracheophytes
- Clade: Angiosperms
- Clade: Eudicots
- Clade: Rosids
- Order: Rosales
- Family: Rosaceae
- Genus: Hesperomeles
- Species: H. obtusifolia

Binomial name
- Hesperomeles obtusifolia (Pers.) Lindl.

Synonyms
- Crataegus obtusifolia Pers.; Eriobotrya obtusifolia (Pers.) DC; Hesperomeles chiriquensis Woodson; Hesperomeles heterophylla Hook. nom. illeg.; Hesperomeles obovata (Pittier) Standl.; Osteomeles obovata Pittier.

= Hesperomeles obtusifolia =

Species of flowering plant

Hesperomeles obtusifolia is a species of plant native to South America. It is cultivated as an ornamental plant. The fruits of this species are edible, eaten freshly picked from the tree.
