= Coluria longifolia =

Scientific classification
- Kingdom: Plantae
- Clade: Embryophytes
- Clade: Tracheophytes
- Clade: Spermatophytes
- Clade: Angiosperms
- Clade: Eudicots
- Clade: Rosids
- Order: Rosales
- Family: Rosaceae
- Genus: Coluria
- Species: C. longifolia

Binomial name
- Coluria longifolia Maximowicz, 1882

Synonyms
- Coluria elegans Cardot; Coluria elegans var. imbricata Cardot; Coluria longifolia f. uniflora T. C. Ku; Coluria purdomii (N. E. Brown) W. E. Evans; Geum elatum Wallich ex G. Don var. humile Franchet (1890), not (Royle) J. D. Hooker (1878); Potentilla purdomii N. E. Brown.

Species of flowering plant

Coluria longifolia is a plant species in the genus Coluria found in alpine meadows (2700–4600 m) in Gansu, Qinghai, Sichuan, Xizang and Yunnan, China.
