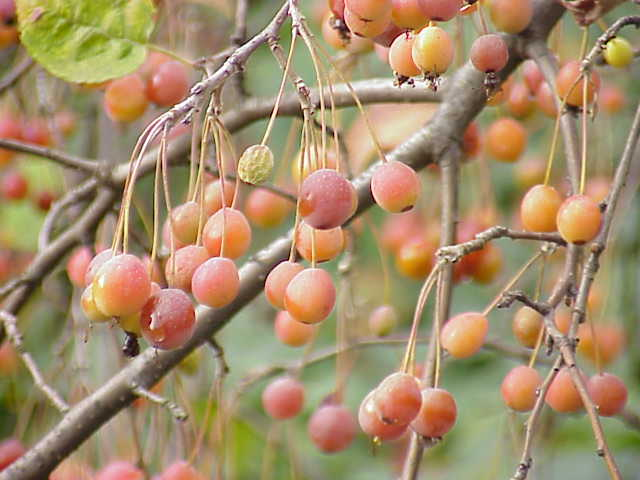
- Malus sikkimensis fruit

Scientific classification
- Kingdom: Plantae
- Clade: Tracheophytes
- Clade: Angiosperms
- Clade: Eudicots
- Clade: Rosids
- Order: Rosales
- Family: Rosaceae
- Subfamily: Amygdaloideae
- Tribe: Maleae
- Subtribe: Malinae; Reveal

Genera
- See text

Synonyms
- Pyrinae Baill.

= Malinae =

Malinae Temporal range: Eocene - recent

Subtribe of flowering plants

Malinae is the name for the apple subtribe in the rose family, Rosaceae. This name is required by the International Code of Nomenclature for algae, fungi, and plants, which came into force in 2011 (article 19) for any group at the subtribe rank that includes the genus Malus but not either of the genera Rosa or Amygdalus. The group includes a number of plants bearing commercially important fruits, such as apples and pears, while others are cultivated as ornamentals.

The tribe consists exclusively of shrubs and small trees characterised by a pome, a type of accessory fruit that does not occur in other Rosaceae, and by a basal haploid chromosome count of 17 (instead of 7, 8, 9, or 15 as in the other Rosaceae). There are approximately 28 genera with approximately 1100 species worldwide, with most species occurring in the temperate Northern Hemisphere.

== Taxonomy ==
The Malinae as currently circumscribed include the following genera:

- Alniaria
- Amelanchier - serviceberry, juneberry
- Aria - whitebeam
- Aronia - chokeberry
- Chaenomeles - Japanese quince
- Chamaemeles
- Chamaemespilus - false medlar
- Cormus - service tree
- Cotoneaster - cotoneaster
- Crataegus - hawthorn
- Cydonia - quince
- Dichotomanthes
- Dunnaria
- Eriobotrya - loquat
- Eriolobus - Lebanese wild apple, often included in Malus
- Griffitharia
- Hedlundia - Aria × Sorbus hybrids
- Hesperomeles
- Heteromeles - toyon
- Karpatiosorbus - Aria × Torminalis hybrids
- Macromeles
- Majovskya - Aria × Chamaemespilus hybrids
- Malacomeles
- Malus - apple, crabapple
- Mespilus - medlar
- Normeyera - Aria × Chamaemespilus × Sorbus hybrids
- Osteomeles
- Peraphyllum
- Photinia
- Pleiosorbus
- Pseudocydonia - Chinese quince
- Pyracantha - firethorn
- Pyrus - pear
- Rhaphiolepis - hawthorn
- Sorbus - rowan
- Scandosorbus - syn. Borkhausenia; Aria × Sorbus × Torminalis hybrids
- Stranvaesia
- Thomsonaria
- Torminalis - chequer tree
- Wilsonaria

Intergeneric hybrids:

- × Amelasorbus
- × Crataegosorbus
- × Crataemespilus
- × Malosorbus
- × Sorbaronia
- × Sorbocotoneaster
- × Sorbopyrus

and graft chimeras:

- + Crataegomespilus
- + Pyrocydonia (Pirocydonia)
