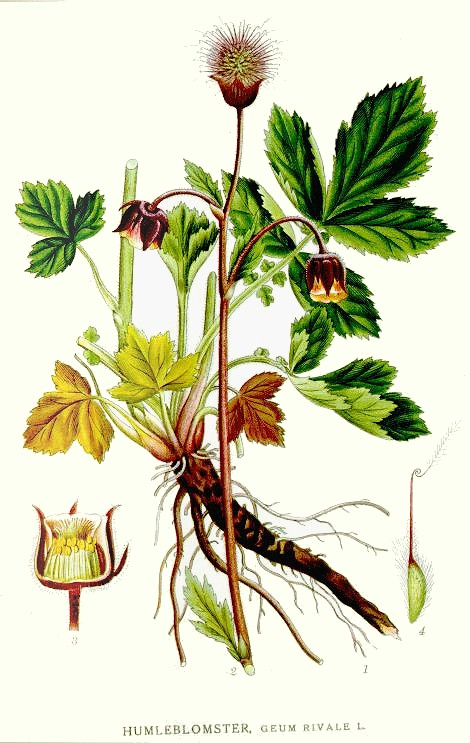
- Geum rivale

Scientific classification
- Kingdom: Plantae
- Clade: Tracheophytes
- Clade: Angiosperms
- Clade: Eudicots
- Clade: Rosids
- Order: Rosales
- Family: Rosaceae
- Subfamily: Rosoideae
- Tribe: Colurieae

Type genus
- Coluria

= Colurieae =

Tribe of flowering plants

Colurieae is a tribe of the rose family, Rosaceae.

== Genera ==
- Coluria R.Br.
- Fallugia Endl.
- Geum L.
- Oncostylus (Schltdl.) F.Bolle
- Sieversia Willd.
- Taihangia T.T.Yu & C.L.Li
- Waldsteinia Willd.
