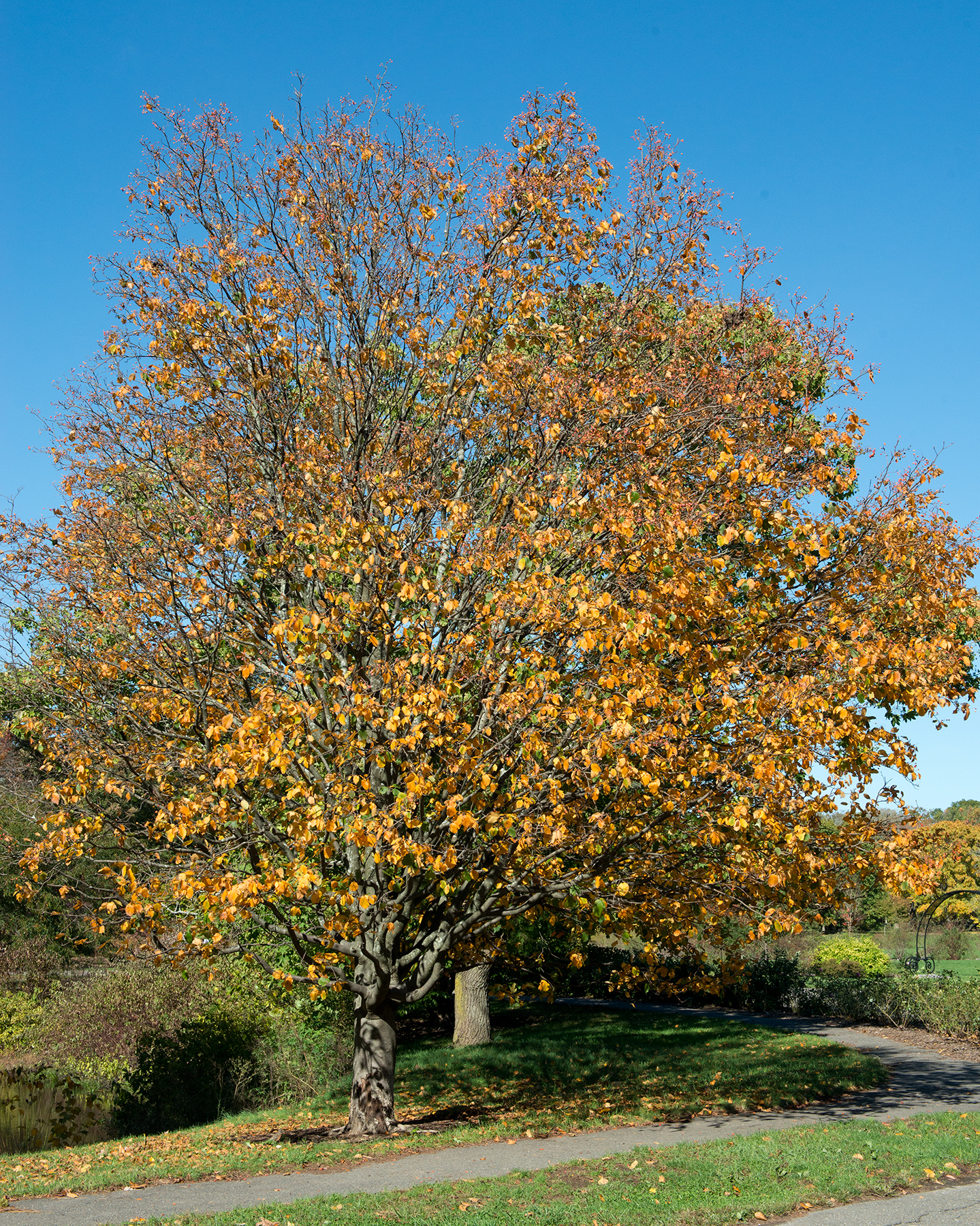
- At the Arnold Arboretum

Scientific classification
- Kingdom: Plantae
- Clade: Embryophytes
- Clade: Tracheophytes
- Clade: Spermatophytes
- Clade: Angiosperms
- Clade: Eudicots
- Clade: Rosids
- Order: Rosales
- Family: Rosaceae
- Genus: Alniaria
- Species: A. yuana

Binomial name
- Alniaria yuana (Spongberg) Rushforth

Synonyms
- Aria yuana (Spongberg) H.Ohashi & Iketani; Micromeles yuana (Spongberg) Mezhenskyj; Pyrus yuana (Spongberg) M.F.Fay & Christenh.; Sorbus yuana Spongberg

= Alniaria yuana =

Species of flowering plant

Alniaria yuana, (syns. Sorbus yuana, Aria yuana) Yu's whitebeam, is a species of flowering plant in the family Rosaceae, native to Chongqing, and western Hubei, China. Rare in the wild, it is usually found on steep ravine slopes over 2,000 m (6,600 ft) in elevation.

A shapely tree reaching 15 m (50 ft), with white flowers, red fruit, and yellow autumn foliage, it appears to be resistant to fire blight, and so is a good candidate for further development as an ornamental. It is used as a street tree in Aarhus, Denmark.
