= Johann August Carl Sievers =

German botanist

Johann August Carl Sievers (1762–1795) was a German-born botanist who explored Central Asia, Siberia, and other Asian regions of the Russian Empire. Among the species first described by Sievers is Malus sieversii, the ancestor of the domesticated apple. He died and was buried in Saint Petersburg.

In 1811, botanist Carl Ludwig Willdenow published Sieversia, which is a genus of flowering plants from Russia and Japan from the family Rosaceae and named in honour of Johann August Carl Sievers.
