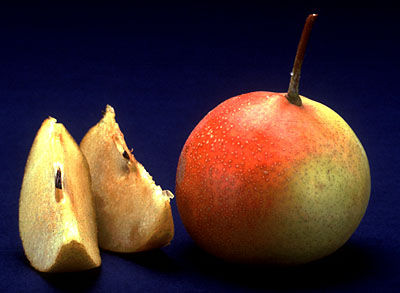

Scientific classification
- Kingdom: Plantae
- Clade: Tracheophytes
- Clade: Angiosperms
- Clade: Eudicots
- Clade: Rosids
- Order: Rosales
- Family: Rosaceae
- Tribe: Maleae
- Subtribe: Malinae
- Genus: × Pyraria; A.Chev.
- Species: × P. irregularis

Binomial name
- × Pyraria irregularis (Münchh.) Sennikov & Kurtto

Synonyms
- Azarolus × pollvilleriana Borkh., nom. superfl.; × Bollwilleria auricularis Zabel, not validly publ.; × Bollwilleria bulbiformis (Tatar) Zabel; × Bollwilleria malifolia (Spach) Zabel; Lazarolus × pollveria (L.) Medik.; Lazarolus pollvilleriana Borkh., nom. superfl.; × Pyraria auricularis A.Chev., nom. superfl.; × Pyraria malifolia (Spach) A.Chev.; Pyrus × auricularis Knoop ex K.Koch, nom. superfl.; Pyrus × bollwylleriana DC., nom. superfl.; Pyrus × bollwylleriana var. bulbiformis Tatar; Pyrus × irregularis Münchh.; Pyrus × malifolia Spach; Pyrus × pollveria L.; Pyrus × tomentosa Moench, nom. superfl.; × Sorbopyrus auricularis C.K.Schneid., nom. superfl.; × Sorbopyrus auricularis var. bulbiformis (Tatar) C.K.Schneid.; × Sorbopyrus bollwilleriana P.Fourn., nom. superfl.; × Sorbopyrus irregularis (Münchh.) C.A.Wimm.; Sorbus × bollwilleriana Beissn., nom. superfl.

= Shipova =

Hybrid pear

The shipova, scientific name × Pyraria irregularis, synonyms including × Sorbopyrus irregularis, is a hybrid of the European pear (Pyrus communis) and the common whitebeam (Aria edulis). It is a small to medium-sized tree growing to 10–18 m tall (or 4–6 m on dwarfing rootstock), with deciduous oval leaves 7–11 cm long and 5–6 cm broad. The fruit is a pome 2.5–3 cm long; it is edible with a sweet, yellowish flesh, which tastes similar to a Nashi pear.

== History ==
The hybrid, known as the Bollwiller pear, first arose at Bollwiller in Alsace, France, before 1612, and has mostly been propagated by grafting since then; it is nearly sterile, only rarely producing any viable seeds. Two successful seedling propagations have been named as the cultivar 'Bulbiformis' and as the species Pyrus malifolia, but shipova trees are not widely cultivated.

Shipova is the only known species in the hybrid nothogenus Aria × Pyrus (also known as × Pyraria).

== Similar hybrids ==
Other intergeneric hybrids within tribe Maleae that include Sorbus as one of the parents are:

- × Amelasorbus
- × Crataegosorbus
- × Malosorbus
- × Sorbaronia
- × Sorbocotoneaster
