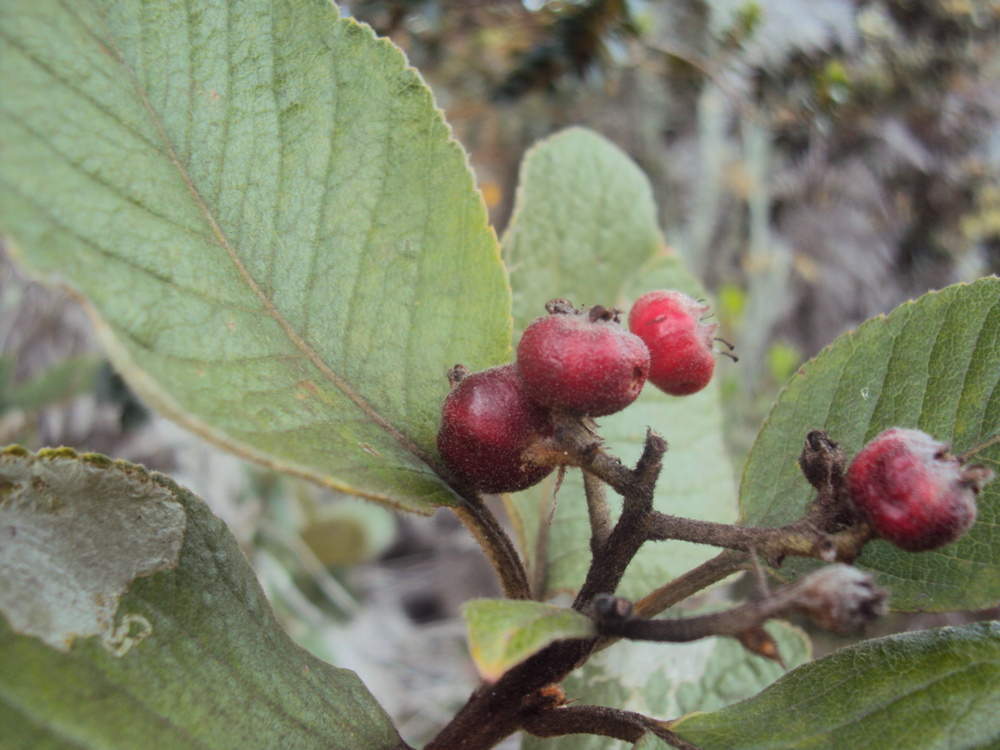
- Hesperomeles ferruginea

Scientific classification
- Kingdom: Plantae
- Clade: Tracheophytes
- Clade: Angiosperms
- Clade: Eudicots
- Clade: Rosids
- Order: Rosales
- Family: Rosaceae
- Subfamily: Amygdaloideae
- Tribe: Maleae
- Subtribe: Malinae
- Genus: Hesperomeles; Lindl.

= Hesperomeles =

Hesperomeles Temporal range: Eocene - recent

Genus of flowering plants

Hesperomeles is a genus of South American evergreen trees of the family Rosaceae that has sometimes been included along with Pyracantha in the genus Osteomeles. However, Osteomeles notably have compound leaves, and recent molecular phylogenetics suggests that Hesperomeles is only distantly related to Osteomeles, and is instead sister to the Crataegus—Mespilus clade.

== Species ==
Depending on the author, there are between 12 and 20 species in the genus. According to Tropicos.org database, the following species are recognized:

- Hesperomeles cordata
- Hesperomeles ferruginea
- Hesperomeles gayana
- Hesperomeles goudotiana
- Hesperomeles incerta
- Hesperomeles nitida
- Hesperomeles obtusifolia
- Hesperomeles pachyphylla
- Hesperomeles palcensis
- Hesperomeles personii
- Hesperomeles resinopunctata
- Hesperomeles weberbaueri
