= Taihangia =

Scientific classification
- Kingdom: Plantae
- Clade: Tracheophytes
- Clade: Angiosperms
- Clade: Eudicots
- Clade: Rosids
- Order: Rosales
- Family: Rosaceae
- Subfamily: Rosoideae
- Tribe: Colurieae
- Genus: Taihangia; T.T.Yu & C.L.Li
- Species: T. rupestris

Binomial name
- Taihangia rupestris T.T.Yu & C.L.Li

Synonyms
- Geum rupestre (T.T.Yu & C.L.Li) Smedmark; Taihangia rupestris var. ciliata T.T.Yu & C.L.Li

Genus of flowering plants

Taihangia is a genus of flowering plants in the family Rosaceae. It includes a single species, Taihangia rupestris, a perennial native to Hebei and northern Henan provinces in central China.
