= Micromeles dunnii =

Scientific classification
- Kingdom: Plantae
- Clade: Embryophytes
- Clade: Tracheophytes
- Clade: Angiosperms
- Clade: Eudicots
- Clade: Rosids
- Order: Rosales
- Family: Rosaceae
- Tribe: Maleae
- Subtribe: Malinae
- Genus: Micromeles
- Species: M. dunnii

Binomial name
- Micromeles dunnii (Rehder) Mezhenskyj (2018)

Synonyms
- Aria dunnii (Rehder) H.Ohashi & Iketani (1993); Dunnaria dunnii (Rehder) Rushforth (2018); Pyrus dunnii (Rehder) M.F.Fay & Christenh. (2018); Pyrus koehnei H.Lév. (1912), nom. illeg. homonym. post.; Sorbus dunnii Rehder (1915)

Monotypic genus of flowering plants

Micromeles dunnii is a species of flowering plant in the rose family, Rosaceae. It is a tree native to southern China.

It is distinguished from other Sorboids (Sorbus and relatives) by leaves which are silvery hairy (tomentose) on the undersides with rufous hairs on veins, and by flowers/fruits in corymbs.

The species was first described as Sorbus dunnii by Alfred Rehder in 1915. In 2018 Volodymyr Mykolaiovych Mezhenskyj placed it in genus Micromeles M. dunnii.
