= Phippsiomeles =

Scientific classification
- Kingdom: Plantae
- Clade: Tracheophytes
- Clade: Angiosperms
- Clade: Eudicots
- Clade: Rosids
- Order: Rosales
- Family: Rosaceae
- Genus: Phippsiomeles; B.B.Liu & J.Wen

Species
- 5; see text

Genus of flowering plants

Phippsiomeles is a genus of flowering plants in the rose family, Rosaceae. It includes five species of trees native to Mexico and Central America.

- Phippsiomeles guerreris (J.B.Phipps) B.B.Liu & J.Wen – southwestern Mexico (Guerrero)
- Phippsiomeles matudae (Lundell) B.B.Liu & J.Wen – Veracruz, southeastern Mexico, and Guatemala
- Phippsiomeles mexicana (Baill.) B.B.Liu & J.Wen – northeastern, central, and southern Mexico
- Phippsiomeles microcarpa (Standl.) B.B.Liu & J.Wen – northeastern Mexico to Panama
- Phippsiomeles oblongifolia (Standl.) B.B.Liu & J.Wen – southwestern Mexico (Nayarit to Michoacán)
