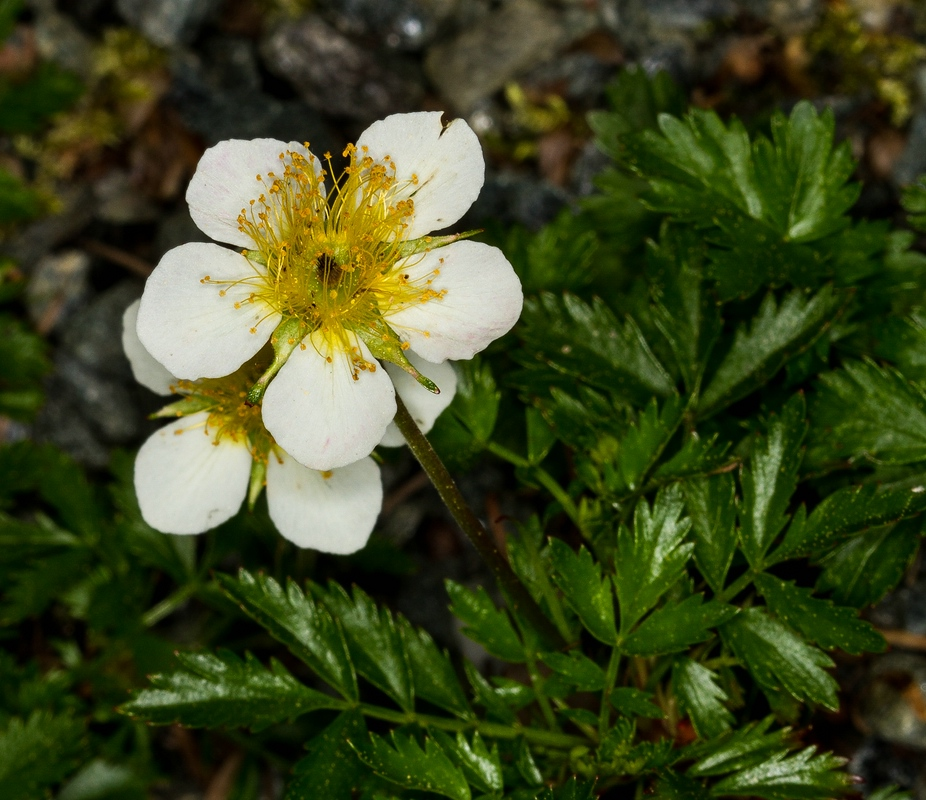
- Geum pentapetalum synonym of Sieversia pentapetala

Scientific classification
- Kingdom: Plantae
- Clade: Tracheophytes
- Clade: Angiosperms
- Clade: Eudicots
- Clade: Rosids
- Order: Rosales
- Family: Rosaceae
- Subfamily: Rosoideae
- Tribe: Colurieae
- Genus: Sieversia; Willd.

Species
- See text

= Sieversia =

Genus of Rosaceae plants

Sieversia is a genus of flowering plants of the family Rosaceae. It is also in the subfamily Rosoideae, and tribe Colurieae.

Its native range is the Russian Far East (within the federal subjects of Kamchatka, Khabarovsk, Magadan, Primorye and Sakhalin including the Kuril Islands) to Japan and the Aleutian Islands.

The genus name of Sieversia is in honour of Johann August Carl Sievers (1762–1795), a German-born botanist who explored Central Asia, Siberia, and other Asian regions of the Russian Empire. It was first described and published in Mag. Neuesten Entdeck. Gesammten Naturk. Ges. Naturf. Freunde Berlin Vol.5 on page 397 in 1811.

== Known species ==
According to Plants of the World Online:

- Sieversia pentapetala (L.) Greene
- Sieversia pusilla (Gaertn.) Hultén
