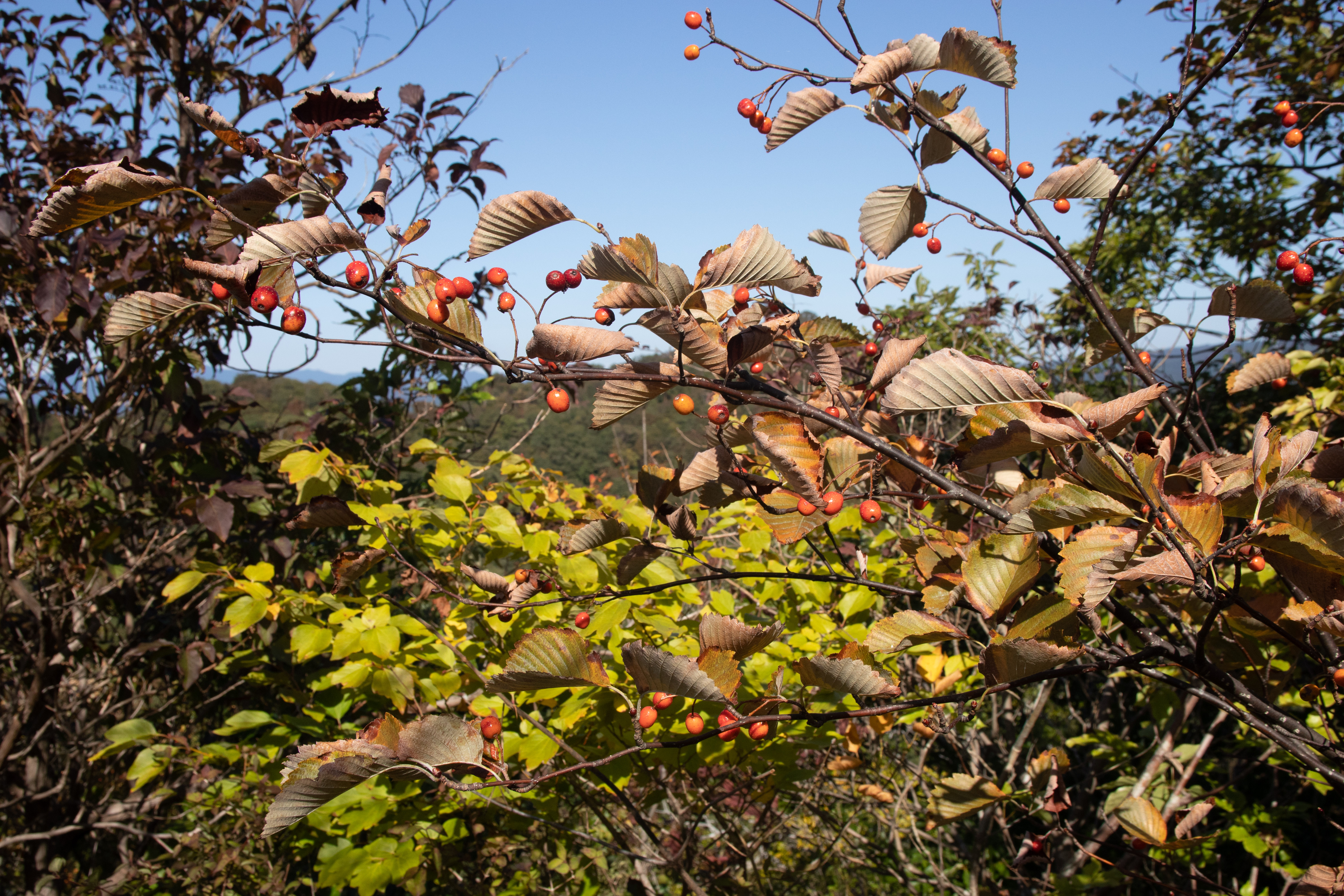
- Micromeles japonica

Scientific classification
- Kingdom: Plantae
- Clade: Embryophytes
- Clade: Tracheophytes
- Clade: Angiosperms
- Clade: Eudicots
- Clade: Rosids
- Order: Rosales
- Family: Rosaceae
- Subfamily: Amygdaloideae
- Tribe: Maleae
- Subtribe: Malinae
- Genus: Micromeles; Decne.

Synonyms
- Alniaria Rushforth; Dunnaria Rushforth; Griffitharia Rushforth; Thomsonaria Rushforth; Wilsonaria Rushforth

= Micromeles =

Genus of plants

Micromeles is a genus of flowering plants in the family Rosaceae native to the region from Afghanistan to the Russian Far East, Japan, and Sumatra.

== Taxonomy ==
It was described by Joseph Decaisne in 1874.

=== Species ===
56 species are accepted.

- Micromeles alnifolia (Siebold & Zucc.) Koehne
- Micromeles ambrozyana (C.K.Schneid.) Mezhenskyj
- Micromeles aronioides (Rehder) Kovanda & Challice
- Micromeles astateria (Cardot) Mezhenskyj
- Micromeles atrosanguinea (T.T.Yu & H.T.Tsai) Mezhenskyj
- Micromeles brevipetiolata (T.H.Nguyên & Yakovlev) Mezhenskyj
- Micromeles burtonsmithiorum (Rushforth) Mezhenskyj
- Micromeles calcicola (W.B.Liao & W.Guo) Mezhenskyj
- Micromeles calocarpa (Rehder) M.Aizawa
- Micromeles caloneura Stapf
- Micromeles coronata (Cardot) Mezhenskyj
- Micromeles corymbifera (Miq.) Kalkman
- Micromeles cuspidata (Bertol.) C.K.Schneid.
- Micromeles decaisneana (Lavallée) C.K.Schneid.
- Micromeles dunnii (Rehder) Mezhenskyj
- Micromeles epidendron (Hand.-Mazz.) Kovanda & Challice
- Micromeles ferruginea (Wenz.) Koehne
- Micromeles folgneri C.K.Schneid.
- Micromeles globosa (T.T.Yu & H.T.Tsai) Mezhenskyj
- Micromeles granulosa (Bertol.) C.K.Schneid.
- Micromeles griffithii Decne.
- Micromeles guanii (Rushforth) Mezhenskyj
- Micromeles hedlundii (C.K.Schneid.) Mezhenskyj
- Micromeles hemsleyi C.K.Schneid.
- Micromeles heseltinei (Rushforth) Mezhenskyj
- Micromeles hudsonii (Rushforth) Mezhenskyj
- Micromeles japonica (Decne.) Koehne
- Micromeles karchungii (Rushforth) Mezhenskyj
- Micromeles khasiana Decne.
- Micromeles lanata (D.Don) Mezhenskyj
- Micromeles ligustrifolia (A.Chev.) Mezhenskyj
- Micromeles malayensis Ridl.
- Micromeles megalocarpa (Rehder) Mezhenskyj
- Micromeles meliosmifolia (Rehder) Kovanda & Challice
- Micromeles needhamii (Rushforth) Mezhenskyj
- Micromeles ochracea (Hand.-Mazz.) Mezhenskyj
- Micromeles pallescens (Rehder) Mezhenskyj
- Micromeles paucinerva (Merr.) Rushforth
- Micromeles prunifolia (W.B.Liao & H.J.Jing) Mezhenskyj
- Micromeles rhamnoides Decne.
- Micromeles rhombifolia (C.J.Qi & K.W.Liu) Mezhenskyj
- Micromeles schwerinii C.K.Schneid.
- Micromeles sharmae (M.F.Watson, V.Manandhar & Rushforth) Mezhenskyj
- Micromeles spongbergii (Rushforth) Mezhenskyj
- Micromeles subochracea (T.T.Yu & L.T.Lu) Mezhenskyj
- Micromeles subulata (J.E.Vidal) Mezhenskyj
- Micromeles thibetica (Cardot) Mezhenskyj
- Micromeles thomsonii (King ex Hook.f.) C.K.Schneid.
- Micromeles tsinlingensis (C.L.Tang) Mezhenskyj
- Micromeles vestita (Wall. ex G.Don) Mezhenskyj
- Micromeles wardii (Merr.) Mezhenskyj
- Micromeles yongdeensis (Rushforth) Mezhenskyj
- Micromeles yuana (Spongberg) Mezhenskyj
- Micromeles yuarguta (H.Ohashi & Iketani) ined.
- Micromeles zahlbruckneri (C.K.Schneid.) Mezhenskyj

== Distribution and habitat ==
It is native to Afghanistan, Assam, Cambodia, China, East Himalaya, Hainan, Japan, Korea, Laos, Malaya, Manchuria, Myanmar, Nepal, Pakistan, Primorye, Sumatra, Taiwan, Thailand, Tibet, Vietnam, and West Himalaya.
