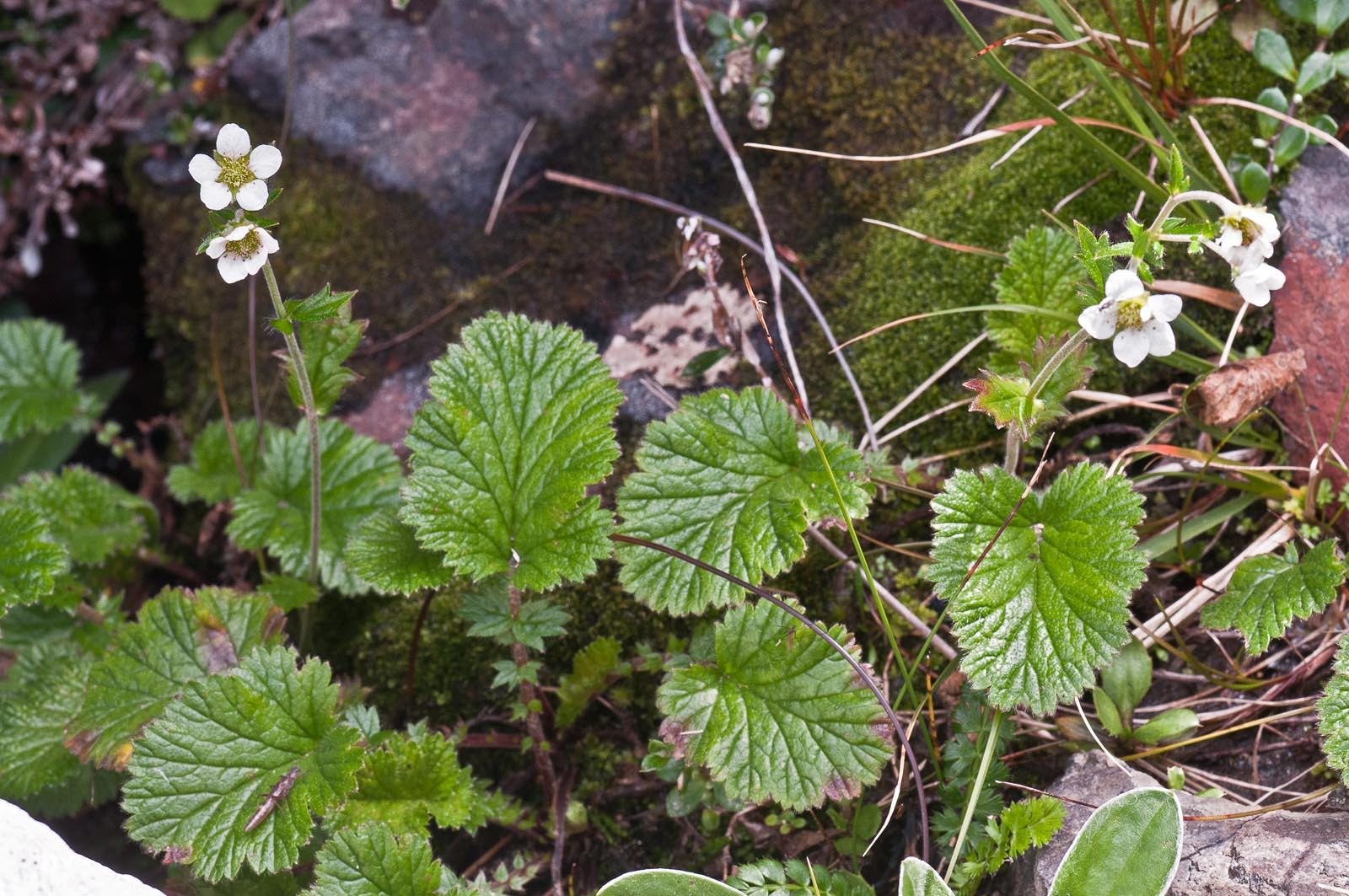
- Oncostylus cockaynei

Scientific classification
- Kingdom: Plantae
- Clade: Tracheophytes
- Clade: Angiosperms
- Clade: Eudicots
- Clade: Rosids
- Order: Rosales
- Family: Rosaceae
- Subfamily: Rosoideae
- Tribe: Colurieae
- Genus: Oncostylus (Schltdl.) F.Bolle

= Oncostylus =

Genus of flowering plants

Oncostylus is a genus of flowering plants in the family Rosaceae. It includes nine species with a disjunct distribution across the temperate and subantarctic Southern Hemisphere, including the Antipodean Islands, southern Argentina, southern Brazil, southern Chile, New Zealand, and Tasmania.

== Species ==
Nine species are accepted.

- Oncostylus albiflorus (Hook.f.) F.Bolle
- Oncostylus cockaynei F.Bolle
- Oncostylus divergens (Cheeseman) F.Bolle
- Oncostylus involucratus (Juss. ex Pers.) F.Bolle
- Oncostylus lechlerianus (Schltdl.) F.Bolle
- Oncostylus leiospermus (Petrie) F.Bolle
- Oncostylus pusillus (Petrie) F.Bolle
- Oncostylus renifolius F.Bolle
- Oncostylus uniflorus (Buchanan) F.Bolle
