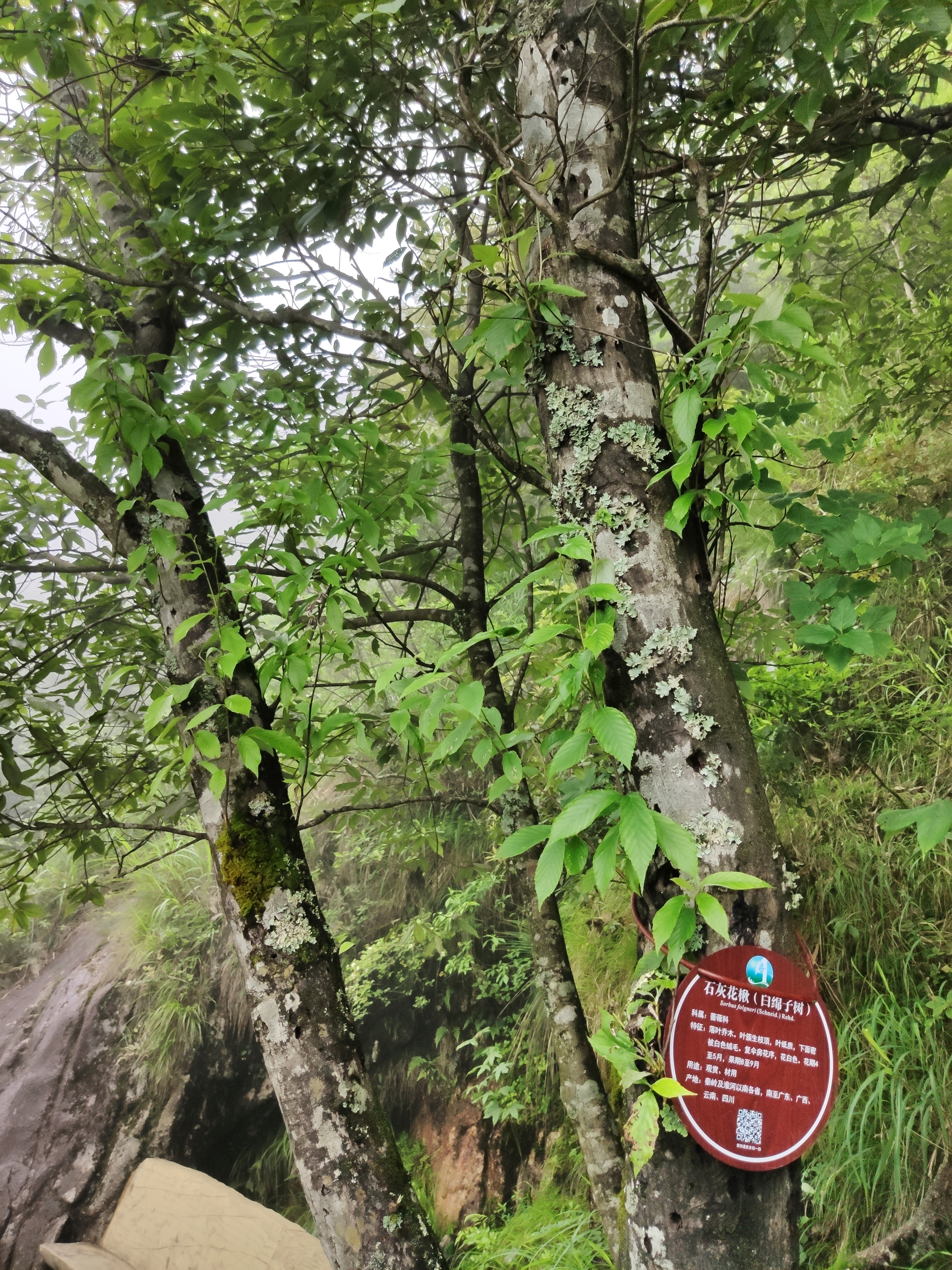

Scientific classification
- Kingdom: Plantae
- Clade: Embryophytes
- Clade: Tracheophytes
- Clade: Spermatophytes
- Clade: Angiosperms
- Clade: Eudicots
- Clade: Rosids
- Order: Rosales
- Family: Rosaceae
- Genus: Alniaria
- Species: A. folgneri

Binomial name
- Alniaria folgneri (C.K.Schneid.) Rushforth

Synonyms
- List: Aria folgneri (C.K.Schneid.) H.Ohashi & Iketani; Micromeles folgneri C.K.Schneid.; Sorbus folgneri (C.K.Schneid.) Rehder; Sorbus folgneri var. duplicatodentata T.T.Yu & L.T.Lu

= Alniaria folgneri =

Species of flowering plant

Alniaria folgneri (syn. Sorbus folgneri), Folgner's whitebeam, is a species of flowering plant in the family Rosaceae, native to central China. A small tree, the abaxial side of its soft leaves are covered in a silvery-white tomentose layer. Its autumn foliage often turns golden pink, set off by the white undersides, but the intensity of the color varies from year to year. Its cultivar 'Emiel' has gained the Royal Horticultural Society's Award of Garden Merit.
