= Fallugia =

Conservation status
- Secure (NatureServe)

Scientific classification
- Kingdom: Plantae
- Clade: Tracheophytes
- Clade: Angiosperms
- Clade: Eudicots
- Clade: Rosids
- Order: Rosales
- Family: Rosaceae
- Subfamily: Rosoideae
- Tribe: Colurieae
- Genus: Fallugia; Endl.
- Species: F. paradoxa

Binomial name
- Fallugia paradoxa (D.Don ex Tilloch & R.Taylor) Endl. ex Torr.

Synonyms
- Fallugia acuminata (Wooton) Cockerell; Fallugia acuminata var. micrantha (Cockerell) Cockerell; Fallugia mexicana Walp.; Fallugia micrantha Cockerell; Fallugia paradoxa var. acuminata Wooton; Geum cercocarpoides DC. ex Ser.; Geum paradoxum (D.Don ex Tilloch & R.Taylor) Steud.; Geum plumosum Moc. & Sessé ex D.Don; Sieversia paradoxa D.Don ex Tilloch & R.Taylor

Genus of flowering plants

Fallugia is a monotypic genus of flowering plants containing the single species Fallugia paradoxa, which is known by the common names Apache plume and póñil. This plant is native to the southwestern and south-central United States and northern Mexico, where it is found in arid habitats such as desert woodlands and scrub.

== Description ==
Fallugia paradoxa is an erect shrub not exceeding two meters in height. It has light gray or whitish peeling bark on its many thin branches. The leaves are each about a centimeter long and deeply lobed with the edges rolled under. The upper surface of the leaf is green and hairy while the underside is duller in color and scaly.

The flower is roselike when new, with rounded white petals and a center filled with many thready stamens and pistils. The ovary of the flower remains after the white petals fall away, leaving many plumelike lavender styles, each 3 to 5 centimeters long. The plant may be covered with these dark pinkish clusters of curling, feathery styles after flowering. Each style is attached to a developing fruit, which is a small achene. The fruit is dispersed when the wind catches the styles and blows them away. Wasps such as Polistes instabilis commonly feed on its nectar.

== Uses ==
Fallugia paradoxa is considered valuable for erosion control in desert areas where it grows. It is also used in xeric landscaping as an ornamental shrub with habitat value. Visual interest is provided by white flowers in late spring, yielding to pink plumes that gradually fade to white but continue to give the plant a feathery appearance for the duration of the growing season.
