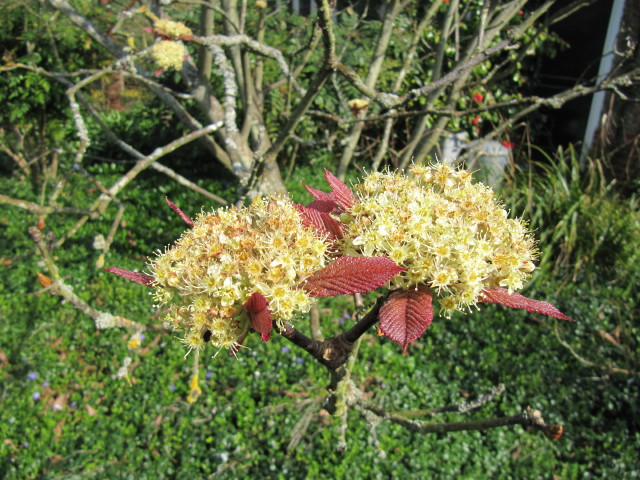

Scientific classification
- Kingdom: Plantae
- Clade: Embryophytes
- Clade: Tracheophytes
- Clade: Spermatophytes
- Clade: Angiosperms
- Clade: Eudicots
- Clade: Rosids
- Order: Rosales
- Family: Rosaceae
- Tribe: Maleae
- Subtribe: Malinae
- Genus: Micromeles
- Species: M. megalocarpa

Binomial name
- Micromeles megalocarpa (Rehder) Mezhenskyj

Synonyms
- Aria megalocarpa (Rehder) H.Ohashi & Iketani; Pyrus megalocarpa (Rehder) Bean; Sorbus megalocarpa Rehder; Wilsonaria megalocarpa (Rehder) Rushforth; Aria megalocarpa var. cuneata (Rehder) H.Ohashi & Iketani; Micromeles guanxianensis (T.C.Ku) Mezhenskyj; Pyrus guanxianensis (T.C.Ku) M.F.Fay & Christenh.; Sorbus guanxianensis T.C.Ku; Sorbus megalocarpa var. cuneata Rehder; Wilsonaria guanxianensis (T.C.Ku) Rushforth

= Micromeles megalocarpa =

Species of tree

Micromeles megalocarpa is a species of tree in the family Rosaceae native to southeastern Tibet and south-central China.

== Description ==
=== Vegetative characteristics ===
Micromeles megalocarpa is a 5–8 m tall shrub or small tree. The conspicuously veined, narrowly oval leaves with a finely-toothed margin are up to 20cm long.

=== Generative characteristics ===
It is a tree characterized by large fruits, 20—30 mm long by 15—20mm in diameter.

== Taxonomy ==
The species was first described as Sorbus megalocarpa in 1915 by Alfred Rehder.

=== Etymology ===
The specific epithet megalocarpa from, the Greek megalo- meaning large or great and -carpus meaning fruit, means having large seeds or fruit.
