= Pentactina =

Scientific classification
- Kingdom: Plantae
- Clade: Tracheophytes
- Clade: Angiosperms
- Clade: Eudicots
- Clade: Rosids
- Order: Rosales
- Family: Rosaceae
- Genus: Pentactina; Nakai (1917)

Type species
- Pentactina rupicola Nakai (1917)

Genus of flowering plants

Pentactina is an oligotypic genus of flowering plants in the family Rosaceae, first described by the Japanese botanist Takenoshin Nakai in 1917. The genus occurs in restricted areas of North Korea and the Russian Far East.

== Description ==
Shrub deciduous. Leaves alternate, simple, without stipules. Inflorescence a terminal panicle. Flower calyx 5-lobed, calyx lobes reflexed during flowering; petals 5, white, linear; stamens 20; carpels 5; ovules 2 per carpel. Fruit follicles, dorsiventrally dehiscent.

== Classification ==
=== Taxonomic history ===
Pentactina was long considered a monotypic genus, represented by its type species Pentactina rupicola Nakai, which is narrowly endemic to North Korea. Its taxonomic treatment was controversial due to the rarity and limited accessibility of P. rupicola: some botanists treated Pentactina as a synonym of the genus Spiraea L., while others supported its generic distinctiveness based on morphological and phylogenetic evidence.

In 2014, Russian botanist V. V. Yakubov published a new combination, Pentactina schlothauerae (Vorosch. & Ignatov) Jakubov, based on morphological comparisons, transferring the species from Spiraea. A subsequent biochemical analysis supported this revision, showing that the phenolic compound composition of P. schlothauerae differed from that of Spiraea species. A later phylogenetic study substantiated a sister relationship between P. rupicola and P. schlothauerae, forming a distinct lineage within the tribe Spiraeeae, separate from other genera including Spiraea.

=== Species ===
The genus Pentactina currently comprises two species:

- Pentactina rupicola Nakai — native to North Korea
- Pentactina schlothauerae (Vorosch. & Ignatov) Jakubov — native to the Russian Far East

== Distribution ==
Pentactina rupicola is endemic to the Kumgangsan Mountains in North Korea, and P. schlothauerae is endemic to the Badzhal Range in the Russian Far East.
