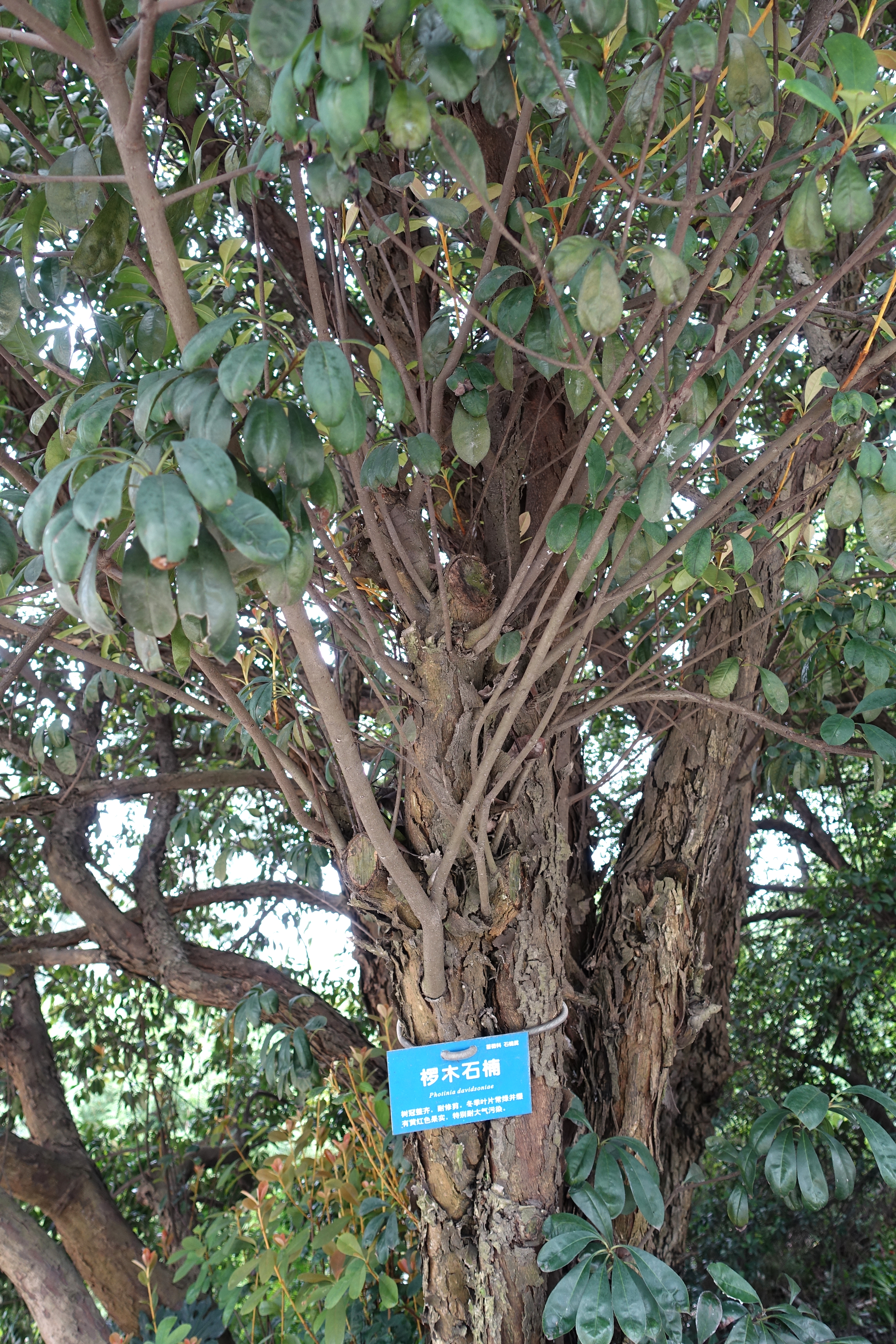
- Weniomeles bodinieri

Scientific classification
- Kingdom: Plantae
- Clade: Tracheophytes
- Clade: Angiosperms
- Clade: Eudicots
- Clade: Rosids
- Order: Rosales
- Family: Rosaceae
- Subfamily: Amygdaloideae
- Tribe: Maleae
- Genus: Weniomeles; B.B.Liu

species
- Weniomeles atropurpurea (P.L.Chiu ex Z.H.Chen & X.F.Jin) B.B.Liu; Weniomeles bodinieri (H.Lév.) B.B.Liu

= Weniomeles =

Genus of flowering plants

Weniomeles is a genus of flowering plants in the family Rosaceae. It includes two species native to central and southern China and northern Vietnam.

- Weniomeles atropurpurea (P.L.Chiu ex Z.H.Chen & X.F.Jin) B.B.Liu – southeastern China (Zhejiang)
- Weniomeles bodinieri (H.Lév.) B.B.Liu – central and southern China and northern Vietnam

The genus was first described by Bin Bin Liu in 2023. Both species had previously been placed in genus Photinia.
