= Chamaecallis =

Scientific classification
- Kingdom: Plantae
- Clade: Tracheophytes
- Clade: Angiosperms
- Clade: Eudicots
- Clade: Rosids
- Order: Rosales
- Family: Rosaceae
- Genus: Chamaecallis; Smedmark (2014)
- Species: C. perpusilloides

Binomial name
- Chamaecallis perpusilloides (W.W.Sm.) Smedmark (2014)

Synonyms
- Potentilla brachystemon Hand.-Mazz. (1923 publ. 1924); Potentilla perpusilloides W.W.Sm. (1911); Sibbaldia perpusilloides (W.W.Sm.) Hand.-Mazz. (1933)

Genus of flowering plants

Chamaecallis perpusilloides is a species of flowering plant belonging to the rose family, Rosaceae. It is a perennial that ranges from the Himalaya to south-central China. It is the sole species in genus Chamaecallis perpusilloides.
