= Pleiosorbus =

Scientific classification
- Kingdom: Plantae
- Clade: Tracheophytes
- Clade: Angiosperms
- Clade: Eudicots
- Clade: Rosids
- Order: Rosales
- Family: Rosaceae
- Subfamily: Amygdaloideae
- Tribe: Maleae
- Subtribe: Malinae
- Genus: Pleiosorbus; L.H.Zhou & C.Y.Wu (2000)

Species
- Pleiosorbus megacarpa L.H.Zhou & C.Y.Wu; Pleiosorbus wardii (C.E.C.Fisch.) Rushforth

Genus of flowering plants

Pleiosorbus is a genus of flowering plants in the rose family, Rosaceae. It includes two species of trees native to the eastern Himalayas, Tibet, and northern Myanmar.

- Pleiosorbus megacarpa L.H.Zhou & C.Y.Wu – Arunachal Pradesh to Southeastern Tibet
- Pleiosorbus wardii (C.E.C.Fisch.) Rushforth – northern Myanmar
