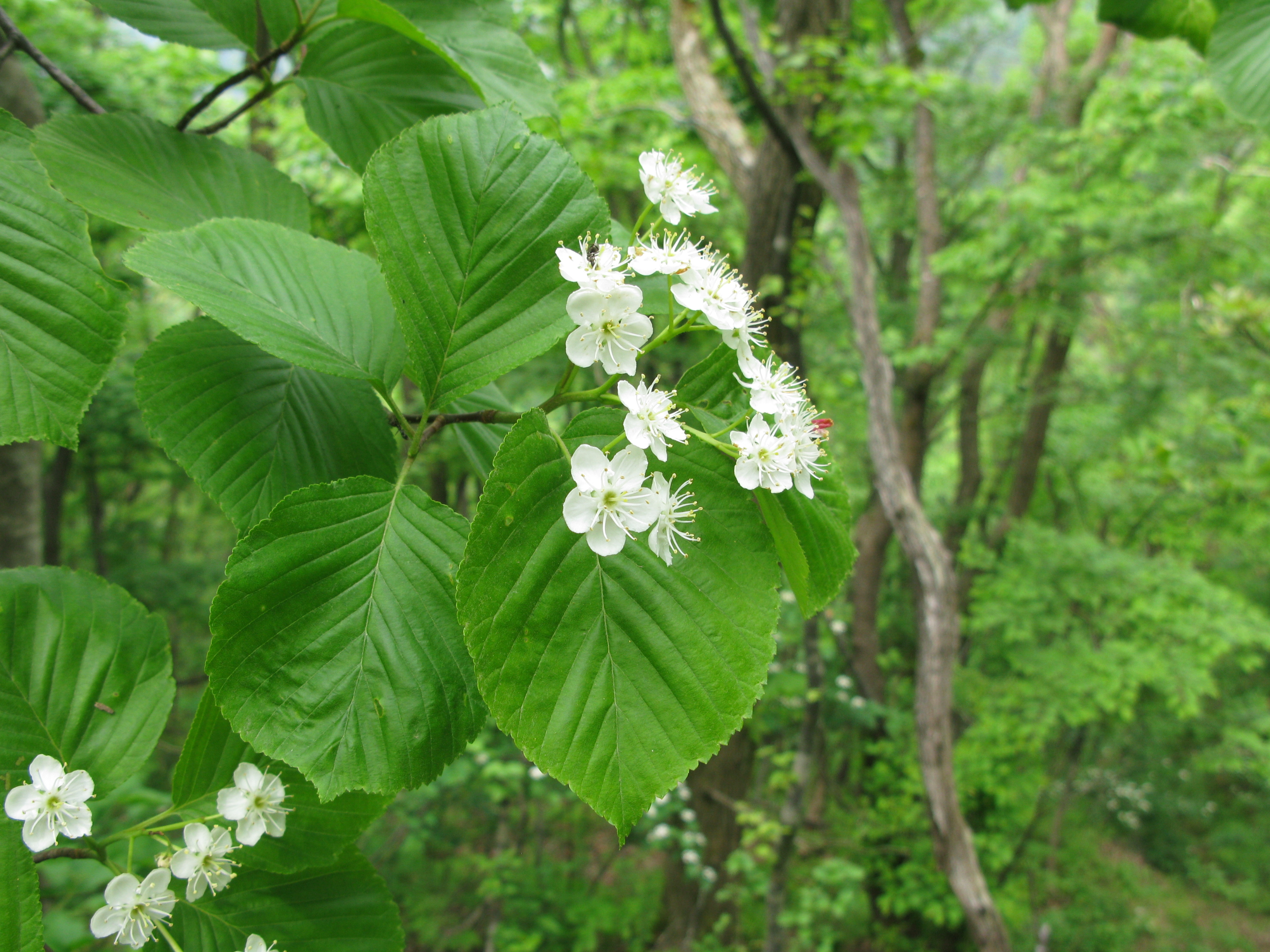
- Alniaria alnifolia

Scientific classification
- Kingdom: Plantae
- Clade: Embryophytes
- Clade: Tracheophytes
- Clade: Spermatophytes
- Clade: Angiosperms
- Clade: Eudicots
- Clade: Rosids
- Order: Rosales
- Family: Rosaceae
- Subfamily: Amygdaloideae
- Tribe: Maleae
- Genus: Alniaria; Rushforth

Species
- See text

= Alniaria =

Genus of flowering plants

Alniaria is a genus of flowering plants in the family Rosaceae, native to China, Taiwan, Korea, Japan, and Far Eastern Russia. It was split off from Sorbus (sensu lato) in 2018.

== Species ==
The following species are accepted:

- Alniaria alnifolia (Siebold & Zucc.) Rushforth
- Alniaria chengii (C.J.Qi) Rushforth
- Alniaria folgneri (C.K.Schneid.) Rushforth
- Alniaria hunanica (C.J.Qi) Rushforth
- Alniaria nubium (Hand.-Mazz.) Rushforth
- Alniaria tsinlingensis (C.L.Tang) Rushforth
- Alniaria yuana (Spongberg) Rushforth
