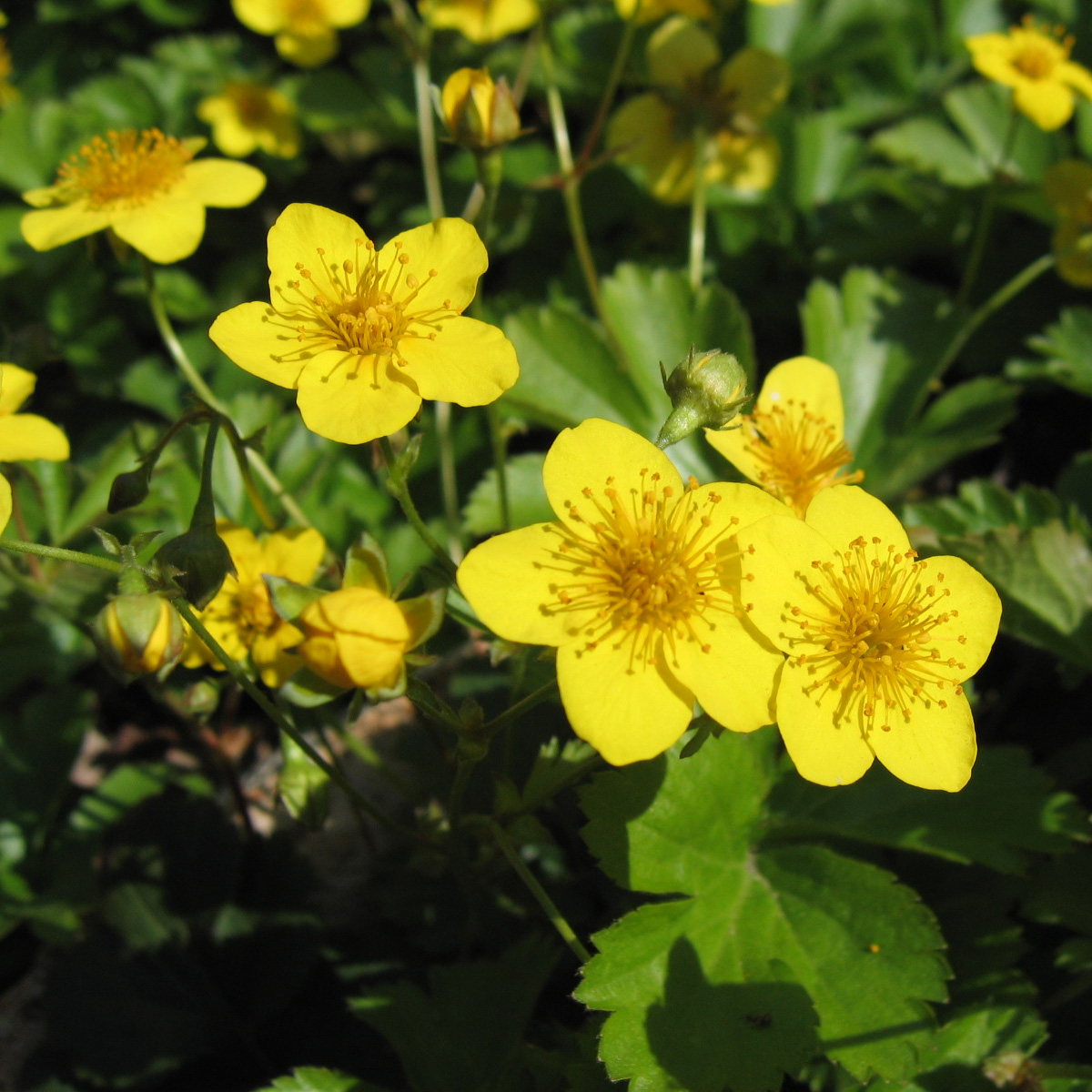
- A living specimen of Waldsteinia ternata displaying its distinctly rounded, overlapping flower petals, the epicalyx featuring narrow mini bractlets between each of the primary sepals, and sharply toothed, serrated leaf margins.

Scientific classification
- Kingdom: Plantae
- Clade: Tracheophytes
- Clade: Angiosperms
- Clade: Eudicots
- Clade: Rosids
- Order: Rosales
- Family: Rosaceae
- Genus: Waldsteinia
- Species: W. ternata

Binomial name
- Waldsteinia ternata (Stephan) Fritsch

Synonyms
- Geum ternata; Siberian barren strawberry; Eurasian barren strawberry; Waldsteinia ternata var. glabriuscula; Comaropsis sibirica; Waldsteinia sibirica; Dalibarda ternata

= Waldsteinia ternata =

Species of Eurasian flowering plant in the rose family

Waldsteinia ternata is a low growing herbaceous perennial plant species belonging to the rose family (Rosaceae). It has a disjunct distribution, being native to Eastern Europe and Eastern Asia, namely the Changbai Mountains of China, Sakhalin and Siberia in Russia. Both the leaves and the flowers of this plant are reminiscent of strawberry. The leaves are trifoliate (hence the specific epithet), arranged in rosettes, glossy, and evergreen in climates with mild winters. The yellow, five petaled flowers appear in late spring or early summer. The fruit is an inedible berry.

== Cultivation ==
Waldsteinia ternata, has been cultivated since at least 1803. The cultivated plants are, for the most part, based on Waldsteinia ternata subsp. trifolia. This plant is widely cultivated in temperate regions as a robust, flowering groundcover. The plant usually grows 10 cm (4 in) to 15 cm (6 in) tall and forms a thick, dense foliage carpet by spreading via stolons and rhizomes. Undemanding of soil conditions, it's used in landscape and garden design as an underplanting or as an edger for a herbaceous border. It is highly adaptable to varied light conditions, performing well from full sun to deep shade. As it can grow well in dappled shade, it is considered appropriate for shade gardens. Neither pests nor diseases pose significant problems. The 'Kronstadt' cultivar has enlarged flowers, while 'Variegata' has variegated leaves.

== Lookalike Species and Commercial Confusion ==
Waldsteinia ternata (Siberian barren strawberry) is frequently mislabeled and sold in North America under the misnomer of their native species Waldsteinia fragarioides (Appalachian barren strawberry). This plant is much easier for commercial growers to rapidly propagate via division of above ground rooted runners, which is a major reason why it accidentally flooded the North American nursery trade. Because the two species share nearly identical three lobed semi evergreen foliage, and yellow five petaled flowers, they are easily misidentified without close inspection of the floral anatomy and leaf margins.

== Taxonomy and identification ==
Waldsteinia ternata and Waldsteinia fragarioides can be definitively distinguished by key morphological traits:

- Petal Structure: Distance between, and shape of, the five petals of the yellow flower blossoms.
- Calyx Anatomy: The green backing (calyx) on the underside of the flower.
- Foliage Morphology: The features of the leaflet edges at the tips.
- Growth and Propagation: The method by which the plant sends out new shoots.

The two species can be reliably differentiated using the following morphological keys:

Feature	Waldsteinia fragarioides (Appalachian barren strawberry)	Waldsteinia ternata (Siberian barren strawberry)
Origin	Native to Eastern North America.	Native to Eurasia (Siberia, East Asia, and parts of Central Europe).
Flower Petals	Slender, narrow, and widely spaced, with distinct, open green gaps between them. W. fragarioides flower	Broad and rounded; petals often touch or overlap. W. ternata flower
Calyx Structure	Lacks an epicalyx. It possesses only five smooth primary sepals. W. fragarioides with only the five primary sepals	Prominent epicalyx present, featuring an additional five narrow secondary mini bractlets between each of the five primary sepals. W. ternata with more than just five primary sepals
Leaf Margins	Shallowly rounded, and crenate. W. fragarioides leaf	Jagged, and sharply serrated. W. ternata leaf
Spread & Growth	Spreads slowly only via underground rhizomes; lacks above ground surface runners.	Roots grow at nodes along creeping above ground stolons. Also produces short rhizomes.

== Images ==
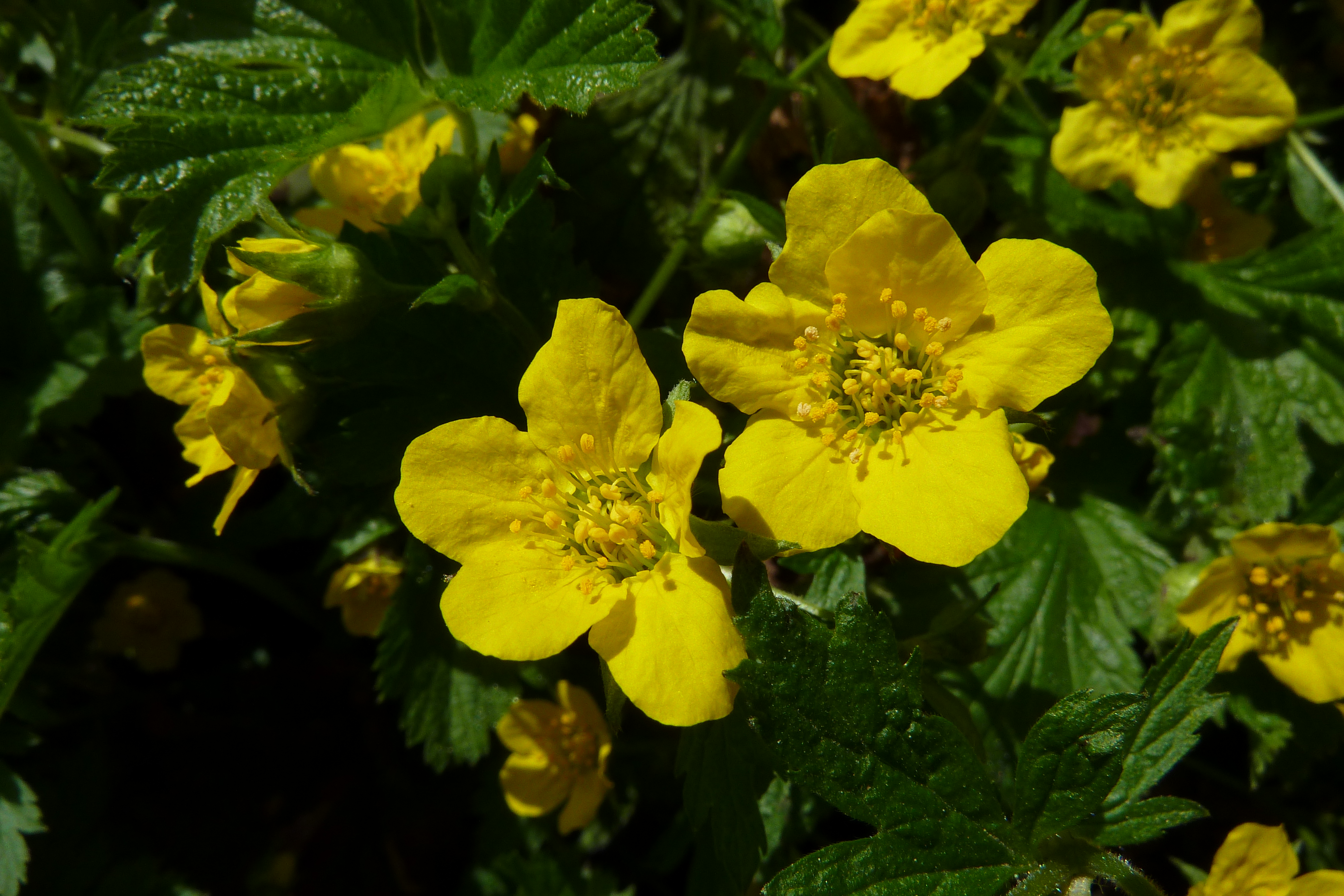

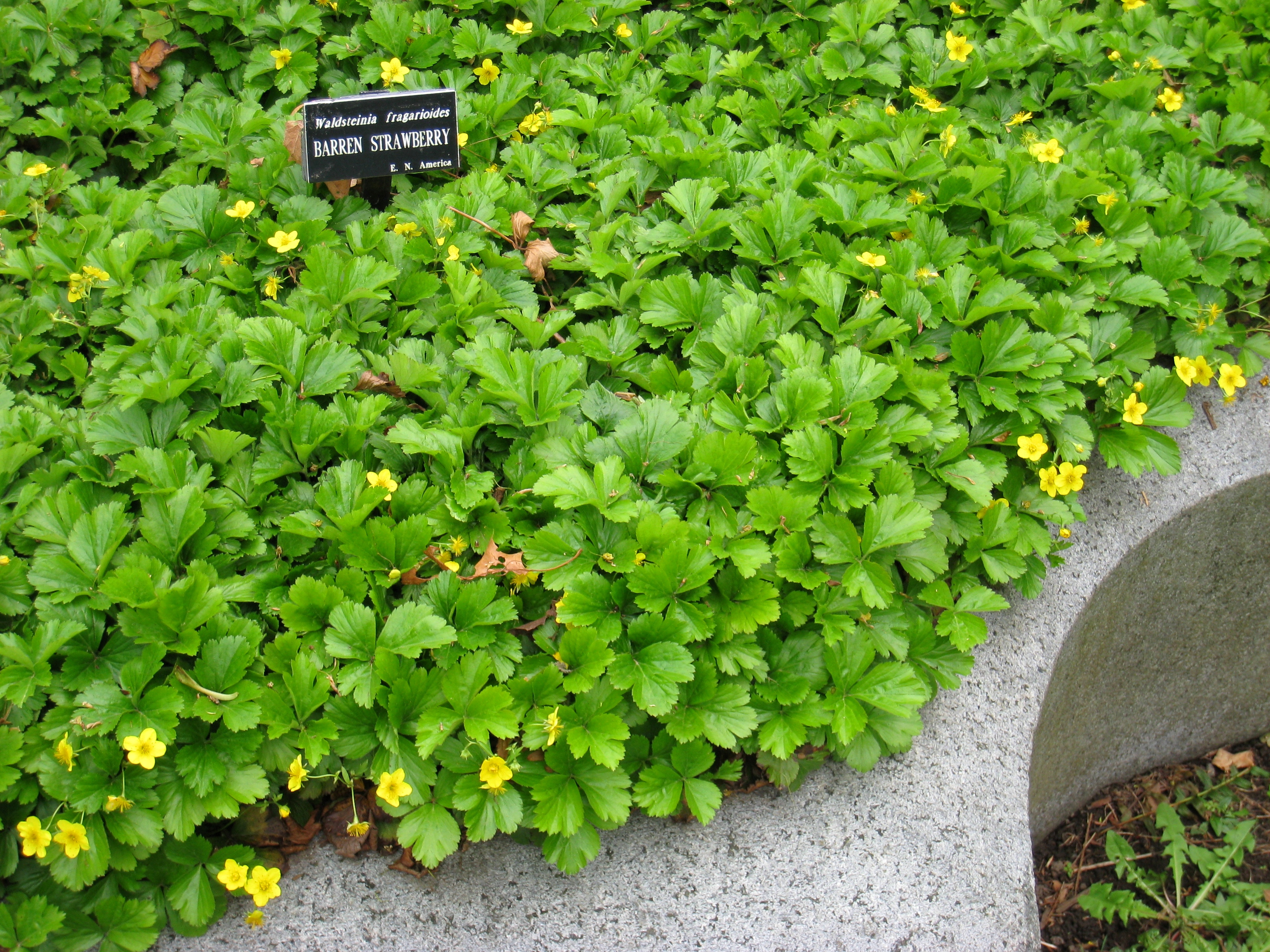
Waldsteinia ternata, mislabeled, growing in Mount Auburn Cemetery, Cambridge, Massachusetts, USA.

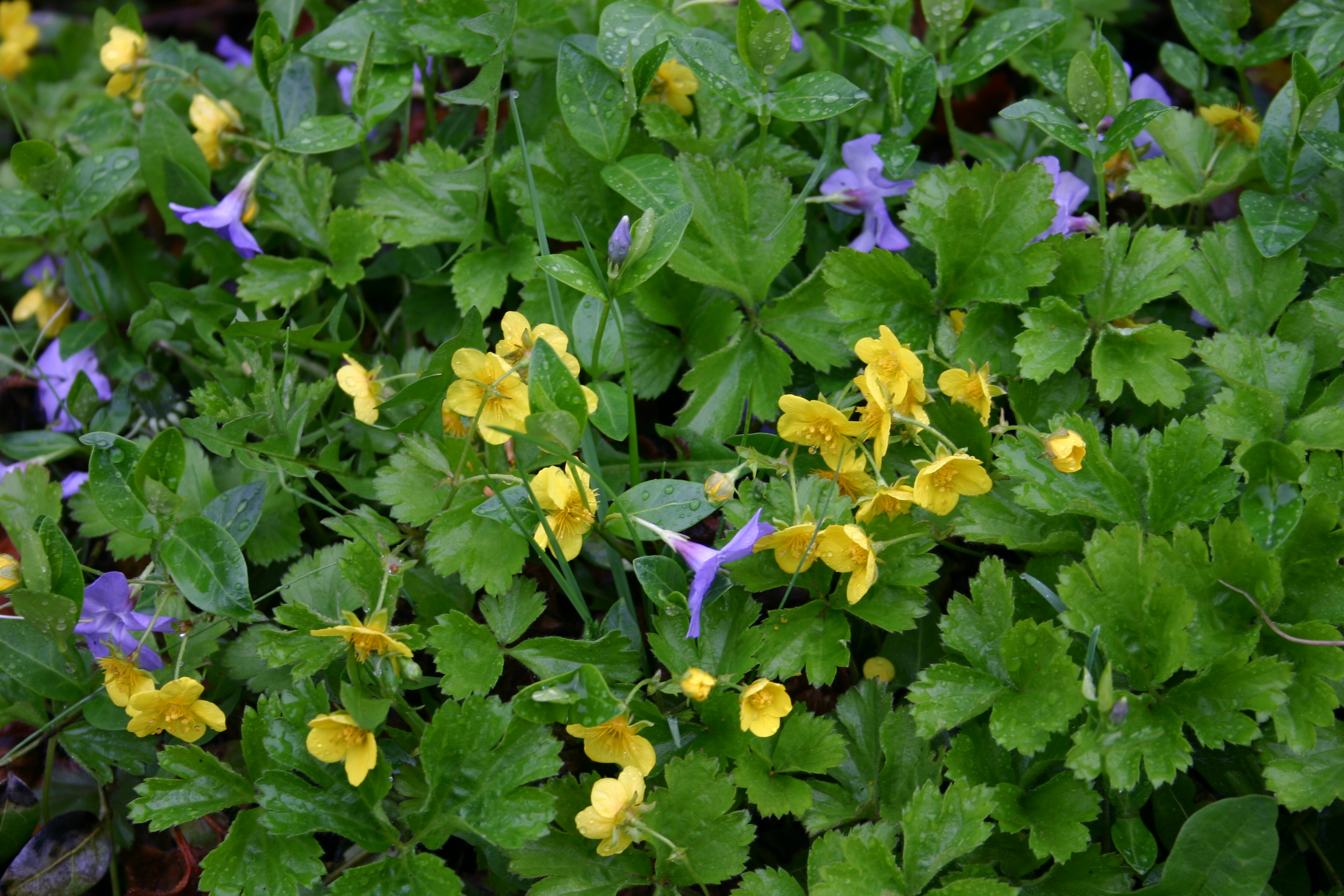
Waldsteinia ternata and Vinca minor growing together.

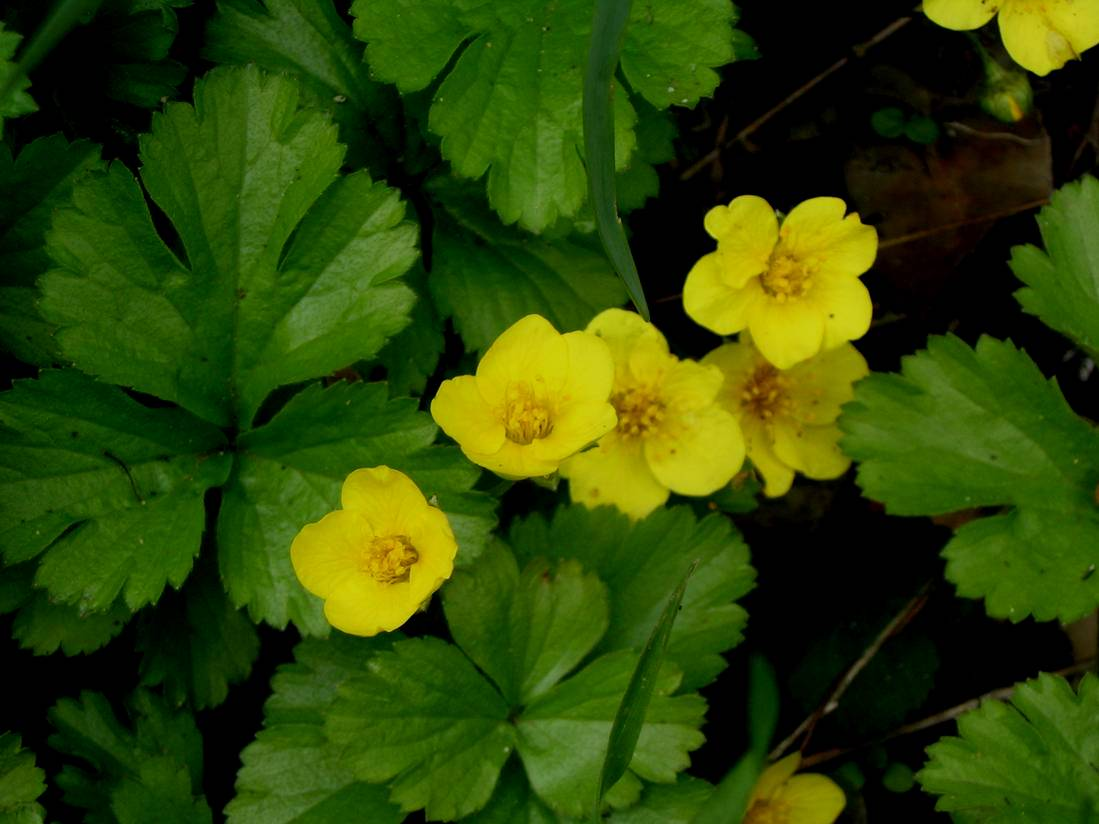

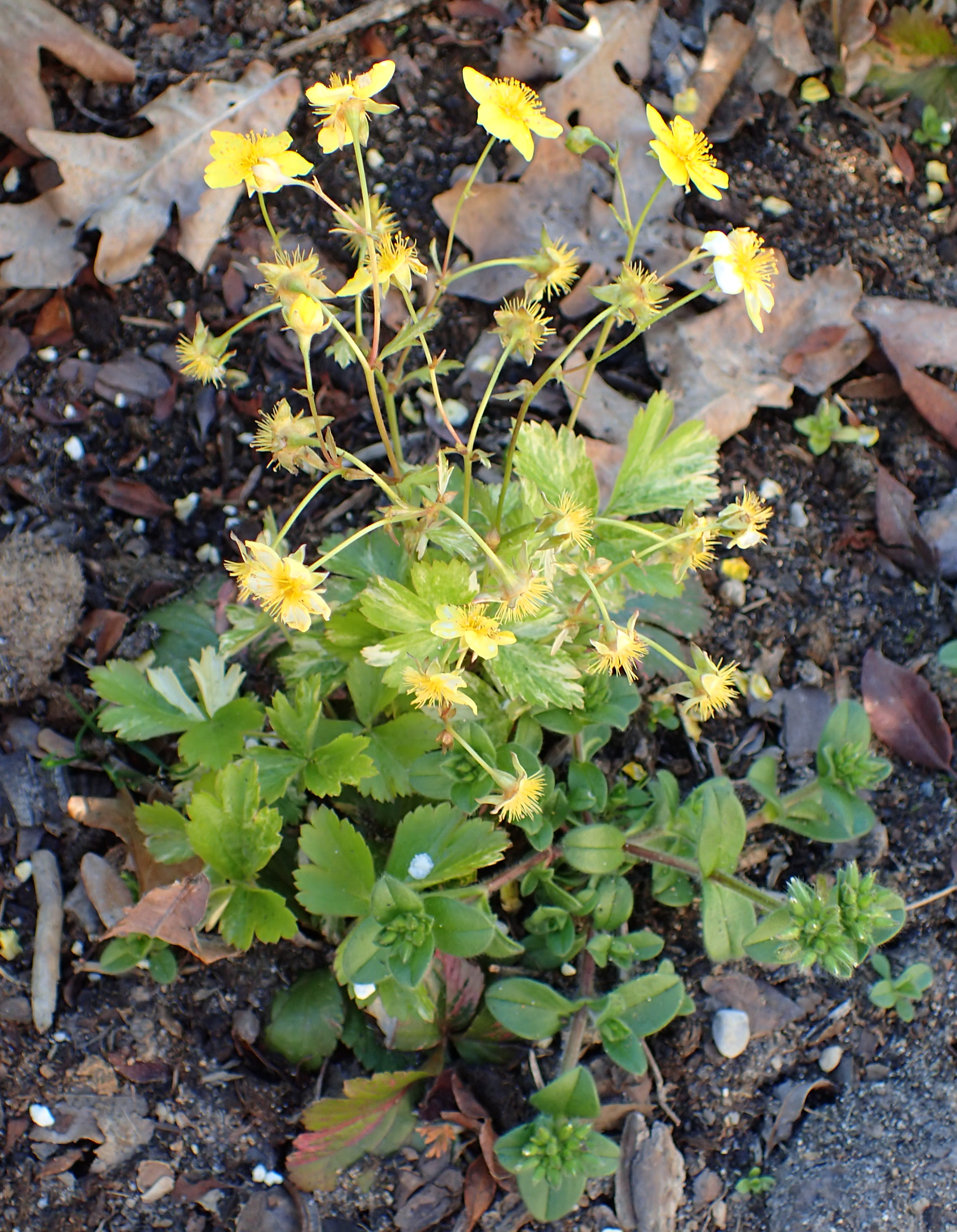

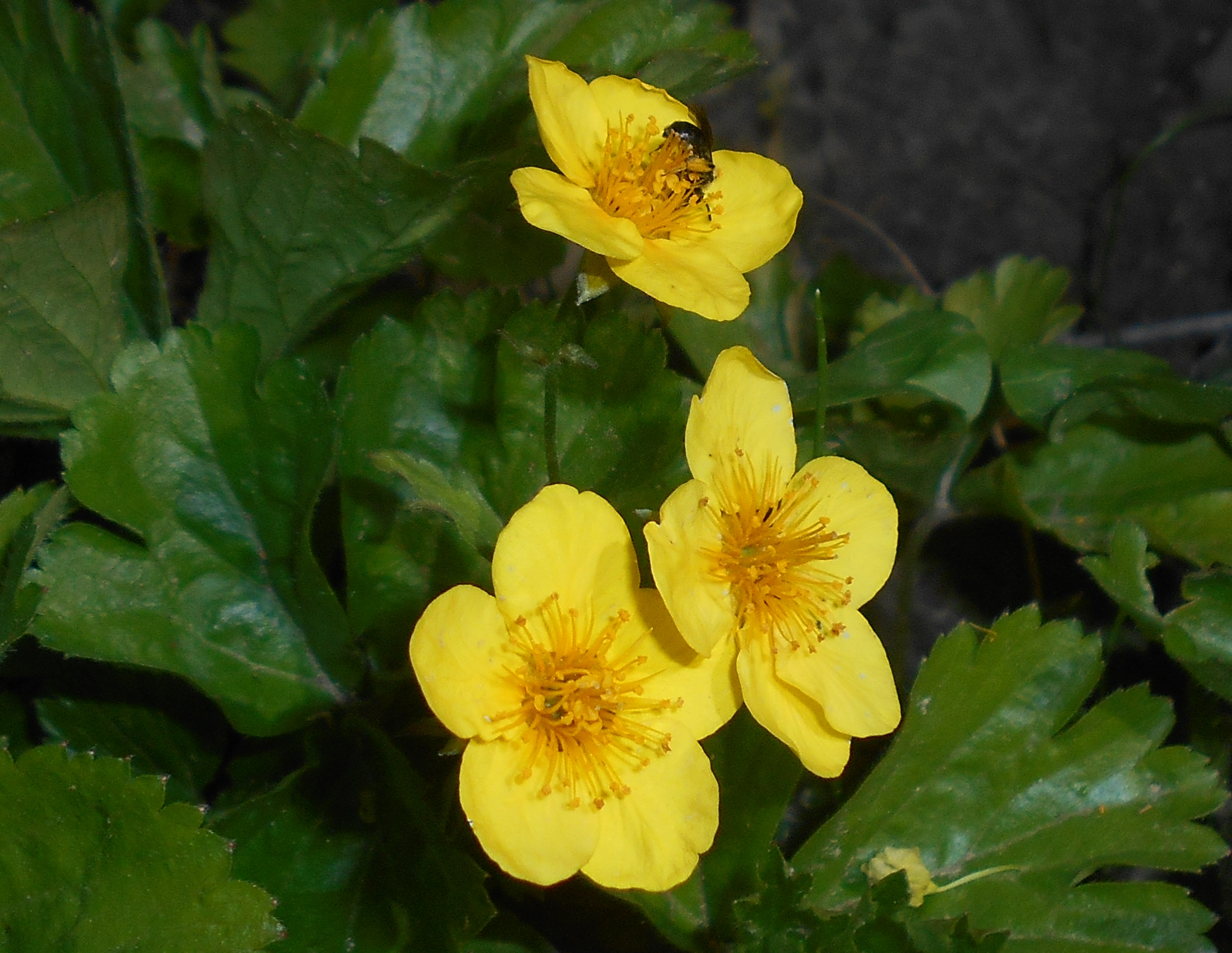

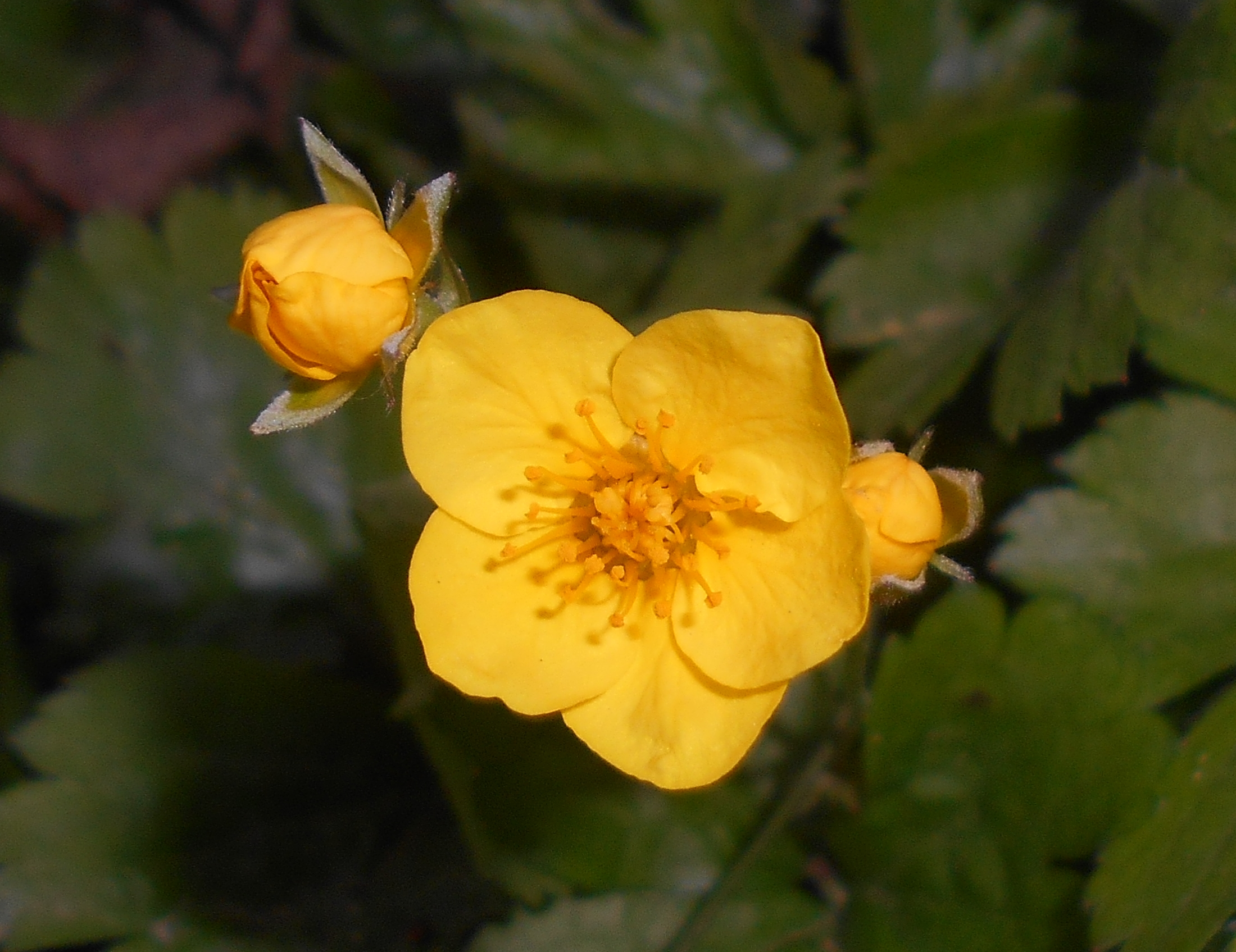

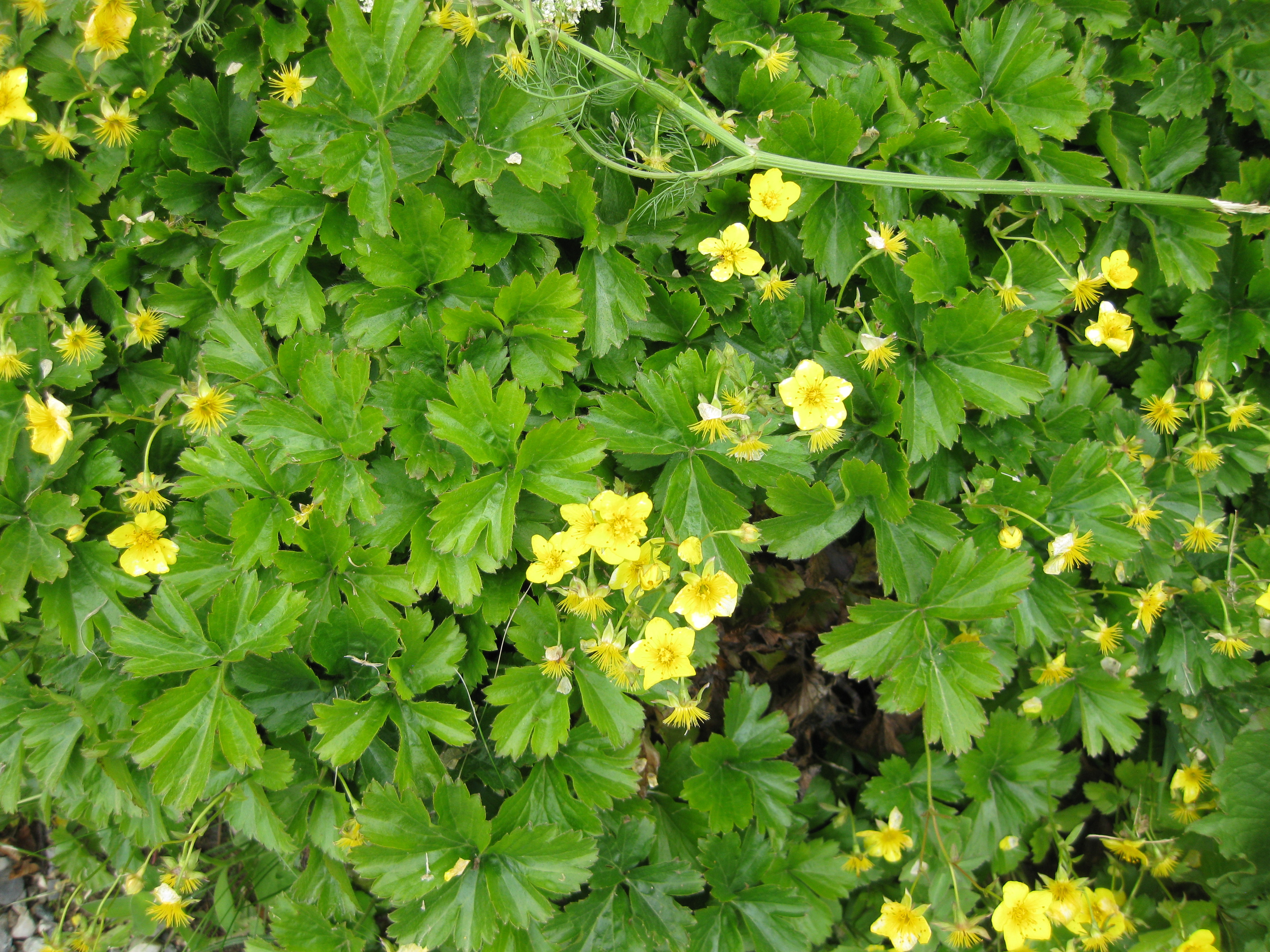
Groundcover view showcasing foliage.

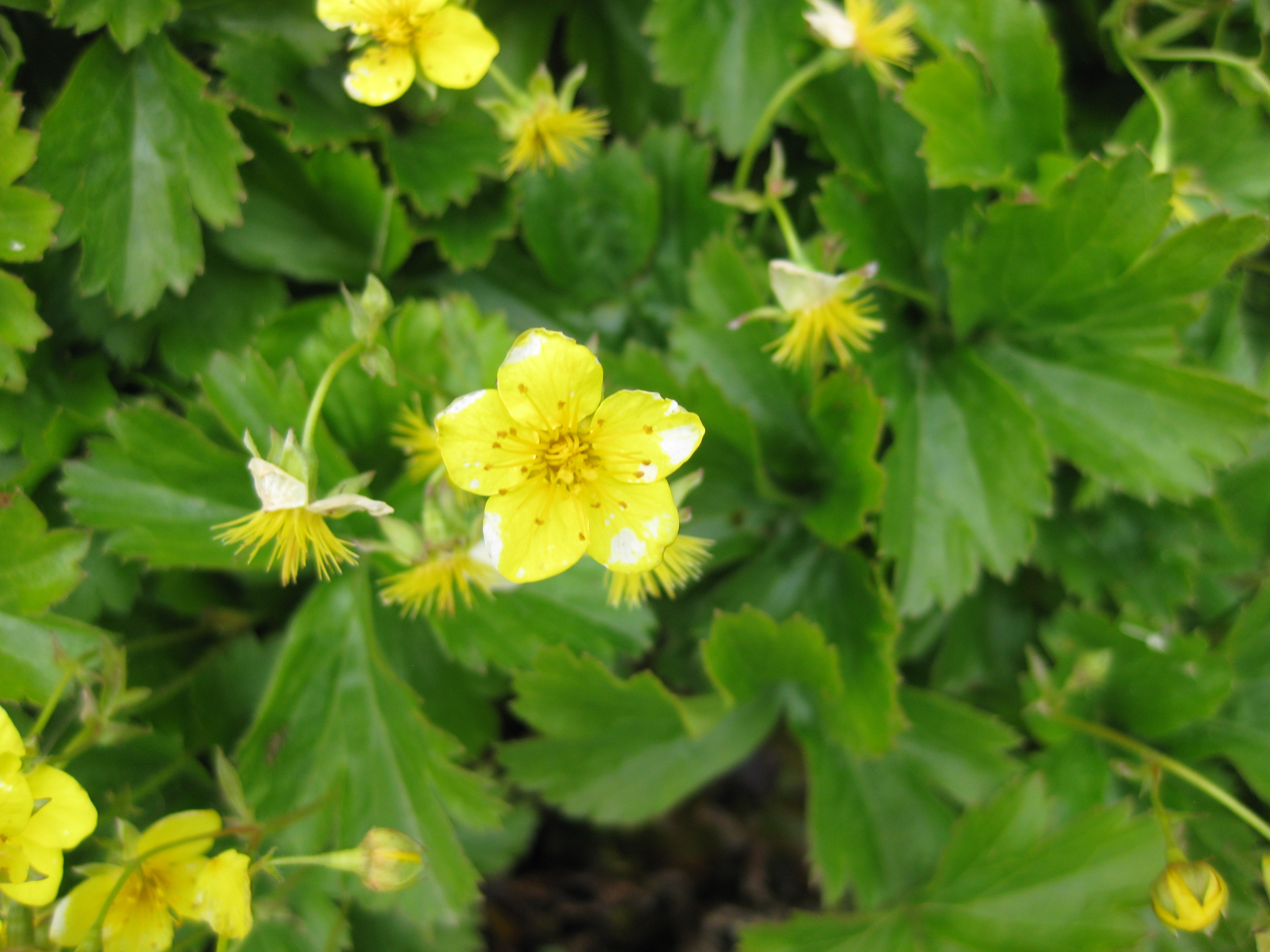

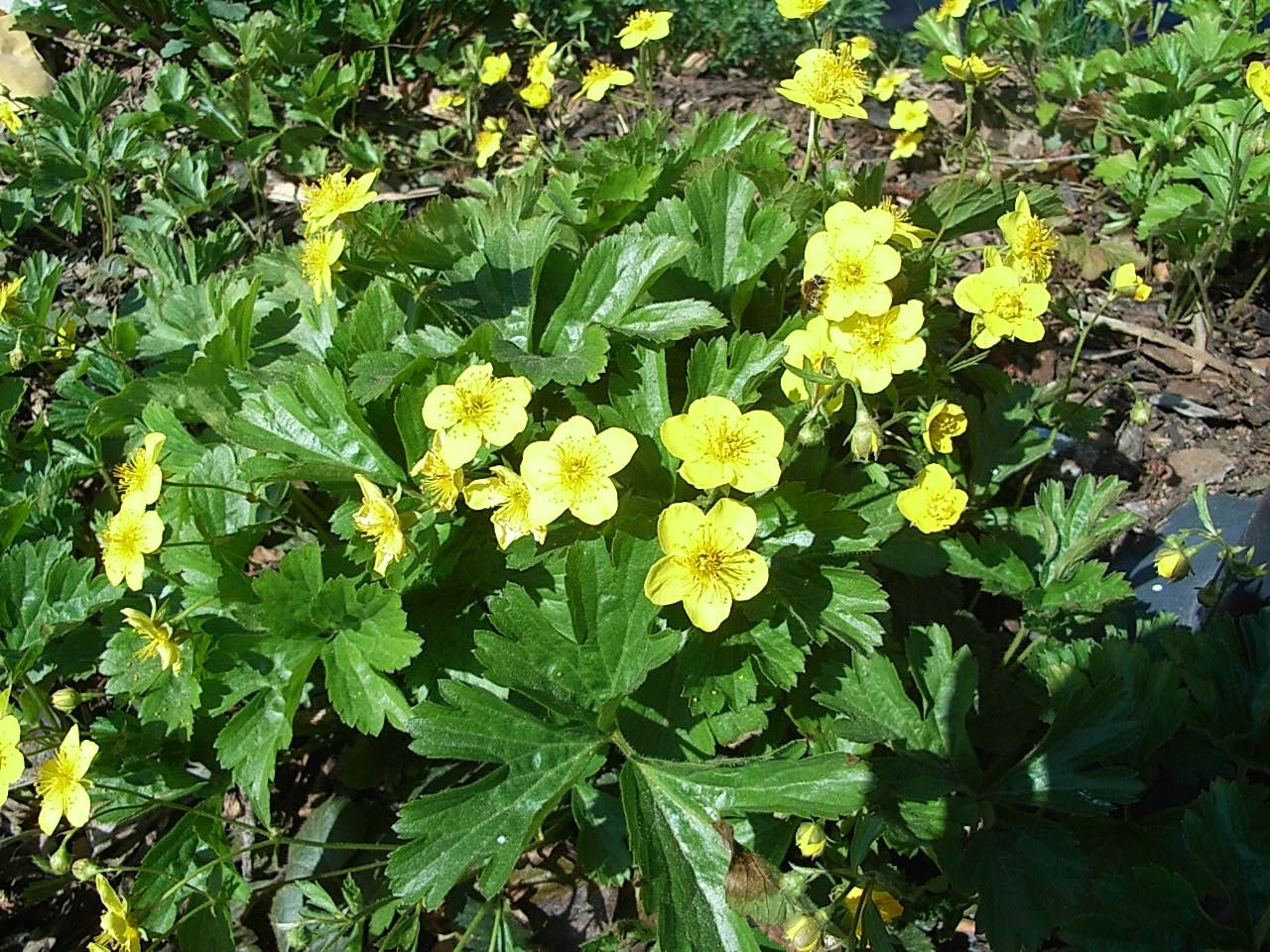
Urban groundcover in parking lot.

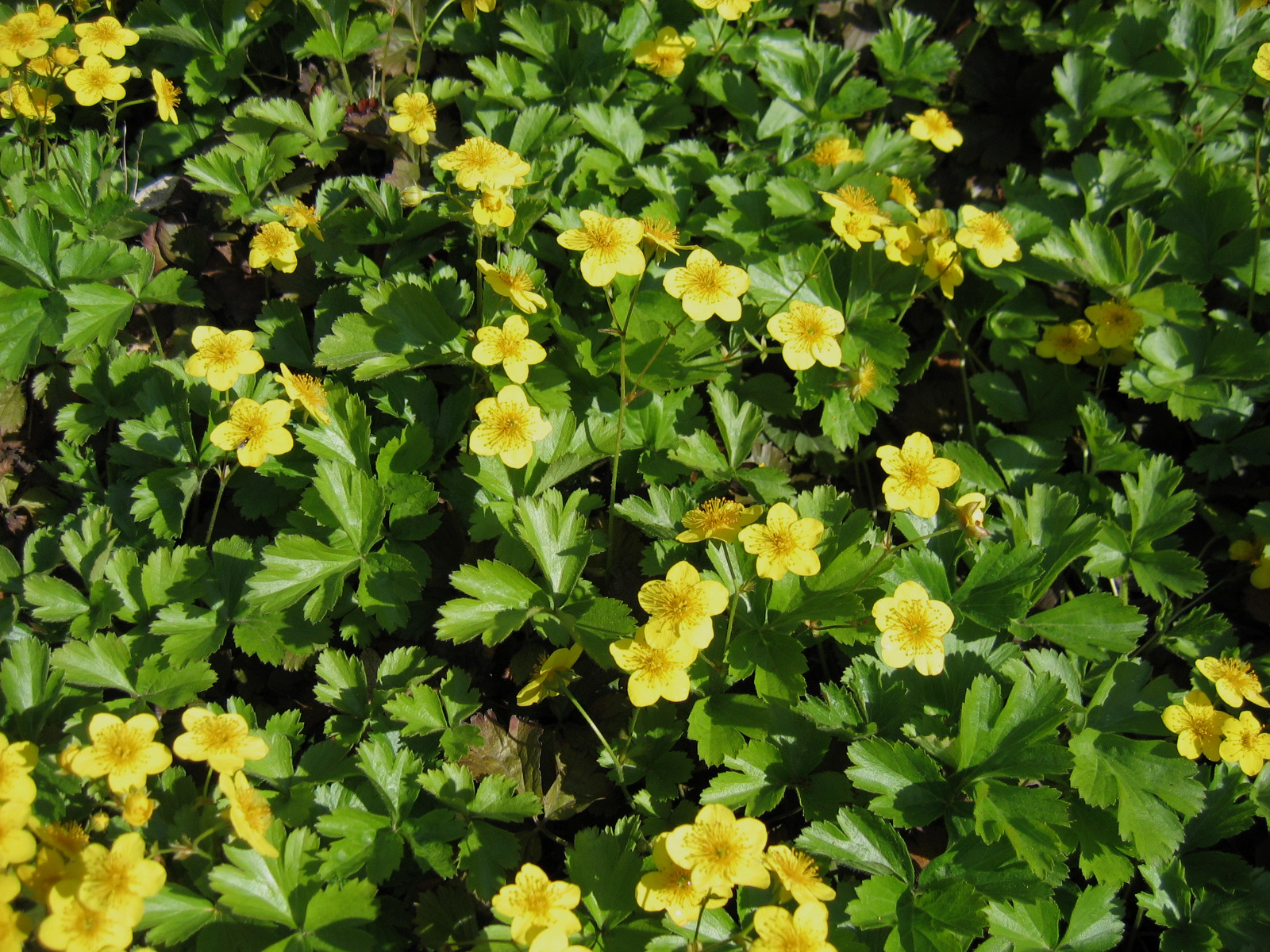
Macro shot of a flower.

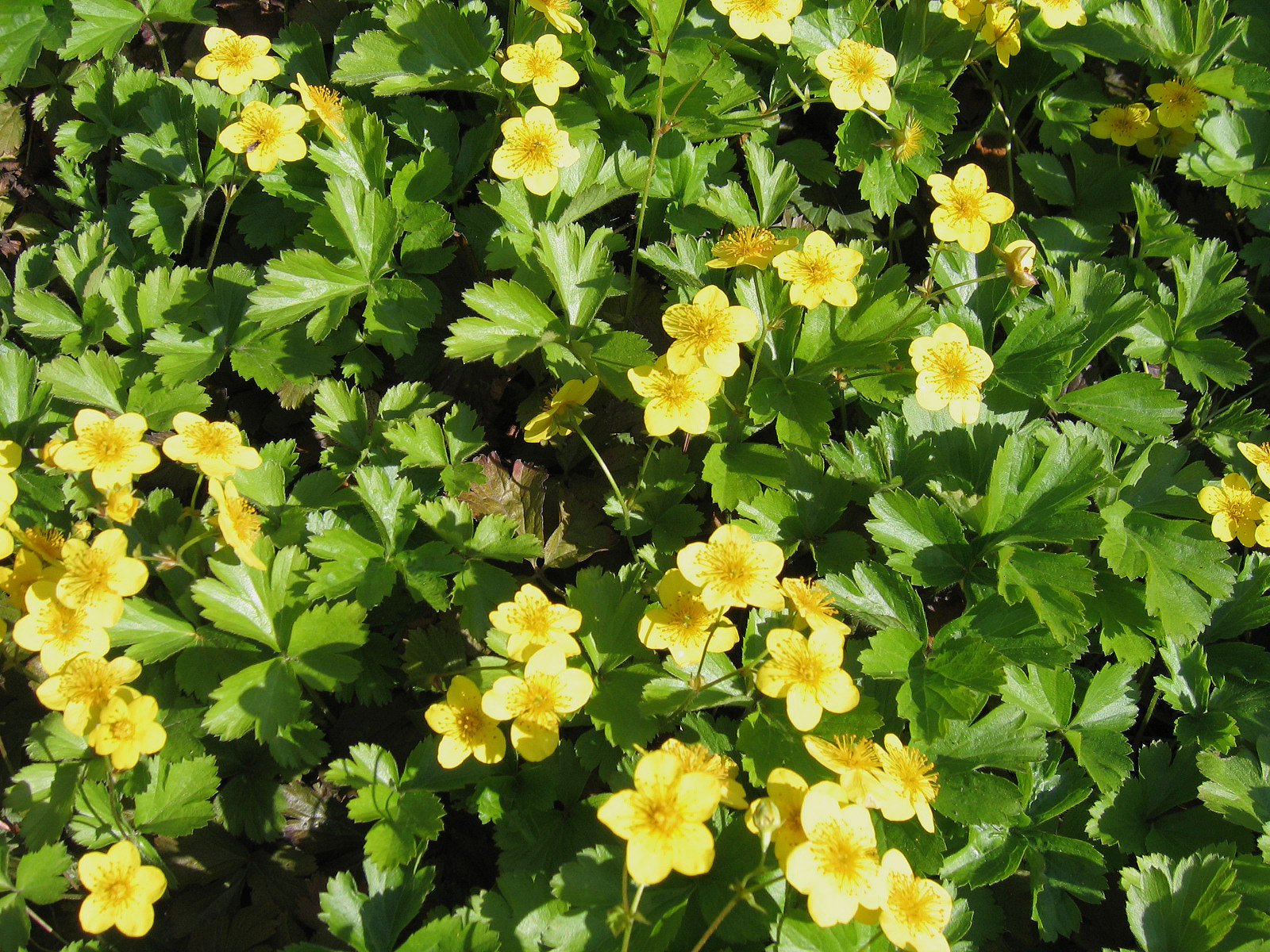

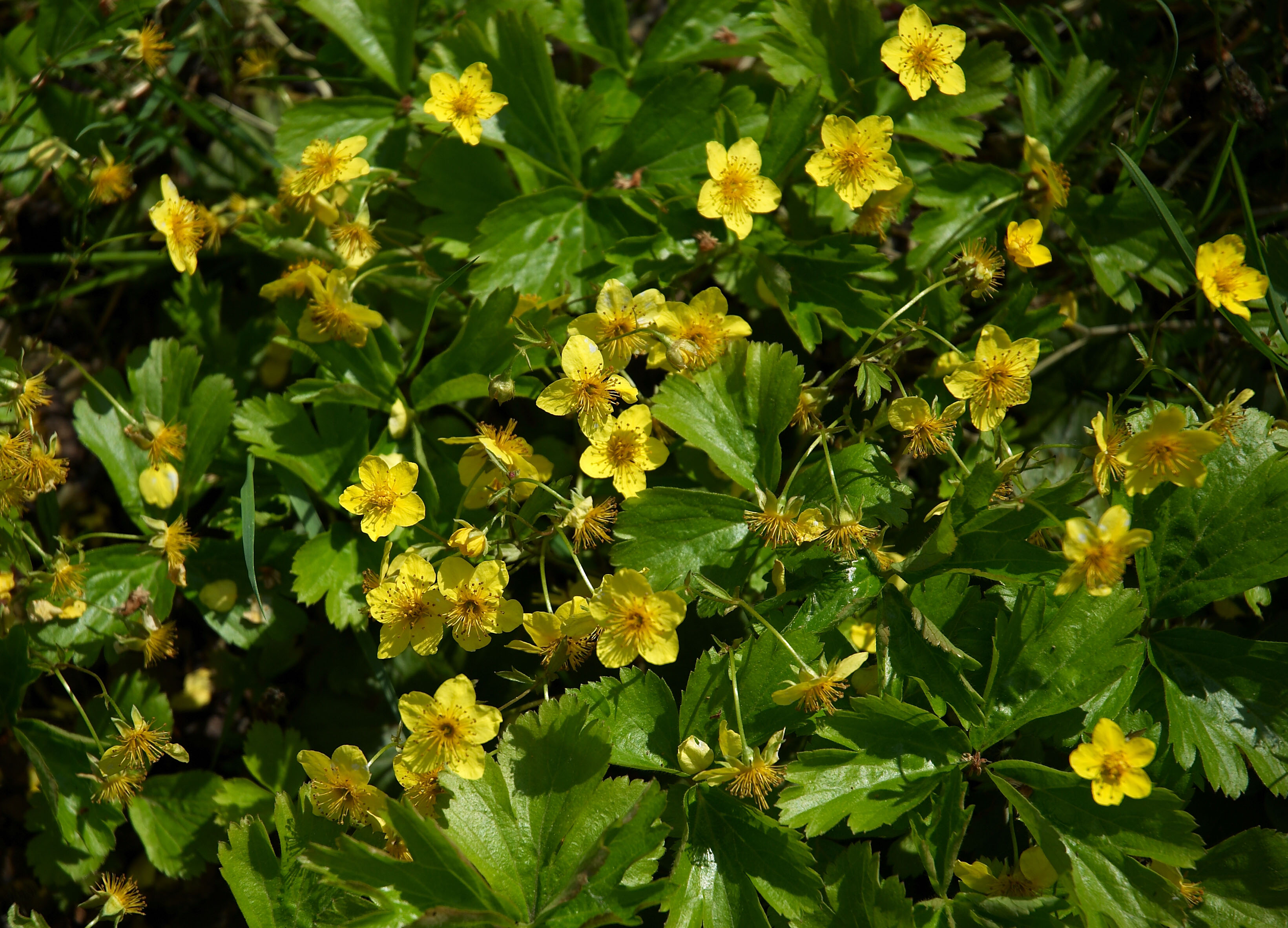
Lush vegetative mound.

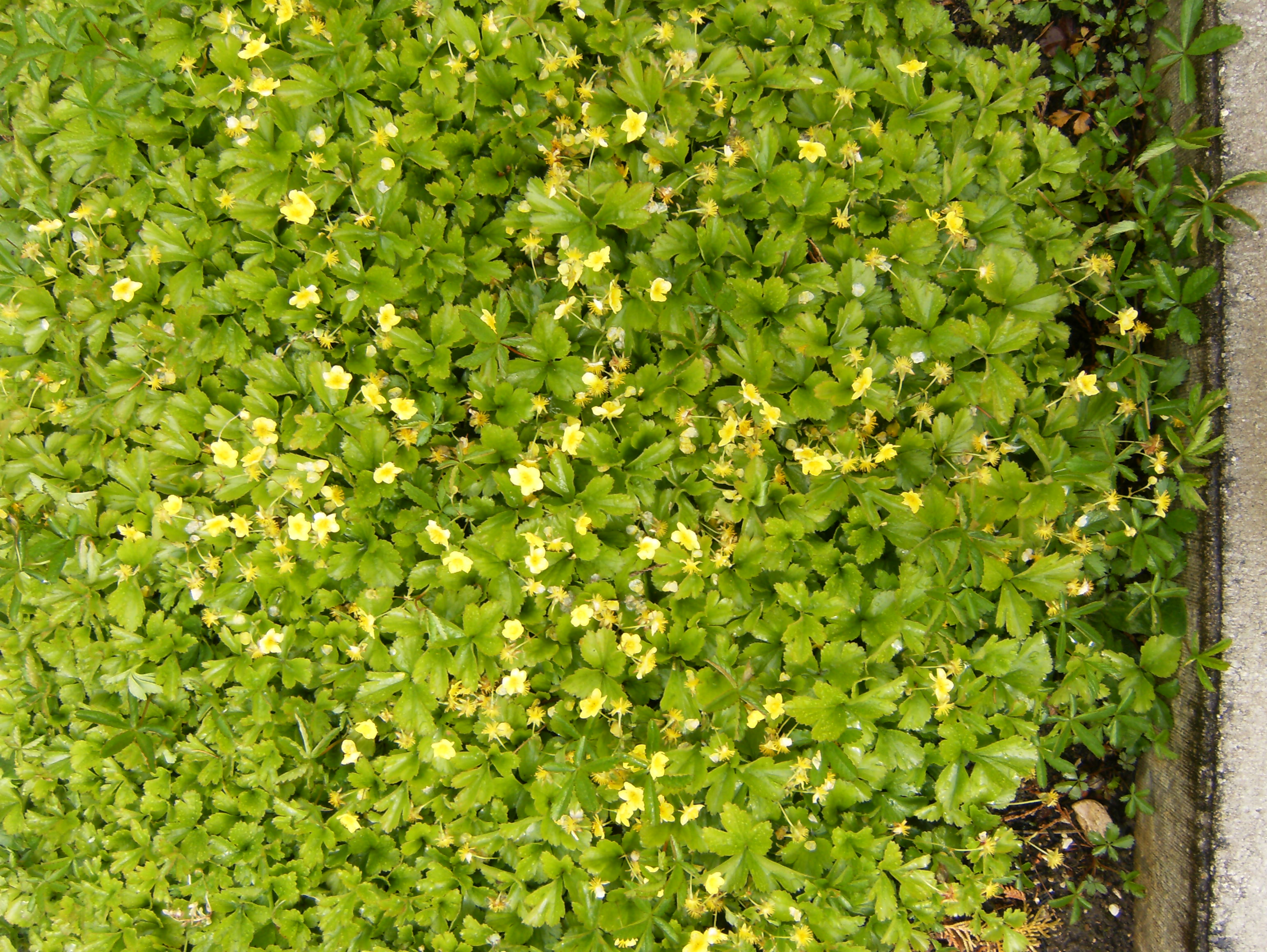
Top-down detail of leaflets.

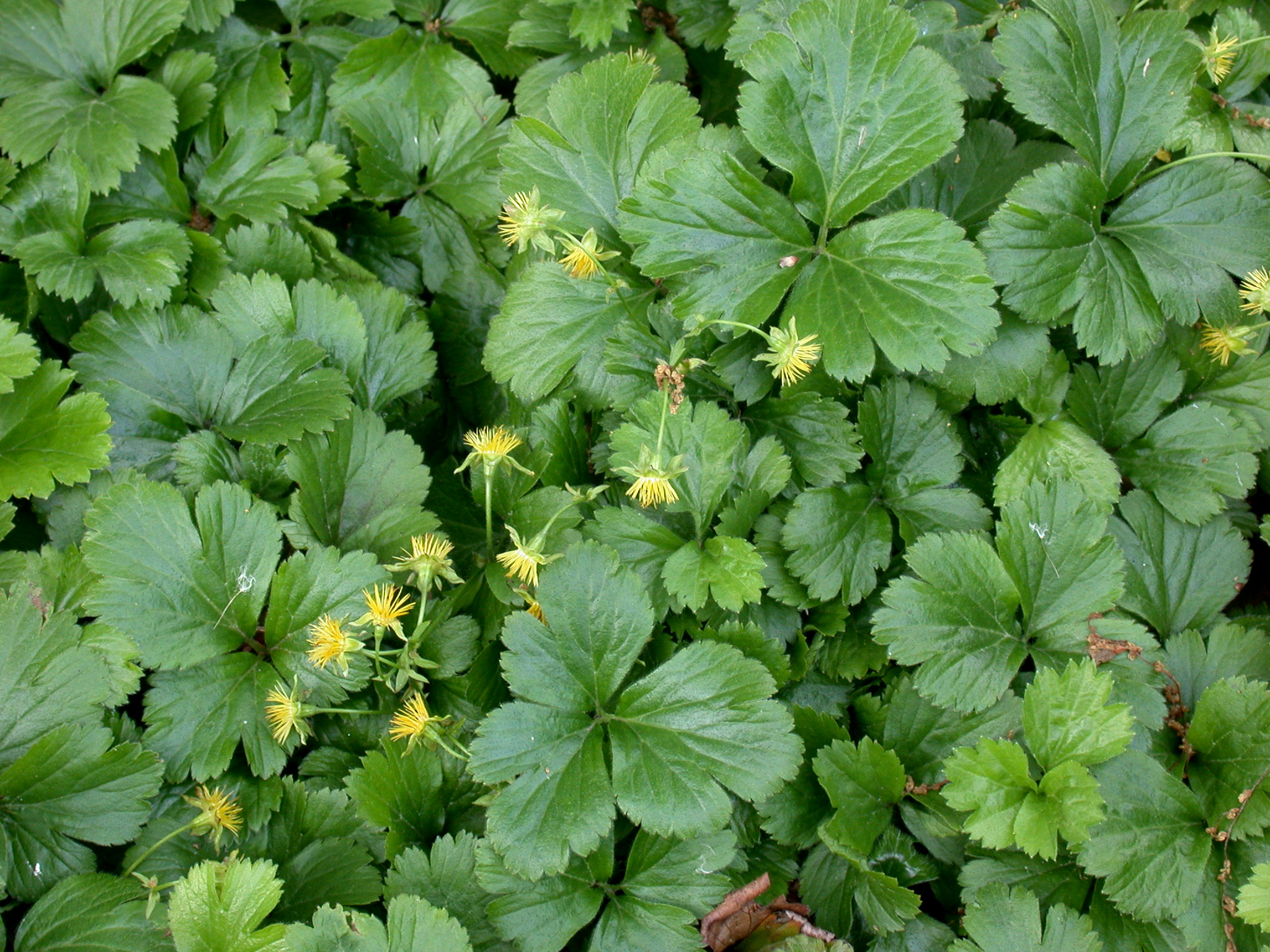

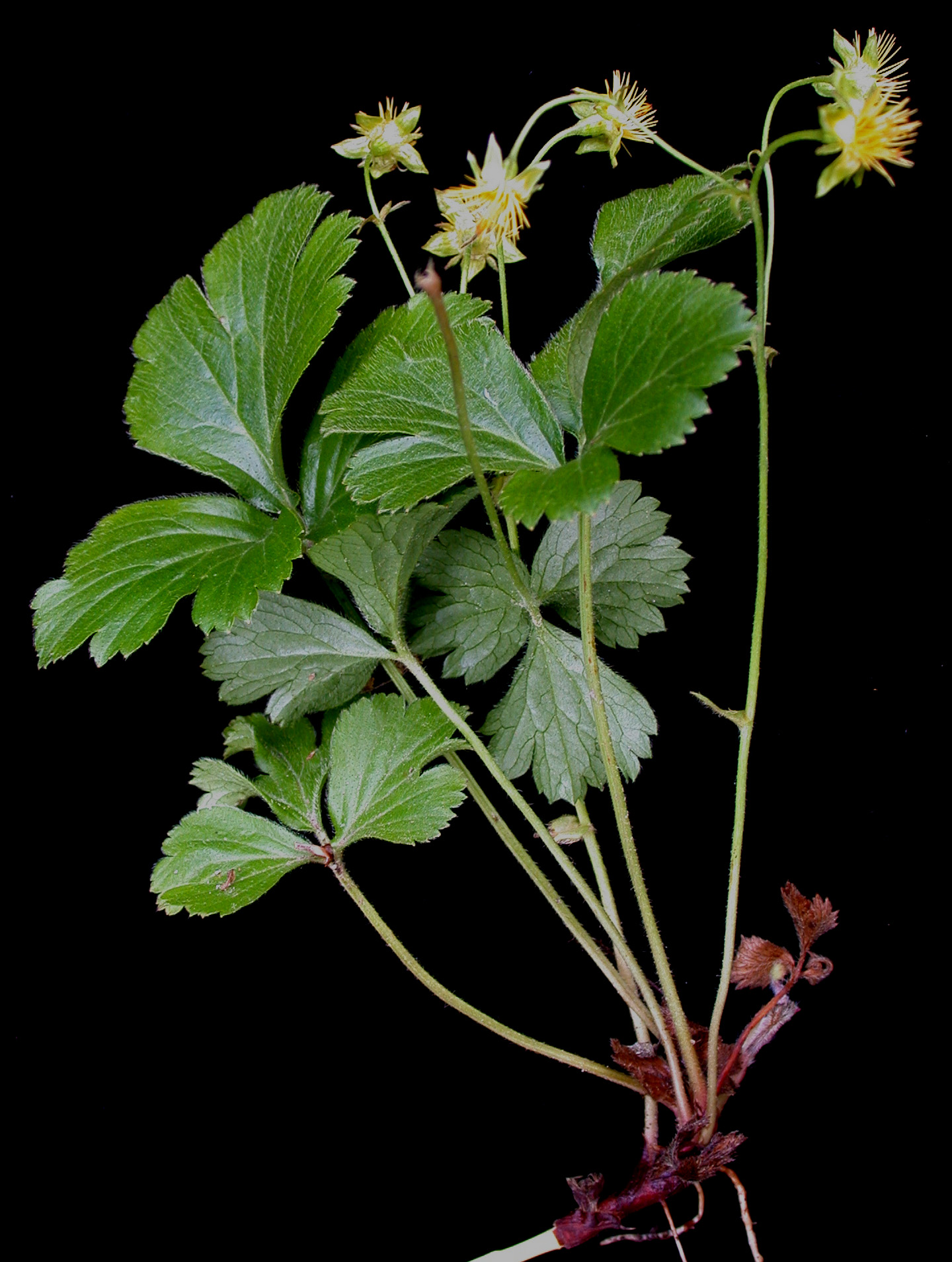

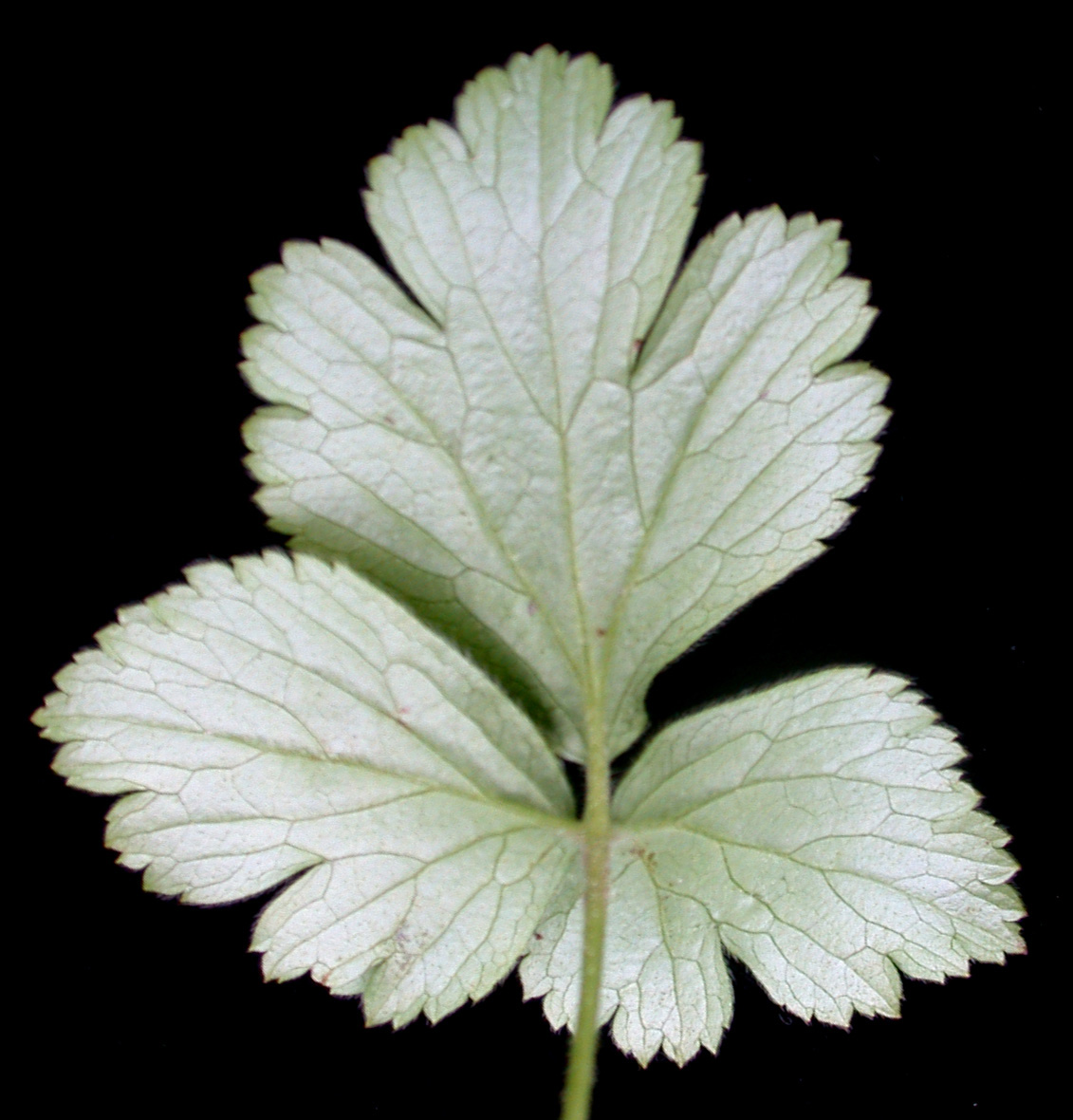
Leaf architecture of the Eurasian species.

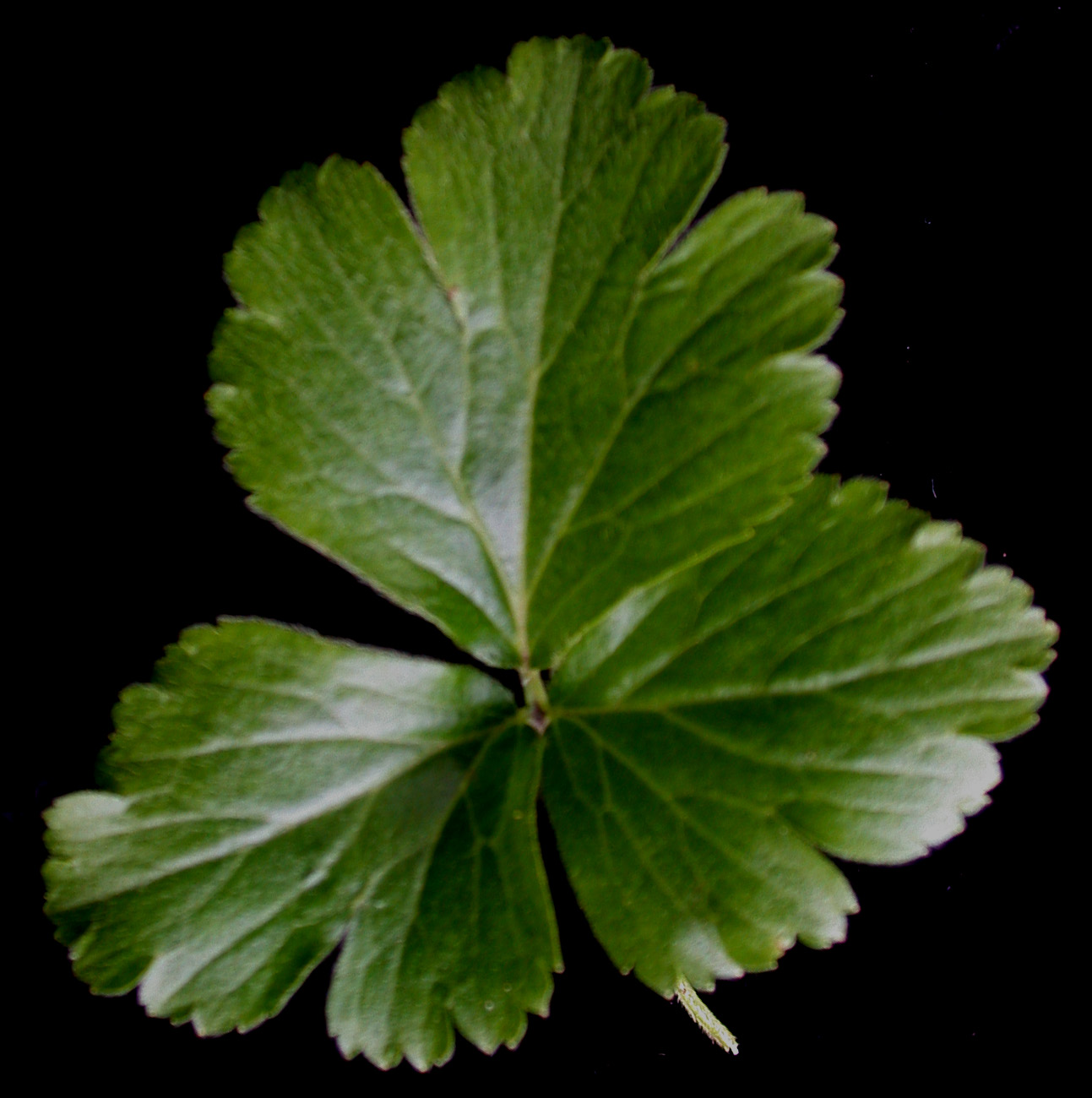

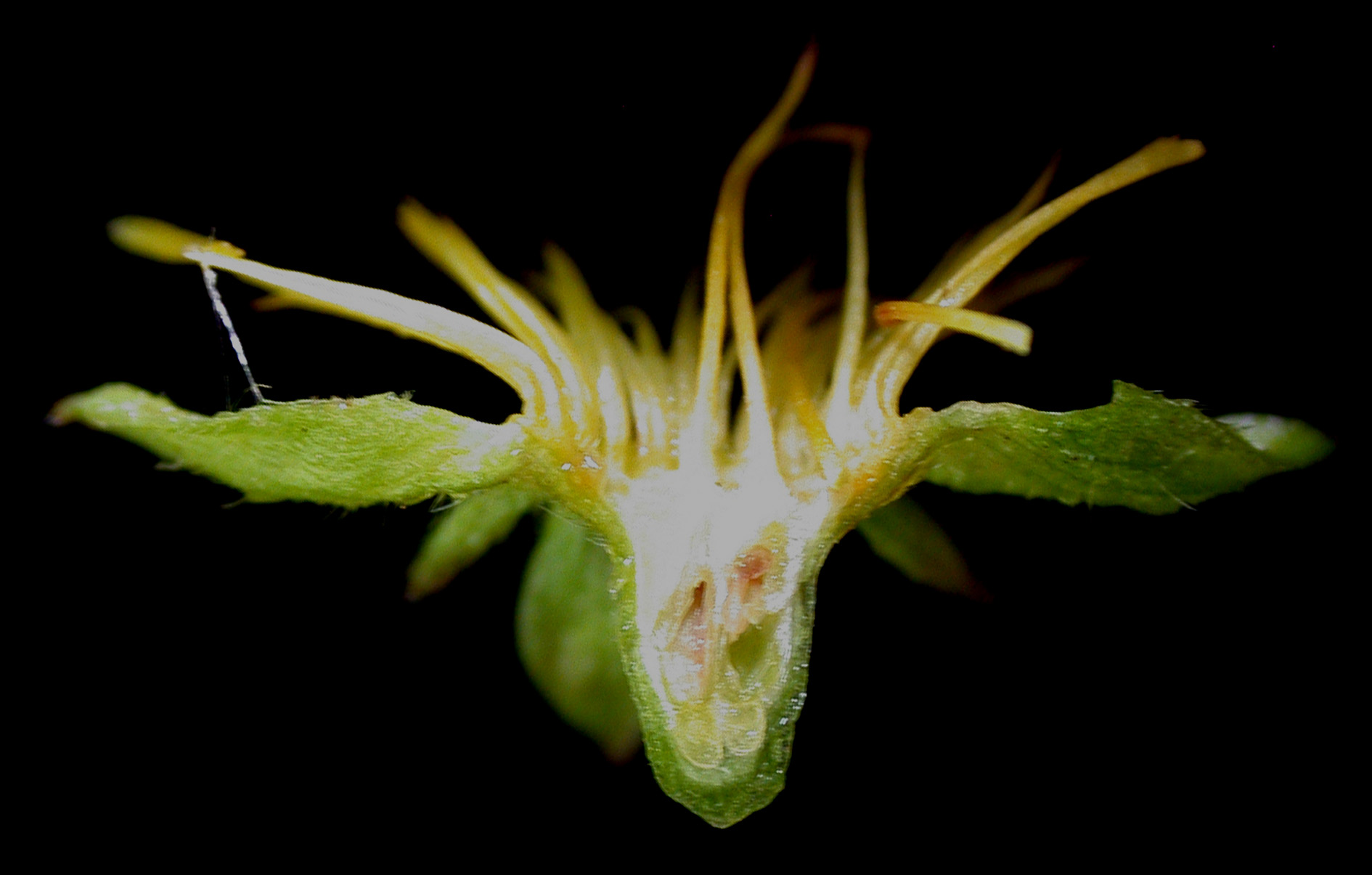

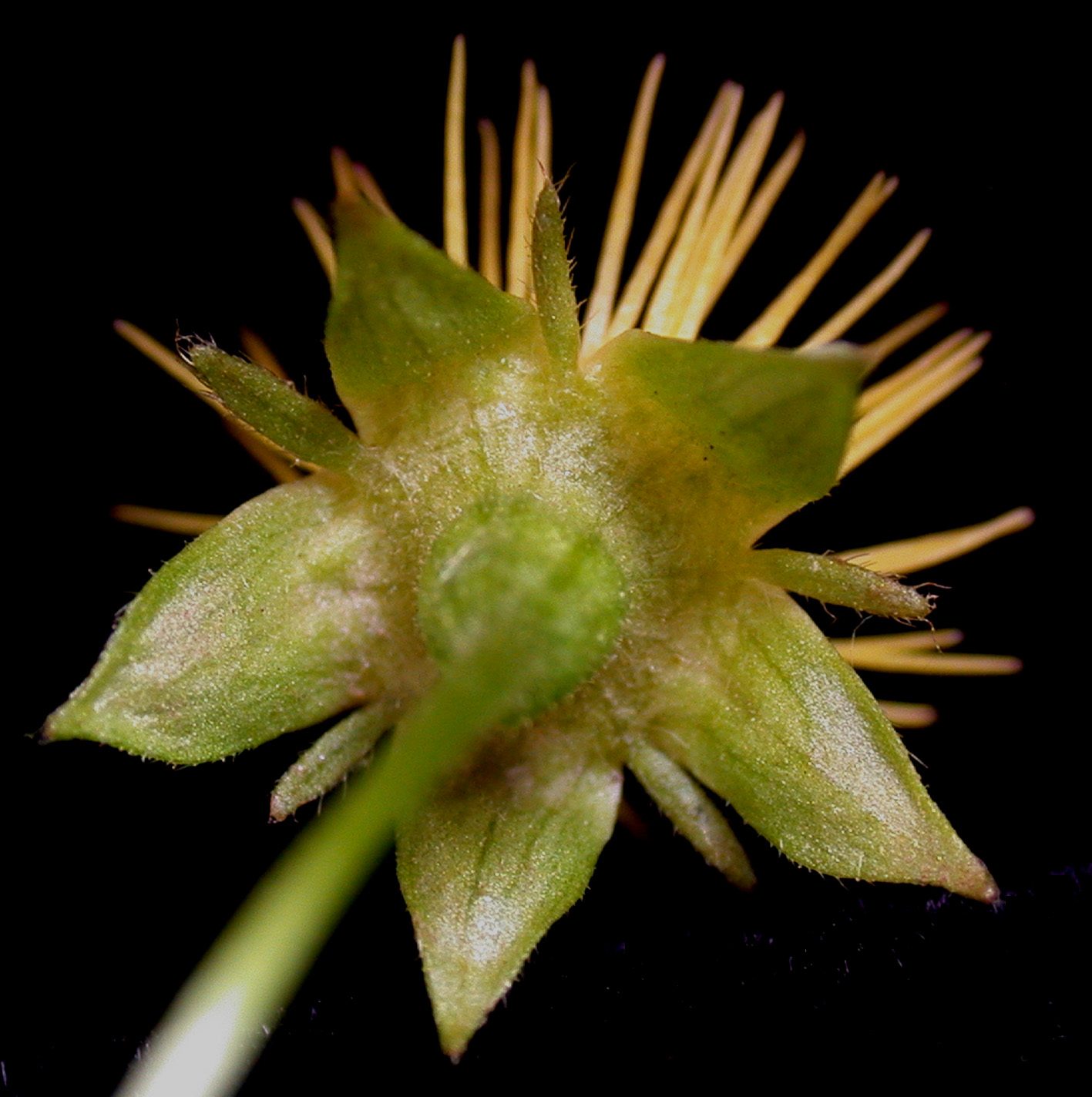
A view of the epicalyx composed of five narrow secondary mini bractlets between the five main sepals.

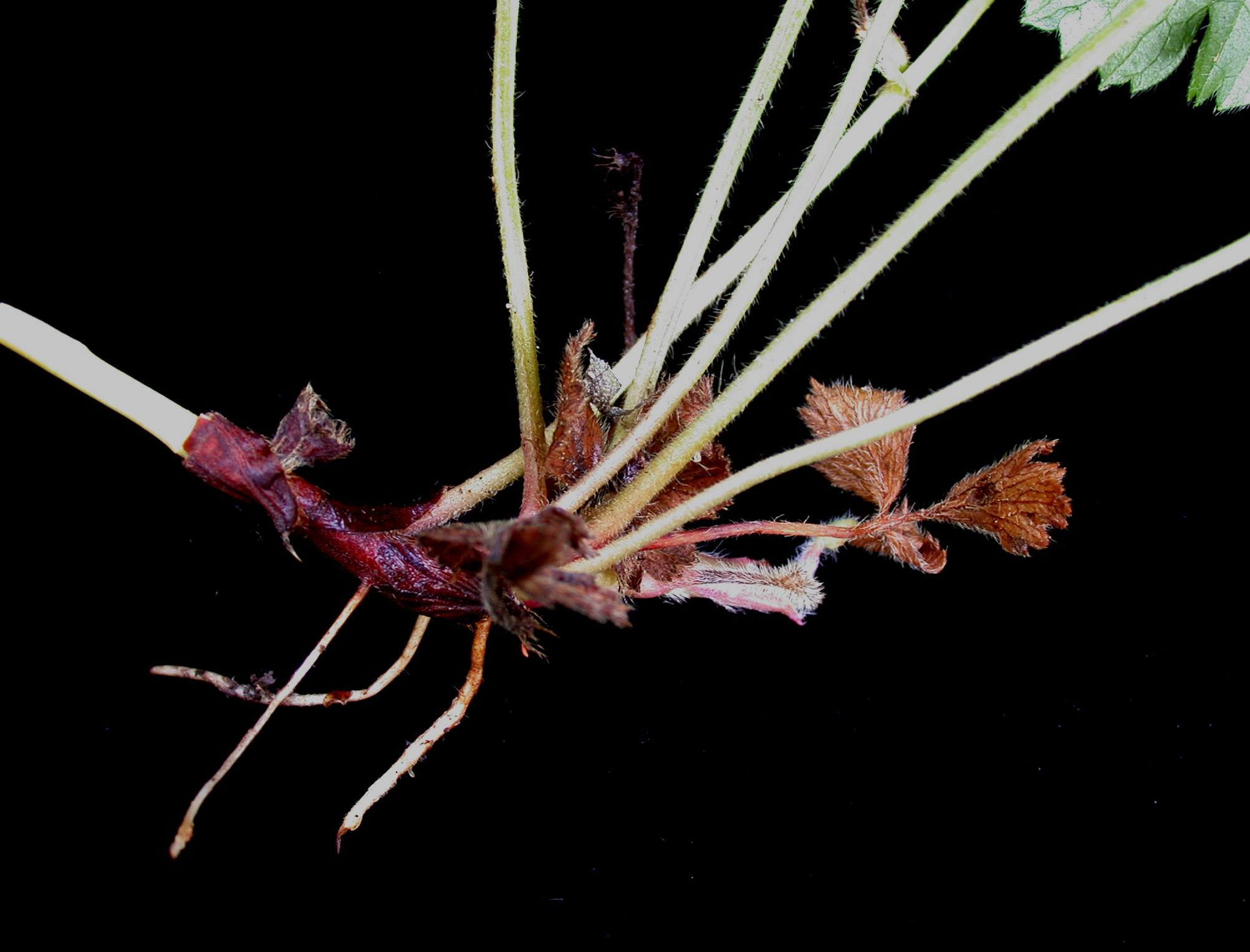
Shoot layout displaying divisions.
