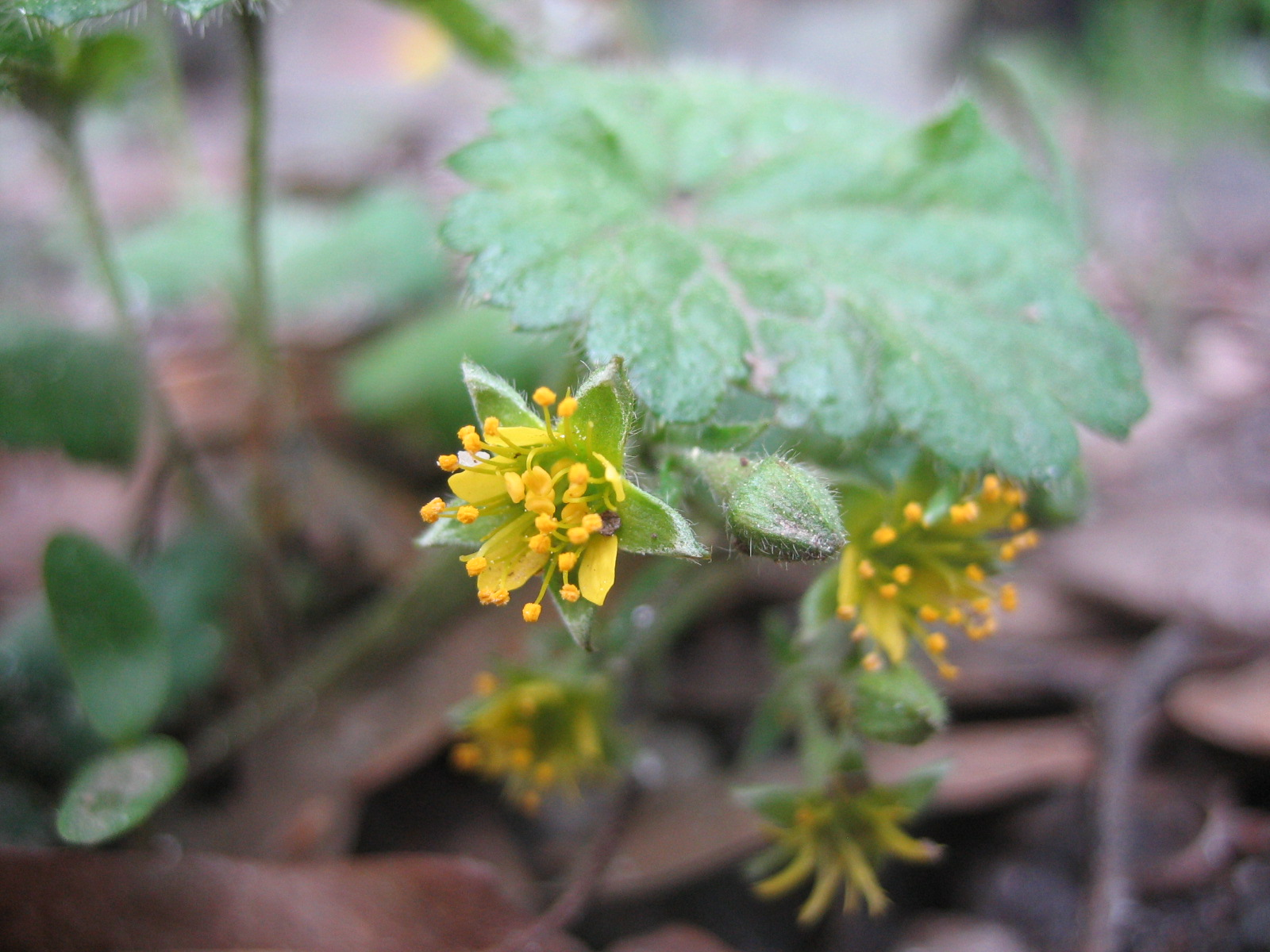

Scientific classification
- Kingdom: Plantae
- Clade: Tracheophytes
- Clade: Angiosperms
- Clade: Eudicots
- Clade: Rosids
- Order: Rosales
- Family: Rosaceae
- Genus: Waldsteinia
- Species: W. lobata

Binomial name
- Waldsteinia lobata (Baldwin) Torrey & Gray

= Waldsteinia lobata =

Piedmont barren strawberry

Species of flowering plant

Waldsteinia lobata, the piedmont barren strawberry, is a low-lying perennial herb with evergreen leaves that turn burgundy red in fall. The flower is yellow and the fruit is brown and dry.
