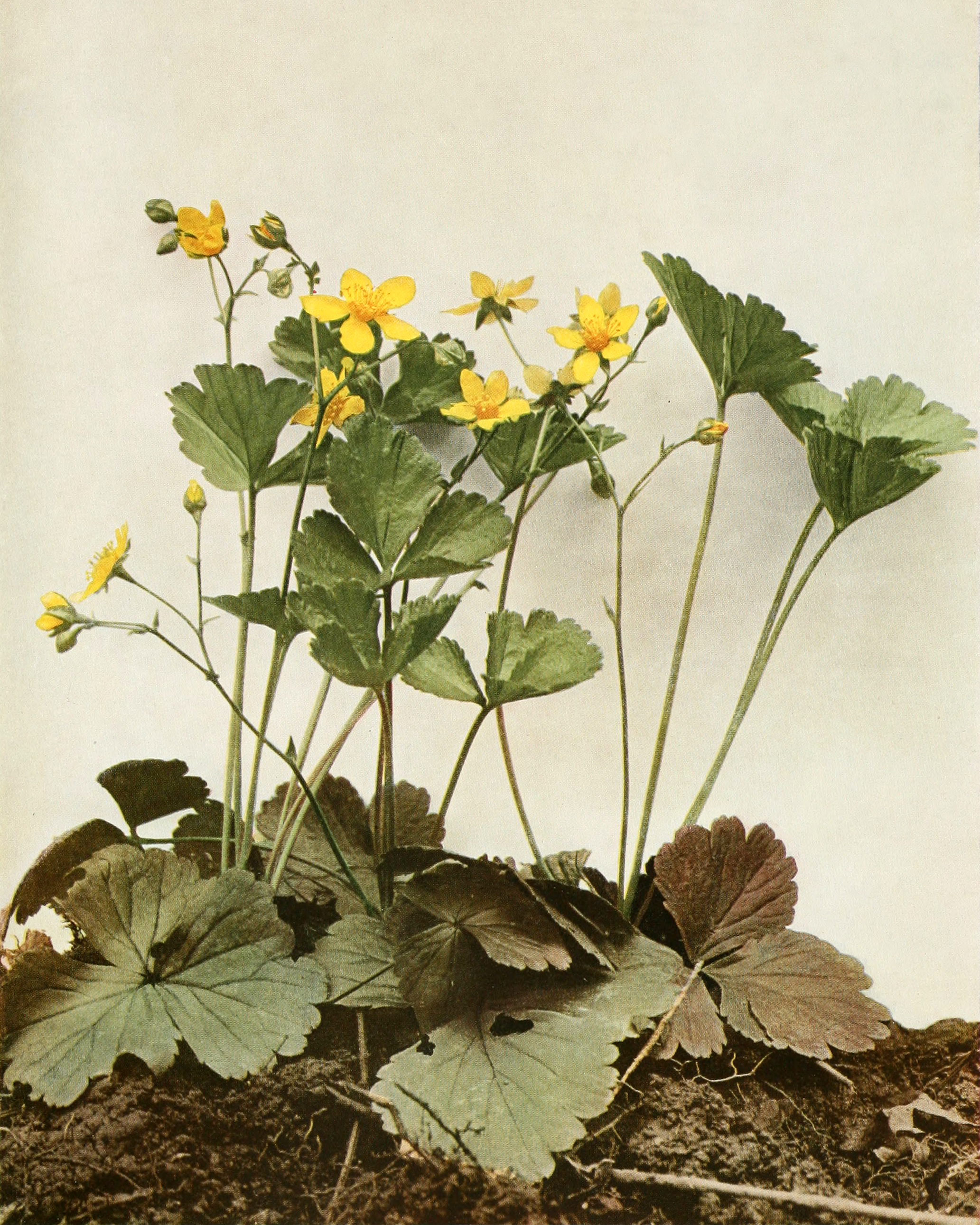
- Meticulous 1918 botanical plate showing the native plant's narrow, widely separated yellow petals and obovate leaflets with shallowly scalloped margins.

Conservation status
- Secure (NatureServe)

Scientific classification
- Kingdom: Plantae
- Clade: Tracheophytes
- Clade: Angiosperms
- Clade: Eudicots
- Clade: Rosids
- Order: Rosales
- Family: Rosaceae
- Genus: Waldsteinia
- Species: W. fragarioides

Binomial name
- Waldsteinia fragarioides (Michx.) Tratt.

Synonyms
- Geum fragarioides; Appalachian barren strawberry; barren strawberry; Northern barren strawberry; Bossekia fragarioides; Comaropsis fragarioides; Rubus fragarioides Michx. Dum.Cours.; Dalibarda fragarioides Michx.

= Waldsteinia fragarioides =

Species of North American flowering plant in the rose family

Waldsteinia fragarioides is a low, spreading perennial groundcover native to eastern North America. It produces yellow five petaled flowers that appear in early spring and is frequently used as an evergreen underplanting in perennial gardens. It lacks above ground runners entirely, spreading strictly via slow moving, subterranean rhizomes creeping just beneath the soil surface.

== Conservation status in the United States ==
Waldsteinia fragarioides is found from Minnesota, Ontario, Quebec, and Maine south to Indiana and Pennsylvania (and as far south as North Carolina in the mountains). It is listed as endangered in Connecticut, Illinois, and Maine, as threatened in New Hampshire, as a special concern in Massachusetts, and as rare in Indiana.

== Native American ethnobotany ==
The Haudenosaunee take a compound decoction of the Waldsteinia fragarioides as a blood remedy, and apply a poultice of the smashed plants to snakebites.

== Lookalike species and nursery trade confusion ==
Waldsteinia fragarioides is similar in appearance to other low plants of the rose family such as Fragaria (strawberries) or Potentilla indica (Indian strawberry). In North America, this plant is a common misnomer of Waldsteinia ternata (Siberian barren strawberry), frequently mislabeled and sold in its place, even though this native species lacks runners and has more rounded leaves. Waldsteinia ternata is much easier for commercial growers to rapidly propagate via division of their rooted runners, which is a major reason why it accidentally flooded the North American nursery trade. Because the two species share nearly identical three lobed semi evergreen foliage, and yellow five petaled flowers, they are easily misidentified without close inspection of the floral anatomy and leaf margins.

== Taxonomy and identification ==
Waldsteinia fragarioides and Waldsteinia ternata can be definitively distinguished by key morphological traits:

- Petal Structure: Distance between, and shape of, the five petals of the yellow flower blossoms.
- Calyx Anatomy: The green backing (calyx) on the underside of the flower.
- Foliage Morphology: The features of the leaflet edges at the tips.
- Growth and Propagation: The method by which the plant sends out new shoots.

The two species can be reliably differentiated using the following morphological keys:

Feature	Waldsteinia fragarioides (Appalachian barren strawberry)	Waldsteinia ternata (Siberian barren strawberry)
Origin	Native to Eastern North America.	Native to Eurasia (Siberia, East Asia, and parts of Central Europe).
Flower Petals	Slender, narrow, and widely spaced, with distinct, open green gaps between them. W. fragarioides flower	Broad and rounded; petals often touch or overlap. W. ternata flower
Calyx Structure	Lacks an epicalyx. It possesses only five smooth primary sepals. W. fragarioides with only the five primary sepals	Prominent epicalyx present, featuring an additional five narrow secondary mini bractlets between each of the five primary sepals. W. ternata with more than just five primary sepals
Leaf Margins	Shallowly rounded, and crenate. W. fragarioides leaf	Jagged, and sharply serrated. W. ternata leaf
Spread & Growth	Spreads slowly only via underground rhizomes; lacks above ground surface runners.	Roots grow at nodes along creeping above ground stolons. Also produces short rhizomes.

== Images ==

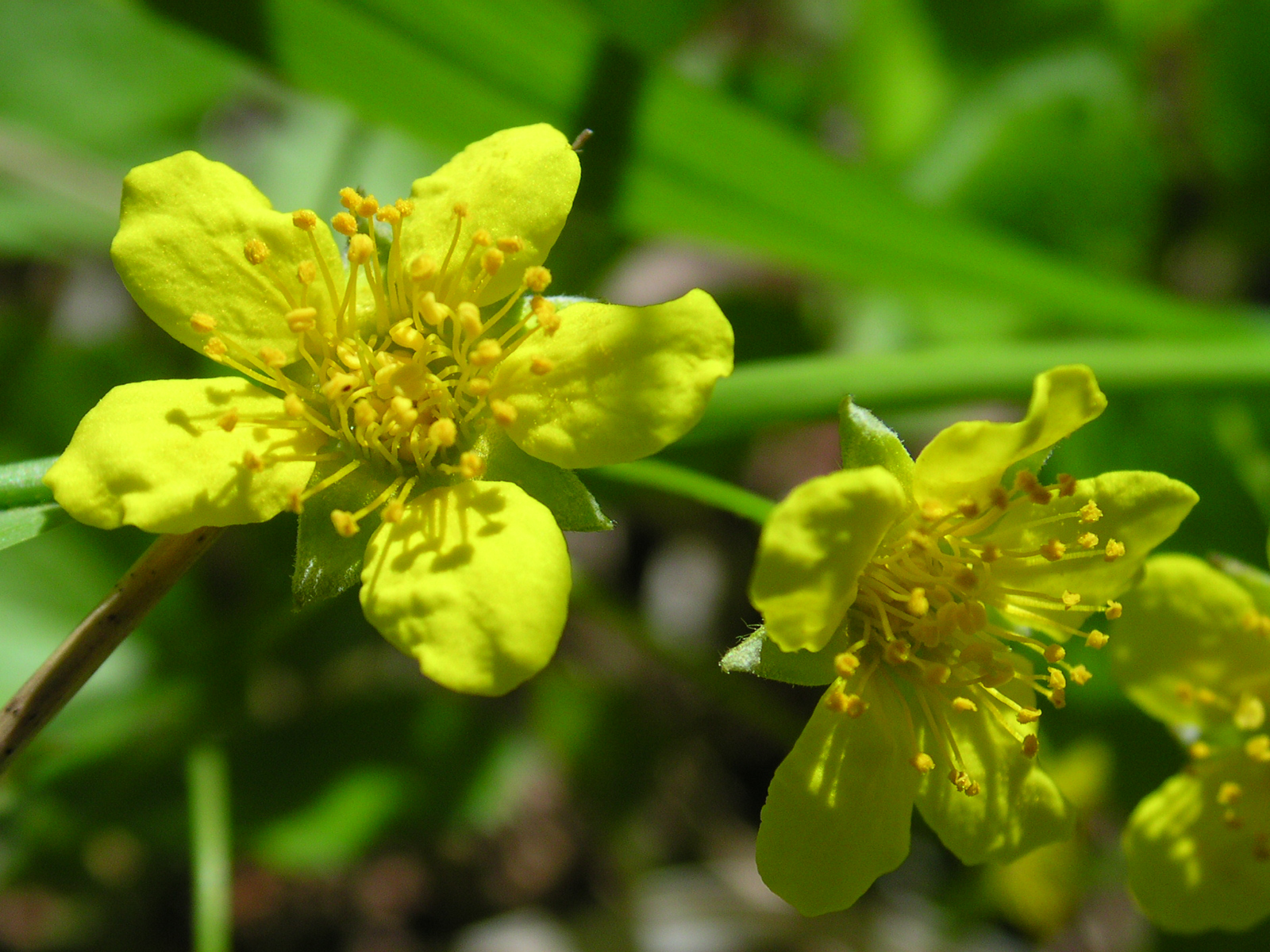

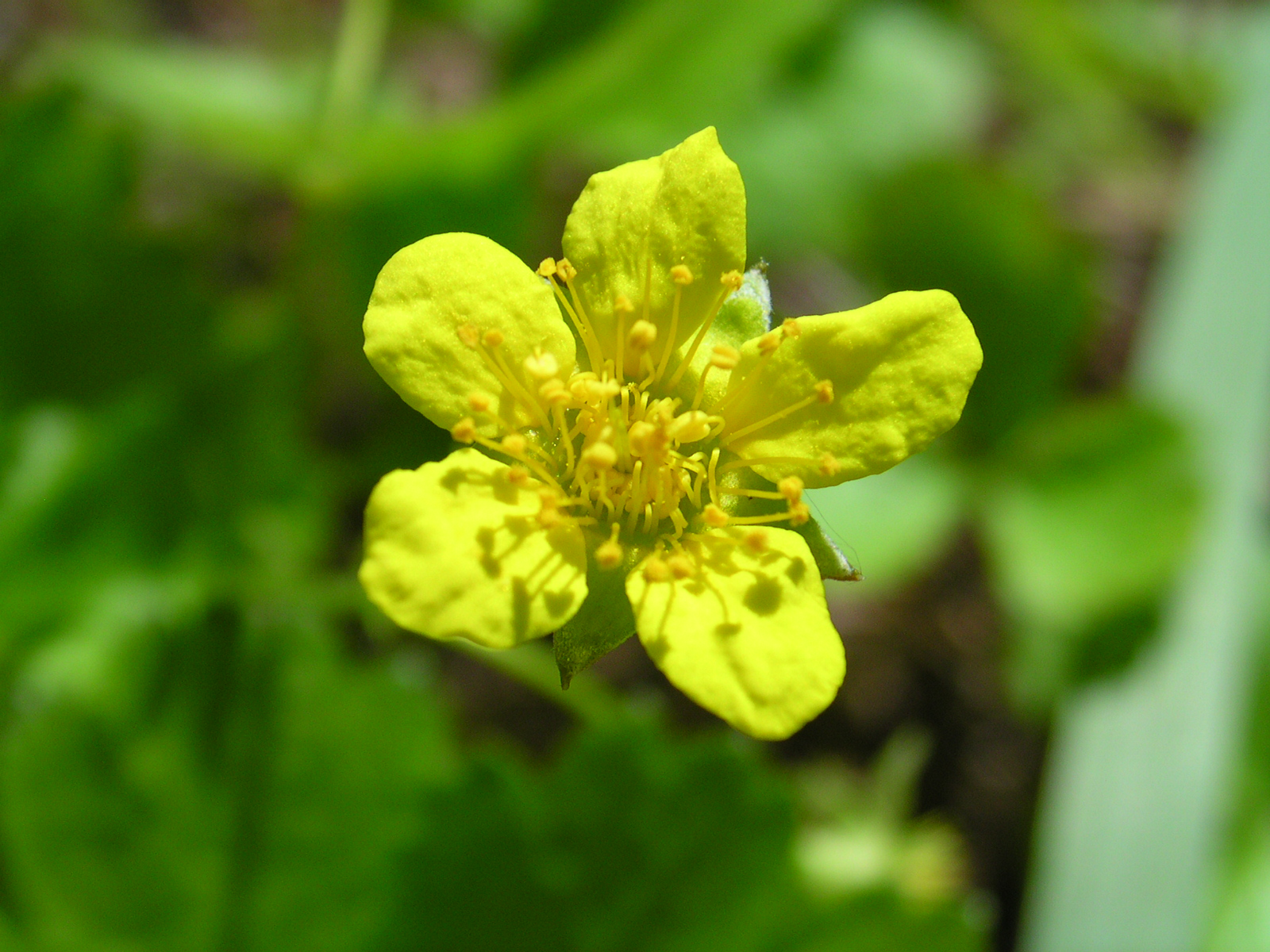

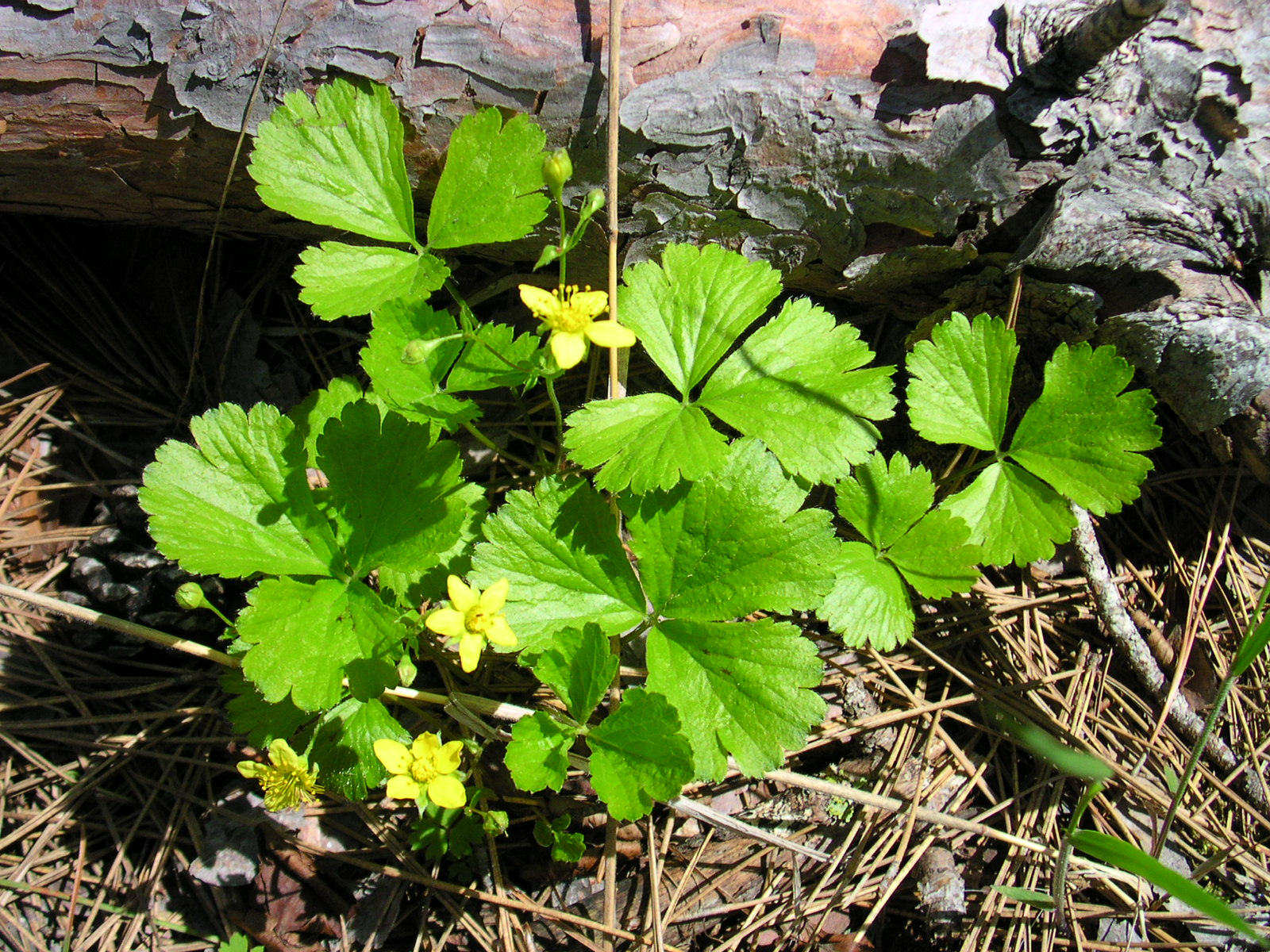

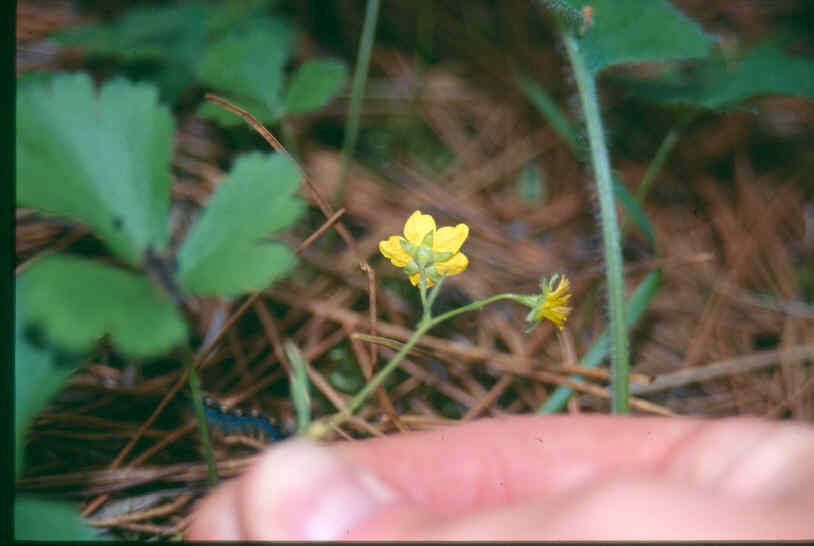

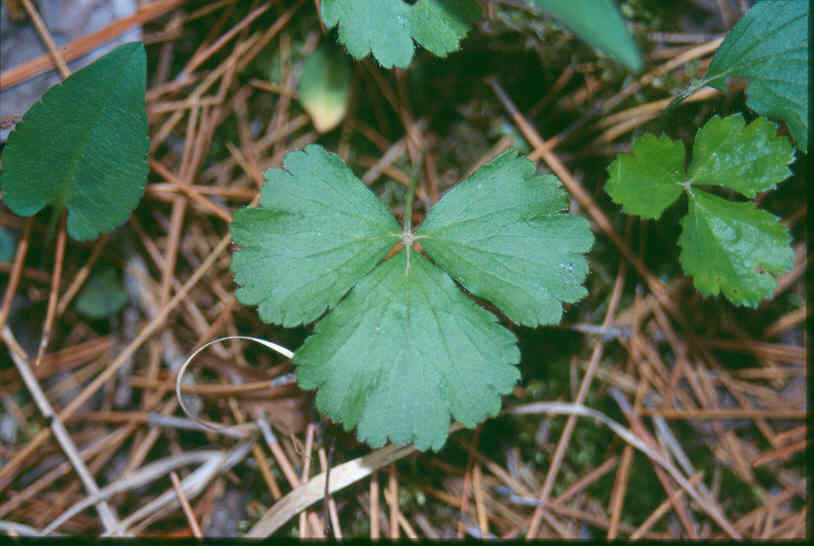

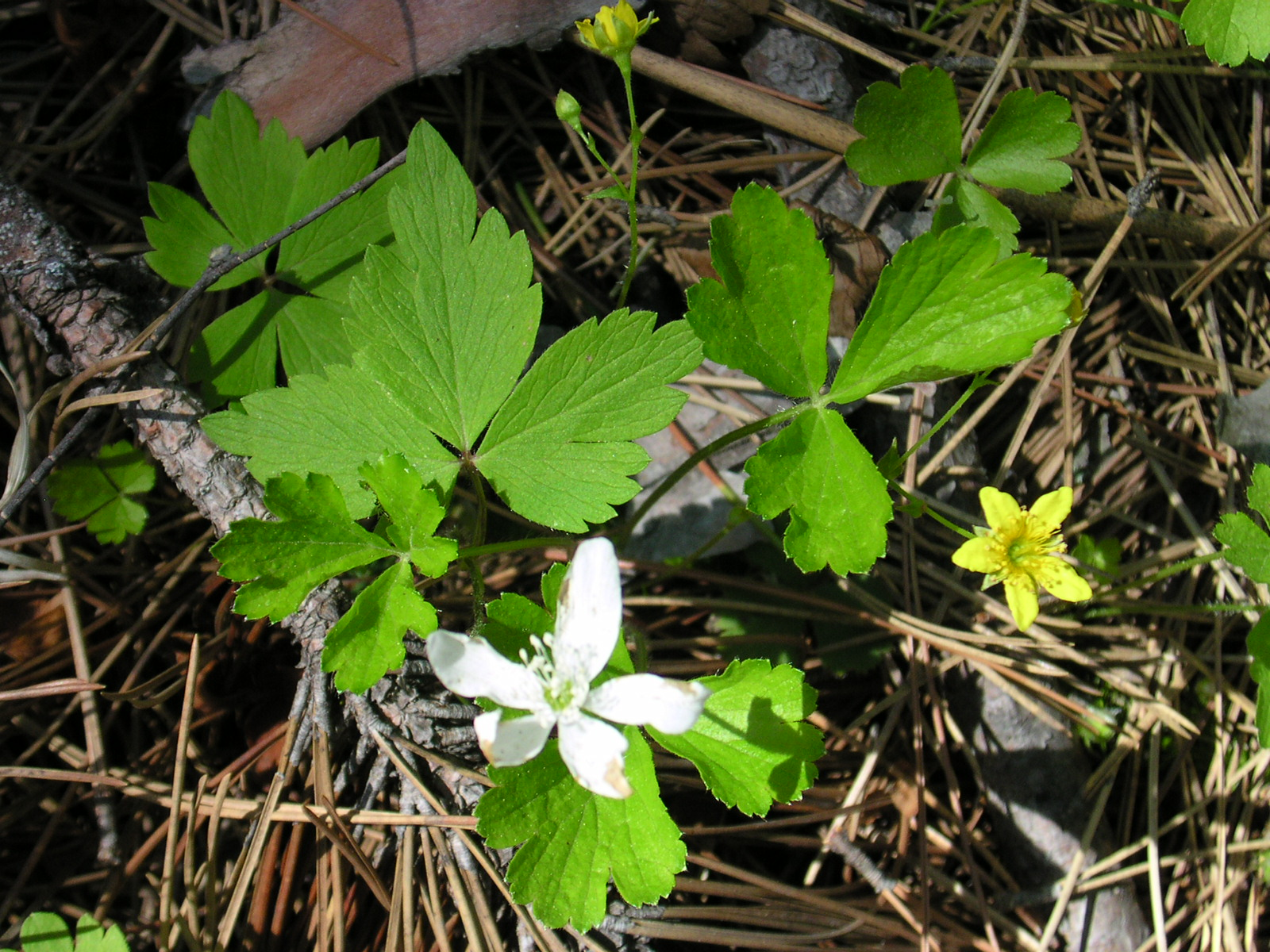
Waldsteinia fragarioides growing alongside Anemone

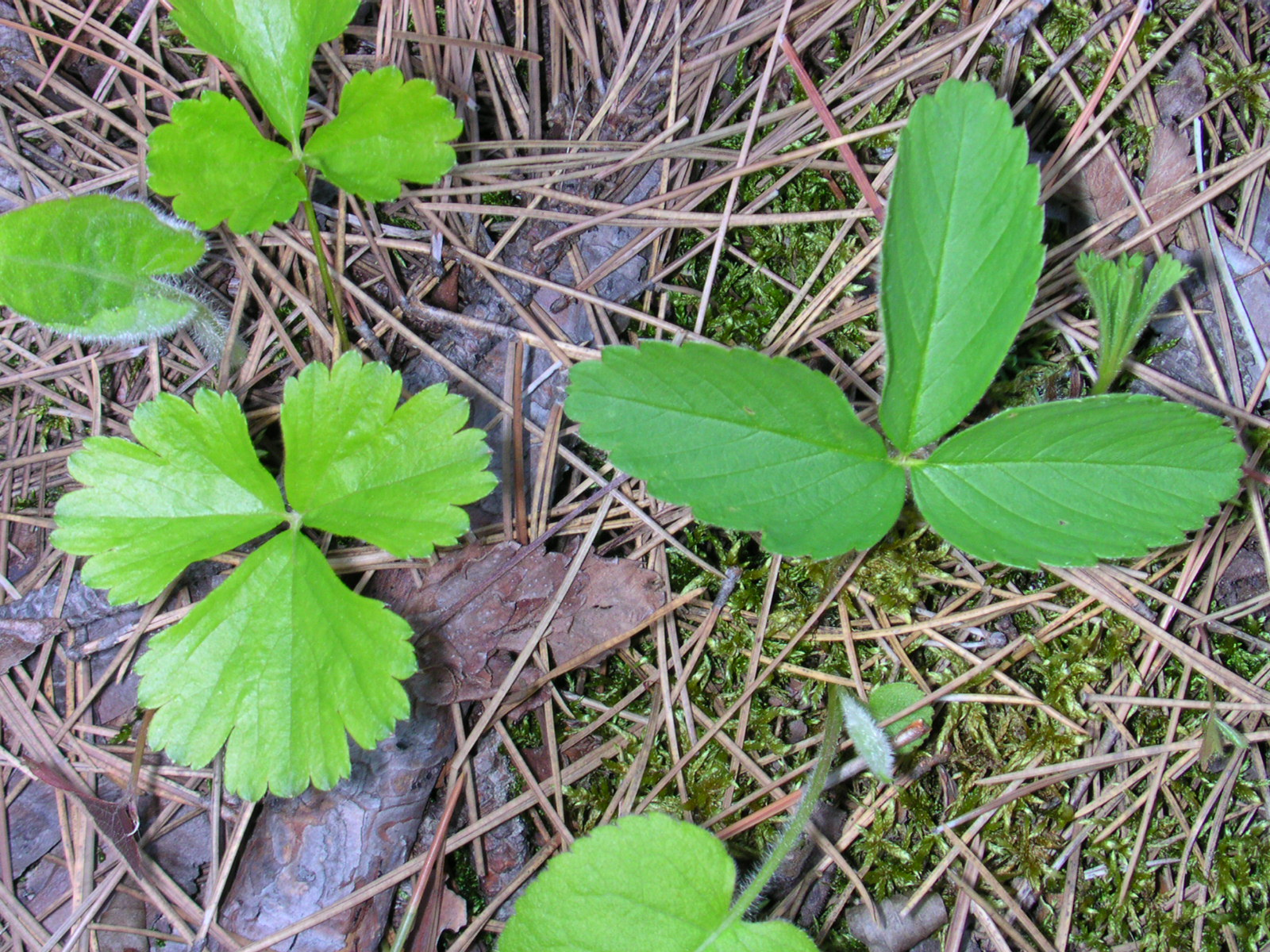
Waldsteinia fragarioides (left) next to Fragaria (right)

Illustration from André Michaux's 1803 "Flora Boreali-Americana"

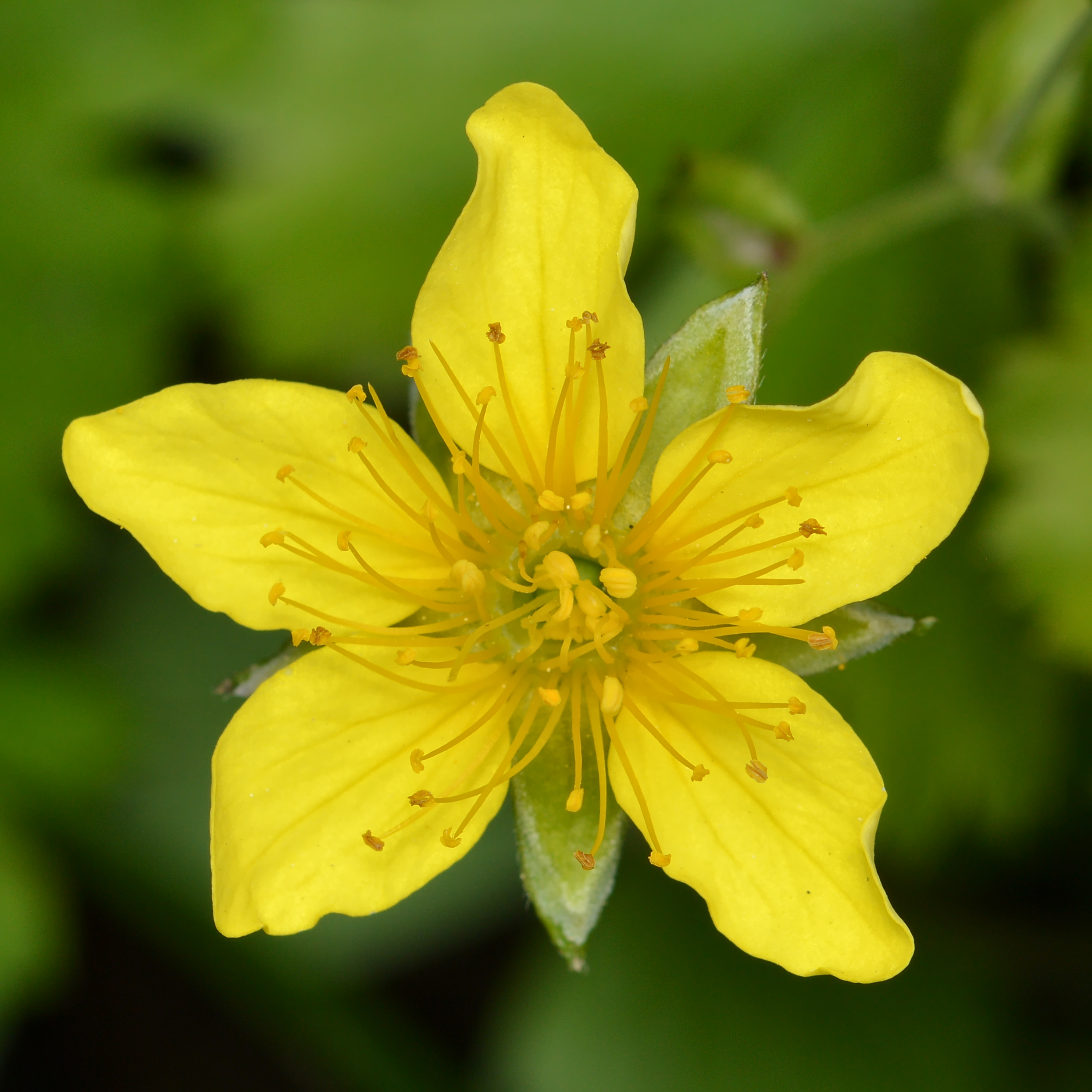

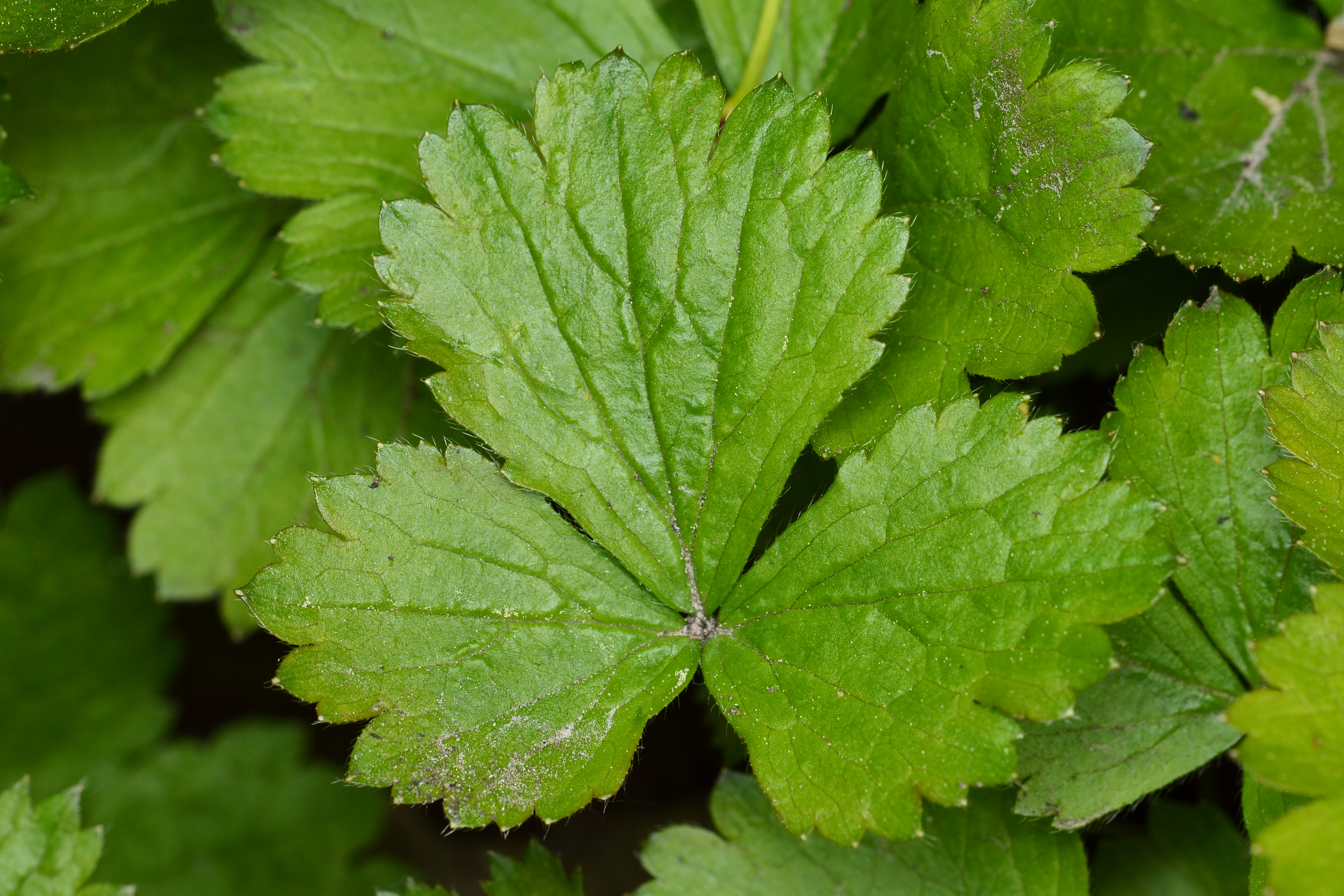
