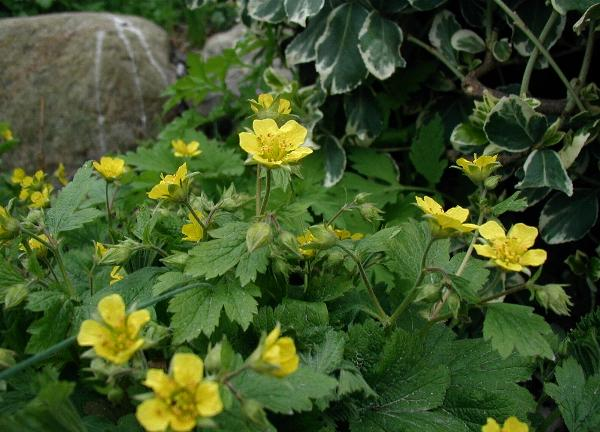
- Waldsteinia geoides

Scientific classification
- Kingdom: Plantae
- Clade: Tracheophytes
- Clade: Angiosperms
- Clade: Eudicots
- Clade: Rosids
- Order: Rosales
- Family: Rosaceae
- Subfamily: Rosoideae
- Tribe: Colurieae
- Genus: Waldsteinia; Willd.

Species
- Waldsteinia fragarioides - barren strawberry Waldsteinia geoides Waldsteinia idahoensis - Idaho strawberry Waldsteinia lobata - Piedmont barren strawberry Waldsteinia ternata et al.

= Waldsteinia =

Genus of flowering plants

Waldsteinia, the barren strawberries, is a genus of the rose family (Rosaceae). It contains about six species native to the temperate Northern Hemisphere. A number of species are cultivated as a ground cover in gardens, including Waldsteinia fragarioides from North America, Waldsteinia geoides from Europe, Waldsteinia lobata, and Waldsteinia ternata from Eurasia (from Central Europe to Siberia, China, and Japan).
