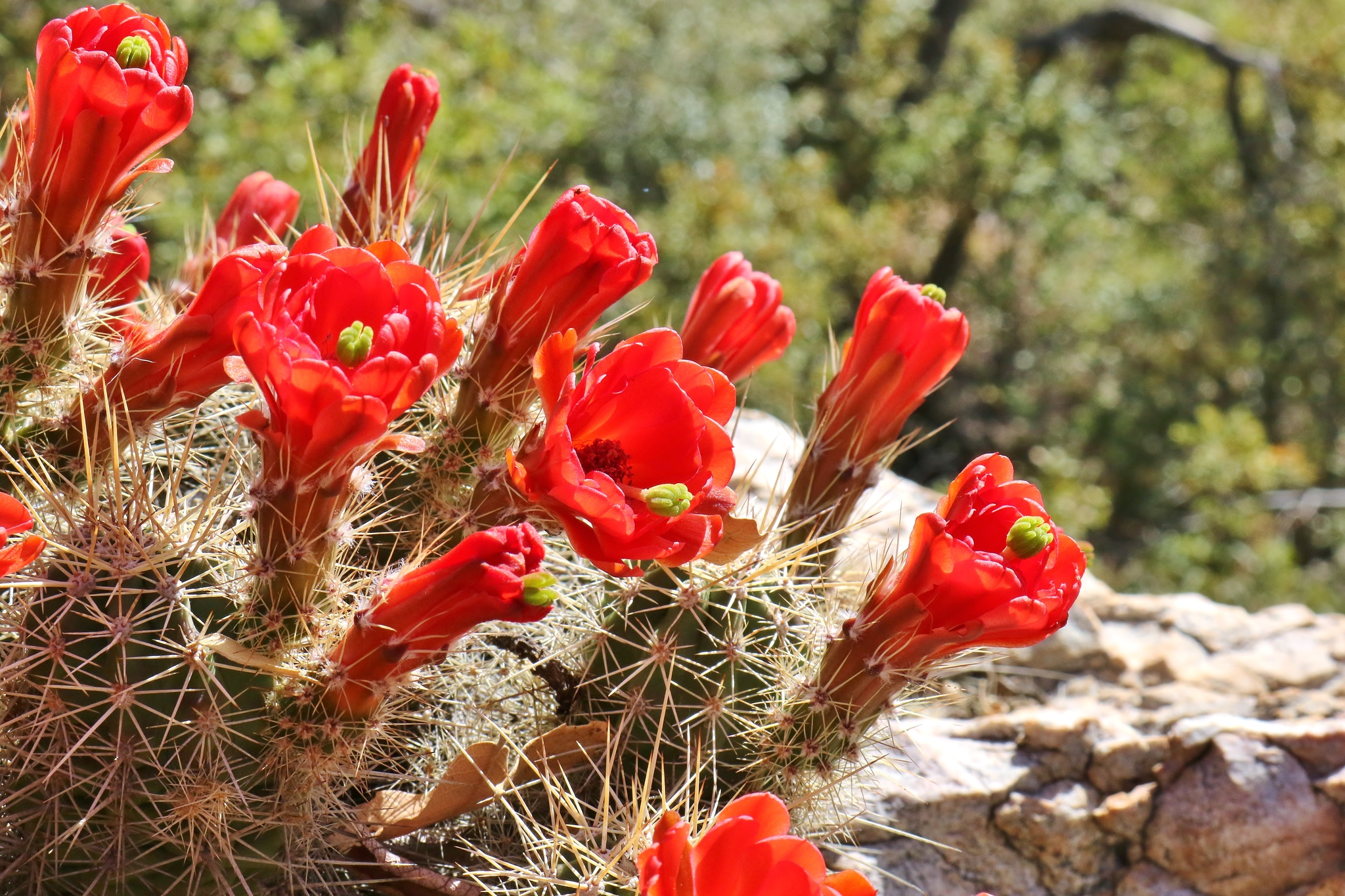
- Scarlet hedgehog cactus

Conservation status
- Least Concern (IUCN 3.1)

Scientific classification
- Kingdom: Plantae
- Clade: Tracheophytes
- Clade: Angiosperms
- Clade: Eudicots
- Order: Caryophyllales
- Family: Cactaceae
- Subfamily: Cactoideae
- Genus: Echinocereus
- Species: E. santaritensis

Binomial name
- Echinocereus santaritensis W.Blum & Rutow 1998

Synonyms
- Echinocereus coccineus subsp. santaritensis (W.Blum & Rutow) M.A.Baker 2014

= Echinocereus santaritensis =

Species of cactus

Echinocereus santaritensis is a species of cactus native to Mexico and the United States.

== Description ==
Echinocereus santaritensis is a multistem columnar cactus that branches from the base. The cylindrical stems are 30 cm (12 in) long and have a diameter of 5.5 cm (2.2 in). There are nine to ten clearly blunt ribs, which are densely spiny with areoles 1 cm (0.39 in) apart. There are up to ten yellow to gray radial spines and three to four central spines that are 2.5 to 4 cm (0.98 to 1.57 in). The tubular-funnel-shaped flowers are bisexual, red-orange, 5 to 11 cm (2.0 to 4.3 in) long and 3 to 4 cm (1.2 to 1.6 in) diameter with a long 5 cm (2.0 in) style. Chromosome count is 2n=44

This species is distinguished by its perfect flowers, 5 cm long styles, and areoles with hairs.

=== Subspecies ===
Accepted subspecies:

Image	Subspecies	Distribution
	E. s. subsp. bacanorensis (W.Rischer & Trocha) W.Rischer & D.Felix	Mexico (Sonora, Chihuahua)
	E. s. subsp. santaritensis	Arizona to New Mexico and Mexico (Sonora, Chihuahua)

== Distribution ==
This species is found growing on rocky slopes and outcrops in southern Arizona in the Little Ajo Mountains and Tucson Mountains, New Mexico and Mexico in Sonora and Chihuahua above 1070 meters growing along Juniperus arizonica and Vauquelinia californica.

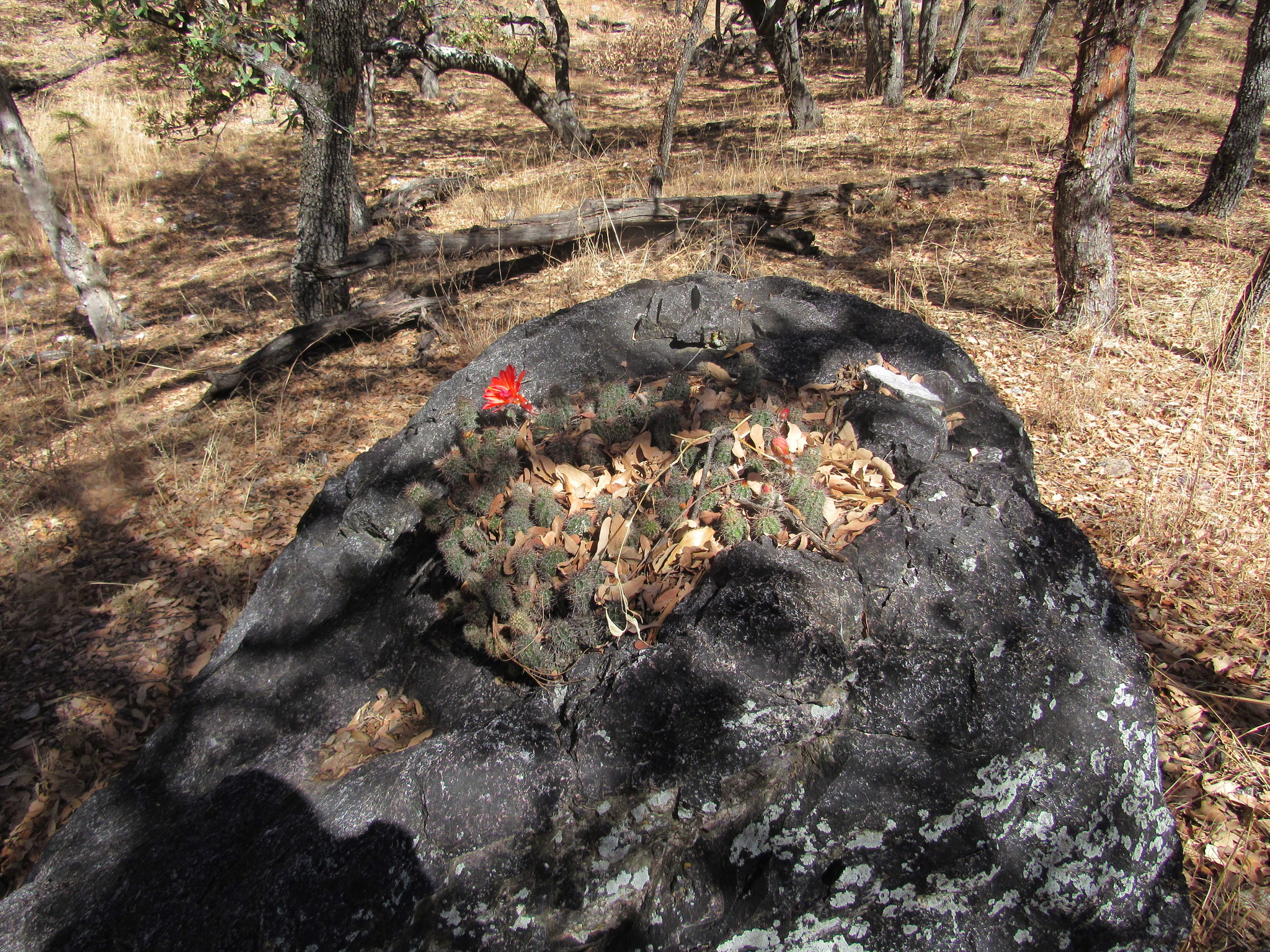
Echinocereus santaritensis bacanorensis in Sahuaripa, Son., México

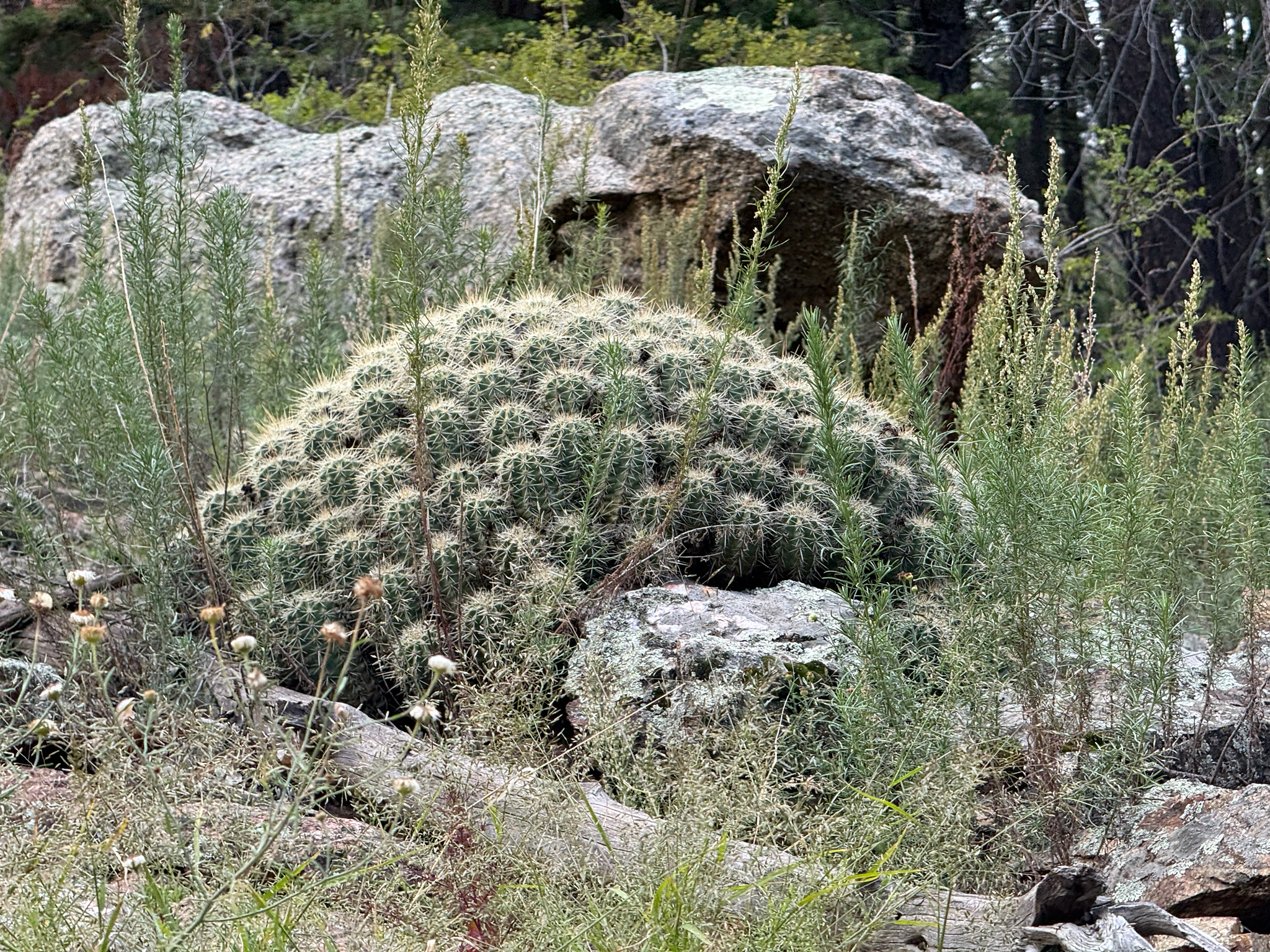
Echinocereus santaritensis in Swift Trail Junction, Arizona

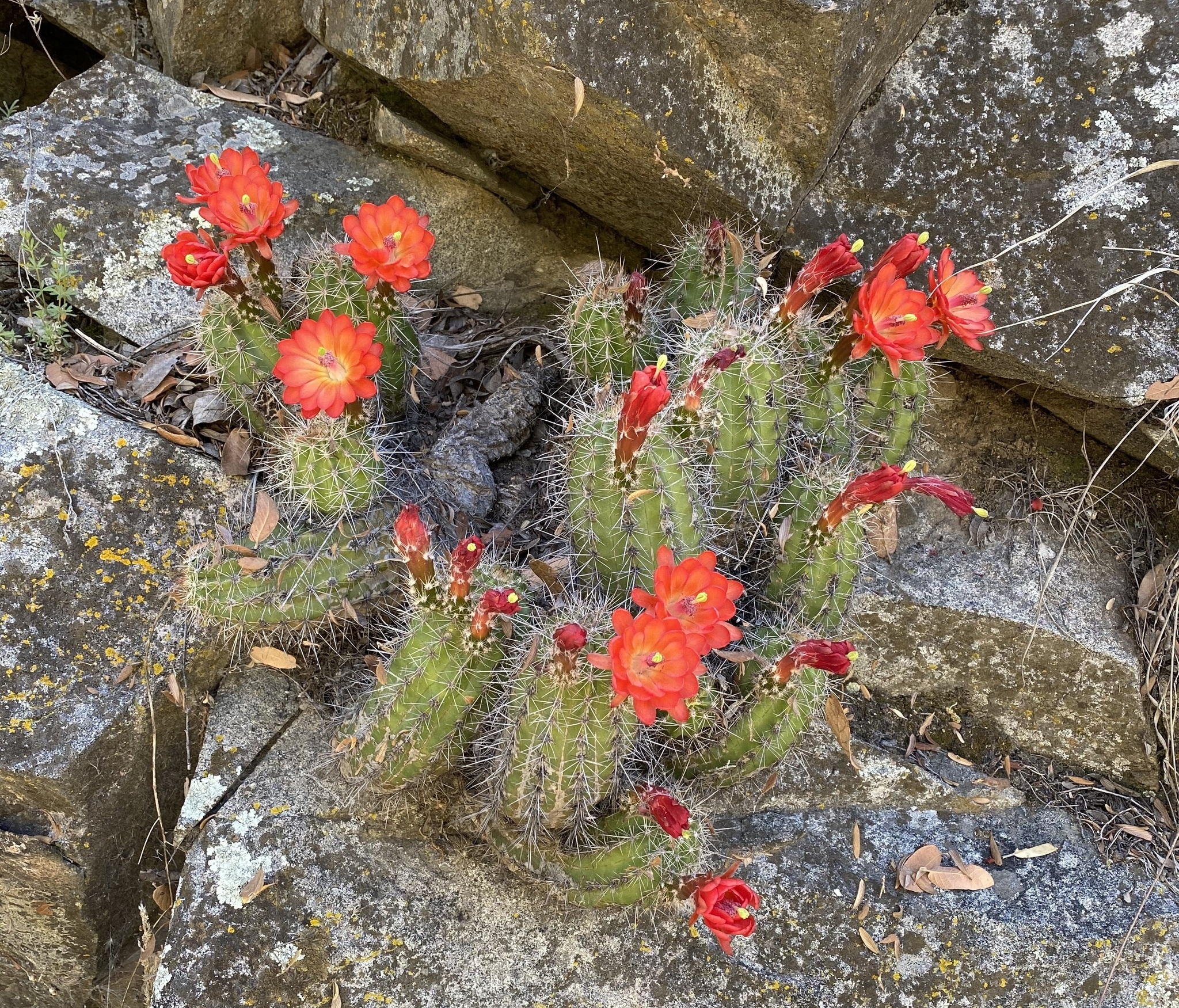
Echinocereus santaritensis in Rio Rico, Arizona

== Taxonomy ==
Echinocereus santaritensis was first described as in 1998 from plants collected in the Santa Rita Mountains. It was moved to a subspecies of Echinocereus coccineus in 2014 and later moved back to a species.
