= Microblepsis manleyi =

Scientific classification
- Domain: Eukaryota
- Kingdom: Animalia
- Phylum: Arthropoda
- Class: Insecta
- Order: Lepidoptera
- Family: Drepanidae
- Genus: Microblepsis
- Species: M. manleyi

Binomial name
- Microblepsis manleyi (Leech, 1898)

Synonyms
- Drepana manleyi Leech, 1898; Betalbara manleyi

Species of hook-tip moth

Microblepsis manleyi is a moth in the family Drepanidae. It was described by John Henry Leech in 1898. It is found in Zhejiang in China and in Japan.

The wingspan is 30–33 mm. The forewings are pale ochreous brown transversed by two lines, the first curved and slightly indented below the costa, while the second is dark brown and angled below the costa, where it is joined by a short oblique line from the apex. There is a black spot in the cell and the apex is purplish brown. The submarginal line is brown and runs from the angle of the second line to the inner margin. The hindwings are pale straw, dusted with pale ochreous brown, transversed by four brownish lines.

The larvae feed on Carpinus, Corylus, Juglans and Pourthiaea species.

== Subspecies ==
- Microblepsis manleyi manleyi (Japan)
- Microblepsis manleyi prolatior (Watson, 1968) (China: Zhejiang)
