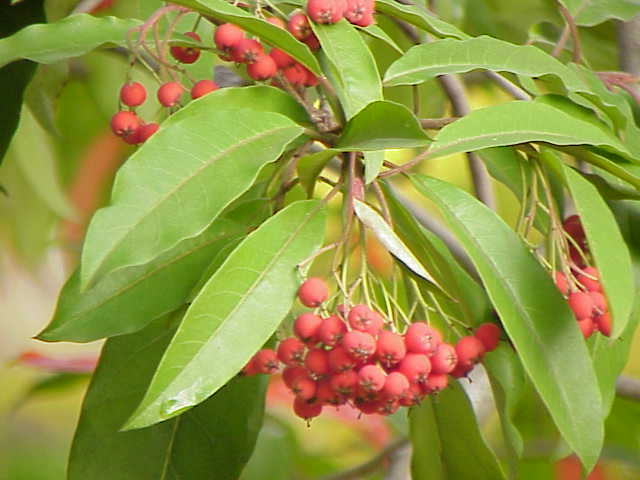
- Stranvaesia davidiana fruit

Scientific classification
- Kingdom: Plantae
- Clade: Embryophytes
- Clade: Tracheophytes
- Clade: Angiosperms
- Clade: Eudicots
- Clade: Rosids
- Order: Rosales
- Family: Rosaceae
- Subfamily: Amygdaloideae
- Tribe: Maleae
- Subtribe: Malinae
- Genus: Stranvaesia; Lindl.

Species
- See text

Synonyms
- × Stranvinia Coombes

= Stranvaesia =

Genus of flowering plants

Stranvaesia is a genus of flowering plants in the family Rosaceae. Its morphology is so similar to Photinia that it has sometimes been included within that genus, but recent molecular data indicate that the two genera are distinct.

== Species ==
Three species are accepted.

- Stranvaesia lasiogyna (Franch.) B.B.Liu
- Stranvaesia nussia (Buch.-Ham. ex D.Don) Decne.
- Stranvaesia oblanceolata (Rehder & E.H.Wilson) Stapf

=== Formerly placed here ===
- Photinia davidiana (Decne.) Cardot (as Stranvaesia davidiana Decne.)
- Photinia microphylla (J.E.Vidal) B.B.Liu (as Stranvaesia microphylla J.E.Vidal)
- Pourthiaea amphidoxa (C.K.Schneid.) Stapf (as Stranvaesia amphidoxa C.K.Schneid.)
- Pourthiaea tomentosa (T.T.Yu & T.C.Ku) B.B.Liu & J.Wen (aș Stranvaesia tomentosa T.T.Yu & T.C.Ku)
