= List of botanical gardens in Chile =

Botanical gardens in Chile have collections consisting entirely of Chile native and endemic species; most have a collection that include plants from around the world. There are botanical gardens and arboreta in all states and territories of Chile, most are administered by local governments, some are privately owned.

- Arboretum de la Universidad Austral de Chile
- Jardín Botánico Chagual
- Jardín Botánico Nacional, Viña del Mar
- Parque Botánico Omara
- Jardín Botánico Chileflora
