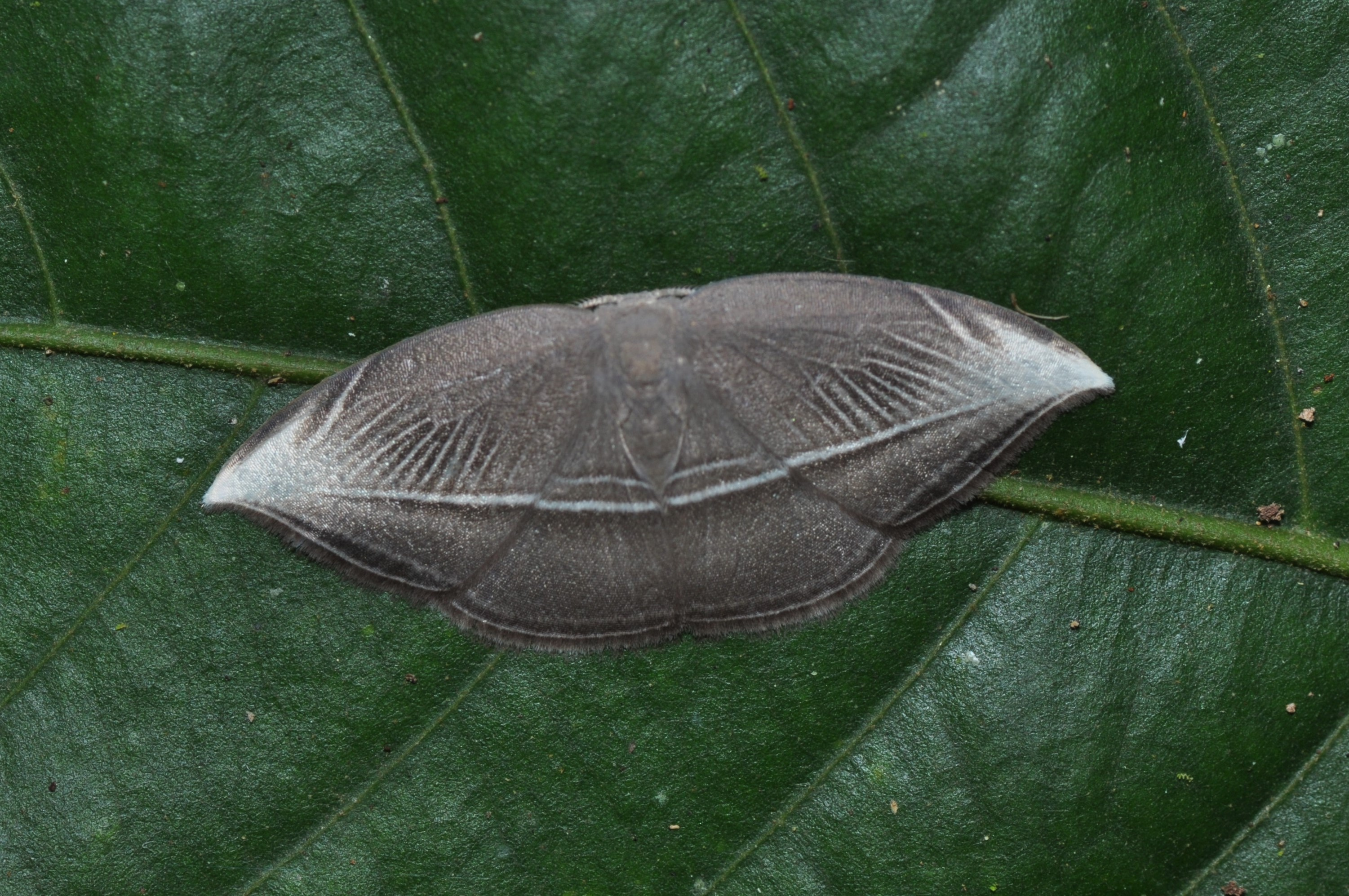

Scientific classification
- Kingdom: Animalia
- Phylum: Arthropoda
- Clade: Pancrustacea
- Class: Insecta
- Order: Lepidoptera
- Family: Drepanidae
- Genus: Microblepsis
- Species: M. leucosticta

Binomial name
- Microblepsis leucosticta (Hampson, 1895)

Synonyms
- Drepana leucosticta Hampson, 1895; Albara leucosticta; Betalbara leucosticta

= Microblepsis leucosticta =

Species of hook-tip moth

Microblepsis leucosticta is a moth in the family Drepanidae. It was described by George Hampson in 1895. It is found in the north-eastern Himalayas, southern China and on Peninsular Malaysia, Sumatra and Borneo.

The wingspan is about 28 mm. Adults are dark purplish grey, the forewings with a white postmedial line which is angled below the costa and runs into a large white apical patch. The veins between it and the cell are streaked with white and there are slender submarginal and marginal lines. The hindwings have two medial white lines and two indistinct fine white lines close to the margin.
