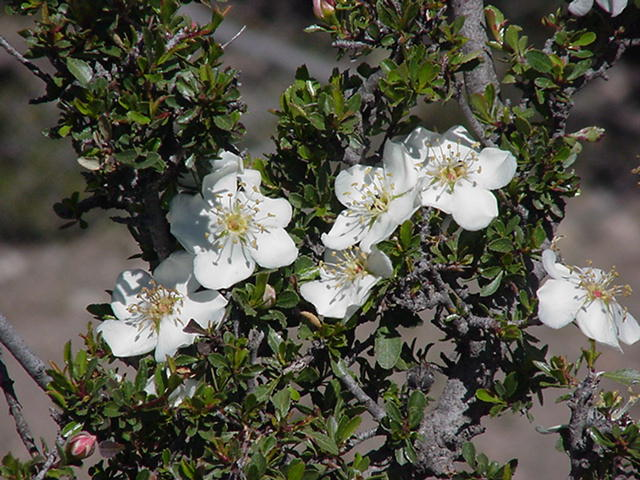
- Lindleya mespiloides in bloom

Scientific classification
- Kingdom: Plantae
- Clade: Tracheophytes
- Clade: Angiosperms
- Clade: Eudicots
- Clade: Rosids
- Order: Rosales
- Family: Rosaceae
- Subfamily: Amygdaloideae
- Tribe: Maleae; Small

Subtribes
- Lindleyinae; Malinae

Synonyms
- Crataegeae Koehne; Kageneckieae Takhtajan; Lindleyieae Takhtajan; Pomeae A. Gray; Pyreae Baill.; Sorbeae Koehne

= Maleae =

Maleae Temporal range: Eocene - recent

Tribe of flowering plants

The Maleae (incorrectly Pyreae) are the apple tribe in the rose family, Rosaceae. The group includes some plants bearing commercially important fruits, such as apples and pears, while others are cultivated as ornamentals. Older taxonomies separated some of this group as tribe Crataegeae, as the Cydonia group (a tentative placement), or some genera were placed in family Quillajaceae.

The tribe consists exclusively of shrubs and small trees. Most have pomes, a type of accessory fruit that does not occur in other Rosaceae. All except Vauquelinia (with 15 chromosomes) have a basal haploid chromosome count of 17, instead of 7, 8, or 9 as in the other Rosaceae.

There are approximately 28 genera that contain about 1100 species worldwide, with most species occurring in the temperate Northern Hemisphere.

== Current classification ==
=== Core members of the group ===
A traditional circumscription of Maleae includes the following genera:

- Amelanchier - serviceberry, juneberry, saskatoon, sugarplum
- Aria - whitebeam
- Aronia - chokeberry
- Chaenomeles - Japanese quince
- Chamaemeles
- Chamaemespilus - false medlar
- Cormus - service tree
- Cydonia - quince
- Dichotomanthes
- Docynia
- Docyniopsis
- Eriobotrya -loquat
- Eriolobus
- Hesperomeles
- Heteromeles - toyon
- Malacomeles - false serviceberry
- Malus - apple, crabapple
- Osteomeles
- Peraphyllum - wild crab apple, squaw apple
- Phippsiomeles
- Photinia
- Pourthiaea
- Pseudocydonia - Chinese quince
- Pyrus - pear
- Rhaphiolepis - hawthorn
- Sorbus (s.s.) - rowan
- Stranvaesia
- Torminalis - chequer tree

intergeneric hybrids:

- × Amelasorbus
- × Malosorbus
- × Sorbaronia
- × Sorbopyrus

and graft chimeras:
+ Pyrocydonia (Pirocydonia)

=== Tribe Crataegeae ===
A recent taxonomic treatment includes the following genera in Maleae that were earlier separated as tribe Crataegeae (or as intertribe hybrids):

- Cotoneaster - cotoneaster
- Crataegus - hawthorn
- Mespilus - medlar
- Pyracantha - firethorn

intergeneric (including intertribal) hybrids:

- × Crataemespilus
- × Crataegosorbus
- × Sorbocotoneaster

and the graft hybrid:

- + Crataegomespilus

=== Former members of family Quillajaceae ===
The following genera were previously placed in tribe Quillajeae in Rosaceae, or in family Quillajaceae. Their fruit is dry capsules, not pomes.

- Kageneckia
- Vauquelinia
- Lindleya

== The Cydonia group ==
The Cydonia group within the Maloid Rosaceae was a tentative grouping of pome-fruited genera with many ovules (rather than just two) per carpel. The genera involved were:

- Cydonia
- Chaenomeles
- Docynia
- Pseudocydonia

It is not yet clear whether this group is monophyletic within the Maleae. Molecular data indicate a close relationship between Cydonia and Pseudocydonia. Multiple ovules per carpel also occur in Kageneckia, a non-pome-bearing genus. Chloroplast DNA analysis, but not nuclear DNA, shows a tight relationship between Cydonia and Dichotomanthes, a non-pome-bearing genus.
