= Stranvaesia oblanceolata =

Scientific classification
- Kingdom: Plantae
- Clade: Tracheophytes
- Clade: Angiosperms
- Clade: Eudicots
- Clade: Rosids
- Order: Rosales
- Family: Rosaceae
- Genus: Stranvaesia
- Species: S. oblanceolata

Binomial name
- Stranvaesia oblanceolata (Rehder & E.H.Wilson) Stapf

Synonyms
- Pyrus oblanceolata (Rehder & E.H.Wilson) M.F.Fay & Christenh.; Stranvaesia nussia var. oblanceolata Rehder & E.H.Wilson; Photinia brandisii Stapf; Stranvaesia brandisii Stapf

Species of flowering plant

Stranvaesia oblanceolata is a species of flowering plant in the family Rosaceae. It is a shrub or tree native to south-central China (southern Yunnan) and northern Indochina (Myanmar, Laos, and Thailand).
