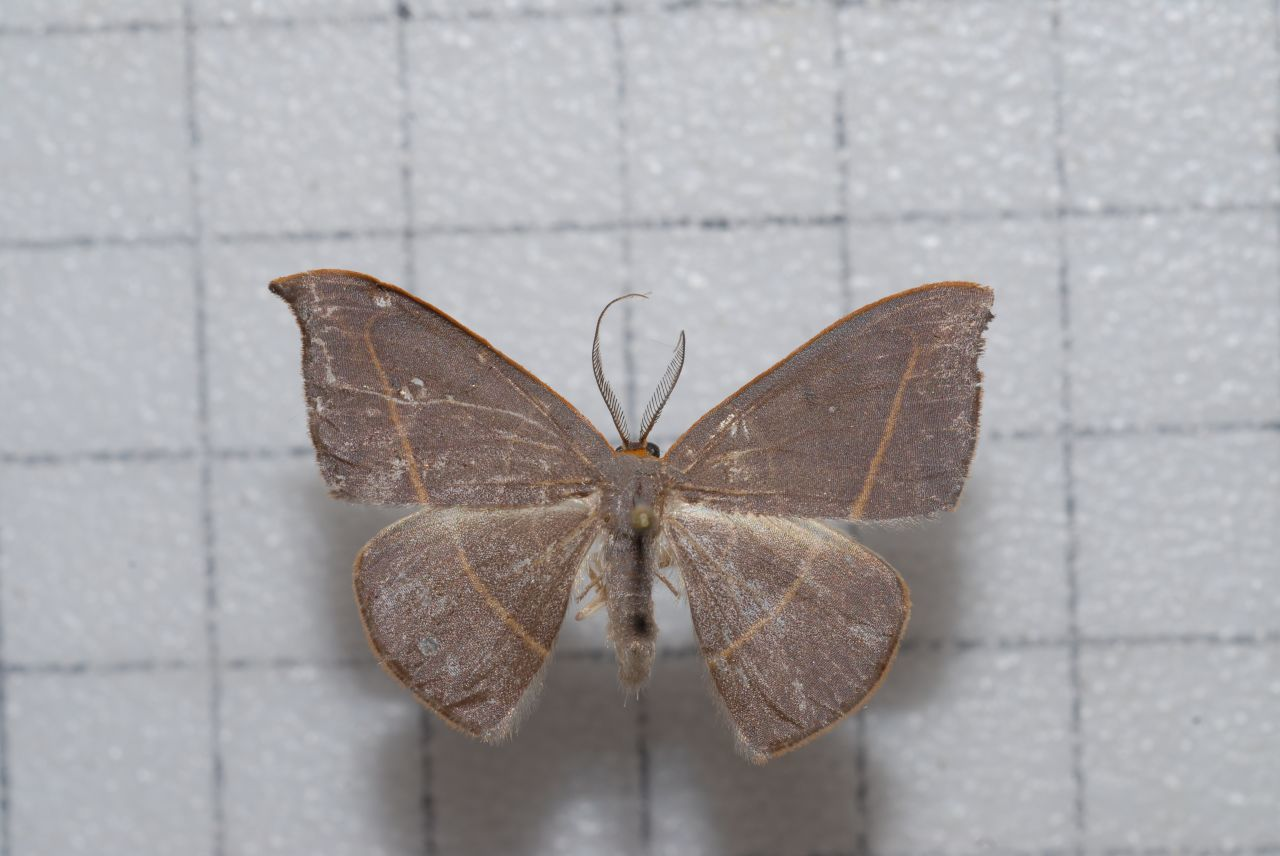
- Microblepsis violacea

Scientific classification
- Domain: Eukaryota
- Kingdom: Animalia
- Phylum: Arthropoda
- Class: Insecta
- Order: Lepidoptera
- Family: Drepanidae
- Subfamily: Drepaninae
- Genus: Microblepsis; Warren, 1922

Synonyms
- Betalbara Matsumura, 1927

= Microblepsis =

Moth genus in family Drepanidae

Microblepsis is a genus of moths belonging to the subfamily Drepaninae.

== Species ==
- Microblepsis acuminata (Leech, 1890)
- Microblepsis cupreogrisea (Hampson, 1895)
- Microblepsis flavilinea (Leech, 1890)
- Microblepsis leucosticta (Hampson, 1895)
- Microblepsis manleyi (Leech, 1898)
- Microblepsis prunicolor (Moore, 1888)
- Microblepsis rectilinea (Watson, 1968)
- Microblepsis robusta (Oberthür, 1916)
- Microblepsis rugosa (Watson, 1968)
- Microblepsis violacea (Butler, 1889)
