= Jardín Botánico Chagual =

The Jardín Botánico Chagual is a 33.9-hectare Chilean botanical garden in the process of development, focusing on the preservation of plants native to the Mediterranean climatic zone of Chile (between 30° and 38° S latitude). It forms part of the Sistema Nacional de Áreas Protegidas del Estado (SNASPE; National System of Protected Areas of the Country) and of the Botanic Gardens Conservation International (BGCI). It is meant to complement the collections of native plants in the national botanical gardens of Viña del Mar and Valdivia.

== Location ==
The Jardín Botánico Chagual is located in the Metropolitan Park of Santiago, a park situated in central Santiago, Chile. The terrain includes flat zones, slopes, gorges and small hills.

== History ==
The foundation of the botanical garden is linked with a nonprofit Municipal Cultural Corporation, which was announced publicly in September 2002. Its location and its affiliation with BGCI allow it to play an important role in the exhibition, conservation and study of plants in its region, as well as in botanical education. It has received the Sello Bicentenario 2004 (Bicentennial Seal 2004) of the Chilean government, part of the preparations for the 2010 celebrations of the Bicentennial of Chile.

== Collections ==
The Jardín Botánico Chagual specializes in the Mediterranean climatic zone of Chile and its rich pool of endemic plants. It is estimated that 30% of the over 3000 plant species of this zone are endemic, or found only in this area.

Currently the Jardín Botánico Chagual contains the following collections:

- Evergreen trees and shrubs (Beilschmiedia miersii, Cryptocarya alba, and Peumus boldus, Lithraea caustica, and Quillaja saponaria); deciduous trees and shrubs (Nothofagus macrocarpa, N. obliqua, N. glauca, N. alessandrii); thorn bushes and related members of the Rosaceae (Kageneckia angustifolia); and mountain cypress (Austrocedrus chilensis)
- Bromeliaceae of Chile
- Amaryllidaceae and Liliaceae of Chile

Additional new collections are planned.
