= Microblepsis flavilinea =

Scientific classification
- Domain: Eukaryota
- Kingdom: Animalia
- Phylum: Arthropoda
- Class: Insecta
- Order: Lepidoptera
- Family: Drepanidae
- Genus: Microblepsis
- Species: M. flavilinea

Binomial name
- Microblepsis flavilinea (Leech, 1890)

Synonyms
- Albara flavilinea Leech, 1890; Drepana flavilinea; Betalbara flavilinea shensiensis Watson, 1968

Species of hook-tip moth

Microblepsis flavilinea is a moth in the family Drepanidae. It was described by John Henry Leech in 1890. It is found in China.

The wingspan is about 32 mm. Adults are smoky grey, tinged with violet. The basal line of the forewings is yellowish and the central line is yellow, starting from the yellowish apex. The submarginal line is also yellowish, narrow and united with the central line towards the apex. All lines are continued on the hindwings.

== Subspecies ==
- Microblepsis flavilinea flavilinea (China: Hubei, Jiangxi, Zhejiang)
- Microblepsis flavilinea shensiensis (Watson, 1968) (China: Shaanxi)
