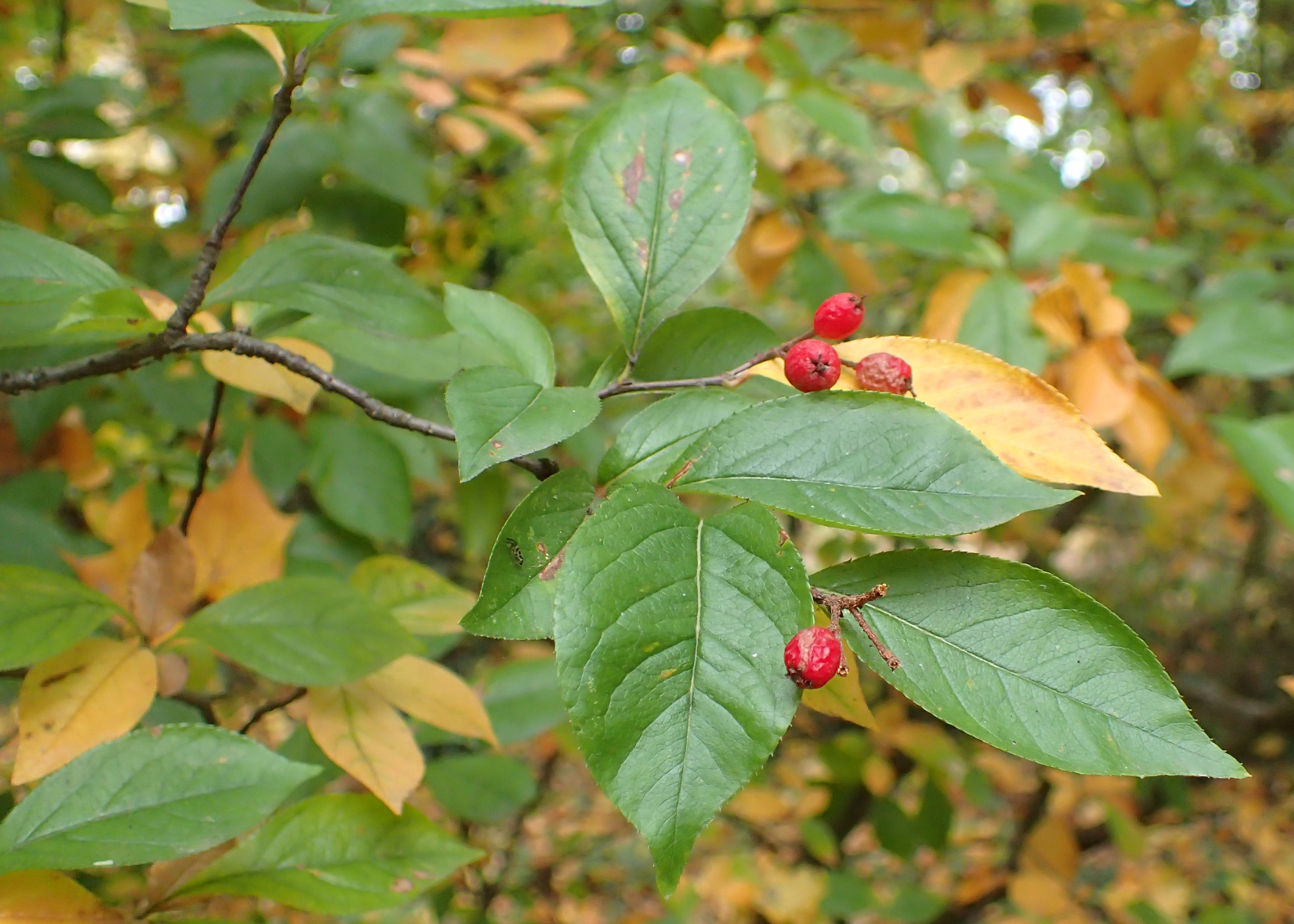
- Pourthiaea villosa, Kórnik Arboretum, Poland

Scientific classification
- Kingdom: Plantae
- Clade: Tracheophytes
- Clade: Angiosperms
- Clade: Eudicots
- Clade: Rosids
- Order: Rosales
- Family: Rosaceae
- Subfamily: Amygdaloideae
- Tribe: Maleae
- Genus: Pourthiaea; Decne.

= Pourthiaea =

Genus of flowering plants

Pourthiaea is a genus of deciduous shrubs and small trees in the rose family (Rosaceae), tribe Maleae. Recent genetic studies have shown the genus to be monophyletic; prior to this, the genus was formerly treated either as a section within Photinia, or alternatively as a synonym of Aronia; some of the species have also been treated in Stranvaesia in the past.

Its native range is East Asia and Indo-China. It is found in the regions of Assam, Bangladesh, (north-central, south-central and southeastern) China, East Himalaya, Japan, Korea, Laos, Myanmar, Taiwan, Thailand, Tibet and Vietnam.

The genus name of Pourthiaea is in honour of J. A. Pourthié (1830–1866), a French clergyman and also missionary in Korea. It was first described and published in the Nouvelles Archives du Muséum d'Histoire Naturelle (Paris), Volume 10, page 146, in 1874.

== Species ==
The Plants of the World Online database accepts 17 species:

- Pourthiaea amphidoxa (C.K.Schneid.) Stapf
- Pourthiaea arguta (Wall. ex Lindl.) Decne.
- Pourthiaea beauverdiana (C.K.Schneid.) Hatus.
- Pourthiaea blinii (H.Lév.) Iketani & H.Ohashi
- Pourthiaea brevifolia (Cardot) B.B.Liu
- Pourthiaea dabeishanensis (M.B.Deng & G.Yao) B.B.Liu
- Pourthiaea hirsuta (Hand.-Mazz.) Iketani & H.Ohashi
- Pourthiaea impressivena (Hayata) Iketani & H.Ohashi
- Pourthiaea lucida Decne.
- Pourthiaea magnoliifolia (Z.H.Chen) B.B.Liu
- Pourthiaea pilosicalyx (T.T.Yu) Iketani & H.Ohashi
- Pourthiaea pustulata (Lindl.) B.B.Liu
- Pourthiaea salicifolia Decne.
- Pourthiaea sorbifolia (W.B.Liao & W.Guo) B.B.Liu & D.Y.Hong
- Pourthiaea tomentosa (T.T.Yu & T.C.Ku) Long Y.Wang, W.Guo & W.B.Liao
- Pourthiaea villosa (Thunb.) Decne.
- Pourthiaea zhejiangensis (P.L.Chiu) Iketani & H.Ohashi

== Cultivation ==
Some species in the genus have been introduced into Malaya, and the American states of Connecticut, Delaware, District of Columbia, New Hampshire, New Jersey, New York, Ohio, Pennsylvania and Washington.
