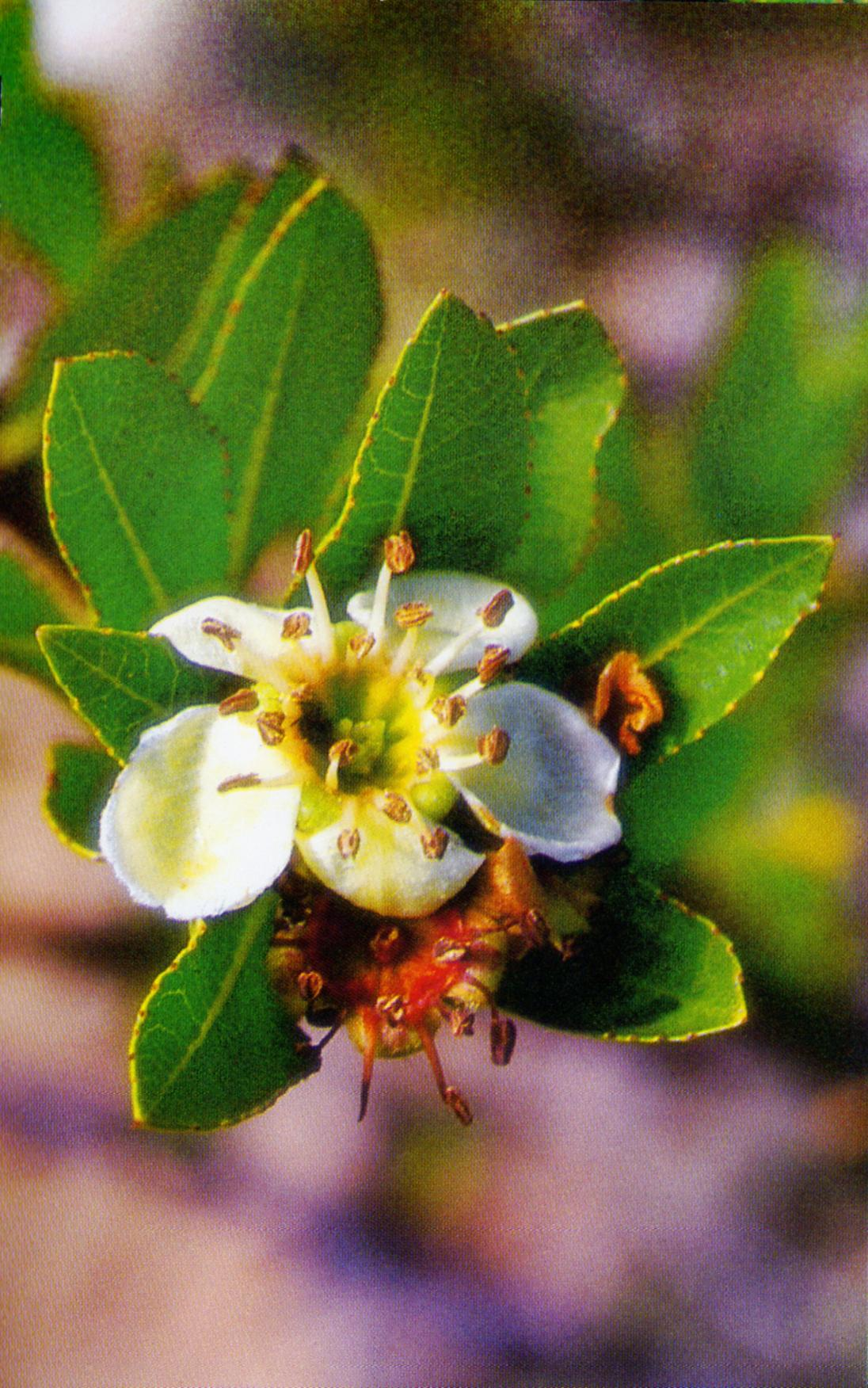
- Flowers and leaves.

Conservation status
- Vulnerable (IUCN 2.3)

Scientific classification
- Kingdom: Plantae
- Clade: Tracheophytes
- Clade: Angiosperms
- Clade: Eudicots
- Clade: Rosids
- Order: Rosales
- Family: Rosaceae
- Genus: Kageneckia
- Species: K. lanceolata

Binomial name
- Kageneckia lanceolata Ruiz & Pav.

Synonyms
- Kageneckia lanceolata normalis Kuntze; Kageneckia amygdalifolia C.Presl; Kageneckia glutinosa Kunth; Osteomeles pentlandiana Decne.

= Kageneckia lanceolata =

Species of plant

Kageneckia lanceolata is a species of flowering plant in the family Rosaceae. It is found in Bolivia and Peru. It is threatened by habitat loss.
