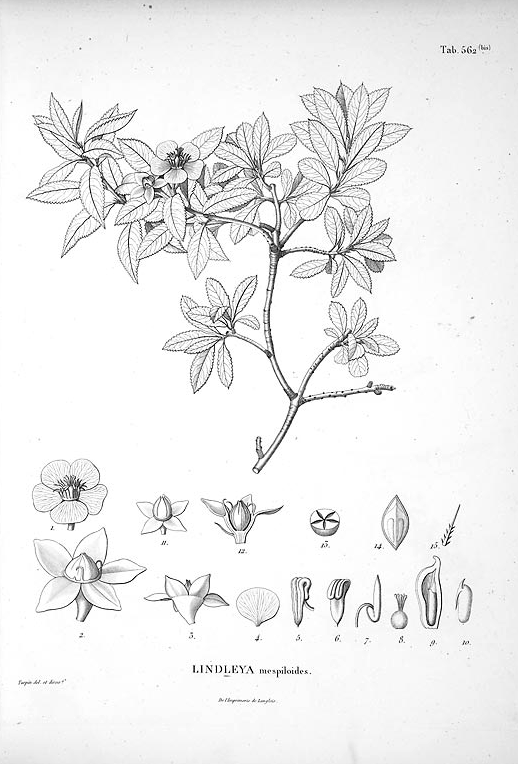
- Lindleya mespiloides Illustration by Pierre Jean François Turpin from Kunth, Bonpland, and Humboldt's Nova genera et species plantarum (1815–1825)

Scientific classification
- Kingdom: Plantae
- Clade: Tracheophytes
- Clade: Angiosperms
- Clade: Eudicots
- Clade: Rosids
- Order: Rosales
- Family: Rosaceae
- Tribe: Maleae
- Subtribe: Lindleyinae
- Genus: Lindleya; Knuth
- Species: L. mespiloides

Binomial name
- Lindleya mespiloides Kunth

= Lindleya =

Genus of trees

Lindleya is a genus of Mexican evergreen trees of the family Rosaceae, tribe Maleae. The sole species, Lindleya mespiloides, grows to a height of 6 metres (20 ft) and bears solitary white fragrant flowers in summer. The fruit are dry dehiscent capsules.

== Taxonomic history ==
Lindleya, along with Vauquelinia and Kageneckia were formerly placed in family Quillajaceae. It shares a base chromosome number of 17 with the pome-fruited members of tribe Maleae within the Rosaceae.

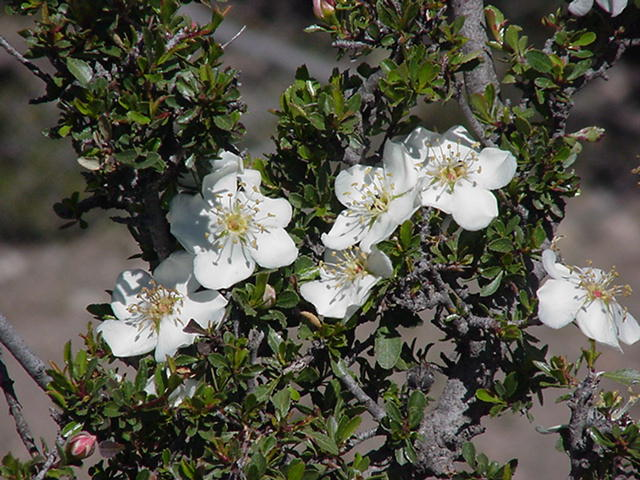
