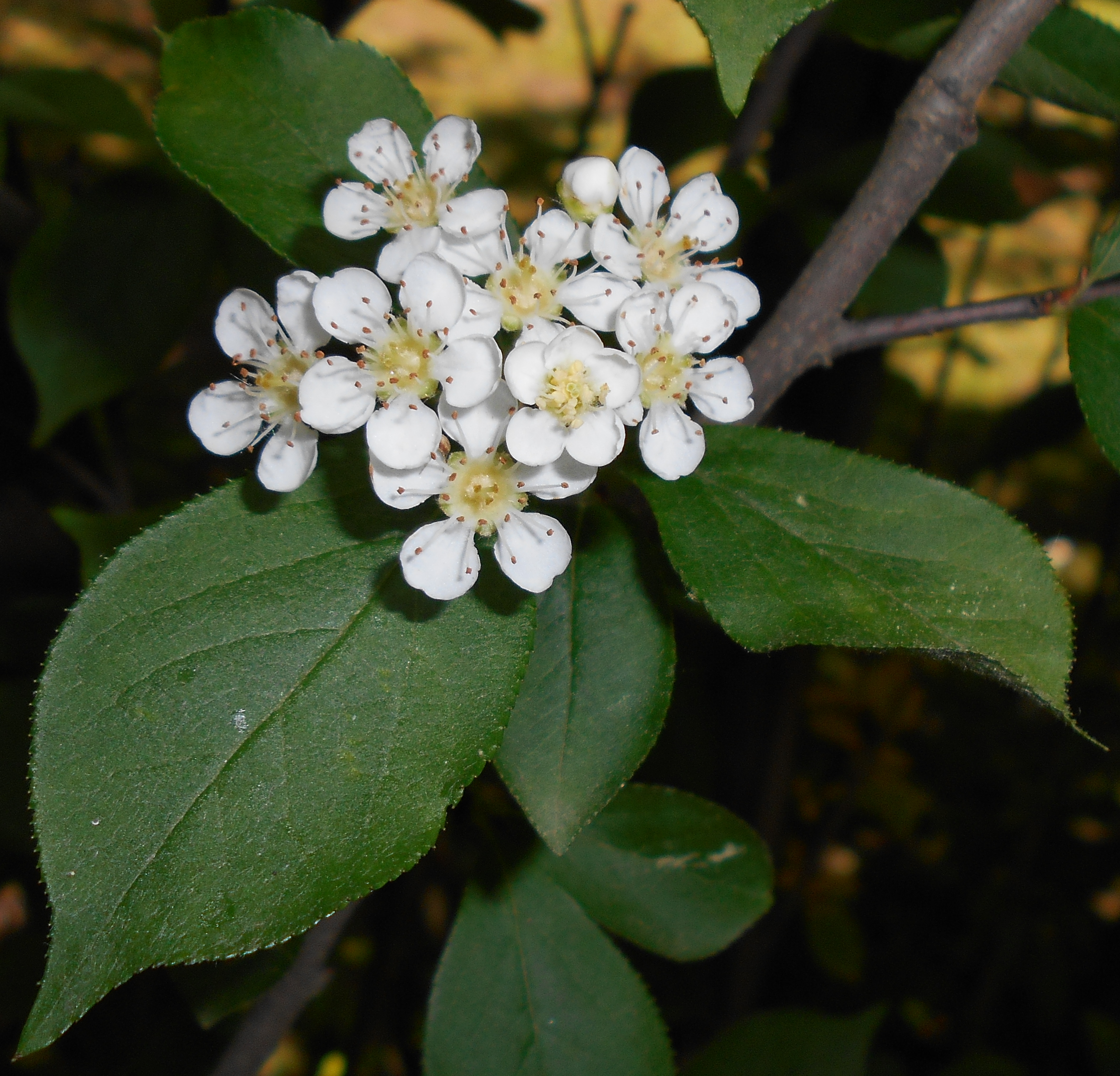

Conservation status
- Least Concern (IUCN 3.1)

Scientific classification
- Kingdom: Plantae
- Clade: Tracheophytes
- Clade: Angiosperms
- Clade: Eudicots
- Clade: Rosids
- Order: Rosales
- Family: Rosaceae
- Genus: Pourthiaea
- Species: P. villosa

Binomial name
- Pourthiaea villosa (Thunb.) Decne.

Synonyms
- Synonymy: Bobua japonica Miers; Crataegus cavaleriei H.Lév. & Vaniot; Crataegus laevis Thunb.; Crataegus villosa Thunb. (1784) (basionym); Dicalix japonica Nakai; Mespilus laevis (Thunb.) Poir.; Mespilus villosa (Thunb.) Poir.; Myrtus laevis Thunb.; Photinia arguta var. laevis (Thunb.) Wenz.; Photinia arguta var. sinensis Cardot; Photinia arguta var. villosa (Thunb.) Wenz.; Photinia cardotii F.P.Metcalf; Photinia cotoneaster (Decne.) Cardot; Photinia komarovii (H.Lév. & Vaniot) L.T.Lu & C.L.Li; Photinia koreana Lancaster; Photinia laevis (Thunb.) DC.; Photinia laevis var. villosa (Thunb.) Koidz.; Photinia parvifolia (E.Pritz.) C.K.Schneid.; Photinia parvifolia var. kankoensis (Hatus.) T.T.Yu & K.C.Kuan; Photinia parvifolia var. subparvifolia (Y.K.Li & X.M.Wang) L.T.Lu & C.L.Li; Photinia parvifolia var. tenuipes (P.S.Hsu & L.C.Li) P.L.Chiu; Photinia subparvifolia Y.K.Li & X.M.Wang; Photinia subumbellata Rehder & E.H.Wilson; Photinia subumbellata var. villosa Cardot; Photinia variabilis F.B.Forbes & Hemsl.; Photinia villosa (Thunb.) DC.; Photinia villosa var. brunnea (H.Lév.) M.Kim; Photinia villosa var. coreana (Decne.) Rehder; Photinia villosa var. emergens Cardot; Photinia villosa var. glabricalycina L.T.Lu & C.L.Li; Photinia villosa var. laevis (Thunb.) Miq.; Photinia villosa f. maximowicziana (H.Lév.) Rehder; Photinia villosa var. parvifolia (E.Pritz.) P.S.Hsu & L.Chu Li; Photinia villosa var. sinica Rehder & E.H.Wilson; Photinia villosa var. tenuipes P.S.Hsu & L.Chu Li; Photinia villosa var. typica C.K.Schneid.; Photinia villosa var. zollingeri (Decne.) C.K.Schneid.; Photinia wuyishanensis Z.X.Yu; Pourthiaea brunnea (H.Lév.) Chang; Pourthiaea coreana Decne.; Pourthiaea cotoneaster Decne.; Pourthiaea kankoensis Hatus.; Pourthiaea laevis (Thunb.) Koidz.; Pourthiaea laevis var. albescens (H.Lév.) Nakai; Pourthiaea laevis var. crassiuscula Nakai; Pourthiaea laevis var. parvifolia (E.Pritz.) Migo; Pourthiaea laevis var. villosa (Thunb.) Koidz.; Pourthiaea laevis var. yesoensis (Nakai) Nakai; Pourthiaea laevis var. zollingeri (Decne.) Koidz.; Pourthiaea lanata Nakai; Pourthiaea oldhamii Decne.; Pourthiaea parvifolia E.Pritz.; Pourthiaea thunbergii Decne.; Pourthiaea variabilis Palib.; Pourthiaea villosa var. brunnea (H.Lév.) Nakai; Pourthiaea villosa var. coreana (Decne.) Nakai; Pourthiaea villosa var. laevis (Thunb.) Stapf; Pourthiaea villosa var. laevis (Thunb.) T.B.Lee; Pourthiaea villosa var. oblongifolia Murata; Pourthiaea villosa f. oblongifolia (Murata) Satomi; Pourthiaea villosa var. parvifolia (E.Pritz.) Iketani & H.Ohashi; Pourthiaea villosa var. sinica (Rehder & E.H.Wilson) Migo; Pourthiaea villosa var. tenuipes (P.S.Hsu & L.Chu Li) Iketani & H.Ohashi; Pourthiaea villosa var. typica (C.K.Schneid.) Nakai; Pourthiaea villosa var. yakusimensis Masam.; Pourthiaea villosa var. yokohamensis Nakai; Pourthiaea villosa var. zollingeri (Decne.) C.K.Schneid.; Pourthiaea zollingeri Decne.; Pourthiaea zollingeri var. yesoensis Nakai; Pyrus brunnea H.Lév.; Pyrus fantabulosa M.F.Fay & Christenh.; Pyrus komarovii (H.Lév. & Vaniot) M.F.Fay & Christenh.; Pyrus maximowicziana (H.Lév.) Nakai; Pyrus mokpoensis H.Lév.; Pyrus sinensis var. maximowicziana H.Lév.; Pyrus spectabilis var. albescens H.Lév.; Pyrus villosa (Thunb.) M.F.Fay & Christenh.; Rhaphiolepis laevis Lodd. ex G.Don; Sorbus terminalis Anon.; Sorbus villosa Zabel; Sorbus villosa f. laevis Zabel; Stranvaesia digyna Siebold & Zucc.; Symplocos japonica A.DC.; Symplocos lucida Siebold & Zucc.; Viburnum komarovii H.Lév. & Vaniot

= Pourthiaea villosa =

Species of shrub

Pourthiaea villosa is a species in the flowering plant family Rosaceae, with common names Christmas berry and oriental photinia. It is a shrub or small tree up to 5 metres (16 ft) tall, native to China, Japan, Korea, Indochina, and the eastern Himalayas.

This plant was recently introduced into the United States, likely as a landscaping or garden plant. It has escaped cultivation and has become increasingly invasive in northern New Jersey, eastern Pennsylvania, and parts of Virginia, New York and Connecticut.
