= Microblepsis cupreogrisea =

Scientific classification
- Kingdom: Animalia
- Phylum: Arthropoda
- Class: Insecta
- Order: Lepidoptera
- Family: Drepanidae
- Genus: Microblepsis
- Species: M. cupreogrisea

Binomial name
- Microblepsis cupreogrisea (Hampson, 1895)

Synonyms
- Problepsidis cupreogrisea Hampson, 1895; Betalbara cupreogrisea

Species of hook-tip moth

Microblepsis cupreogrisea is a moth in the family Drepanidae. It was described by George Hampson in 1895. It is found in Myanmar, the north-eastern Himalayas and on Borneo and Sumatra.

The wingspan is about 25 mm. Adults are leaden grey with a slight coppery tinge, the forewings with a dark ferruginous basal patch in and below the cell extending along the median nervure to the anal angle of the cell. There are two minute white specks on the discocellulars and the apex is orange with a black spot. There is an oblique line from below the apex to the middle of the inner margin and a dark ferruginous marginal band transversed by a fine white curved submarginal line and a fine orange marginal line. The hindwings have ferruginous medial and marginal bands, the latter transversed by fine pale submarginal and marginal lines.
