= Stranvaesia nussia =

Scientific classification
- Kingdom: Plantae
- Clade: Tracheophytes
- Clade: Angiosperms
- Clade: Eudicots
- Clade: Rosids
- Order: Rosales
- Family: Rosaceae
- Genus: Stranvaesia
- Species: S. nussia

Binomial name
- Stranvaesia nussia (Buch.-Ham. ex D.Don) Decne.

Synonyms
- Crataegus glauca Wall. ex G.Don; Eriobotrya ambigua Merr.; Mespilus glauca (Wall. ex G.Don) Gerst.; Photinia harmandii Cardot; Photinia nussia (Buch.-Ham. ex D.Don) Kalkman; Pyrus nussia Buch.-Ham. ex D.Don (1825) (basionym); Stranvaesia ambigua (Merr.) Nakai; Stranvaesia glauca (Wall. ex G.Don) Baill.; Stranvaesia glaucescens Lindl.; Stranvaesia glaucescens var. angustifolia Decne.; Stranvaesia harmandii (Cardot) J.E.Vidal; Stranvaesia nussia var. angustifolia (Decne.) C.K.Schneid.

Species of tree

Stranvaesia nussia is a species of flowering plant in the family Rosaceae. It is an evergreen tree which ranges from Nepal and Tibet to south-central China (Yunnan), Indochina (Laos, Myanmar, and Thailand), and the Philippines.

== Description ==
- Height: 5-9m tall.
- Branches: pilose when young, purple/brown when old.
- Petiole: 1 cm.

== Habitat ==
S. nussia are restricted to particular elevational ranges in the Himalayas, along with being a rare tree species found in the Binsar Wildlife Sanctuary.
