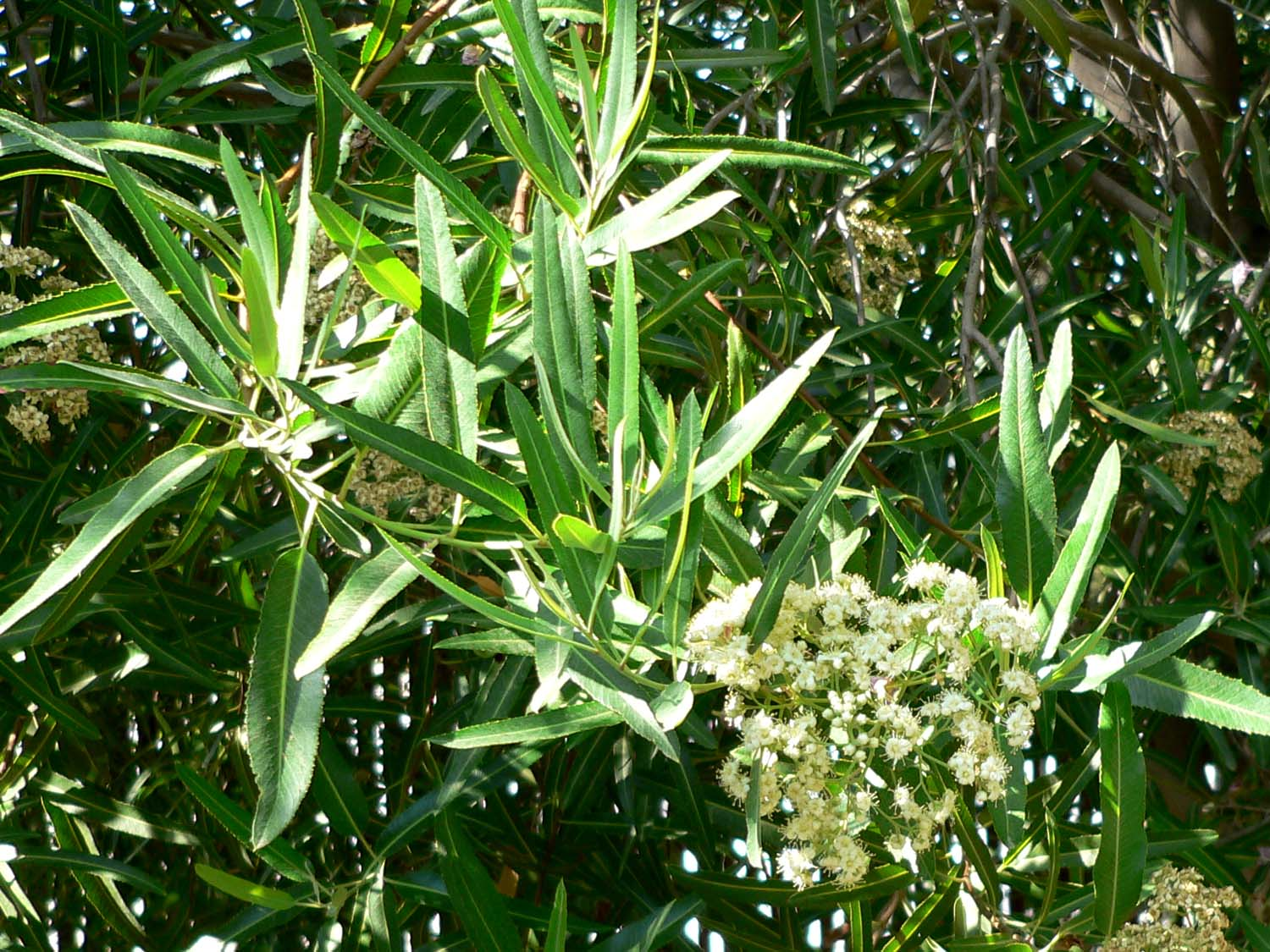
- Vauquelinia californica

Scientific classification
- Kingdom: Plantae
- Clade: Tracheophytes
- Clade: Angiosperms
- Clade: Eudicots
- Clade: Rosids
- Order: Rosales
- Family: Rosaceae
- Tribe: Maleae
- Genus: Vauquelinia; Corrêa ex Humb. Bonpl.

Species
- See text

= Vauquelinia =

Genus of shrubs

Vauquelinia, commonly known as the rosewoods, is a genus of the rose family, Rosaceae. It consists of four species of shrubs found in the southwestern United States and northern and central Mexico. The genus was named for French chemist Louis Nicolas Vauquelin (1763–1829). The nectar provided by these plants is commonly fed on by wasps such as Polistes instabilis.

V. californica is of some interest as an ornamental.

== Taxonomy ==
Vauquelinia, along with Lindleya and Kageneckia were formerly placed in family Quillajaceae, and have dry dehiscent fruit. Unlike the pome-fruited members of tribe Maleae within the Rosaceae, which share a base chromosome number of 17 with Lindleya and Kageneckia, Vauquelinia has a base chromosome number of 15.

=== Species ===
As of June 2021, four species and some subspecies were recognized:

- Vauquelinia angustifolia Rydb.
- Vauquelinia australis Standl.
- Vauquelinia californica (Torr.) Sarg. – Arizona rosewood
  - Vauquelinia californica ssp. californica
  - Vauquelinia californica ssp. pauciflora (Standl.) Hess & Henrickson
- Vauquelinia corymbosa Humb. & Bonpl. – slimleaf rosewood
  - Vauquelinia corymbosa ssp. angustifolia (Rydb.) Hess & Henrickson
  - Vauquelinia corymbosa ssp. corymbosa
