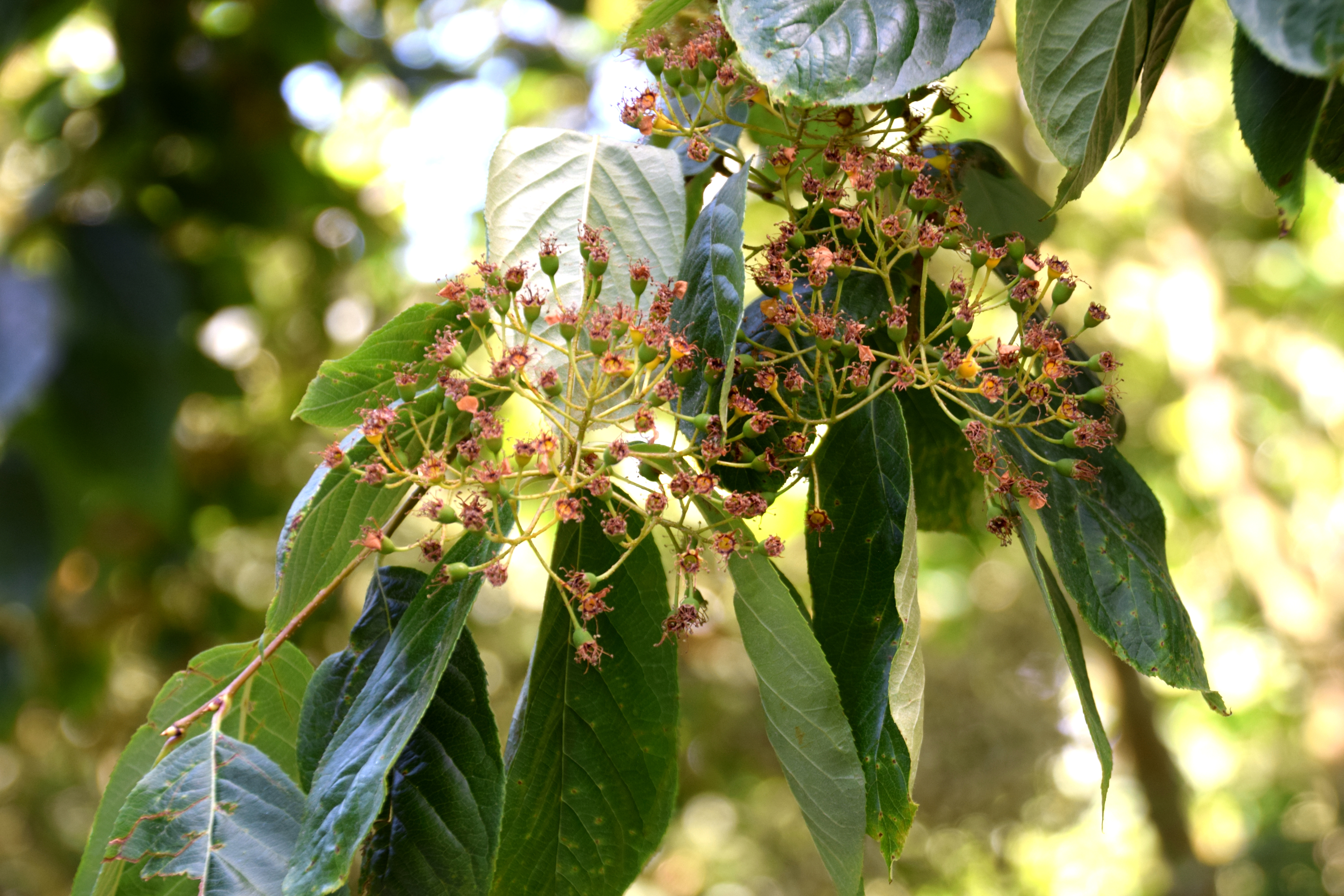

Scientific classification
- Kingdom: Plantae
- Clade: Tracheophytes
- Clade: Angiosperms
- Clade: Eudicots
- Clade: Rosids
- Order: Rosales
- Family: Rosaceae
- Genus: Pourthiaea
- Species: P. beauverdiana

Binomial name
- Pourthiaea beauverdiana (C.K.Schneid.) Hatus.

Synonyms
- Photinia beauverdiana C.K.Schneid. (1906) (basionym); Photinia beauverdiana var. notabilis (C.K.Schneid.) Rehder & E.H.Wilson; Photinia kudoi Masam.; Photinia notabilis C.K.Schneid.; Pourthiaea beauverdiana var. notabilis (C.K.Schneid.) Hatus.; Pyrus beauverdiana (C.K.Schneid.) M.F.Fay & Christenh.

= Pourthiaea beauverdiana =

Species of flowering plant

Pourthiaea beauverdiana, known commonly as the Christmas berry, is a species of deciduous shrub or tree It is native to central and southern China, Taiwan, northern Vietnam, and Bhutan in the eastern Himalaya.

The species was first described as Photinia beauverdiana by Camillo Karl Schneider in 1906. The species epithet honors Swiss botanist Gustave Beauverd (1867-1942). In 1933 Sumihiko Hatusima placed the species in genus Pourthiaea as Pourthiaea beauverdiana.

== Description ==
P. beauverdiana has a height range from 6.1 to 9.1 m (20 to 30 ft) and is known for its remarkable red-orange colors and showy red berries. It blooms from April to May and can tolerate temperatures down to −23 °C (−9 °F). They have leaves that are serrate, elliptical, to ovate and tips that are acute to caudate. They produce tiny, cup-shaped, orbicular white flowers with red fruits that produce up to four seeds.

== Habitat ==
The Christmas berry lives mountainside or woodland areas and thrives under full sun to partial shade. The shadier it gets for this plant, the more susceptible it is to leaf spot disease (Entomosporium maculatum) and will have less flowering. They grow best under medium moisture and can be resistant to droughts, deer, and rabbit.
