= Microblepsis prunicolor =

Scientific classification
- Domain: Eukaryota
- Kingdom: Animalia
- Phylum: Arthropoda
- Class: Insecta
- Order: Lepidoptera
- Family: Drepanidae
- Genus: Microblepsis
- Species: M. prunicolor

Binomial name
- Microblepsis prunicolor (Moore, 1888)

Synonyms
- Drepana prunicolor Moore, 1888; Albara prunicolor; Nordstroemia prunicolor; Betalbara prunicolor; Nordstroemia prunicolor warreni Bryk, 1943

Species of hook-tip moth

Microblepsis prunicolor is a moth in the family Drepanidae. It was described by Frederic Moore in 1888. It is found in north-eastern India, Sikkim, north-eastern Myanmar and possibly China.

The wingspan is about 36 mm. Adults are dark purplish grey, the forewings with an acutely angled yellowish antemedial line and a similar postmedial line met at the angle by a yellow line from the apex. There is also a pale submarginal line. The hindwings have slightly curved subbasal, medial, and submarginal yellowish lines.
