= Microblepsis acuminata =

Scientific classification
- Domain: Eukaryota
- Kingdom: Animalia
- Phylum: Arthropoda
- Class: Insecta
- Order: Lepidoptera
- Family: Drepanidae
- Genus: Microblepsis
- Species: M. acuminata

Binomial name
- Microblepsis acuminata (Leech, 1890)

Synonyms
- Drepana acuminata Leech, 1890; Platypteryx acuminata; Betalbara acuminata; Albara ogasawarae Matsumura, 1927; Drepana ida Bryk, 1942

Species of hook-tip moth

Microblepsis acuminata is a moth in the family Drepanidae. It was described by John Henry Leech in 1890. It is found in the Chinese provinces of Hubei and Shaanxi and in Japan.

The wingspan is about 39 mm. Adults are pale reddish brown, the apex of the forewings blackish and two dark brown lines transverse the disc of the wing. The first is deflected to the median nervurem then inflected to the inner margin and the second runs from the costa towards the outer margin, where it joins a darker apical streak. There is also an obscure submarginal line and two small black central spots. The hindwings have two central dark brown lines, the first curved and the second straight. There is also slightly wavy dark brown submarginal line.
