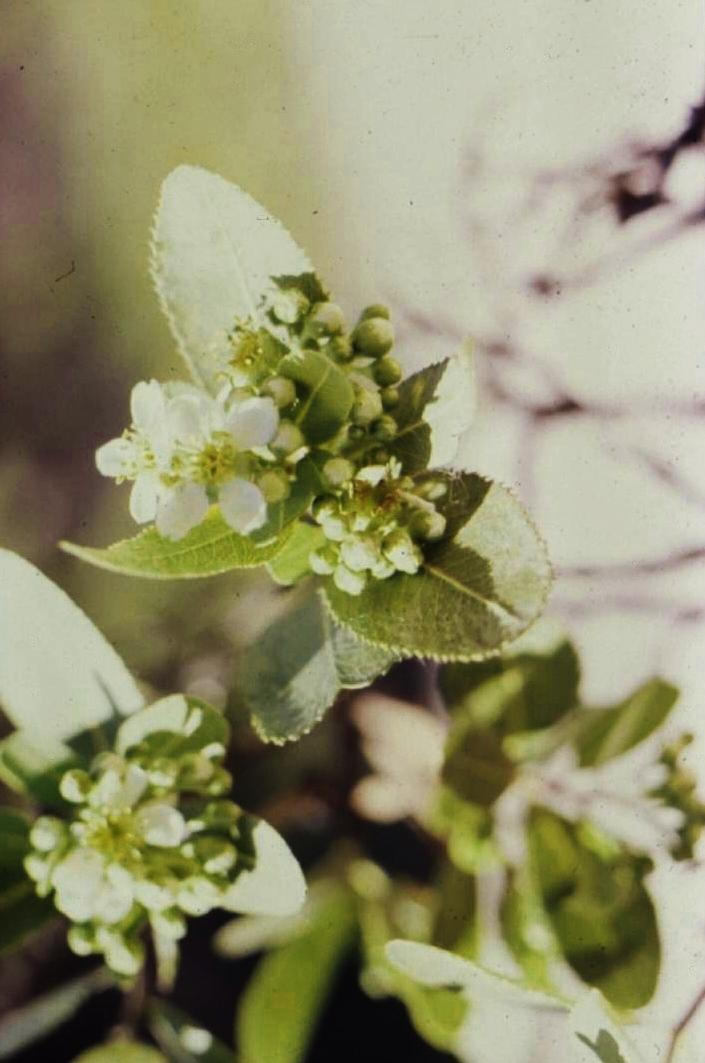
- Kageneckia oblonga

Scientific classification
- Kingdom: Plantae
- Clade: Tracheophytes
- Clade: Angiosperms
- Clade: Eudicots
- Clade: Rosids
- Order: Rosales
- Family: Rosaceae
- Tribe: Maleae
- Subtribe: Lindleyinae
- Genus: Kageneckia; Ruiz & Pav.

Synonyms
- Kagenackia Steud. (orth. var.); Lydaea Molina

= Kageneckia =

Genus of flowering plants

Kageneckia is a genus of flowering plant in family Rosaceae.

== Taxonomic history ==
Kageneckia, along with Vauquelinia and Lindleya were formerly placed in family Quillajaceae. It shares a base chromosome number of 17 with the pome-fruited members of tribe Maleae within the Rosaceae, but its fruit are dry and dehiscent.

== Species ==
As of January 2023, Plants of the World Online accepted the following species:

- Kageneckia angustifolia, D. Don
- Kageneckia lanceolata, Ruiz & Pav.
- Kageneckia oblonga, Ruiz & Pav.
