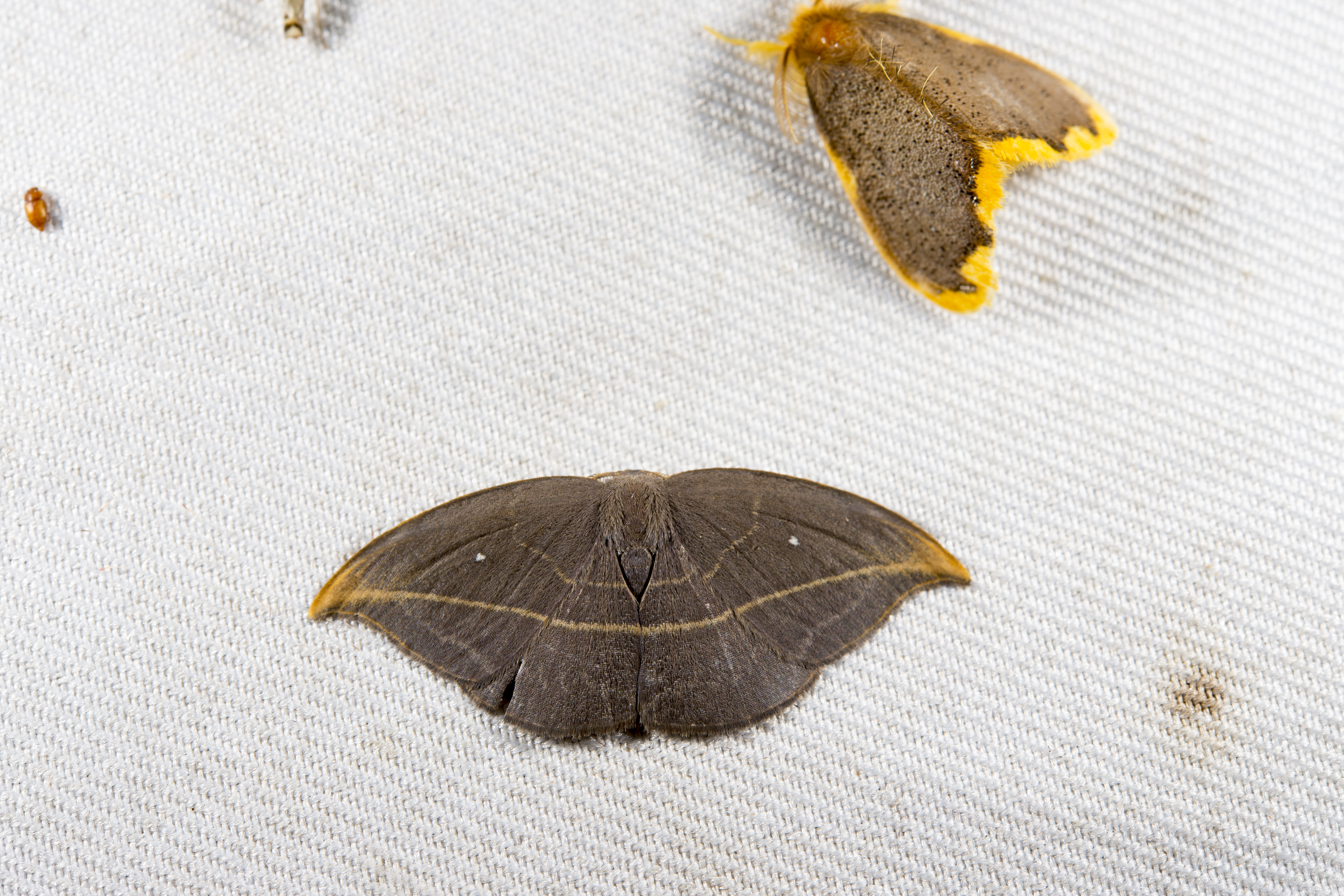

Scientific classification
- Domain: Eukaryota
- Kingdom: Animalia
- Phylum: Arthropoda
- Class: Insecta
- Order: Lepidoptera
- Family: Drepanidae
- Genus: Microblepsis
- Species: M. rugosa

Binomial name
- Microblepsis rugosa (Watson, 1968)

Synonyms
- Betalbara rugosa Watson, 1968

= Microblepsis rugosa =

Species of hook-tip moth

Microblepsis rugosa is a moth in the family Drepanidae. It was described by Watson in 1968. It is found in the Naga Hills of north-eastern India and in Malaysia.

The length of the forewings is 12–18 mm.
