= Stranvaesia lasiogyna =

Conservation status
- Vulnerable (IUCN 2.3)

Scientific classification
- Kingdom: Plantae
- Clade: Tracheophytes
- Clade: Angiosperms
- Clade: Eudicots
- Clade: Rosids
- Order: Rosales
- Family: Rosaceae
- Genus: Stranvaesia
- Species: S. lasiogyna

Binomial name
- Stranvaesia lasiogyna (Franch.) B.B.Liu

Synonyms
- Eriobotrya lasiogyna Franch. (1890) (basionym); Photinia lasiogyna (Franch.) C.K.Schneid.; Photinia lasiogyna var. glabrescens L.T.Lu & C.L.Li; Photinia mairei H.Lév.; Pyrus avalon M.F.Fay & Christenh.; Stranvaesia glaucescens var. yunnanensis Franch.; Stranvaesia lasiogyna var. glabrescens (L.T.Lu & C.L.Li) B.B.Liu

Species of flowering plant

Stranvaesia lasiogyna is a species of flowering plant in the family Rosaceae. It is a shrub or tree endemic to southern China. It is threatened by habitat loss.
