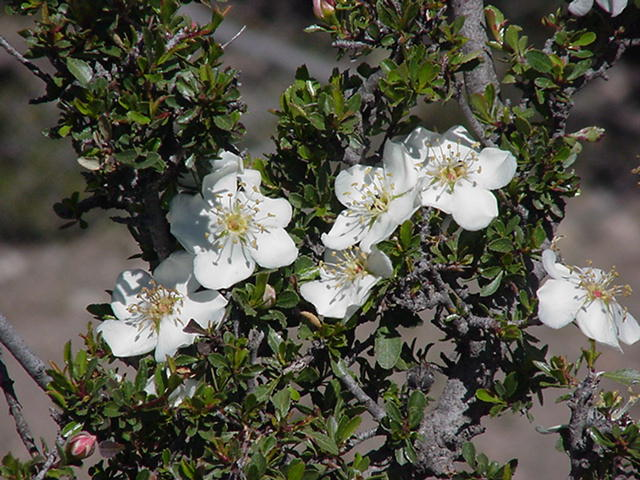
- Lindleya mespiloides

Scientific classification
- Kingdom: Plantae
- Clade: Tracheophytes
- Clade: Angiosperms
- Clade: Eudicots
- Clade: Rosids
- Order: Rosales
- Family: Rosaceae
- Tribe: Maleae
- Subtribe: Lindleyinae; Reveal

Genera
- Kageneckia; Lindleya

= Lindleyinae =

Subtribe of plants

Lindleyinae is an subtribe within the family Rosaceae, belonging to the tribe Maleae. It consists of small trees and woody shrubs. Its range stretches from South America to Central America.
