= Microblepsis rectilinea =

Scientific classification
- Domain: Eukaryota
- Kingdom: Animalia
- Phylum: Arthropoda
- Class: Insecta
- Order: Lepidoptera
- Family: Drepanidae
- Genus: Microblepsis
- Species: M. rectilinea

Binomial name
- Microblepsis rectilinea (Watson, 1968)

Synonyms
- Betalbara rectilinea Watson, 1968

Species of hook-tip moth

Microblepsis rectilinea is a moth in the family Drepanidae. It was described by Watson in 1968. It is found in Sichuan, China.

The length of the forewings is 12–13.5 mm for males and 12–14 mm for females. The ground colour of both wings is grey brown with very pale brown markings.
