= Microblepsis robusta =

Scientific classification
- Domain: Eukaryota
- Kingdom: Animalia
- Phylum: Arthropoda
- Class: Insecta
- Order: Lepidoptera
- Family: Drepanidae
- Genus: Microblepsis
- Species: M. robusta

Binomial name
- Microblepsis robusta (Oberthür, 1916)

Synonyms
- Drepana robusta Oberthür, 1916

Species of hook-tip moth

Microblepsis robusta is a moth in the family Drepanidae. It was described by Oberthür in 1916. It is found in the Chinese provinces of Sichuan and Shaanxi.

The length of the forewings is about 22.5 mm for males and 22–26 mm for females.
