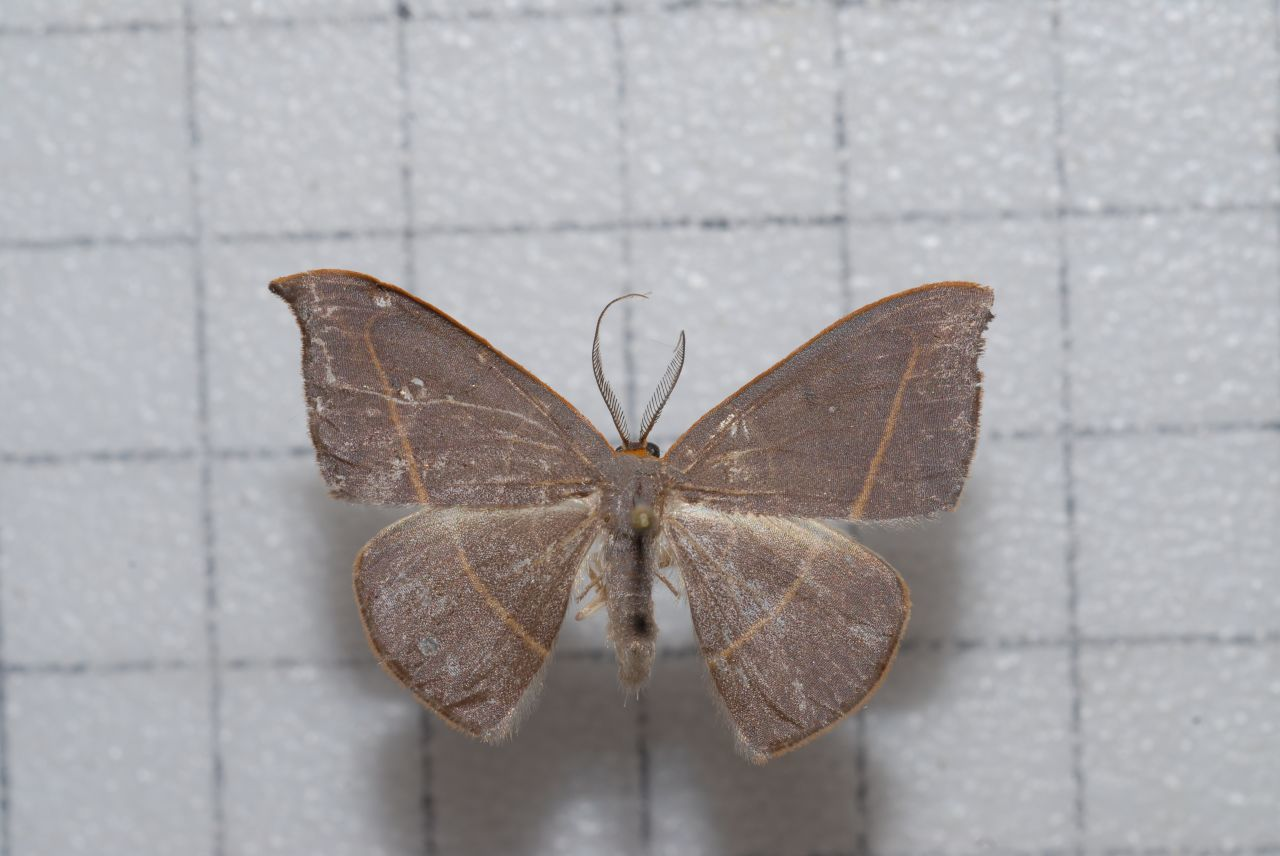
- Male
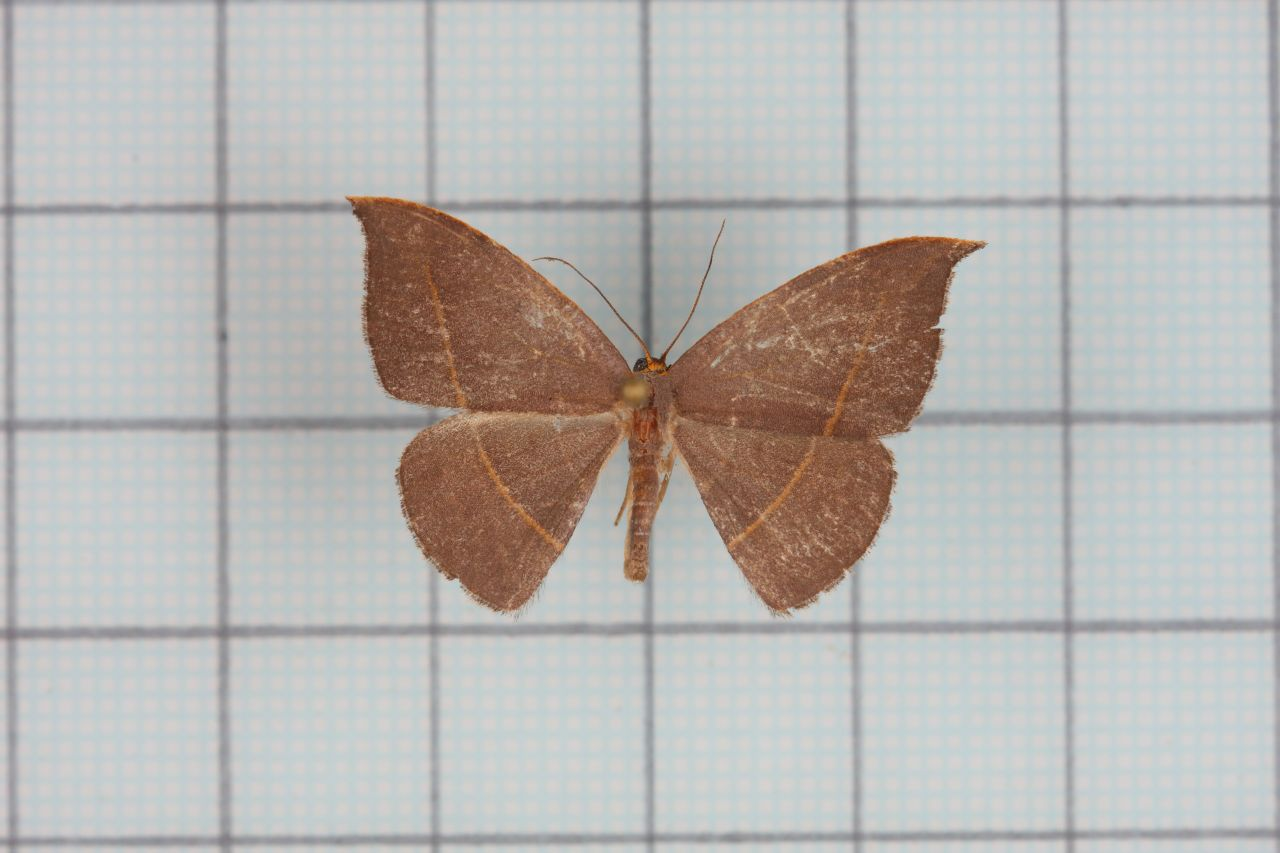
- Female

Scientific classification
- Domain: Eukaryota
- Kingdom: Animalia
- Phylum: Arthropoda
- Class: Insecta
- Order: Lepidoptera
- Family: Drepanidae
- Genus: Microblepsis
- Species: M. violacea

Binomial name
- Microblepsis violacea (Butler, 1889)

Synonyms
- Agnidra violacea Butler, 1889; Drepana violacea; Albara violacea; Albara takasago Okano, 1959

= Microblepsis violacea =

Species of hook-tip moth

Microblepsis violacea is a moth in the family Drepanidae first described by Arthur Gardiner Butler in 1889. It is found in north-western and north-eastern India, Taiwan and China (Sichuan, Yunnan, Guangdong, Zhejiang, Fujian).

The wingspan is 25–36 mm.:

The larvae feed on the leaves of Castanopsis formosana.
