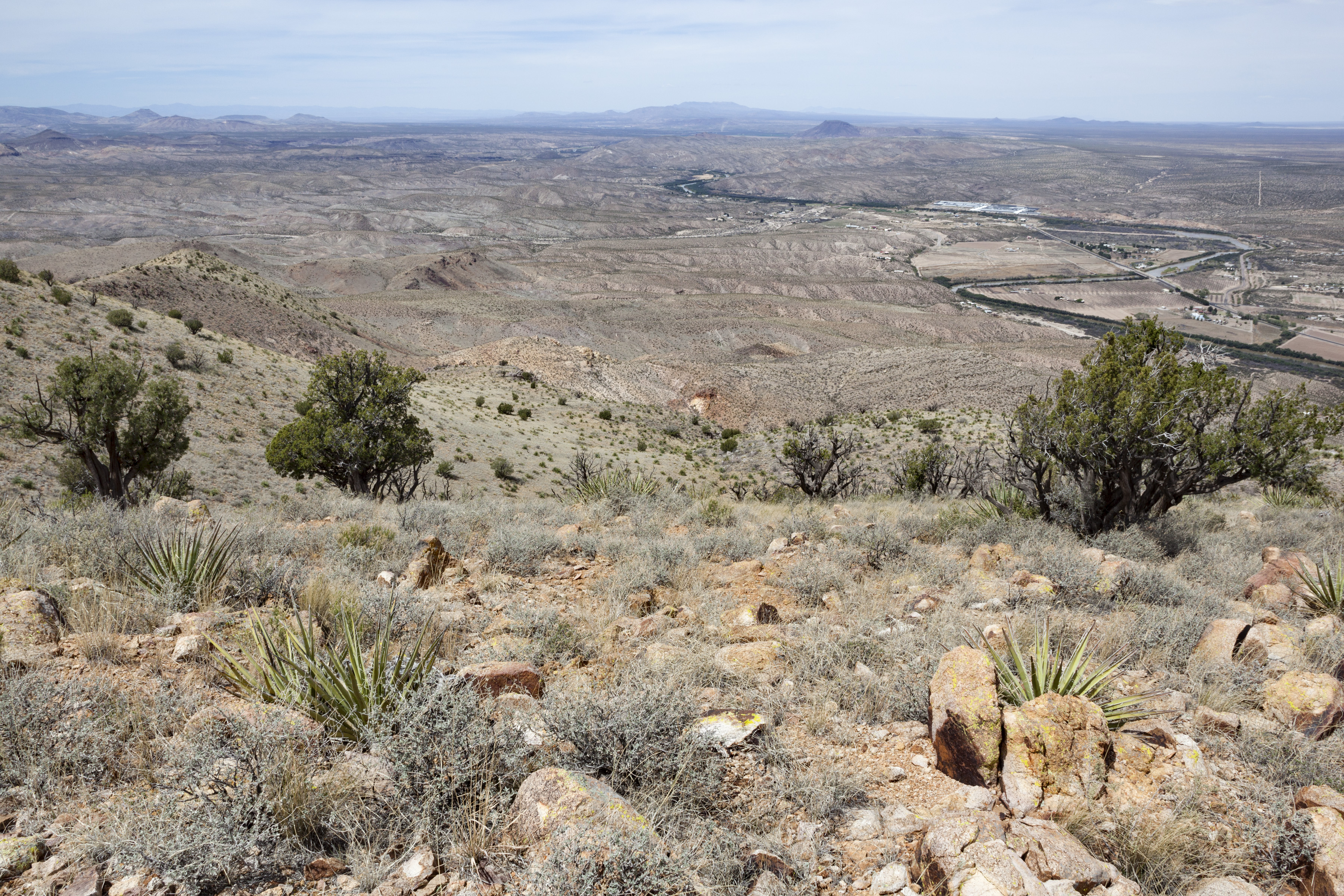
- Habitat

Scientific classification
- Kingdom: Plantae
- Clade: Embryophytes
- Clade: Tracheophytes
- Clade: Spermatophytes
- Clade: Gymnosperms
- Division: Pinophyta
- Class: Pinopsida
- Order: Cupressales
- Family: Cupressaceae
- Genus: Juniperus
- Species: J. arizonica

Binomial name
- Juniperus arizonica (R.P.Adams) R.P.Adams
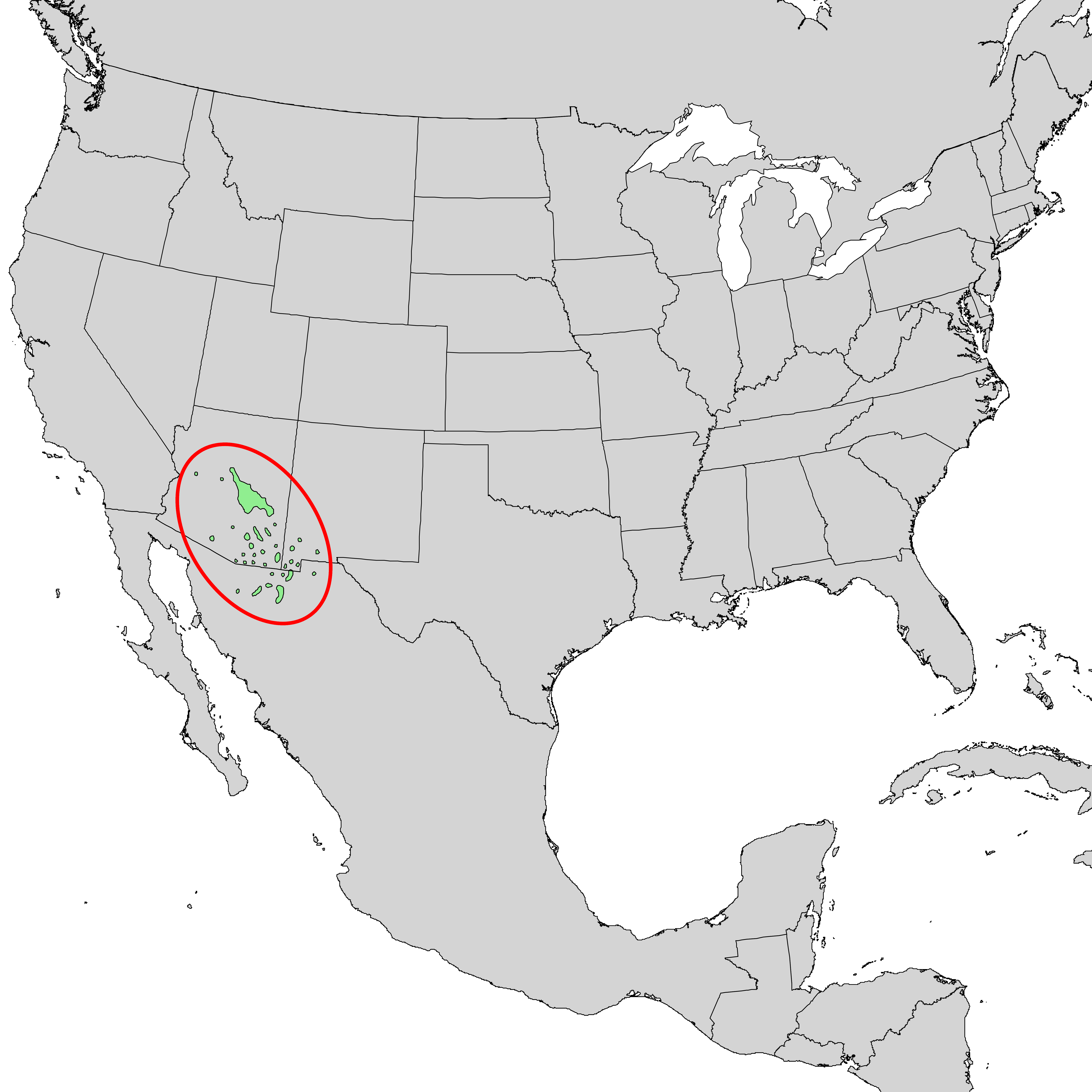
- Natural range
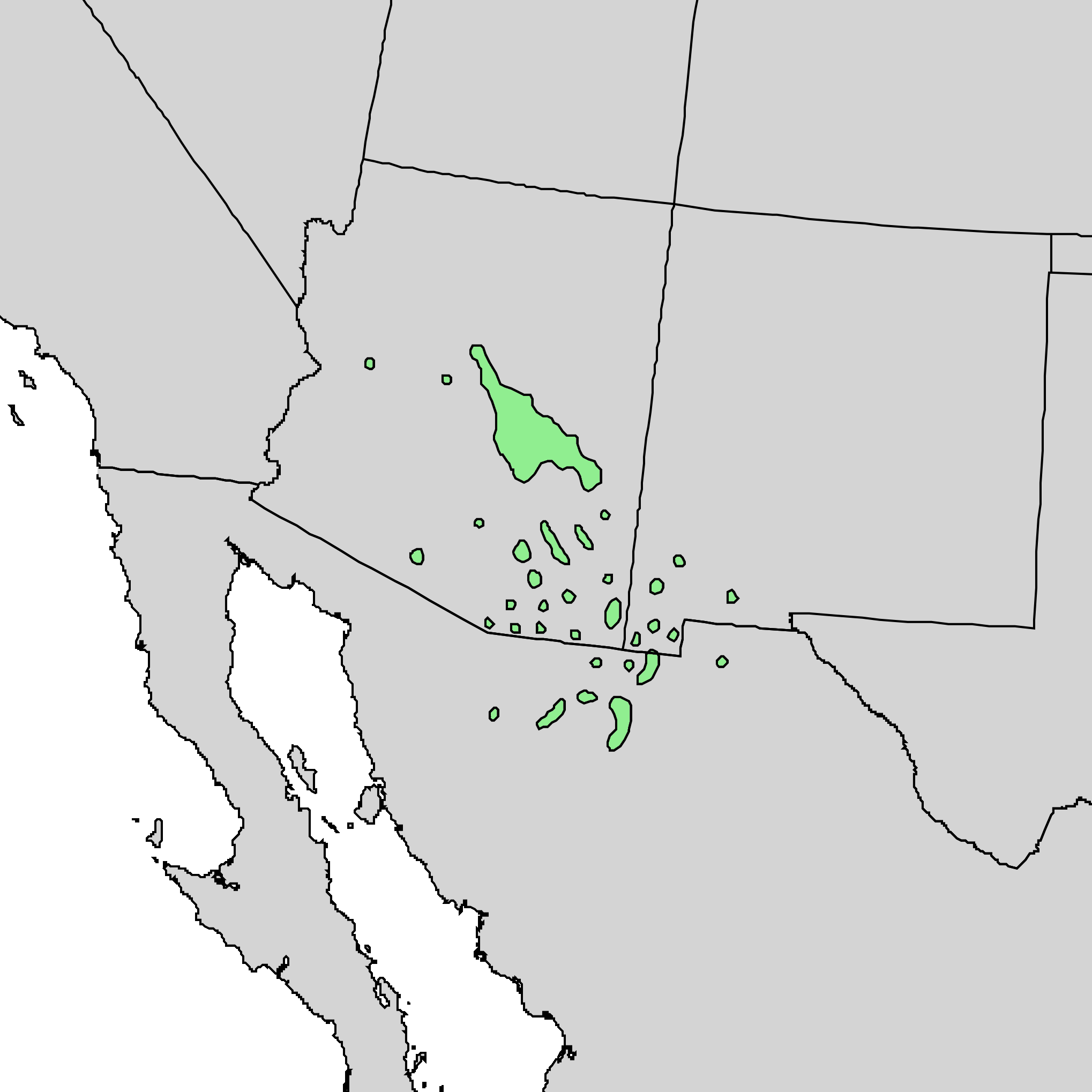
- Closeup view of range

Synonyms
- Juniperus coahuilensis var. arizonica R.P.Adams; Juniperus coahuilensis subsp. arizonica (R.P.Adams) Silba

= Juniperus arizonica =

Species of plant

Juniperus arizonica, the Arizona juniper, is a species of conifer in the family Cupressaceae, native to the Sonoran Desert of the southwestern United States and northwestern Mexico. It is a shrub or small tree, reaching 8 m (26 ft).
