= Pourthiaea amphidoxa =

Scientific classification
- Kingdom: Plantae
- Clade: Tracheophytes
- Clade: Angiosperms
- Clade: Eudicots
- Clade: Rosids
- Order: Rosales
- Family: Rosaceae
- Genus: Pourthiaea
- Species: P. amphidoxa

Binomial name
- Pourthiaea amphidoxa (C.K.Schneid.) Stapf

Varieties
- Pourthiaea amphidoxa var. amphidoxa; Pourthiaea amphidoxa var. amphileia (Hand.-Mazz.) B.B.Liu & J.Wen

Synonyms
- Photinia amphidoxa (C.K.Schneid.) Rehder & E.H.Wilson; Pyrus amphidoxa (C.K.Schneid.) Stapf; Stranvaesia amphidoxa C.K.Schneid.

Species of flowering plant

Pourthiaea amphidoxa is a species of flowering plant in the family Rosaceae. It is a shrub or tree native to southern China.

Two varieties are accepted:

- Pourthiaea amphidoxa var. amphidoxa (synonyms Photinia amphidoxa var. kwangsiensis F.P.Metcalf, P. amphidoxa var. stylosa Cardot, Pyrus feddei H.Lév., Stranvaesia rosthornii C.K.Schneid.) – southern China
- Pourthiaea amphidoxa var. amphileia (Hand.-Mazz.) B.B.Liu & J.Wen (Photinia amphidoxa var. amphileia Hand.-Mazz., Stranvaesia amphidoxa var. amphileia (Hand.-Mazz.) T.T.Yu) – southern China (Guizhou, Guangxi, and Hunan)
