= Pourthiaea tomentosa =

Scientific classification
- Kingdom: Plantae
- Clade: Tracheophytes
- Clade: Angiosperms
- Clade: Eudicots
- Clade: Rosids
- Order: Rosales
- Family: Rosaceae
- Genus: Pourthiaea
- Species: P. tomentosa

Binomial name
- Pourthiaea tomentosa (T.T.Yu & T.C.Ku) B.B.Liu & J.Wen

Synonyms
- Pyrus ganymedes M.F.Fay & Christenh.; Stranvaesia tomentosa T.T.Yu & T.C.Ku

Species of flowering plant

Pourthiaea tomentosa is a species of flowering plant in the family Rosaceae. It is a shrub or tree native to south-central China.
