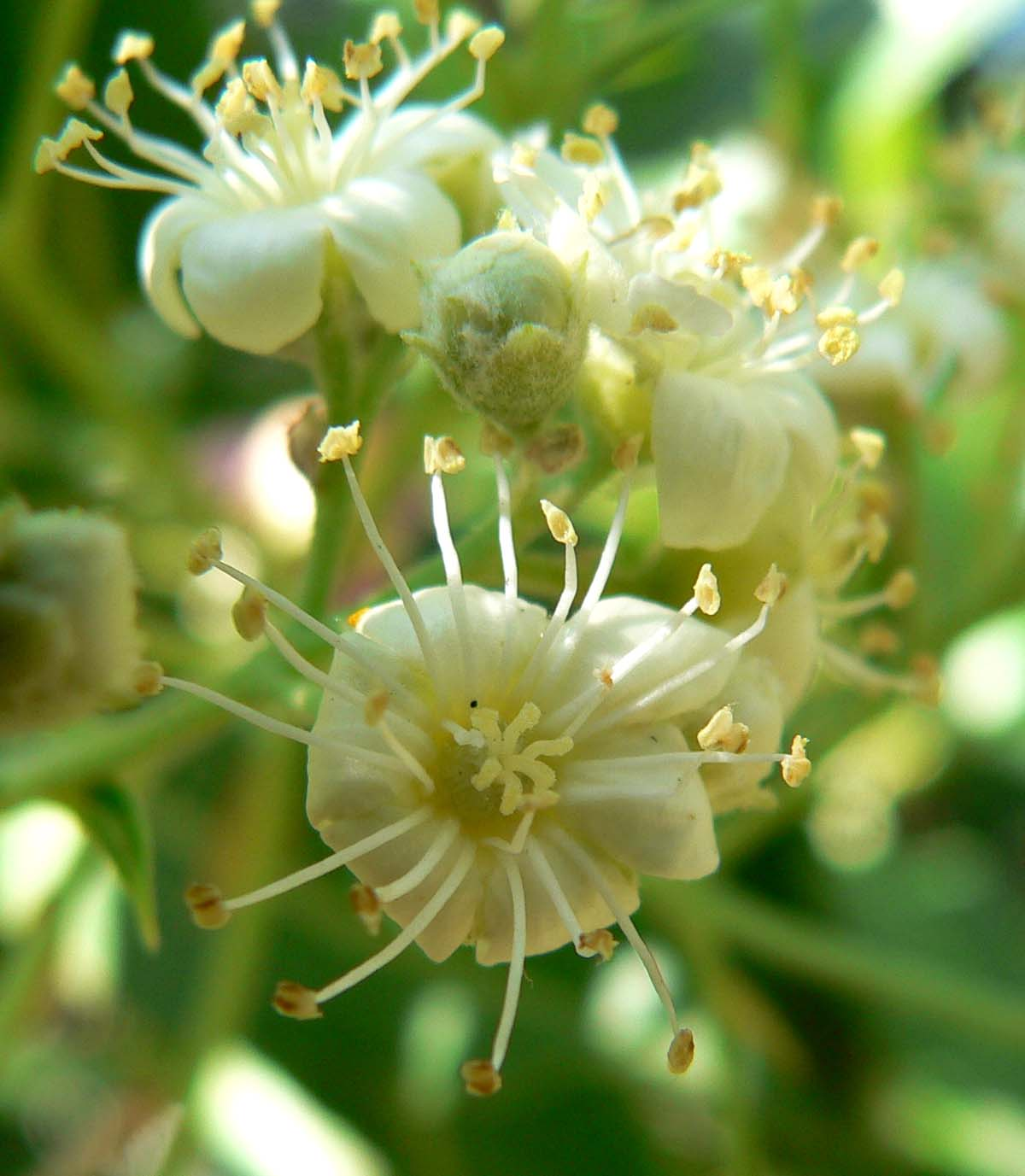
- Close-up, inflorescence
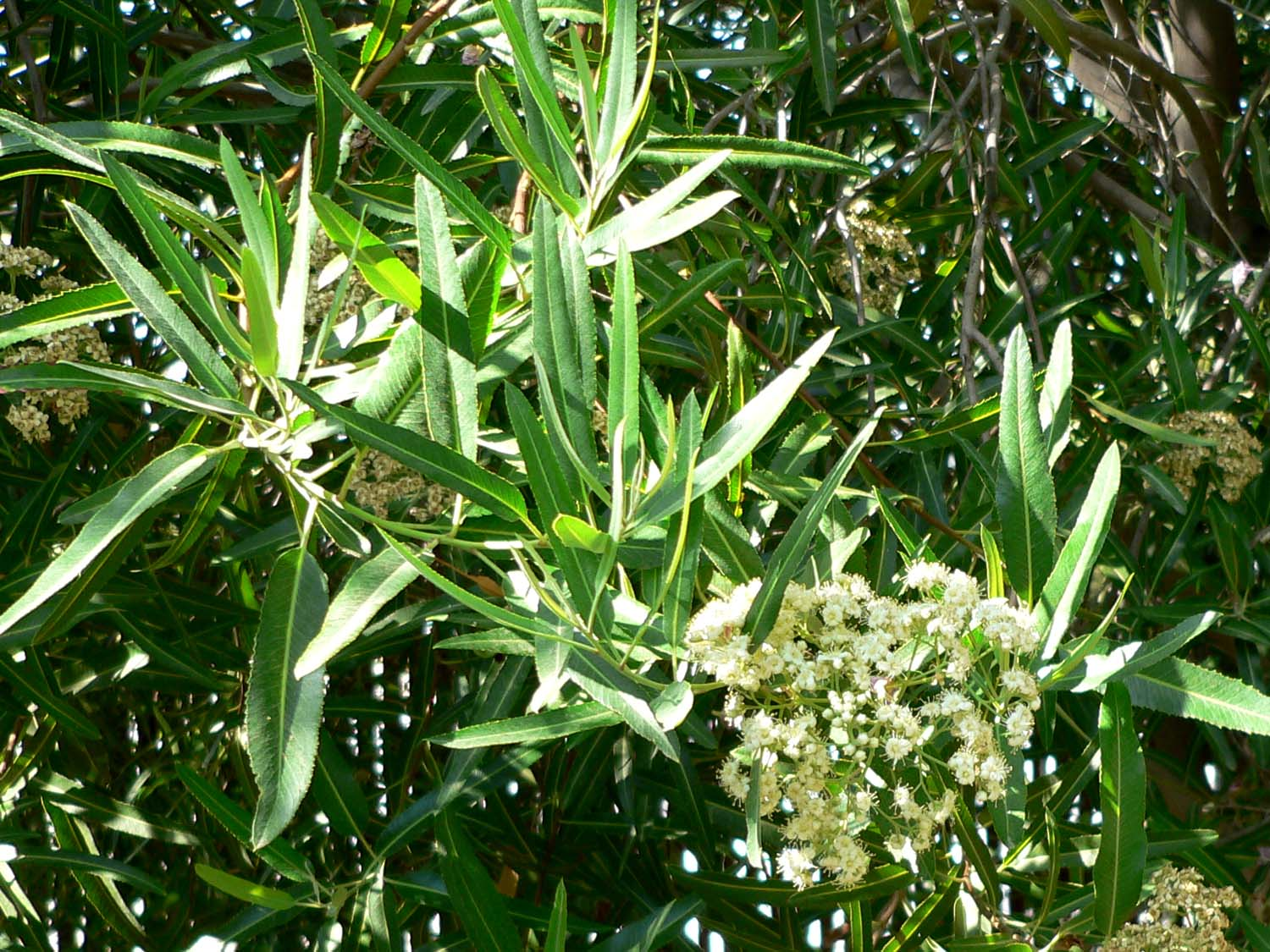
- Foliage and flowers

Scientific classification
- Kingdom: Plantae
- Clade: Tracheophytes
- Clade: Angiosperms
- Clade: Eudicots
- Clade: Rosids
- Order: Rosales
- Family: Rosaceae
- Genus: Vauquelinia
- Species: V. californica

Binomial name
- Vauquelinia californica (Torr.) Sarg.
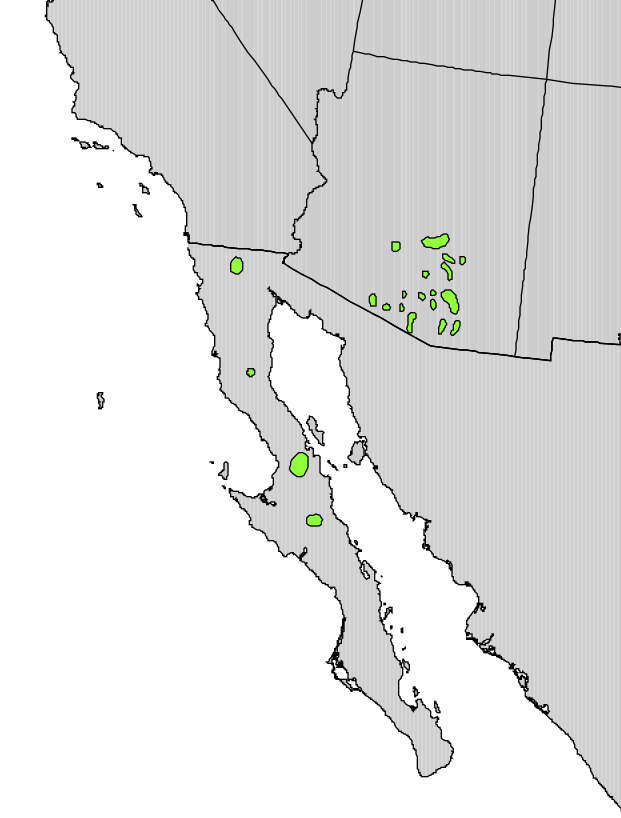
- Distribution range

= Vauquelinia californica =

Species of tree

Vauquelinia californica, commonly known as Arizona rosewood, is an evergreen species of shrub or tree, in the rose family, Rosaceae.

The dark brown wood streaked with red, and is hard and very heavy, a beautiful 'rosewood.' It has dense white blossoms in early Spring.

== Distribution ==
The plant is native to the Southwestern United States in Arizona and southwestern New Mexico in Madrean Sky Islands habitats, the Peninsular Ranges in Baja California and northern Baja California Sur, and Sonora in Northwestern Mexico.

=== Prehistoric ===
From pollen core data, a portion of the prehistoric distribution of Vauquelinia californica has been mapped. For example, in the Late Wisconsin period, this species occurred at lower elevations within the Waterman Mountains in southern Arizona than currently found.

== Cultivation ==
Vauquelinia californica is cultivated as an ornamental plant. It is used as a drought-tolerant shrub, hedge, or small tree. When trained as a single trunked tree, growth can be to 15 feet (4.6 m) in height.

== Ecology ==
Vauquelinia californica is a larval host for the two-tailed swallowtail.
