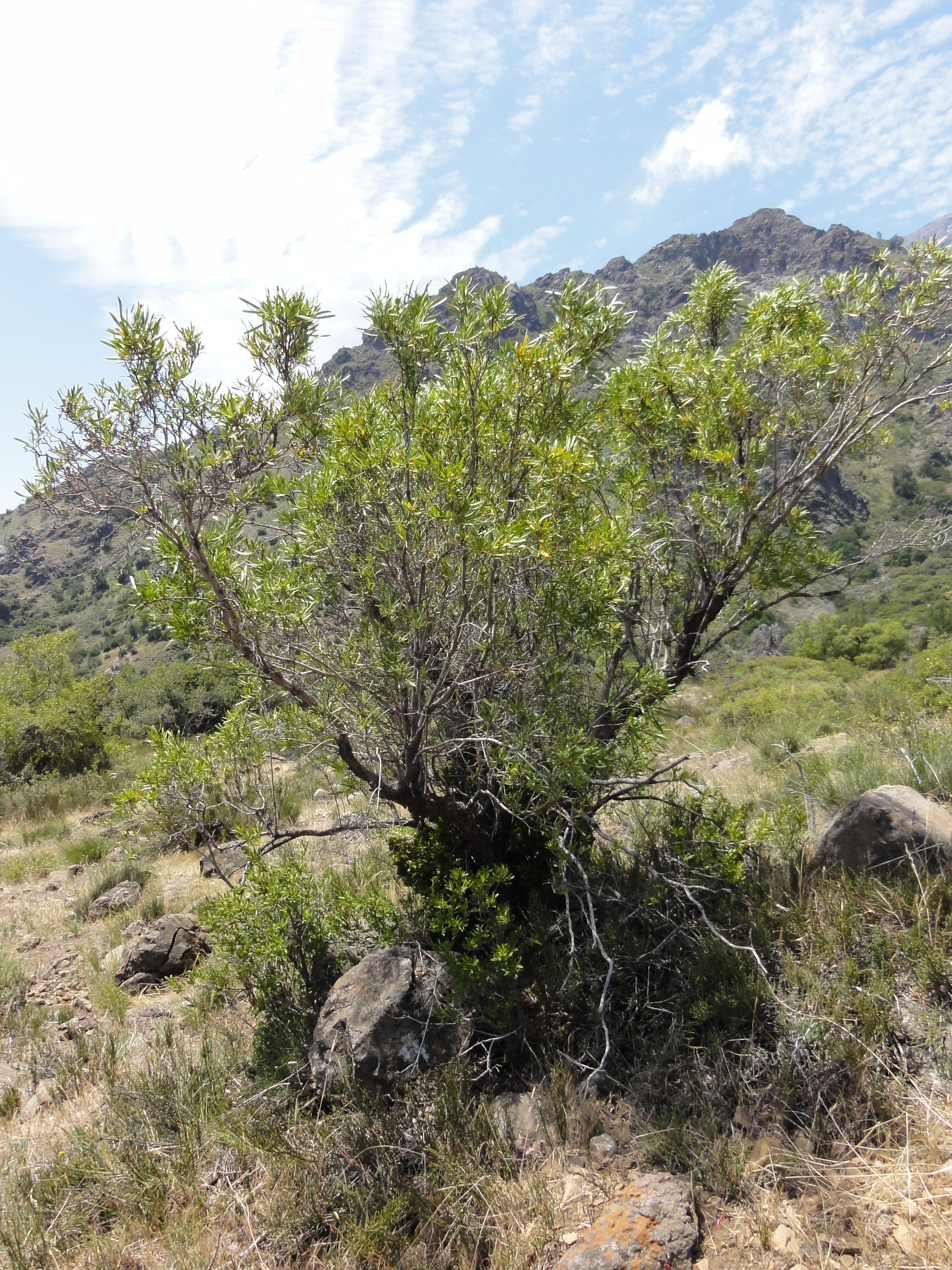

Scientific classification
- Kingdom: Plantae
- Clade: Tracheophytes
- Clade: Angiosperms
- Clade: Eudicots
- Clade: Rosids
- Order: Rosales
- Family: Rosaceae
- Genus: Kageneckia
- Species: K. angustifolia

Binomial name
- Kageneckia angustifolia D.Don

= Kageneckia angustifolia =

Species of plant

Kageneckia angustifolia (also known as frangel) is a species of plant in the family Rosaceae. It is endemic to Chile. It grows from Limari to Talca (30 to 35°S) in the Chilean Coast Range and in the Andes.

== Description ==
It is an evergreen small tree or shrub that measures up to 5 m (16 ft) tall, the bark is greyish-brown and sheds in longitudinal strips. Leaves are alternate, very leathery, with toothed edge and linear shape, the leaves are petiolate, glossy light-green about 9 cm long. The flowers are unisexual star-shaped and white, solitary or clustered in axillary inflorescences. The calyx is formed by 5 sepals, the corolla is made up by 5 petals. The male ones have 15 stamens. The fruit is a pentamerous star-shaped capsule, about 2–3 cm in diameter. The seeds are winged.

== Uses ==
The wood is used for elaborating coal.

== Etymology ==
Kageneckia in honour of Frederick von Kageneck, Austrian ambassador to Madrid.
