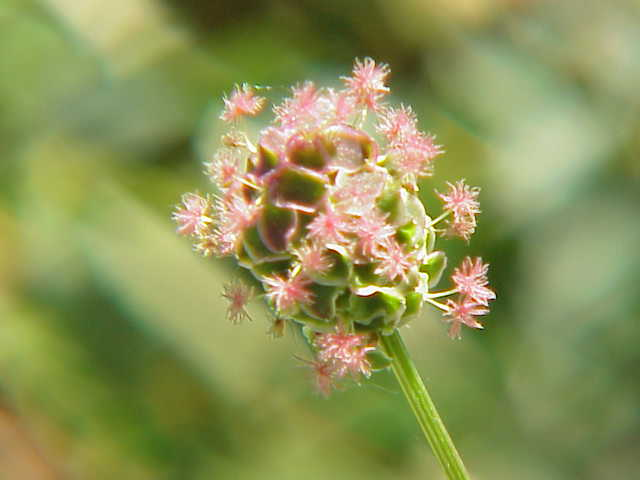
- Sanguisorba minor

Scientific classification
- Kingdom: Plantae
- Clade: Tracheophytes
- Clade: Angiosperms
- Clade: Eudicots
- Clade: Rosids
- Order: Rosales
- Family: Rosaceae
- Subfamily: Rosoideae
- Tribe: Sanguisorbeae
- Subtribe: Sanguisorbinae; Torr. & A.Gray

Genera
- Acaena; Bencomia; Cliffortia; Dendriopoterium; Marcetella; Margyricarpus; Polylepis; Poterium; Sanguisorba; Sarcopoterium; Tetraglochin

= Sanguisorbinae =

Subtribe of flowering plants

Sanguisorbinae is a subtribe of flowering plants in the rose family, Rosaceae. It is the sister to subtribe Agrimoniinae in tribe Sanguisorbeae.
