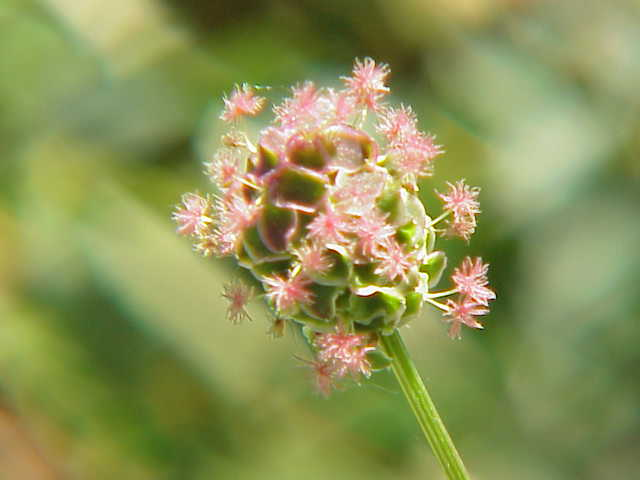
- Sanguisorba minor

Scientific classification
- Kingdom: Plantae
- Clade: Tracheophytes
- Clade: Angiosperms
- Clade: Eudicots
- Clade: Rosids
- Order: Rosales
- Family: Rosaceae
- Subfamily: Rosoideae
- Tribe: Sanguisorbeae; DC. 1825

Subtribes and genera
- Agrimoniinae; Agrimonia; Aremonia; Hagenia; Leucosidea; Spenceria; Sanguisorbinae; Acaena; Bencomia; Cliffortia; Dendriopoterium; Marcetella; Margyricarpus; Polylepis; Poterium; Sanguisorba; Sarcopoterium; Tetraglochin

Synonyms
- Agrimonieae Lam. & DC. 1806; Poterieae Dumort. 1827

= Sanguisorbeae =

Tribe of flowering plants

Sanguisorbeae is a tribe of the rose family, Rosaceae. It contains 16 genera in two subtribes, Agrimoniinae and Sanguisorbinae.
