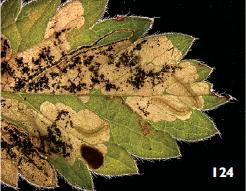
- Final instar larvae and cocoons on Agrimonia eupatoria

Scientific classification
- Kingdom: Animalia
- Phylum: Arthropoda
- Class: Insecta
- Order: Lepidoptera
- Family: Nepticulidae
- Genus: Ectoedemia
- Species: E. agrimoniae

Binomial name
- Ectoedemia agrimoniae (Frey, 1858)

Synonyms
- Nepticula agrimoniae Frey, 1858; Nepticula agrimoniella Herrich-Schaffer, 1860

= Ectoedemia agrimoniae =

Species of moth

Ectoedemia agrimoniae is a moth of the family Nepticulidae. It is found from Fennoscandia to the Pyrenees, Italy and Greece, and from Great Britain to Ukraine.

The wingspan is 4–6.4 mm. The head is ferruginous ochreous to brown, the collar dark brown. Antennal eyecaps are yellow - whitish. Forewings grey densely irrorated with blackish; a narrow curved sometimes interrupted shining white fascia in middle; outer half of cilia beyond a black line white. Hindwings light grey. Adults are on wing from May to July. There is one generation per year.

The larvae feed on Agrimonia eupatoria and Aremonia agrimonoides. They mine the leaves of their host plant.
