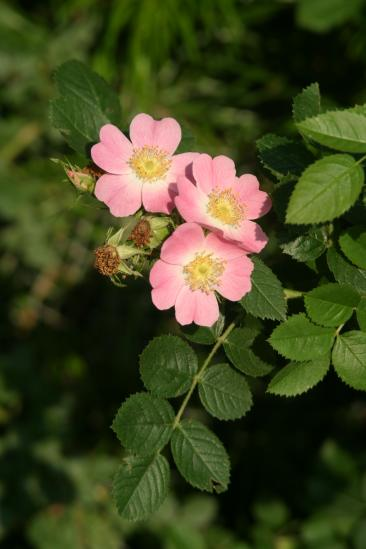
- Rosa rubiginosa, eglantine rose

Scientific classification
- Kingdom: Plantae
- Clade: Tracheophytes
- Clade: Angiosperms
- Clade: Eudicots
- Clade: Rosids
- Order: Rosales
- Family: Rosaceae
- Subfamily: Rosoideae; Juss. ex Arn.

Tribes
- Colurieae; Potentilleae; Roseae; Rubeae; Sanguisorbeae; Ulmarieae

= Rosoideae =

Subfamily of flowering plants

The rose subfamily Rosoideae consists of more than 850 species, including many shrubs, perennial herbs, and fruit plants such as strawberries and brambles. Only a few are annual herbs.

The circumscription of the Rosoideae is still not wholly certain; recent genetic research has resulted in several changes at the genus level and the removal from Rosoideae of some genera (notably Cercocarpus, Cowania, Dryas and Purshia) previously included in the subfamily.

== Genera ==
- Acaena – bidibidis
- Agrimonia – agrimonies
- Alchemilla – lady's mantles
- Aphanes – parsley-pierts (sometimes in Alchemilla)
- Aremonia
- Argentina – silverweeds (sometimes in Potentilla)
- Bencomia
- Chamaerhodos Bunge – little-rose
- Cliffortia
- Coluria
- Comarum (formerly in Potentilla)
- Dasiphora – woody cinquefoils (formerly in Potentilla)
- Dendriopoterium (currently in Sanguisorba)
- Drymocallis – sticky cinquefoils (formerly in Potentilla)
- Fallugia
- Filipendula
- Fragaria – strawberries
- Geum – avenses
- Hagenia – African redwood
- Leucosidea – oldwood
- Marcetella
- Margyricarpus – pearlfruit
- Polylepis
- Potaninia
- Potentilla – typical cinquefoils
- Poteridium
- Poterium
- Purpusia (sometimes in Potentilla)
- Rosa – roses
- Rubus – brambles and raspberries
- Sanguisorba – burnets
- Sarcopoterium
- Sibbaldia
- Sibbaldianthe
- Sibbaldiopsis – three-toothed cinquefoil (formerly in Potentilla)
- Sieversia
- Spenceria
- Tetraglochin
- Waldsteinia (sometimes in Geum)
