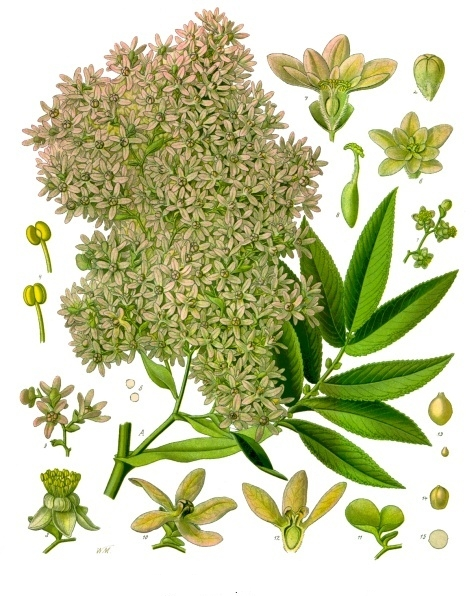

Conservation status
- Least Concern (IUCN 3.1)

Scientific classification
- Kingdom: Plantae
- Clade: Tracheophytes
- Clade: Angiosperms
- Clade: Eudicots
- Clade: Rosids
- Order: Rosales
- Family: Rosaceae
- Subfamily: Rosoideae
- Tribe: Sanguisorbeae
- Subtribe: Agrimoniinae
- Genus: Hagenia; J.F.Gmel.
- Species: H. abyssinica

Binomial name
- Hagenia abyssinica Willd.

= Hagenia =

Genus of trees

Hagenia is a monotypic genus of flowering plant with the sole species Hagenia abyssinica, native to the high-elevation Afromontane regions of central and eastern Africa. It also has a disjunct distribution in the high mountains of East Africa from Sudan and Ethiopia in the north, through Kenya, Uganda, Rwanda, Burundi, Democratic Republic of Congo, and Tanzania, to Malawi and Zambia in the south. A member of the rose family, its closest relative is the Afromontane genus Leucosidea.

== Description ==
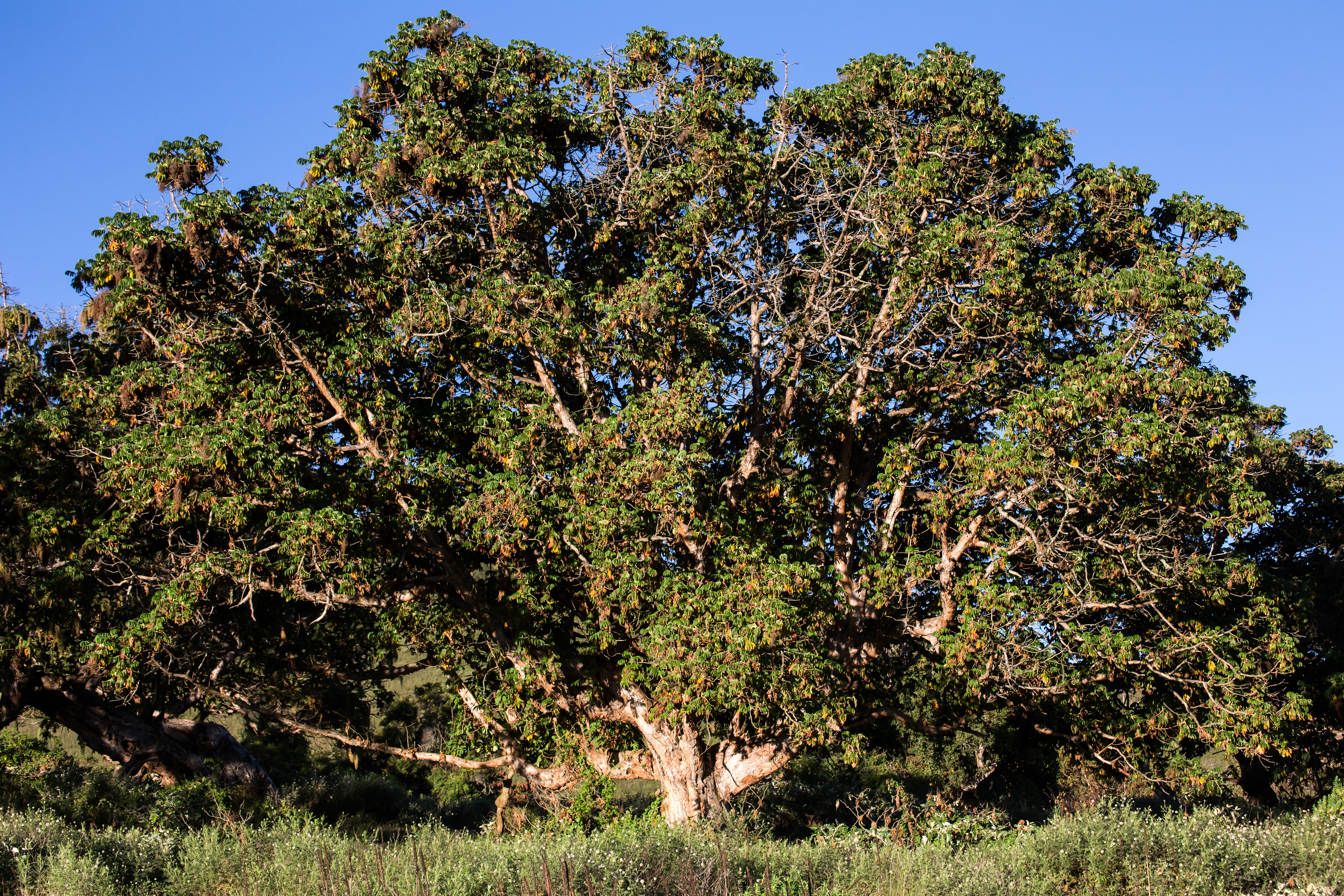
A Hagenia plant in the Rwenzori Mountains National Park in Uganda

It is a tree up to 20 m in height, with a short trunk, thick branches, and thick, peeling bark. The leaves are up to 40 cm long, compound with 7-13 leaflets, each leaflet about 10 cm long with a finely serrated margin, green above, silvery-haired below. The flowers are white to orange-buff or pinkish-red, produced in panicles 30–60 cm long.

== Nomenclature ==
It is known in English as African redwood, East African rosewood, brayera, cusso, hagenia, or kousso, in Amharic as kosso, and in Swahili as mdobore or mlozilozi. Synonyms of the species include Banksia abyssinica, Brayera anthelmintica, Hagenia abyssinica var. viridifolia and Hagenia anthelmintica.

== Distribution and habitat ==
It is generally found from 2000 to 3000 m elevation, in areas receiving 1000–1500 mm of rainfall annually. It can be found growing in mixed afromontane forest with Podocarpus, Afrocarpus, and other trees, and in drier afromontane forests and woodlands where Hagenia is dominant, or in mixed stands of Hagenia and Juniperus procera. It is often found near the upper limit of forest growth, giving way to giant heather zones above it.

== Ecology ==
Hagenia is used as a food plant by the larvae of some Lepidoptera species including turnip moth.

== Medical use ==
A drug obtained from the tree, known as Kousso, comprises the entire inflorescence kept in form by a band wound transversely round it. The active principle is koussin or kosin, C_{31}H_{38}O_{10}, which is soluble in alcohol and alkalis, and may be given directly in doses or in an infusion of the coarsely powdered flowers. It is considered to be an effectual anthelmintic for tapeworm, Taenia solium.
