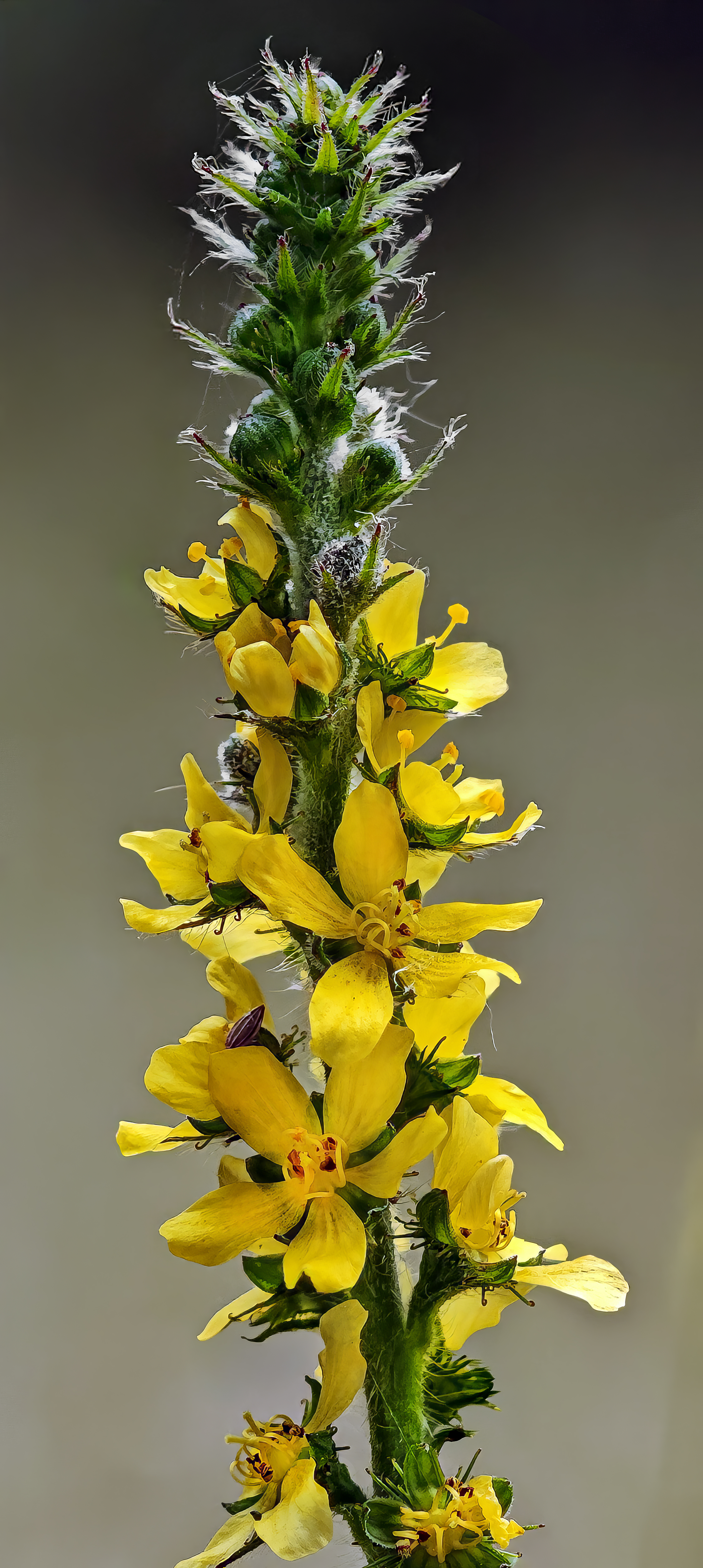
- Agrimonia eupatoria

Scientific classification
- Kingdom: Plantae
- Clade: Tracheophytes
- Clade: Angiosperms
- Clade: Eudicots
- Clade: Rosids
- Order: Rosales
- Family: Rosaceae
- Subfamily: Rosoideae
- Tribe: Sanguisorbeae
- Subtribe: Agrimoniinae; J.Presl

Genera
- Agrimonia; Aremonia; Hagenia; Leucosidea; Spenceria

= Agrimoniinae =

Subtribe of flowering plants

Agrimoniinae is a subtribe of the rose family, Rosaceae. It is the sister to subtribe Sanguisorbinae in tribe Sanguisorbeae. It includes the Afromontane endemics Hagenia and Leucosidea.
