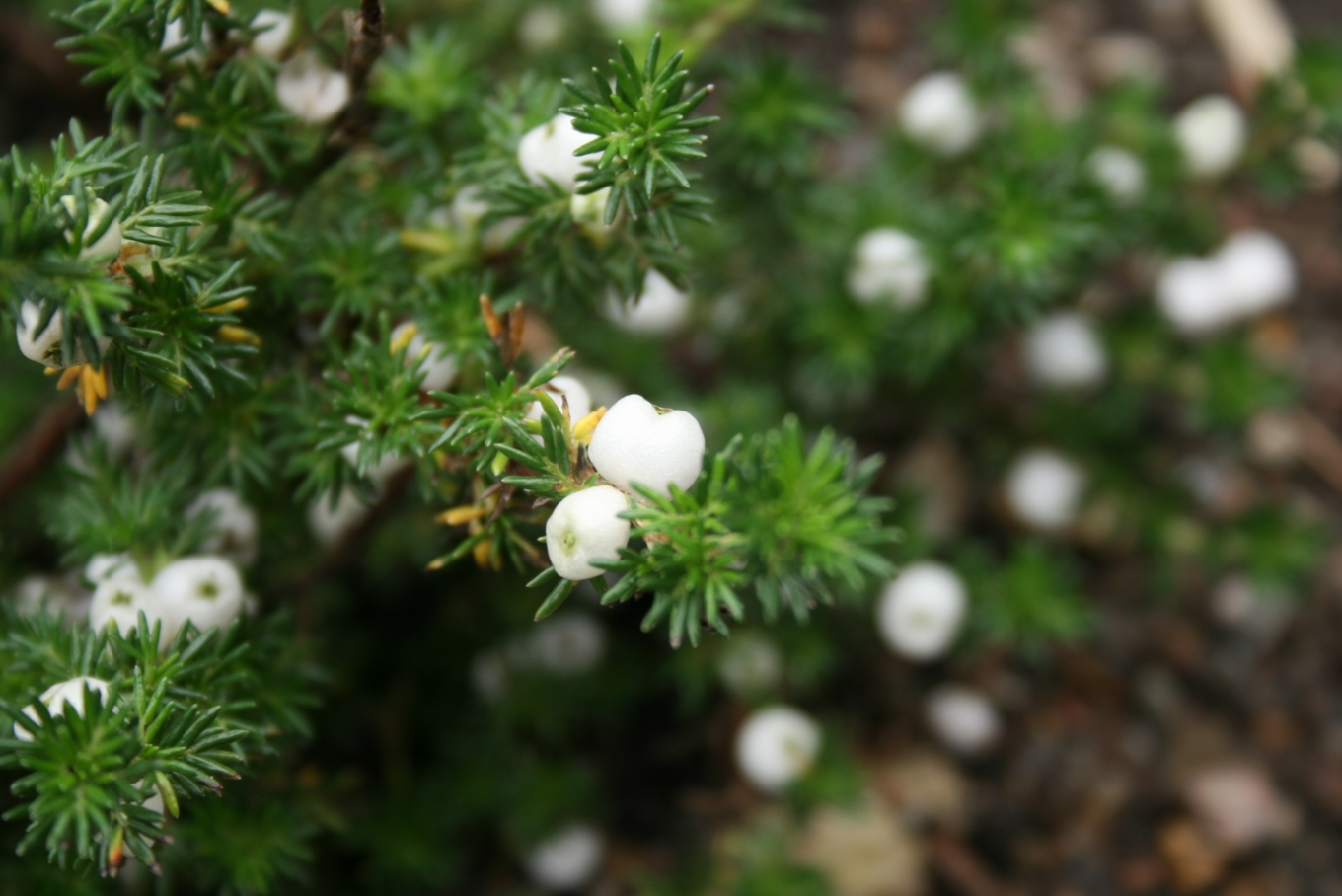

Scientific classification
- Kingdom: Plantae
- Clade: Tracheophytes
- Clade: Angiosperms
- Clade: Eudicots
- Clade: Rosids
- Order: Rosales
- Family: Rosaceae
- Genus: Margyricarpus
- Species: M. pinnatus

Binomial name
- Margyricarpus pinnatus (Lam.) Kuntze

Synonyms
- Empetrum pinnatum Lam.; Ancistrum barbatum Lam.; Margyricarpus imberbis C.Presl; Margyricarpus laevis Willd.; Margyricarpus patagonicus Speg.; Margyricarpus pinnatus var. hirsutus Kuntze; Margyricarpus setosus Ruiz & Pav.; Margyricarpus setosus var. patagonicus (Speg.) Speg.; Margyricarpus setosus var. paucifoliolatus Bitter

= Margyricarpus pinnatus =

Pearlfruit

Genus of flowering plants

Margyricarpus pinnatus, commonly known as pearl-fruit, is an ornamental plant in the family Rosaceae, which is native to South America.
