= Spenceria =

Scientific classification
- Kingdom: Plantae
- Clade: Tracheophytes
- Clade: Angiosperms
- Clade: Eudicots
- Clade: Rosids
- Order: Rosales
- Family: Rosaceae
- Subfamily: Rosoideae
- Tribe: Sanguisorbeae
- Subtribe: Agrimoniinae
- Genus: Spenceria; Trimen
- Species: S. ramalana

Binomial name
- Spenceria ramalana Trimen

Varieties
- S. r. var. parviflora (Stapf) Kitam.; S. r. var. ramalana (autonym)

Genus of plants

Spenceria ramalana is the lone species in the plant genus Spenceria, known by two varieties. S. ramalana grows from 18–32 cm. tall, and puts out yellow flowers from July through August; bearing fruit (yellowish-brown achenes) from September to October. The Chinese name, ma ti huang [马蹄黄], can be translated to mean "yellow horseshoe".

== Etymology ==
Henry Trimen, both the genus, and binomial authority of Spenceria, and S. ramalana, respectively, gave an explanation of how he arrived at these names: the genus name was given in honour of Trimen's friend, and fellow botanist, Spencer Moore, who was employed at the Kew Herbarium. Trimen thought about choosing a name commemorating the collector of the species, one Captain Gill, R.E., but decided against it, as there already was a genus Gilia (Polemoniaceae), and he wished to avoid, in his words, "the formation of another of precisely similar sound." As the species was collected from a mountain named Ra-Ma-La, it is likely that the specific epithet "ramalana" was chosen as a toponym (the suffix "-ana" meaning "belonging to", hence "from Ra-Ma-La").

== Distribution ==
Spenceria ramalana is native to Bhutan and China (in the provinces of Sichuan, Tibet, and Yunnan).

== Habitat ==
Spenceria ramalana inhabits limestone soil on montane slopes and meadows (elev. 3000–5000 m.)

== Uses ==
Both varieties of S. ramalana have been used locally in traditional folk medicine.
