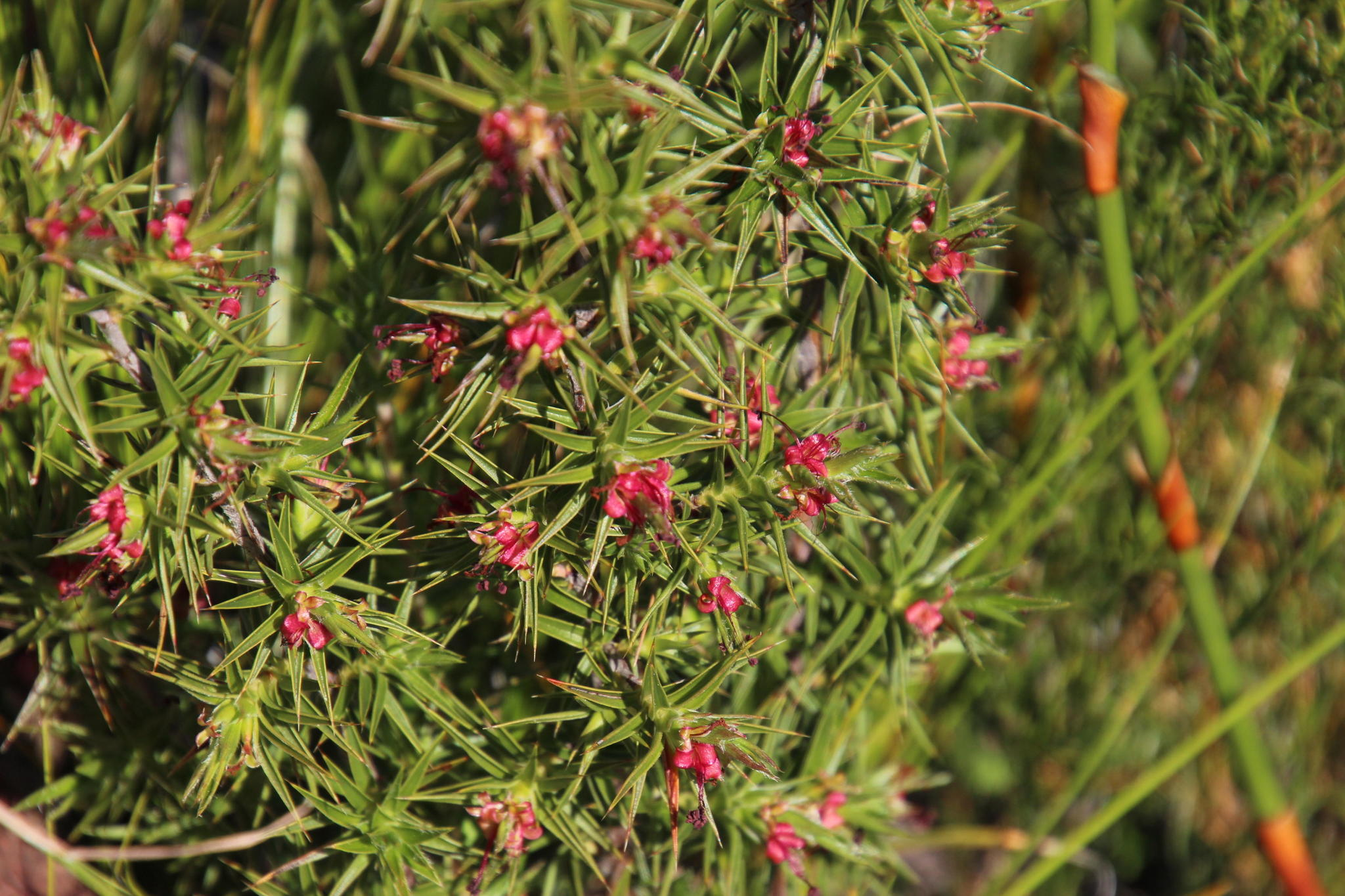
- In bloom
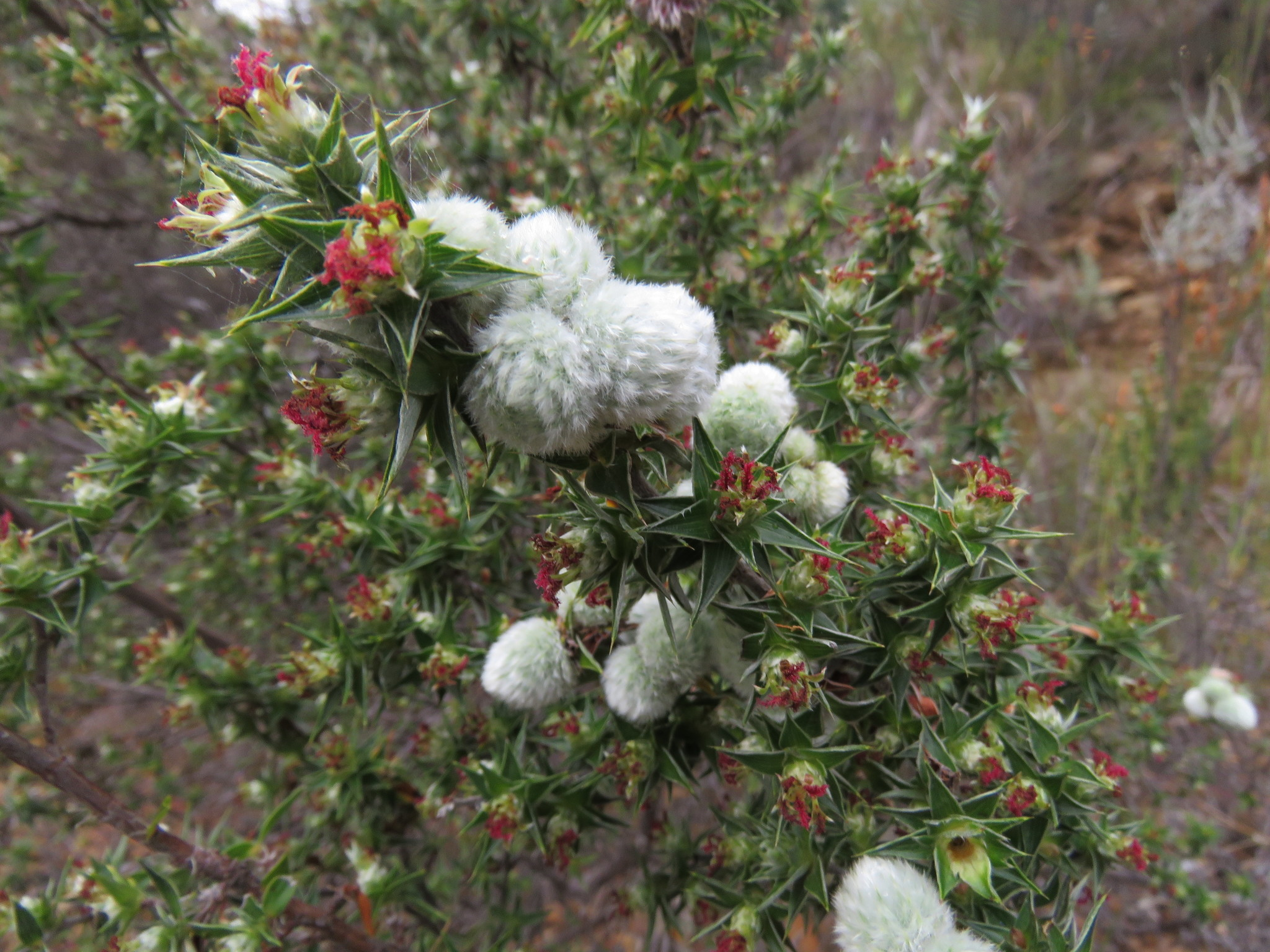
- A plant with galls

Scientific classification
- Kingdom: Plantae
- Clade: Tracheophytes
- Clade: Angiosperms
- Clade: Eudicots
- Clade: Rosids
- Order: Rosales
- Family: Rosaceae
- Genus: Cliffortia
- Species: C. ruscifolia

Binomial name
- Cliffortia ruscifolia L.

Synonyms
- Borbonia trinervia L.; Cliffortia arachnoidea G.Lodd.; Liparia hirsuta Moench

= Cliffortia ruscifolia =

Species of plant

Cliffortia ruscifolia, the climber's friend, is a widespread species of flowering plant in the family Rosaceae, native to the Cape Provinces of South Africa. A 1 to 1.5 m (3 to 5 ft) tall shrub with painfully sharp leaves, it is found growing on rocks and cliffs, and it is a pioneer species of disturbed areas. It is prone to hairy white galls of unknown cause.

== Subtaxa ==
The following varieties are accepted:

- Cliffortia ruscifolia var. purpurea Weim. – southwestern Cape Provinces
- Cliffortia ruscifolia var. ruscifolia – Cape Provinces

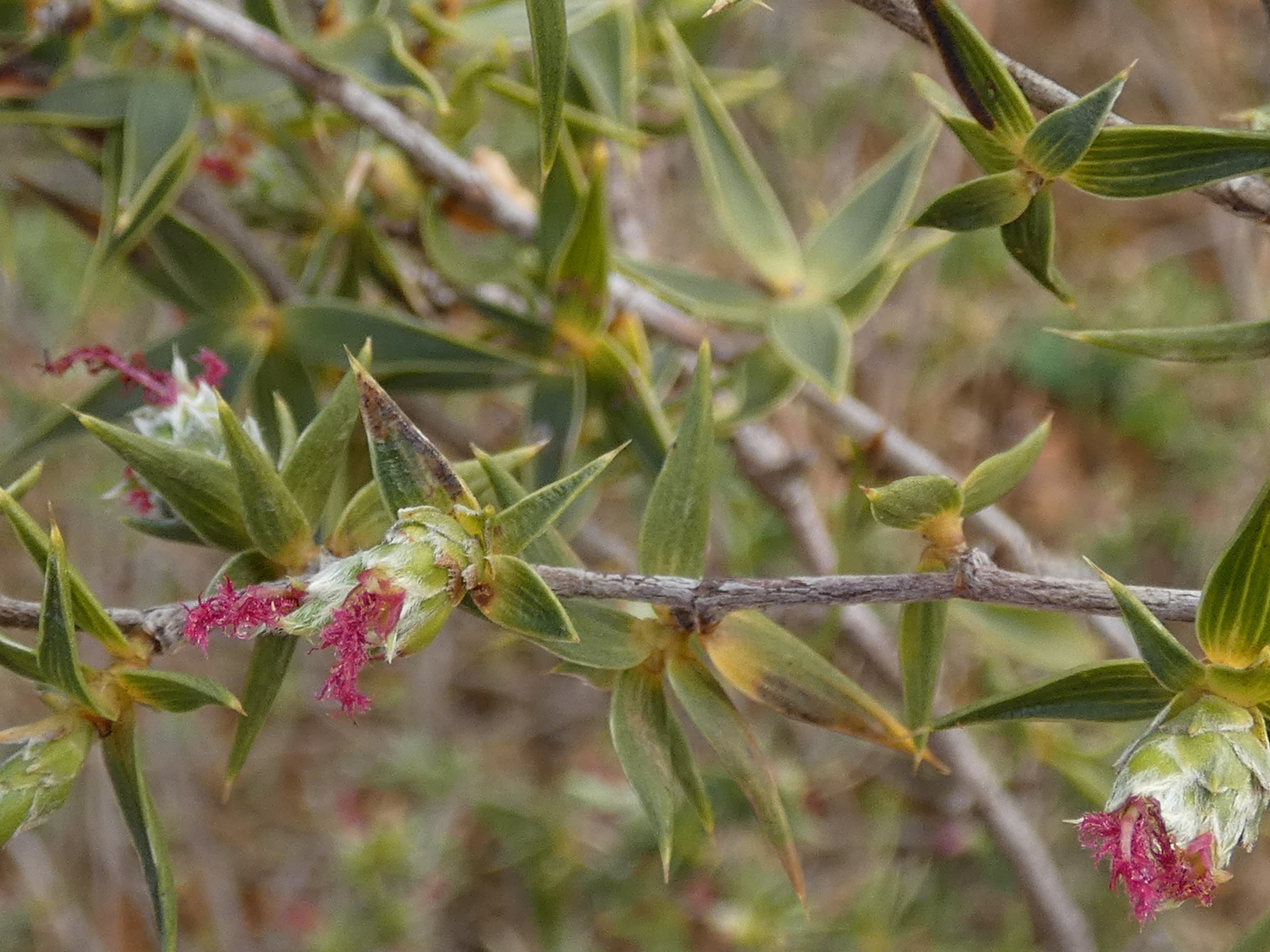
Close-up of flowering branch
