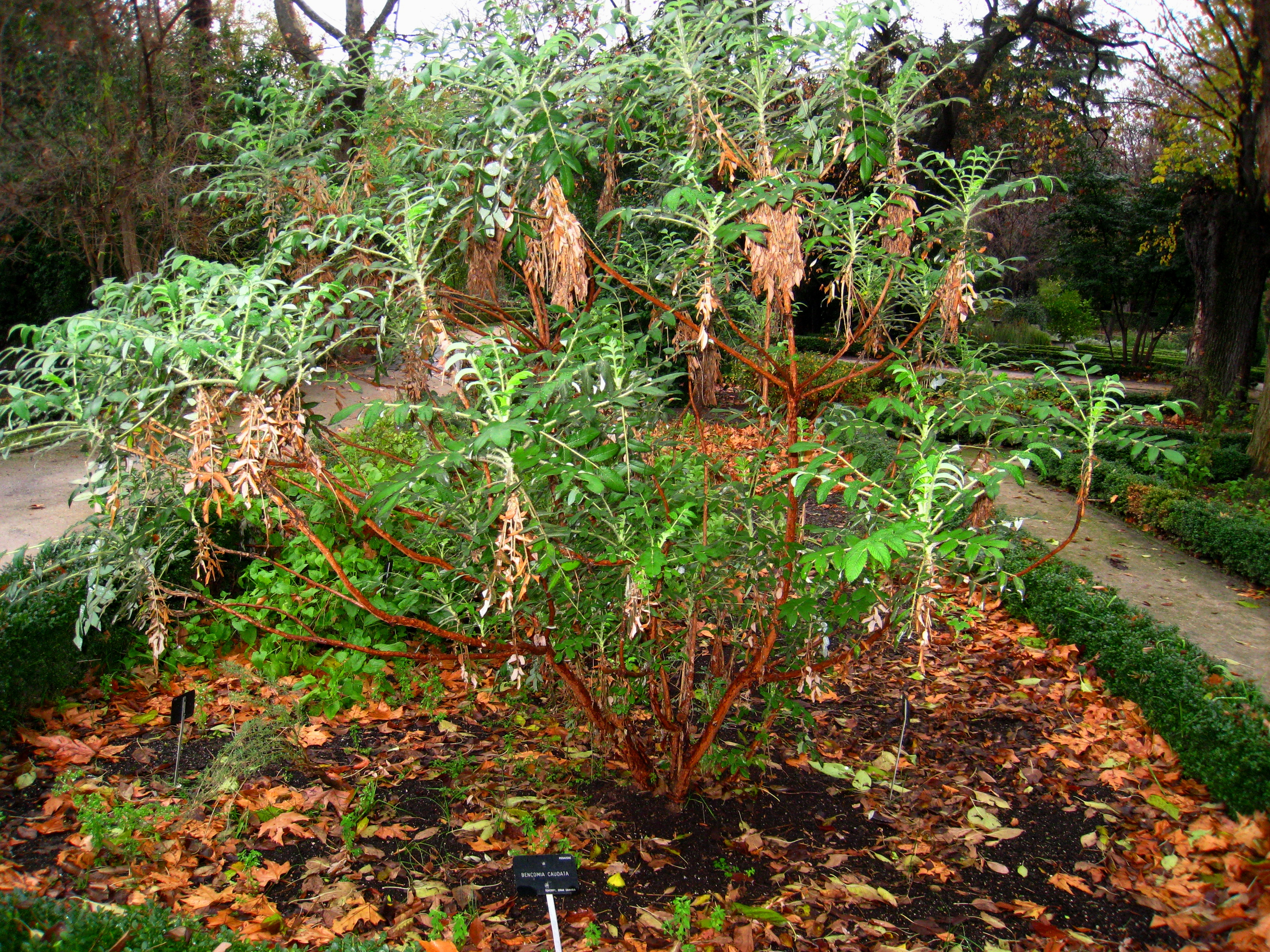
- Bencomia caudata

Scientific classification
- Kingdom: Plantae
- Clade: Tracheophytes
- Clade: Angiosperms
- Clade: Eudicots
- Clade: Rosids
- Order: Rosales
- Family: Rosaceae
- Subfamily: Rosoideae
- Tribe: Sanguisorbeae
- Subtribe: Sanguisorbinae
- Genus: Bencomia; Webb & Berthel.

Species
- Bencomia brachystachya; Bencomia caudata; Bencomia exstipulata; Bencomia sphaerocarpa

= Bencomia =

Genus of shrubs

Bencomia is a genus of four rare plant species, which grow as woody, branching shrubs with glossy, evergreen leaves and central, pendulous inflorescences with small flowers followed by densely packed, globular fruits. Mature heights range from 1 to 4 meters.

They are endemic to the Canary Islands and Madeira.

The genus was originally described by botanists Philip Barker-Webb and Sabin Berthelot and is named after Bencomo.

== Species ==
- Bencomia brachystachya
- Bencomia caudata
- Bencomia exstipulata
- Bencomia sphaerocarpa

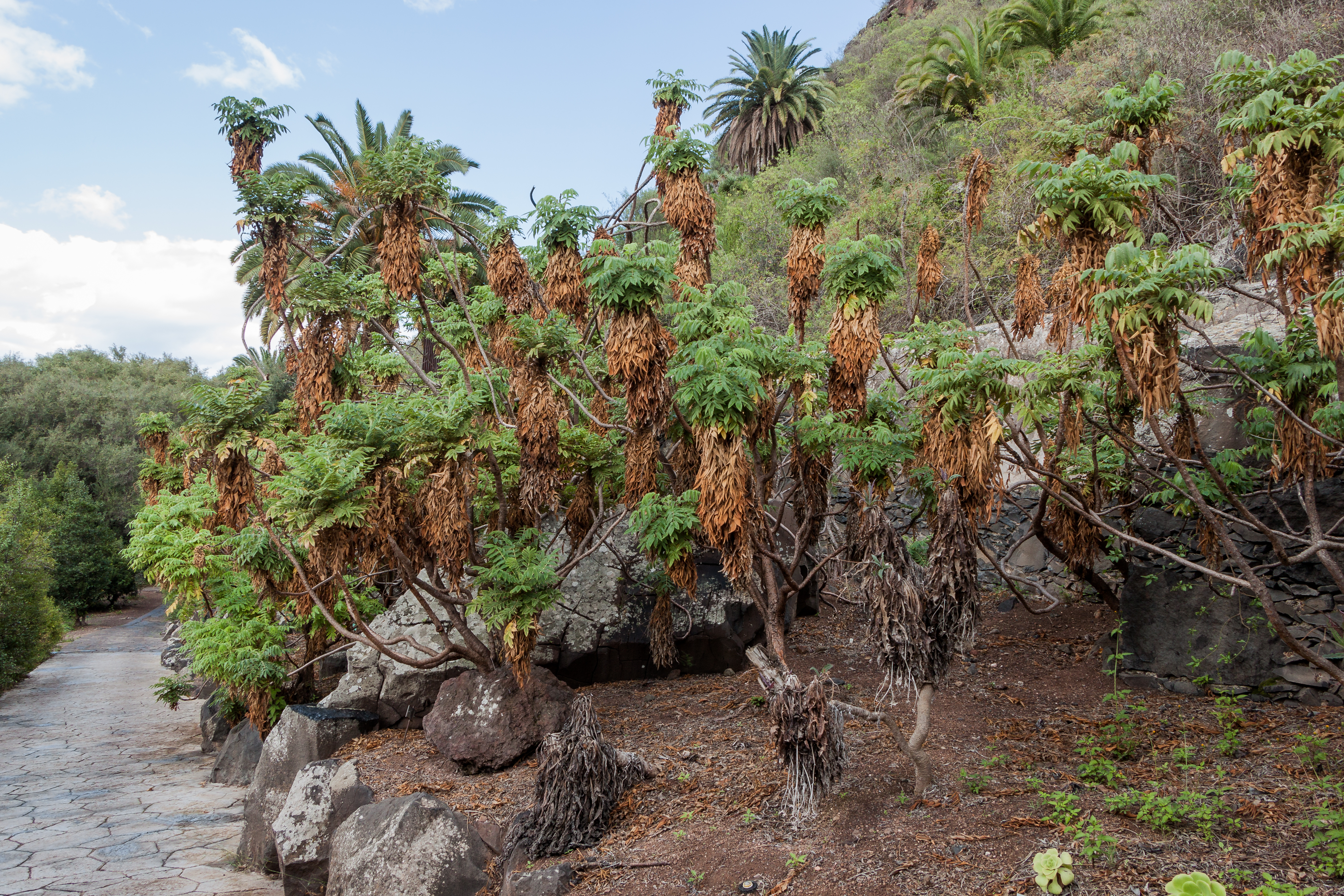
Bencomia sphaerocarpa
