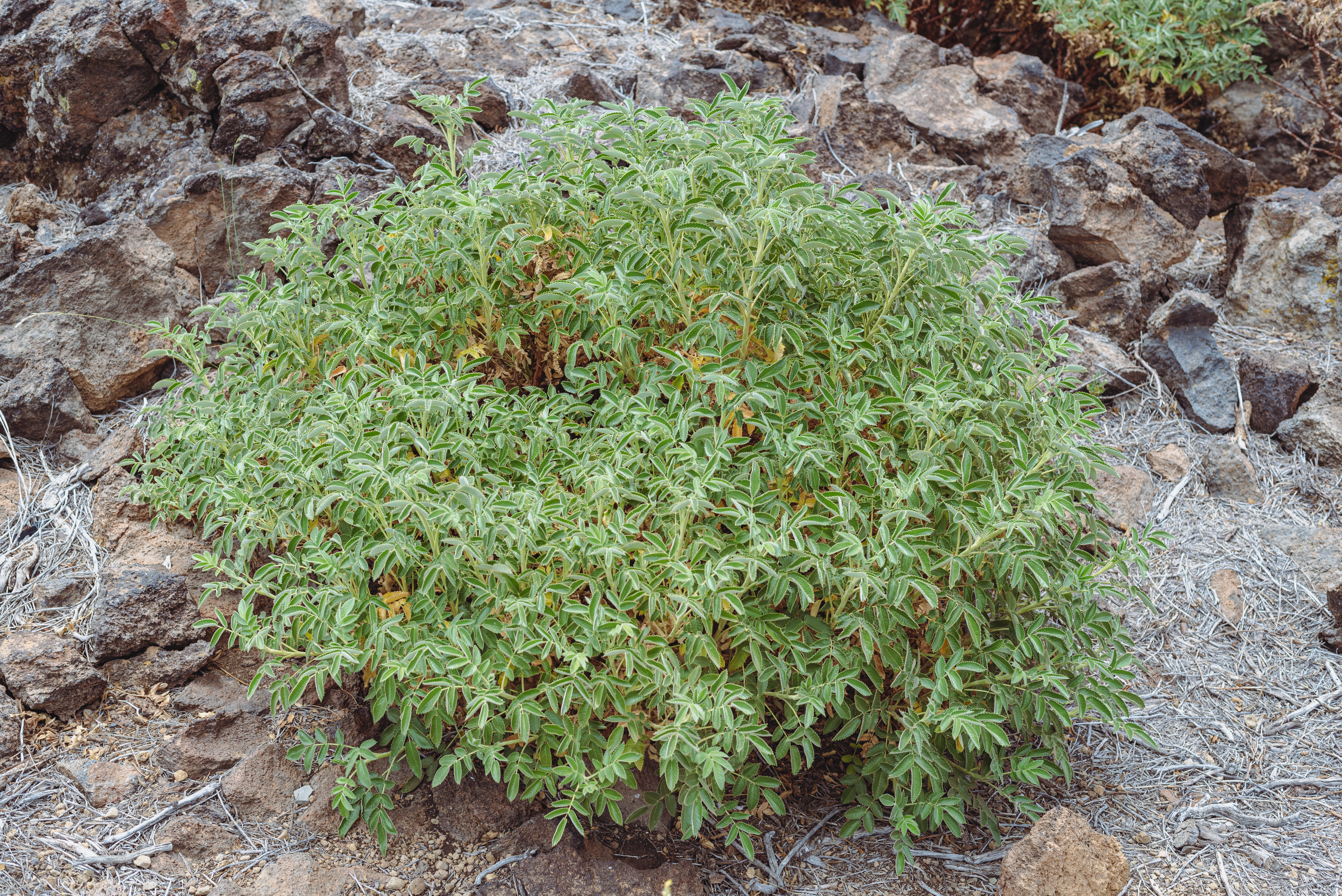

Conservation status
- Vulnerable (IUCN 3.1)

Scientific classification
- Kingdom: Plantae
- Clade: Tracheophytes
- Clade: Angiosperms
- Clade: Eudicots
- Clade: Rosids
- Order: Rosales
- Family: Rosaceae
- Genus: Bencomia
- Species: B. exstipulata

Binomial name
- Bencomia exstipulata Svent

= Bencomia exstipulata =

Species of plant

Bencomia exstipulata, the Guanches’ rose or summit bencomia, is a species in the flowering plant family of Rosaceae.

== Description ==
The shrub grows 50-100cm tall and is monoecious or unisexual-female. Its branches are tortuous and its bark is glabrous. It has compound leaves, which are pubescent-glandular. The inflocrescences of the plant are simple or racemose with a length of 4-8cm with the flowering period lasting from April to May. The fruits are depressed-globose and about 5mm in diameter with the fruiting period lasting from June to July. It is tetraploid with a chromosome count of 2n=28.

== Range ==
The species is endemic to the Canary Islands of La Palma and Tenerife, where it can be found in altitudes of above 1800m. On Tenerife it can only be found in altitudes of 2100 to 2200 in the South-west of the Caldera las Cañadas del Teide. On La Palma it is found in the Caldera de Taburiente National Park.

== Habitat ==
Bencomia exstipulata participates in shrub communities on rocky areas and is typical of the Spartocytision supranubii alliance.

== Ecology ==
The IUCN redlist records the species as vulnerable, while the catalogue of protected species of the Canary Islands considers it endangered. Besides its low reproduction rate, low number of specimens and fires, introduced species like Barbary sheep, domestic sheep, goats and European rabbits are a threat to its stock. Bencomia exstipulata is mostly wind pollinated, although its flowers get visited frequently by honey bees with probably some insect pollination occurring. Some self-pollination is also assumed. Gallotia galloti eats the seeds of the plant and they pass through the digestive tract with the capability of germination intact. It is suggested that the lizards serve as a seed disperser.
