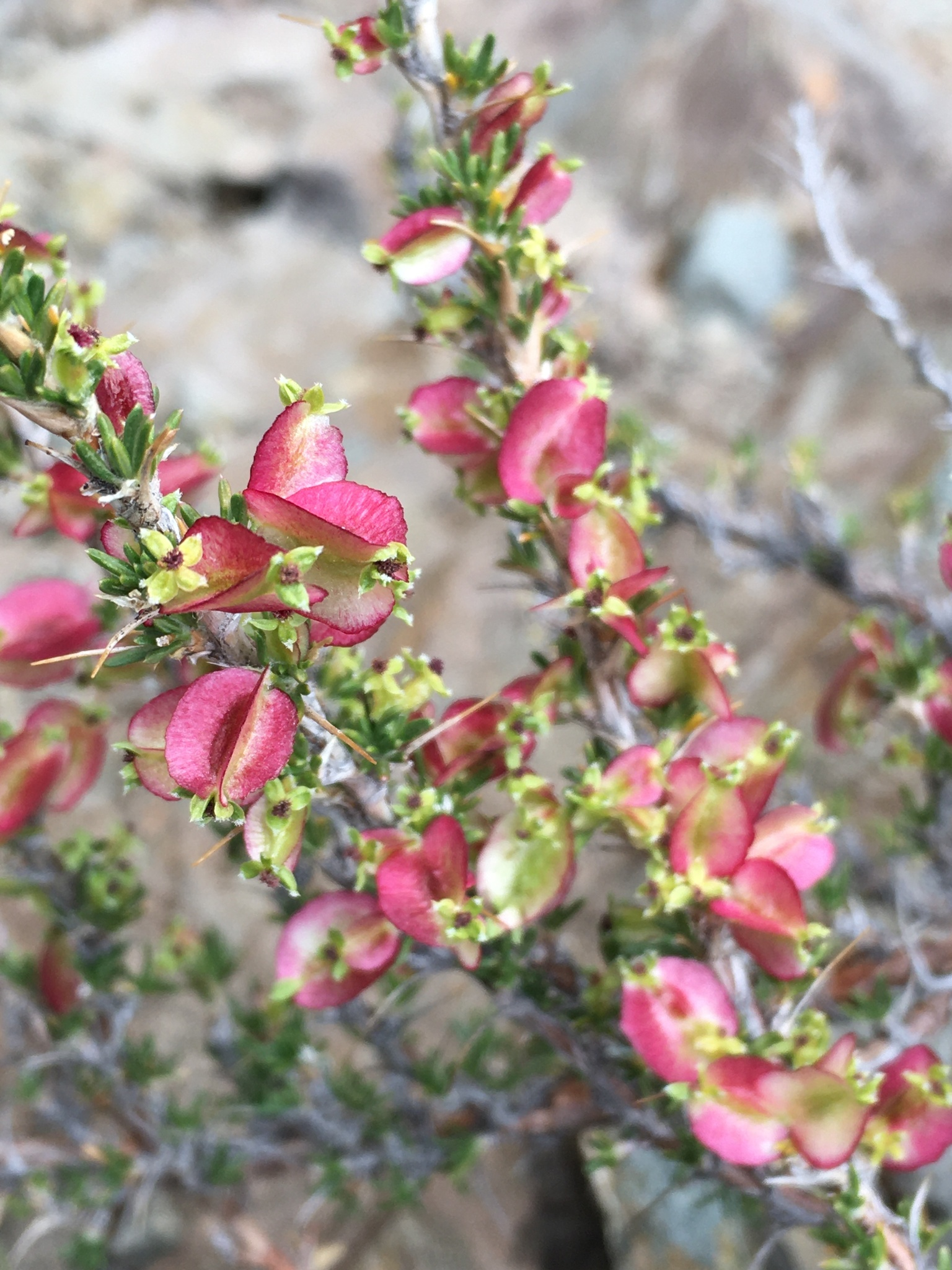
- Tetraglochin alata in Chile

Scientific classification
- Kingdom: Plantae
- Clade: Tracheophytes
- Clade: Angiosperms
- Clade: Eudicots
- Clade: Rosids
- Order: Rosales
- Family: Rosaceae
- Subfamily: Rosoideae
- Tribe: Sanguisorbeae
- Subtribe: Sanguisorbinae
- Genus: Tetraglochin; Poepp.

= Tetraglochin =

Genus of flowering plants

Tetraglochin is a genus of flowering plants belonging to the family Rosaceae.

Its native range is Peru to Southern South America.

Species:

- Tetraglochin acanthocarpa (Speg.) Speg.
- Tetraglochin alata (Gillies ex Hook. & Arn.) Kuntze
