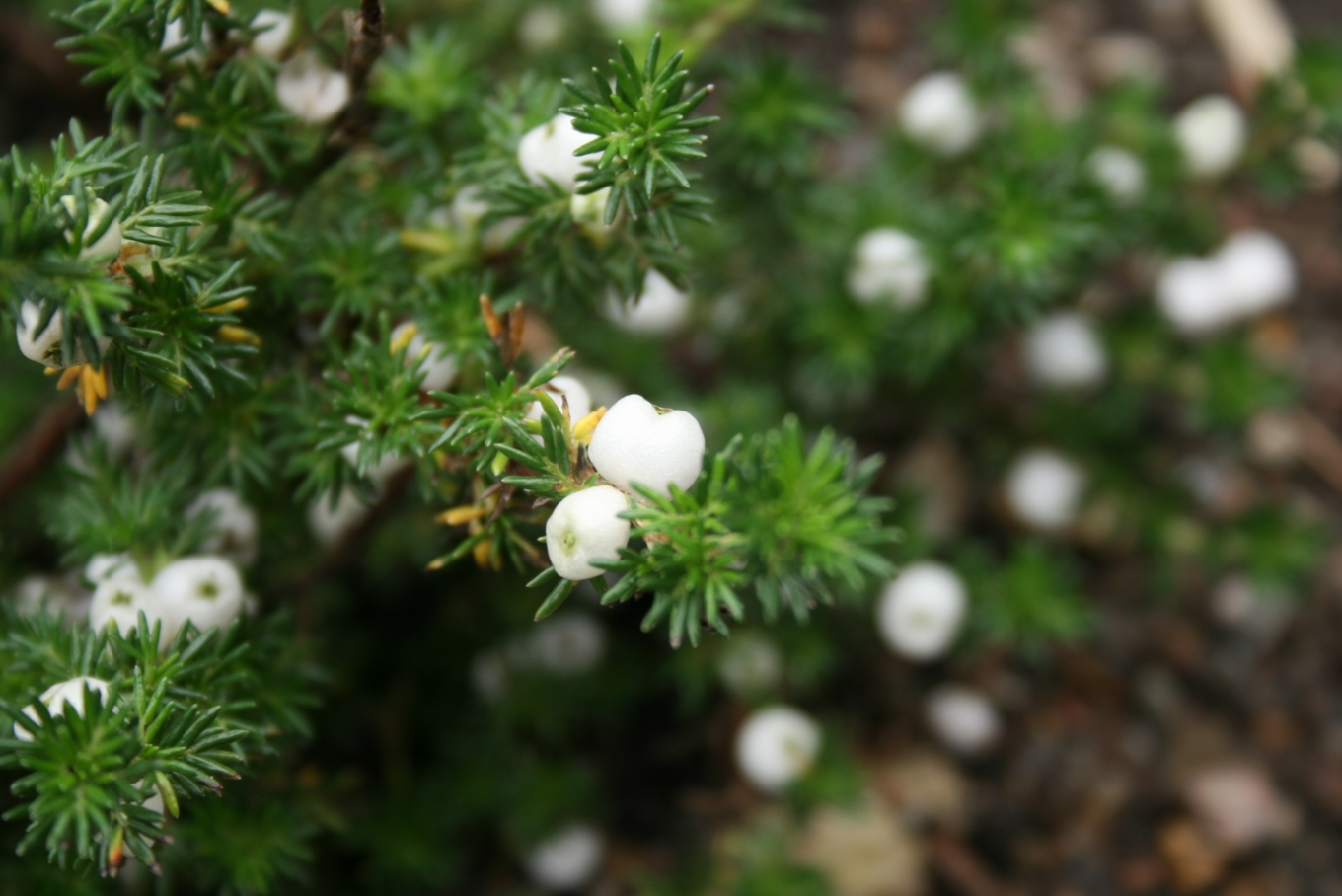
- Margyricarpus pinnatus

Scientific classification
- Kingdom: Plantae
- Clade: Embryophytes
- Clade: Tracheophytes
- Clade: Spermatophytes
- Clade: Angiosperms
- Clade: Eudicots
- Clade: Rosids
- Order: Rosales
- Family: Rosaceae
- Subfamily: Rosoideae
- Genus: Margyricarpus; Ruiz & Pav.

Species
- See text

= Margyricarpus =

Genus of plants

Margyricarpus is a genus of flowering plant in the family Rosaceae, native to South America.

== Taxonomy ==
The genus was first described by Hipólito Ruiz López and José Antonio Pavón Jiménez in 1794. It is placed in the subtribe Sanguisorbinae.

=== Species ===
Accepted species include the following:

- Margyricarpus digynus (Bitter) Skottsb.
- Margyricarpus lanatus Funez
- Margyricarpus microcarpus Funez
- Margyricarpus pinnatus (Lam.) Kuntze
