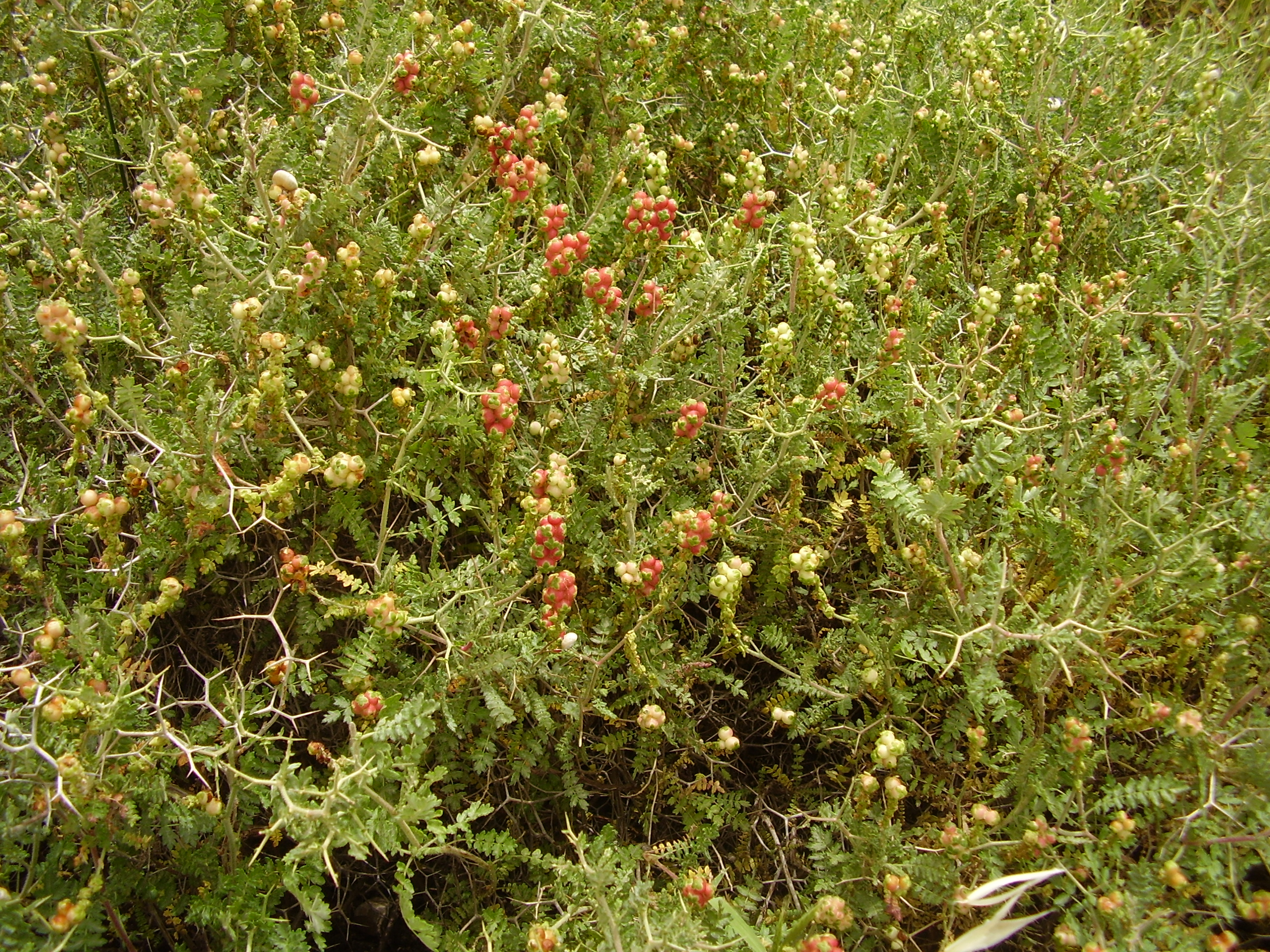
- Sarcopoterium spinosum

Scientific classification
- Kingdom: Plantae
- Clade: Embryophytes
- Clade: Tracheophytes
- Clade: Spermatophytes
- Clade: Angiosperms
- Clade: Eudicots
- Clade: Rosids
- Order: Rosales
- Family: Rosaceae
- Tribe: Sanguisorbeae
- Subtribe: Sanguisorbinae
- Genus: Sarcopoterium; Spach
- Species: S. spinosum

Binomial name
- Sarcopoterium spinosum (L.) Spach

Synonyms
- List: Bencomia spinosa (L.) G.Nicholson; Pimpinella spinosa Gaertn.; Poterium spinosum L.; Sanguisorba spinosa (L.) Bertol.

= Sarcopoterium =

Genus of flowering plants in the rose family

Sarcopoterium is a genus of flowering plants in the rose family. The genus is sometimes considered synonymous to Poterium. The sole species within this genus, Sarcopoterium spinosum, is common to the southeast Mediterranean region and the Middle East. In English it is known as the prickly, spiny, or thorny burnet It is a perennial bush with small flowers in inflorescence. Sarcopoterium spinosum flowers in February to April and its fruits mature in autumn, then fall to earth to germinate with the rain water.

Sarcopoterium spinosum has spines. In the summer (high temperatures) it is dry and appears dead.

== Gallery ==
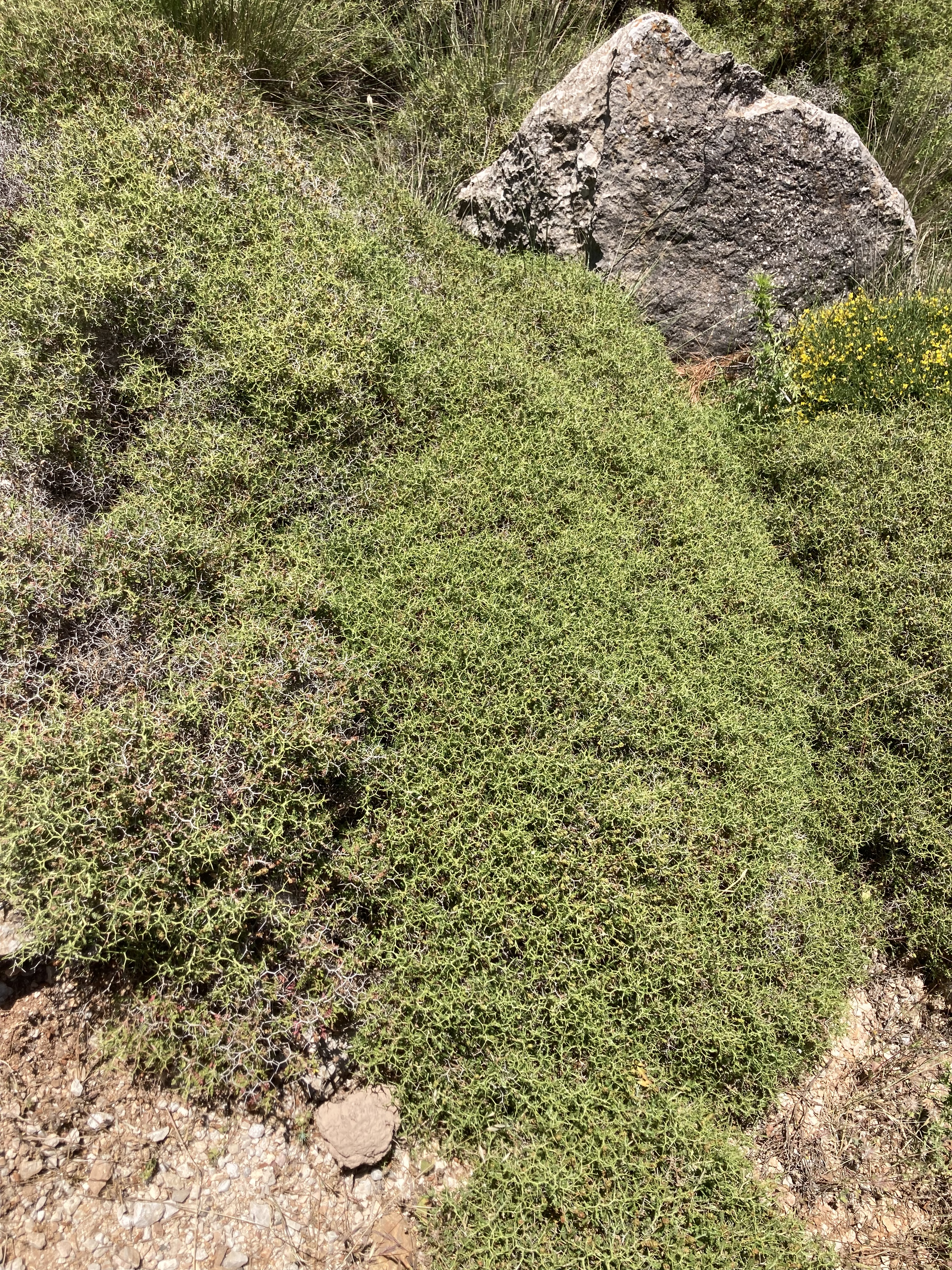
S. spinosum on Mount Attavyros on Rhodes.

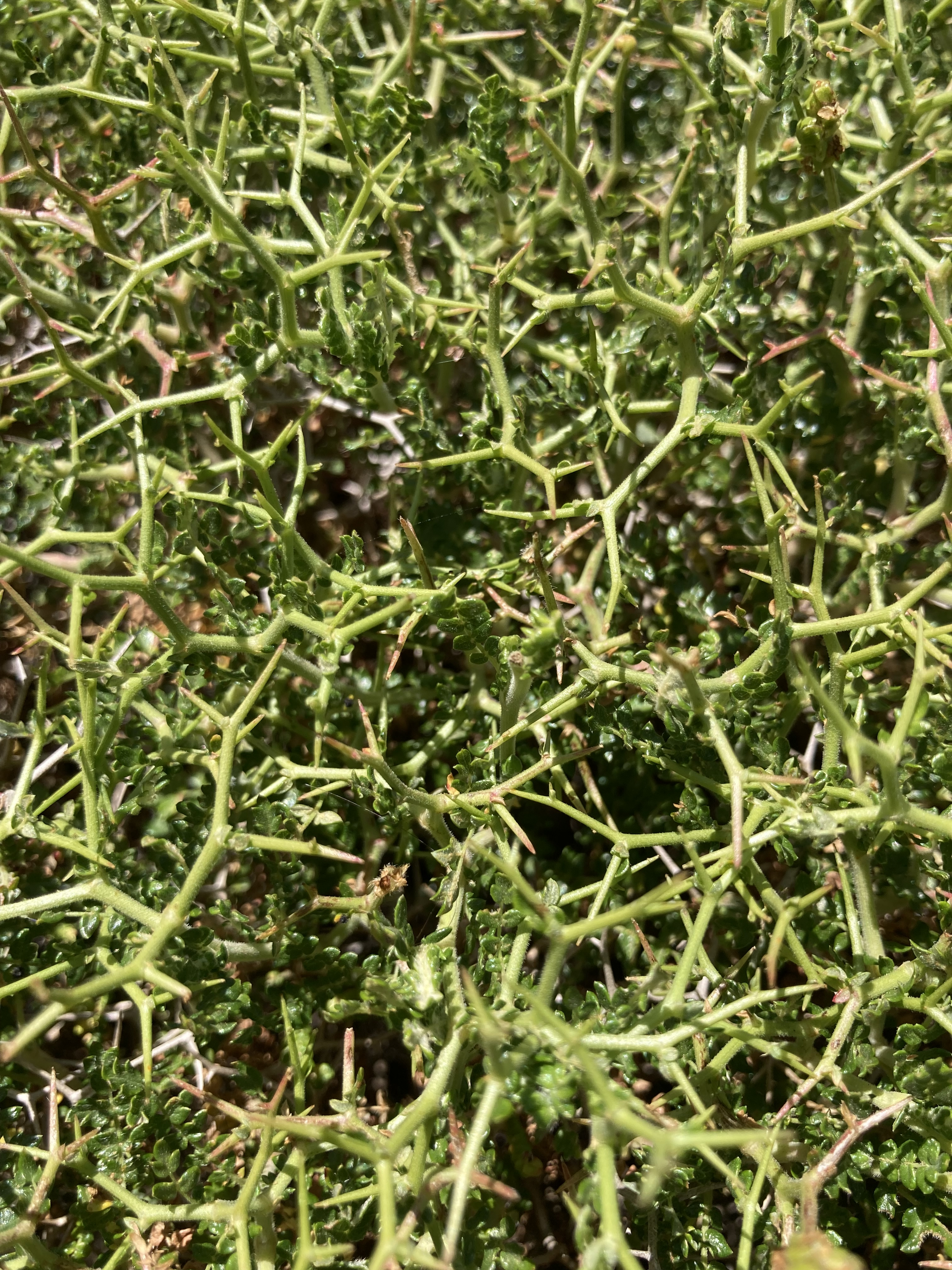
Detail of leaves and spines

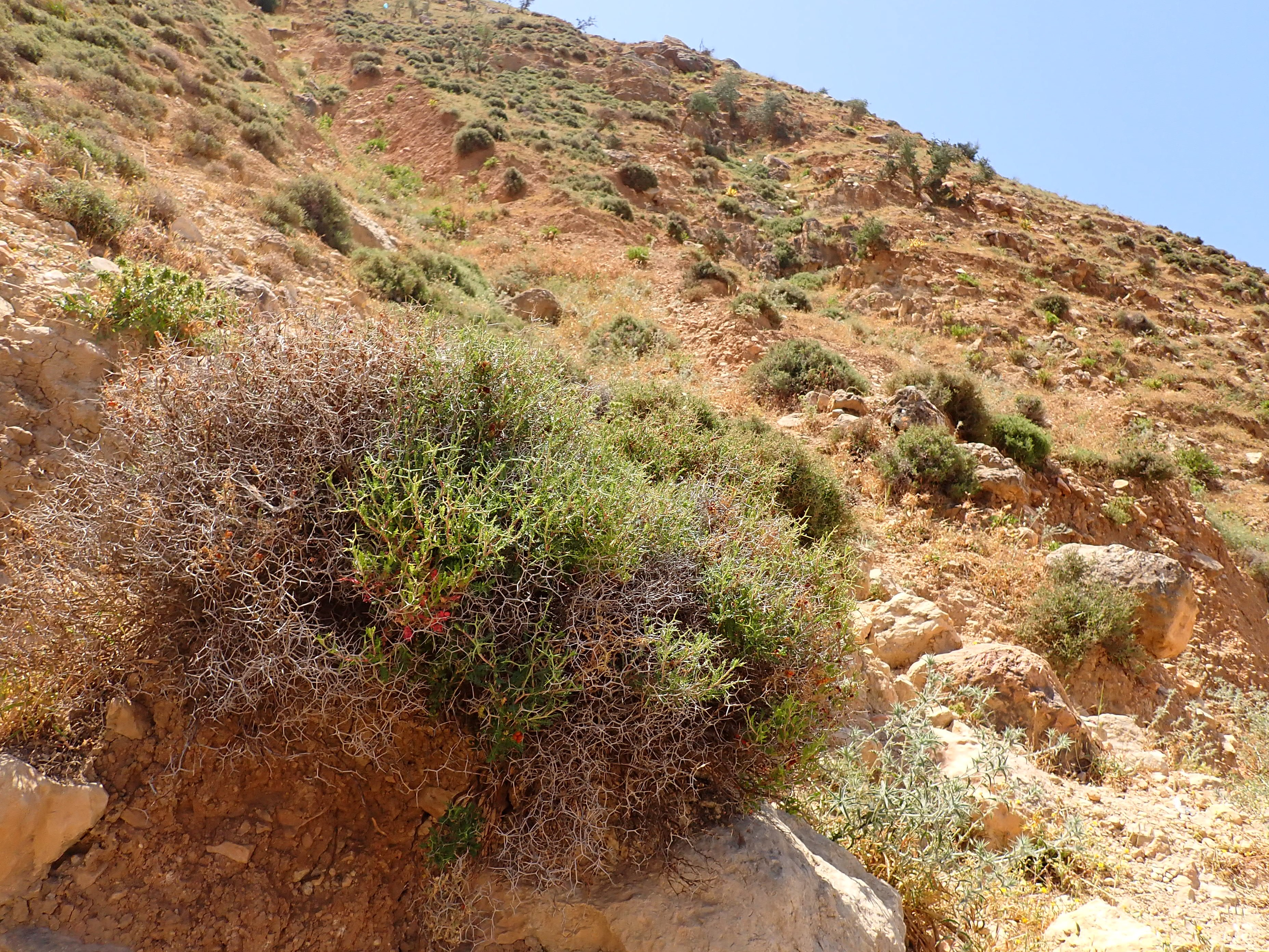
A specimen in an arid environment in Jordan

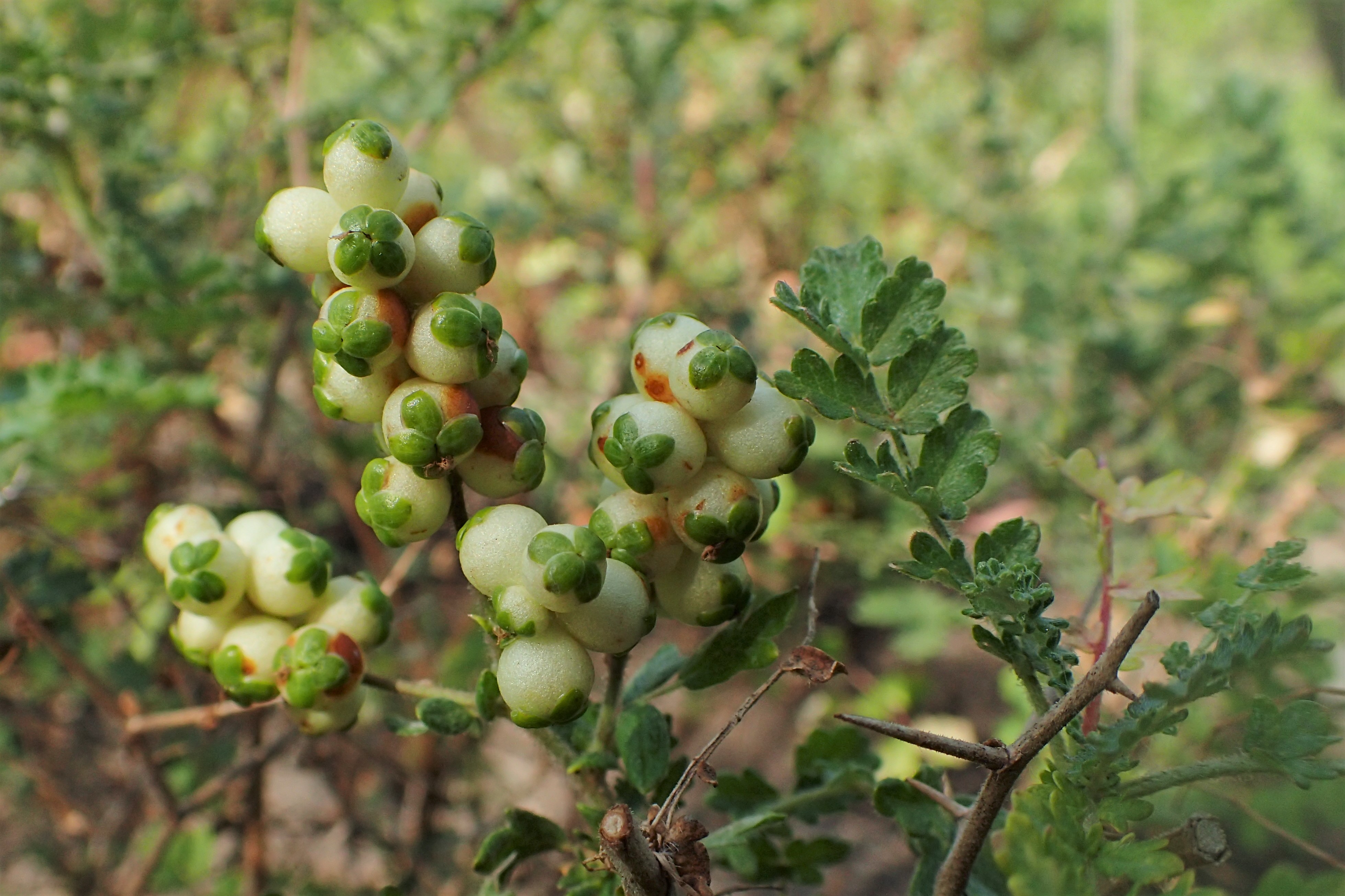
Detail of the unripe fruits
