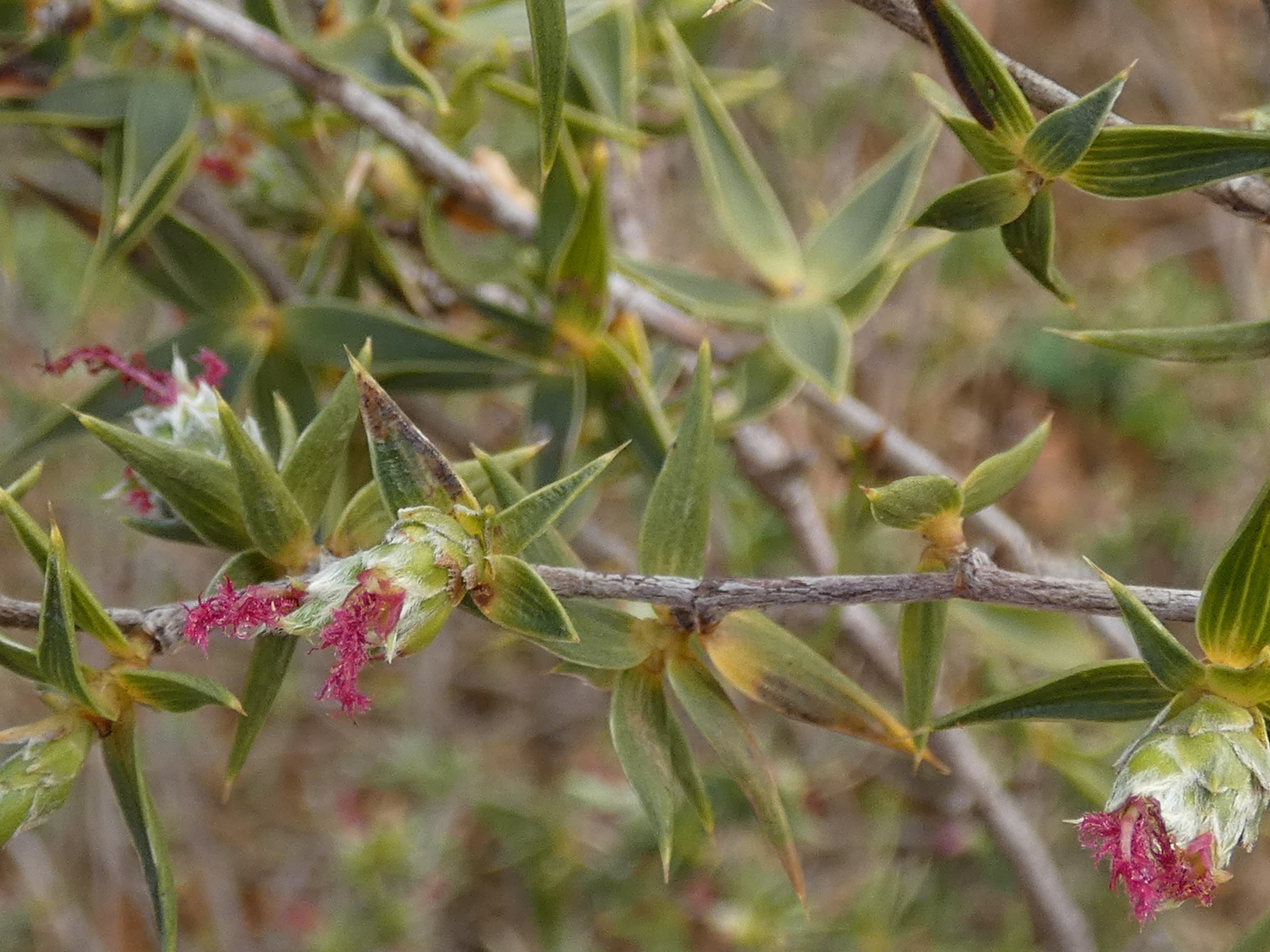
- Cliffortia ruscifolia, on the Gifberg

Scientific classification
- Kingdom: Plantae
- Clade: Tracheophytes
- Clade: Angiosperms
- Clade: Eudicots
- Clade: Rosids
- Order: Rosales
- Family: Rosaceae
- Subfamily: Rosoideae
- Tribe: Sanguisorbeae
- Subtribe: Sanguisorbinae
- Genus: Cliffortia; L.

Synonyms
- Morilandia; Monographidium

= Cliffortia =

Genus of shrubs in the rose family from southern Africa

Cliffortia, or Caperose is a genus of plants that has been assigned to the rose family, with currently 132 known species. Its species can be found in southern Africa, particularly in the Cape Floristic Region (CFR) where 124 of the species can be found, 109 of which are endemic to the CFR. Most species are ericoid shrubs, some small trees up to 5 m (16 1/2 ft) high, others more or less herbaceous groundcover. All are wind pollinated and have separate male and female flowers in the axils of the leaves, mostly individually, sometimes grouped, which may be on the same plant or on separate plants.

== Description ==
Cliffortia species are mostly upright shrubs, but some species develop into small trees of up to 5 m (16 1/2 ft) high, are more or less herbaceous groundcover or grow in a dense tangle. The stipules have merged with the base of the leaf and form a sheath around the branch. The leaves are alternately arranged along the stems, and may consist of three, two or only one leaflet with one or several main veins, seated or on a leaf stalk. Leaflets may be thin or leathery, broad to needle-shaped, with the margin serrated or entire, and may have a spiny tip. Cliffortia has separate male and female flowers in the leaf axils, which are mostly set individually but sometimes in clusters. Some species have both male and female flowers on the same plant (and are monoecious), while other species have plants of separate gender (or are dioecious). The flowers never have petals, which in other plant species predominantly function to attract pollinators, but that function is of cause unnecessary in wind-pollinated taxa, such as in the entire genus Cliffortia. 3-merous flowers almost certainly represent the ancestral state, and it has been suggested that 4-merous flowers have arisen at four independent occasions. Trimerous flowers have three sepals of variable size, and in male flowers six to many stamens. Tetramerous flowers have four sepals of 5 mm long at most and either four or eight stamens. In female flowers the sepals are united at their base to form a calyx tube, and have one or two styles, that are finely divided like an ostridge feather. One or two achenes may develop in each flower, within the inflating calyx.

== Taxonomy ==
The first who mentioned species that are currently assigned to Cliffortia was Leonard Plukenet in 1696. Names published before 1753, the year that was chosen as a starting point for the binominal nomenclature proposed by Carl Linnaeus, are not valid however. It was Linnaeus himself who provided the first descriptions in the Species Plantarum, his groundbreaking work of 1753, which he named C. ilicifolia, C. ruscifolia, C. polygonifolia and C. trifoliata. In 1808, Necker subdivided the genus and created Morilandia, while Carl Borivoj Presl suggested to split-off Monographidium in 1849, but neither was followed by later authors.

Cliffortia is placed in a monophyletic subfamily Rosoidea and the tribe Sanguisorbeae. The immediate sister taxon of Cliffortia may either be the holarctic genus Sanguisorba or the Gondwanan genus Acaena. Cliffortia is clearly monophyletic, but within it only four monophyletic subgenera can be recognised. These are named Arborea, Cliffortia, Eriocephalina and Graminea.

Since comparison of homologous DNA of different genes (in the nucleus and chloroplast respectively) result in other phylogenetic trees, it is assumed that many Cliffortia species have hybridized. Their off-spring survived and propagated further, forming new nothospecies. This is called reticulate evolution, which is assumed to be widespread within Cliffortia.

Cliffortia has been named in honor of George Clifford III, a wealthy Dutch banker and director of the Dutch East India Company, who enabled Linnaeus to write the Hortus Cliffortianus in 1737.

== Ecology ==
Cliffortia species differ in their tolerance for fire, and roughly three strategies may be distinguished. A large proportion of the species resprouts from the underground rootstock. Many other species have seeds that are collected by ants and survive in their underground nests. Fewer species survive the less intense fires by regrowing from the crown of the plant, but those species grow in locations that do not sustain intense fires, such as isolated from the surrounding vegetation by bare rock (C. neglecta, C. tuberculata, C. complanata and C. propinqua), wet areas (C. aculeata, C. graminea, C. nivenioides and C. strobilifera), or montane grasslands (C. linearifolia, C. nitidula subsp. pilosa, C. repens and C. spathulata).

== Distribution and habitat ==
Cliffortia species can be found throughout the Cape Floristic Region, where they almost exclusively grow in fynbos, and in the transition zones with adjoining biomes like the Karoo and Albany thickets. Within the Cape Floristic Region, it occurs in the widest range of environments, from the highest mountain peaks to coastal sand flats. Some species are bound to constantly moist soils (such as C. strobilifera near streams on acid to neutral soils, and C. longifolia near streams on marine sands and limestone deposits) while others live on the arid, mountainous edge of the Karoo in rock crevices. Most Cliffortia species are limited to acidic and nutrient-poor sandy soils, but some also grow on alkaline limestone soils (C. falcata, C. ferruginea, C. filifolia and C. obcordata) or more fertile shales such as in the Bokkeveld (such as C. filicaulis, C. juniperina and C. polygonifolia). C. complanata and C. propinqua are both confined to shady rock crevices, except in the moisture of the south coast. Outside the Cape Floristic Region most of the Cliffortia species occur the afromontane heathlands, between Mount Kenya (C. nitidula) in the north to the southern Drakensberg in the south. Few grow on dolorites near the Great Escarpment and sandstone at low altitude in the Eastern Cape and Kwazulu-Natal.
