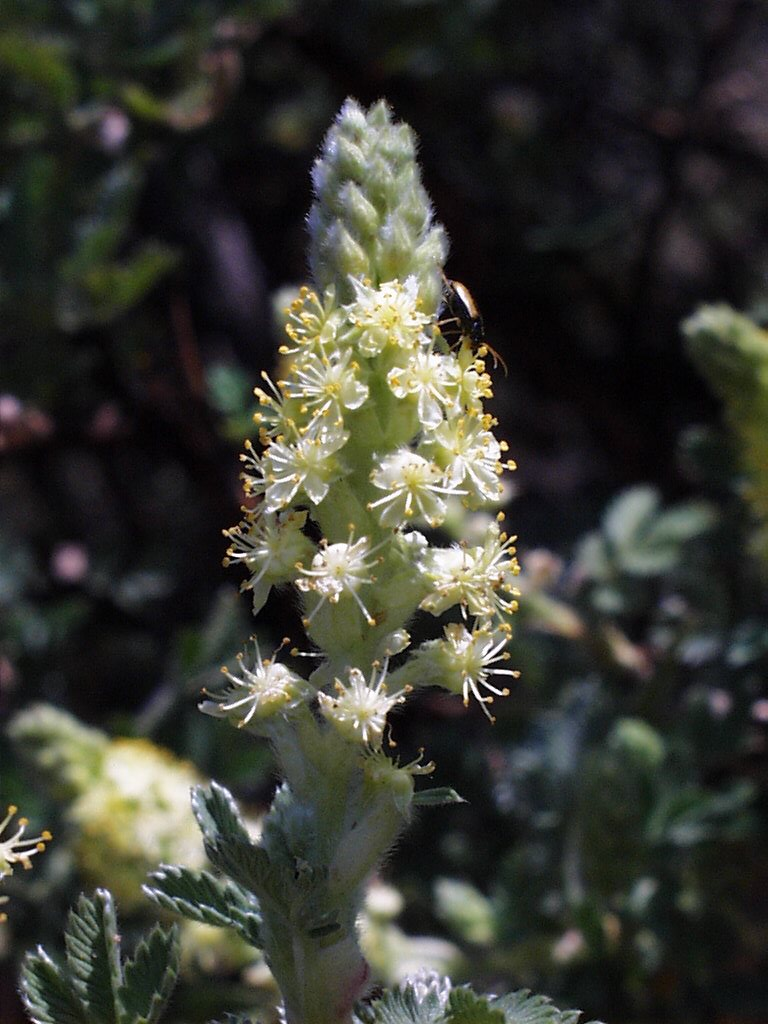
- The inflorescence, a terminal spike with small yellowish-green flowers

Conservation status
- Least Concern (IUCN 3.1)

Scientific classification
- Kingdom: Plantae
- Clade: Tracheophytes
- Clade: Angiosperms
- Clade: Eudicots
- Clade: Rosids
- Order: Rosales
- Family: Rosaceae
- Subfamily: Rosoideae
- Tribe: Sanguisorbeae
- Subtribe: Agrimoniinae
- Genus: Leucosidea; Eckl. & Zeyh.
- Species: L. sericea

Binomial name
- Leucosidea sericea Eckl. & Zeyh.

= Leucosidea =

Oldwood

Genus of flowering plants

Leucosidea sericea, commonly known as oldwood, is an evergreen tree or large shrub that grows in the highland regions of southern Africa. It is the sole species in the monotypic genus Leucosidea. The name oldwood may reflect the fact that the wood burns slowly, as if old and rotting; the gnarled, twisted trunks reinforce this impression.

== Taxonomy ==
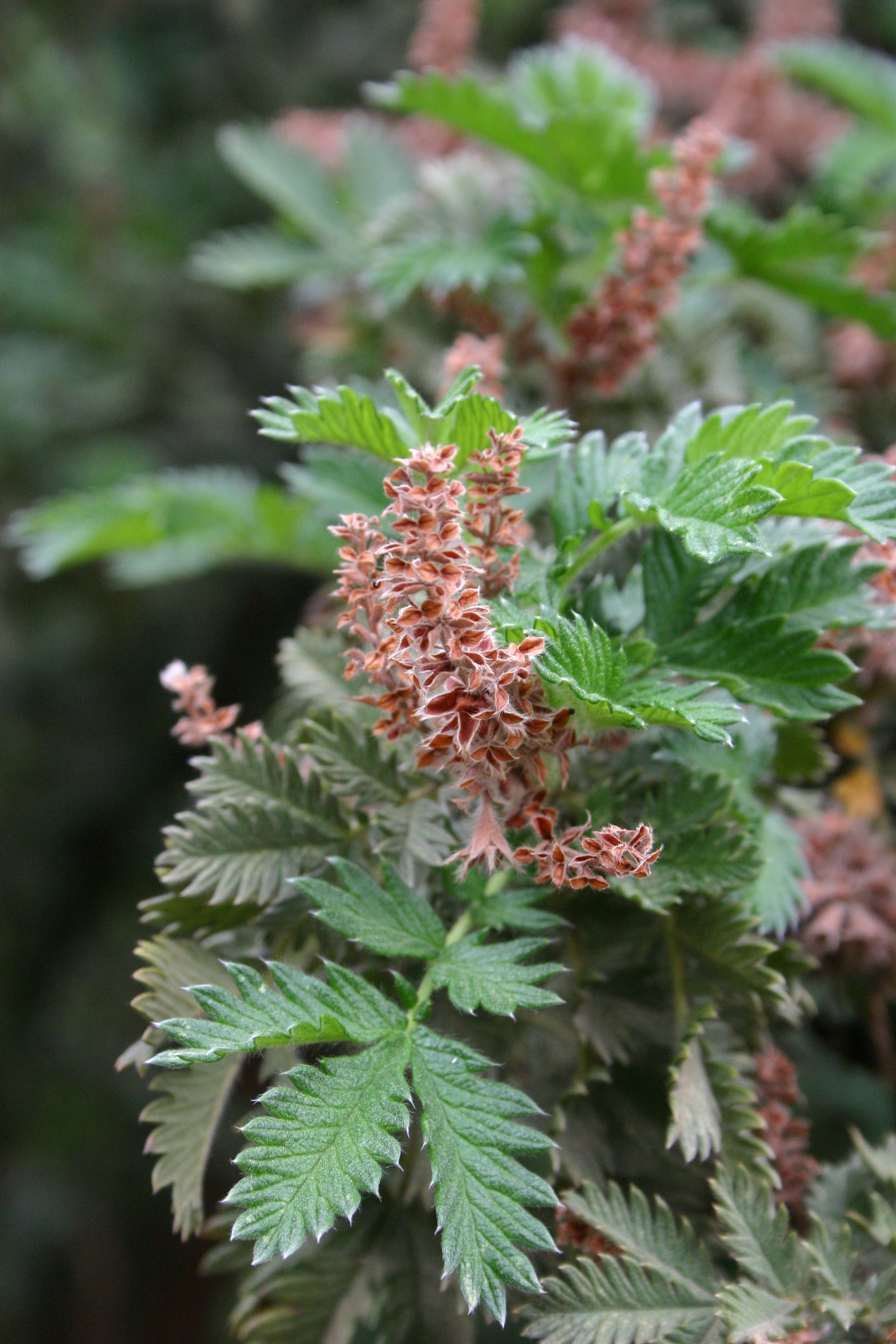
Foliage and flower bracts

Leucosidea sericea is a member of the Rosaceae, also known as the rose family. Although this family is very large and economically important worldwide, it is poorly represented in Africa generally and in southern Africa in particular.

The genus name Leucosidea is a form of the Greek word λευκός (leukos), meaning "shining white", although in botany the root is more often used less specifically to indicate something of a generally white or gray appearance. The second or specific name sericea means "silky" and comes from σηρικός (serikos), which means both "silky" and "from the land of silk"; it refers to the silky hairs that cover the new buds and young leaves of the tree.

The English common name oldwood is simply a direct translation of the Afrikaans words "ouhout" or "oudehout", meaning the same thing. It is named for its appearance and tendency to burn slowly as if old and rotting.

== Description ==
Oldwood is often a straggly shrub or a dense, small, evergreen tree, which grows up to 7 metres tall to 5 metres wide. It is single or multi-stemmed and branches low down. The bark is rough, reddish brown in colour and flakes off to reveal a smooth light brown under-bark. The leaves are alternately arranged, compound and covered with silky, silver hairs. Each leaf possesses 3 to 4 pairs of leaflets. The veins on the leaves are deeply sunken on the upper surface and protrude on the lower surface. The leaves are a dark green colour above and a lighter green colour below. The margins of the leaflets are deeply serrated. When the leaves are crushed they have a strong herb-like smell.

The flowers are greenish-yellow in colour, star-shaped, and grow in spikes at the ends of young shoots in spring (August to September). The fruits are nut-like and about 3 mm in diameter (December to January).

The flowers and young shoots of this plant are browsed by cattle and goats in spring. Oldwood produces nectar which is probably utilised by bees and other insects.

== Distribution and habitat ==
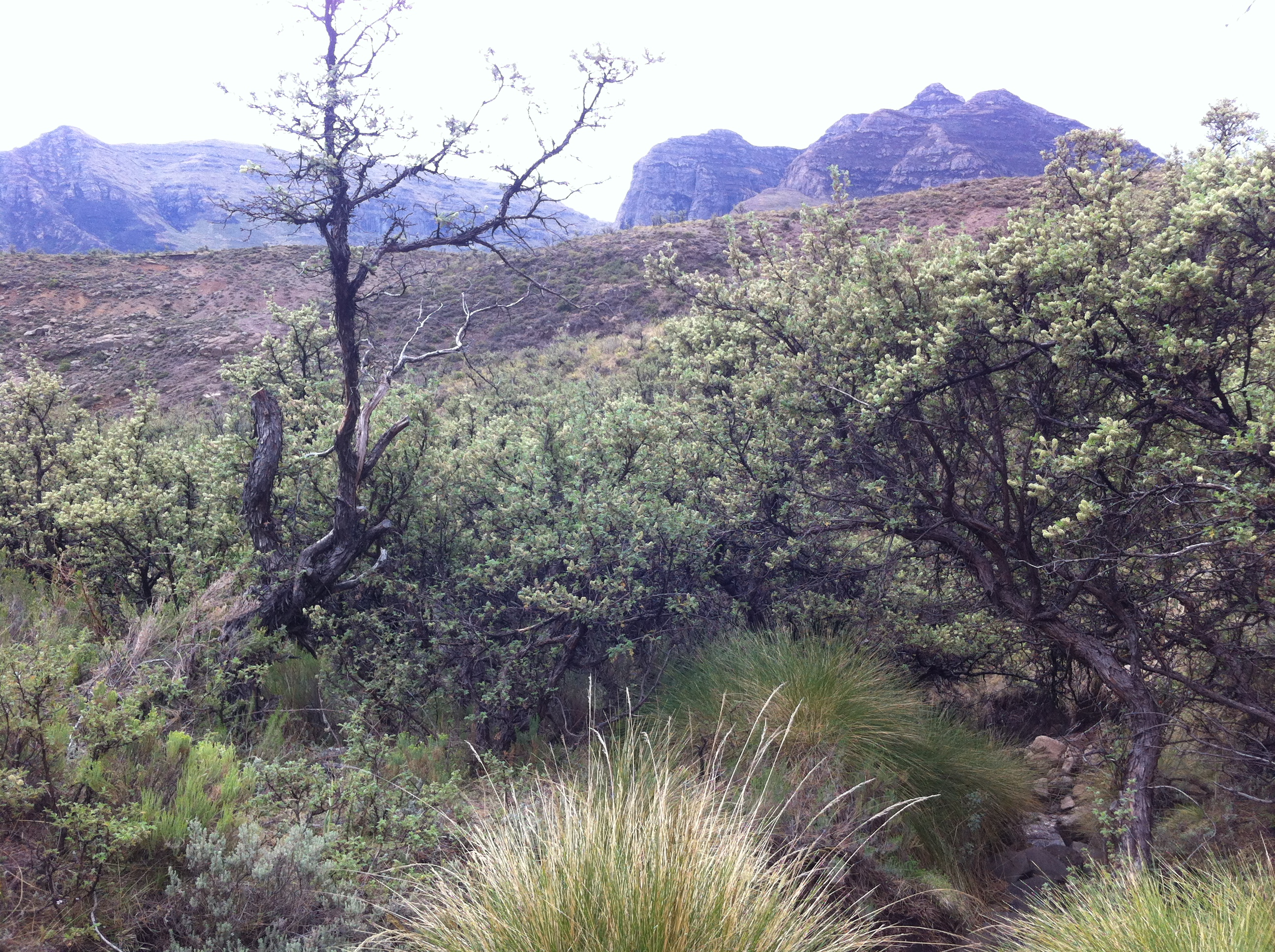
Oldwood thicket fringing a stream in the uplands of Lesotho

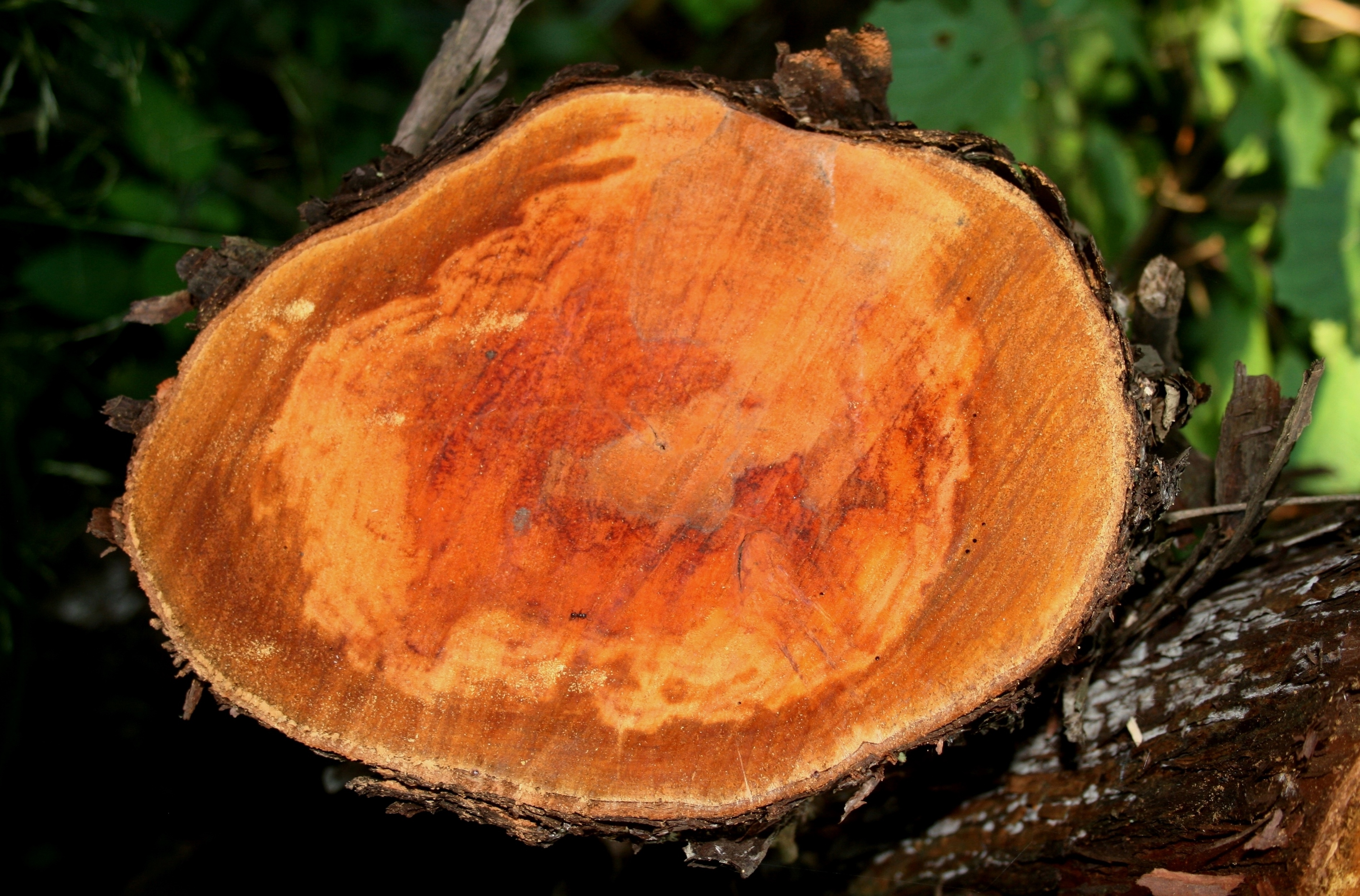
Cross section of a trunk

Leucosidea sericea can be found above an elevation of 1,000 metres (3,300 ft) in the highlands of South Africa (in the Eastern Cape, western KwaZulu-Natal, eastern Free State, the North West Province, Gauteng, Mpumalanga, and Limpopo), as well as in Lesotho and, rarely, in Eswatini and Zimbabwe. It forms dense thickets in disturbed areas, contributing to woody plant encroachment on farmlands. Its presence is an indication of overgrazing or poor veld management.

== Uses ==
Apparently in mountainous areas where oldwood occurs near streams it is an indication that they are suitable for being stocked with trout. Zulu people use a paste made from the crushed leaves of L. sericea for treating ophthalmia (an eye ailment). The tree is used by the local people as a charm to protect the inhabitants of homesteads.

It has been reported that the leaves of Leucosidea sericea are used medicinally by some indigenous South African people as a vermifuge and astringent. A study showed that "the plant has antimicrobial activity against Staphylococcus aureus, Bacillus subtilis and Candida albicans."

Leucosidea sericea is usually found growing in dense thickets at altitudes above 1,000 metres. It can be found growing in open grassland, along river banks and on wooded, rocky ridges. It is usually found growing in damp conditions, on deep, sandy or clayey and often rocky soil.

The wood weighs 38 pounds per cubic foot (0.61 g/cm^{3}), and is used mainly for fenceposts and fuel.
