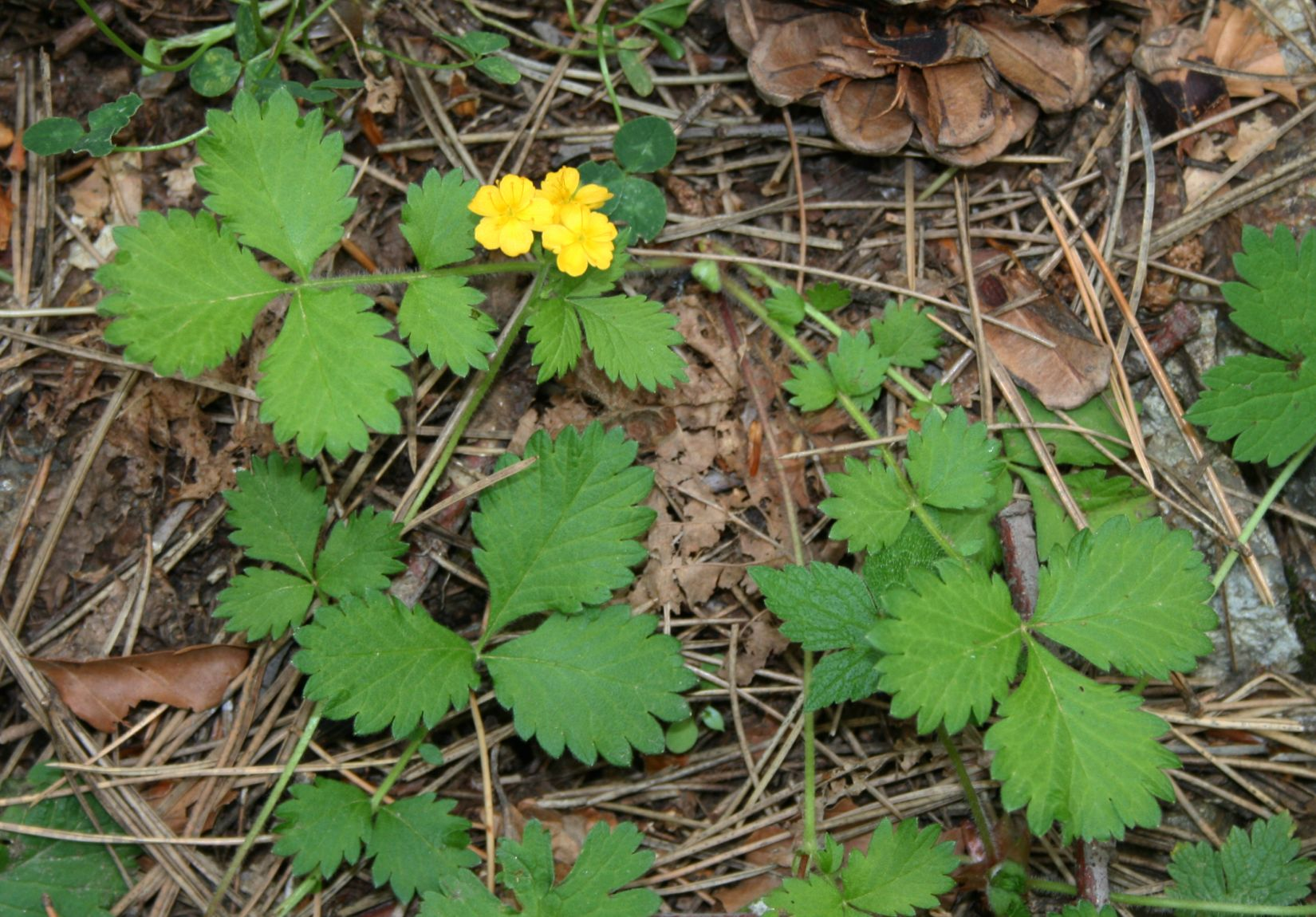
- Aremonia agrimonoides

Scientific classification
- Kingdom: Plantae
- Clade: Tracheophytes
- Clade: Angiosperms
- Clade: Eudicots
- Clade: Rosids
- Order: Rosales
- Family: Rosaceae
- Tribe: Sanguisorbeae
- Subtribe: Agrimoniinae
- Genus: Aremonia; Neck. ex Nestl. (1816), nom. cons.
- Species: A. agrimonoides

Binomial name
- Aremonia agrimonoides (L.) DC. (1825)

Synonyms
- Genus: Agrimonioides Wolf (1776); Agrimonoides Mill. (1754), nom. rejic.; Amonia Nestl. (1816); Sestinia Raf. (1814), nom. superfl.; Species: Agrimonia agrimonoides L. (1753); Amonia agrimonioides (L.) Nestl. (1816); Sanguisorba agrimonioides (L.) Cout. (1913); Spallanzania agrimonoides (L.) Pollini (1816)

= Aremonia =

Species of flowering plant

Aremonia agrimonoides, commonly known as bastard-agrimony, is a herbaceous flowering plant in the rose family, Rosaceae. The native range of this species is central and southeastern Europe to Türkiye. It is the sole species in genus Aremonia.

== See also ==
- Agrimonia (the genus of true agrimony)
- Eupatorium cannabinum (hemp agrimony)
