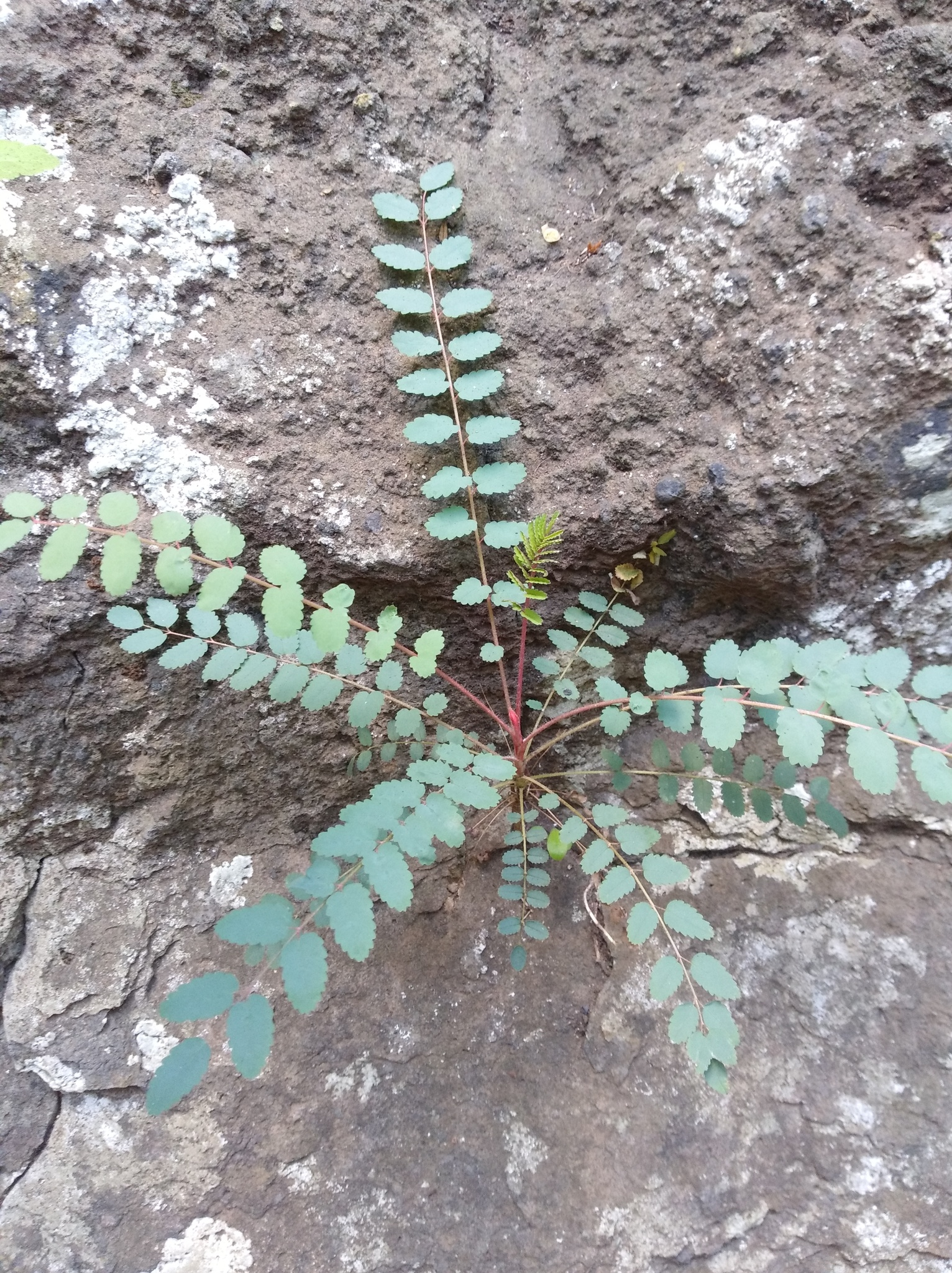
- Marcetella moquiniana

Scientific classification
- Kingdom: Plantae
- Clade: Tracheophytes
- Clade: Angiosperms
- Clade: Eudicots
- Clade: Rosids
- Order: Rosales
- Family: Rosaceae
- Genus: Marcetella; Svent.

= Marcetella =

Genus of flowering plant

Marcetella is a genus of flowering plants belonging to the family Rosaceae.

It is native to the Canary Islands and Madeira within Macaronesia.

The genus name of Marcetella is in honour of Adeodato Francisco Marcet (1875–1964), a Spanish clergyman, botanist and agronomist. Who also worked in a botanical garden in Blanes. It was first described and published in Bol. Inst. Nac. Invest. Agron. Vol.18 (Issue 95) on page 263 in 1948.

== Species ==
According to Kew:

- Marcetella maderensis (Bornm.) Svent.
- Marcetella moquiniana (Webb & Berthel.) Svent.
