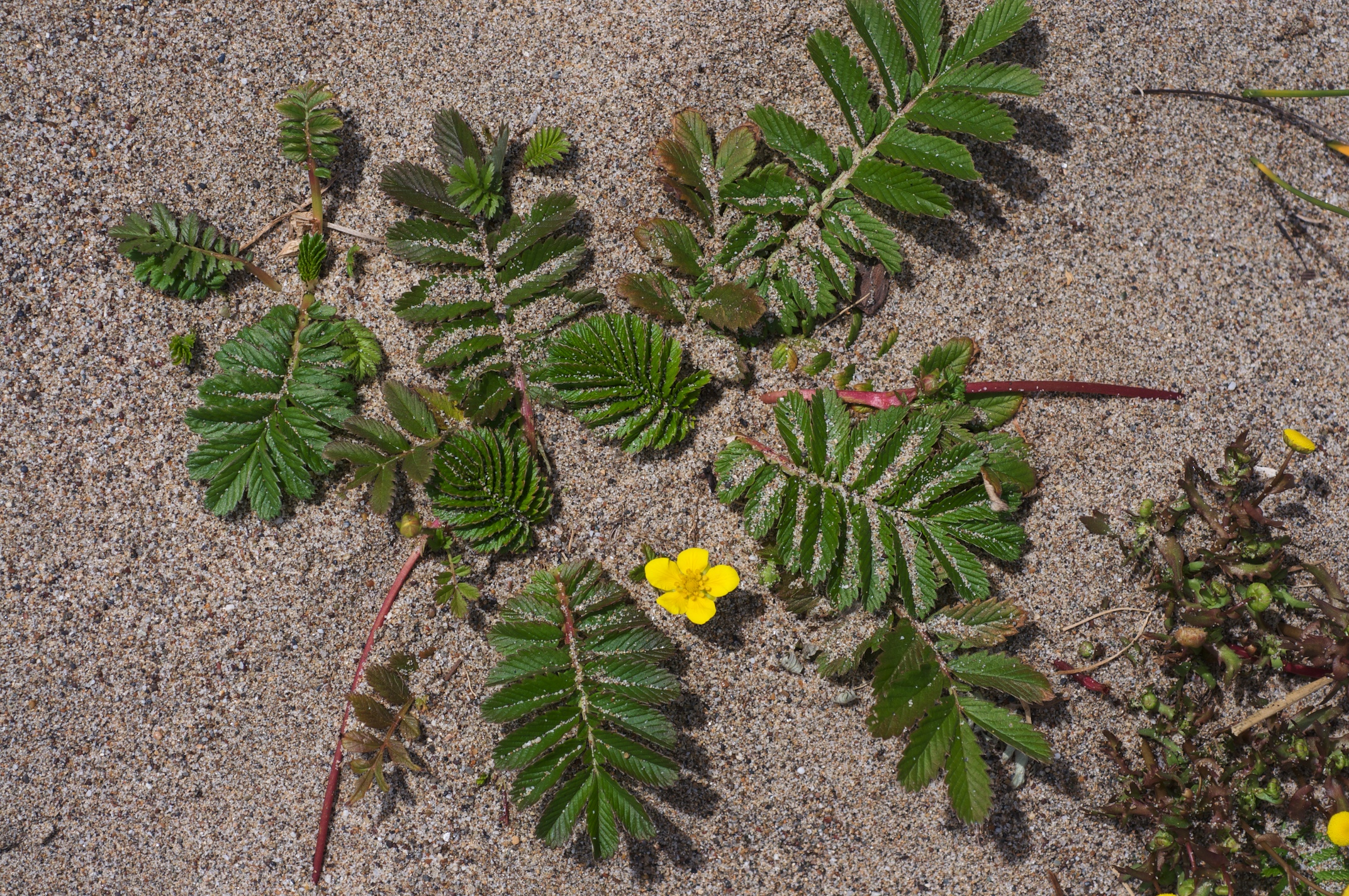

Scientific classification
- Kingdom: Plantae
- Clade: Embryophytes
- Clade: Tracheophytes
- Clade: Spermatophytes
- Clade: Angiosperms
- Clade: Eudicots
- Clade: Rosids
- Order: Rosales
- Family: Rosaceae
- Genus: Argentina
- Species: A. egedei

Binomial name
- Argentina egedei (Wormsk.) Rydb.

Synonyms
- Argentina anserina subsp. egedei Potentilla anserina subsp. egedei Potentilla egedei

= Argentina egedei =

Species of flowering plant

Argentina egedei, known as Eged's silverweed, is a flowering perennial plant in the rose family, Rosaceae. It is also sometimes called "Pacific silverweed", though this usually (and more precisely) refers to A. pacifica.

== Description ==
Eged's silverweed is a low-growing herbaceous plant with creeping red stolons up to 80 centimetres (31 in) long. The leaves are 10–40 cm (4–15 1/2 in) long, evenly pinnate into in crenate leaflets 3–5 cm (1 1/4–2 in) long and 2 cm (0.79 in) broad, thinly covered with a few silky white trichomes (called hairs). The sparsity of the hairs is a useful distinction from A. anserina, which is more densely hairy.

The flowers are produced singly on 5–15 cm (2.0–5.9 in) long stems, 2–3.5 cm (0.79–1.38 in) diameter with five yellow petals. The fruit is a cluster of dry achenes.

== Taxonomy ==
It was formerly classified in the genus Potentilla as Potentilla egedei. It is considered a member of the Argentina anserina species aggregate, or is alternatively treated as a subspecies of A. anserina by some botanists, including the Plants of the World Online database.

== Distribution and habitat ==
It is a halophyte native to Arctic and cool temperate coasts of the Northern Hemisphere, most commonly growing in salt marshes. The southern limits of the range are California and Long Island, New York in North America, and the Baltic Sea and coastal eastern Siberia in Eurasia.

== Traditional Uses ==
Traditionally used as a root vegetable by Indigenous peoples of the Pacific Northwest Coast, including the Kwakwakaʼwakw, Nuu-chah-nulth, and Coast Salish peoples. The edible roots were harvested and commonly pit-cooked or boiled, and in some cases dried or processed for storage. The species was also cultivated in managed estuarine root gardens, where communities maintained and enhanced silverweed patches through practices such as tilling, selective harvesting, weeding, and the construction of garden features, treating the plant as part of long-term managed landscapes rather than as a purely wild resource.
