= Qualicum National Wildlife Area =

National Wildlife Area on Vancouver Island in British Columbia, Canada

- IUCN category Ia (strict nature reserve)
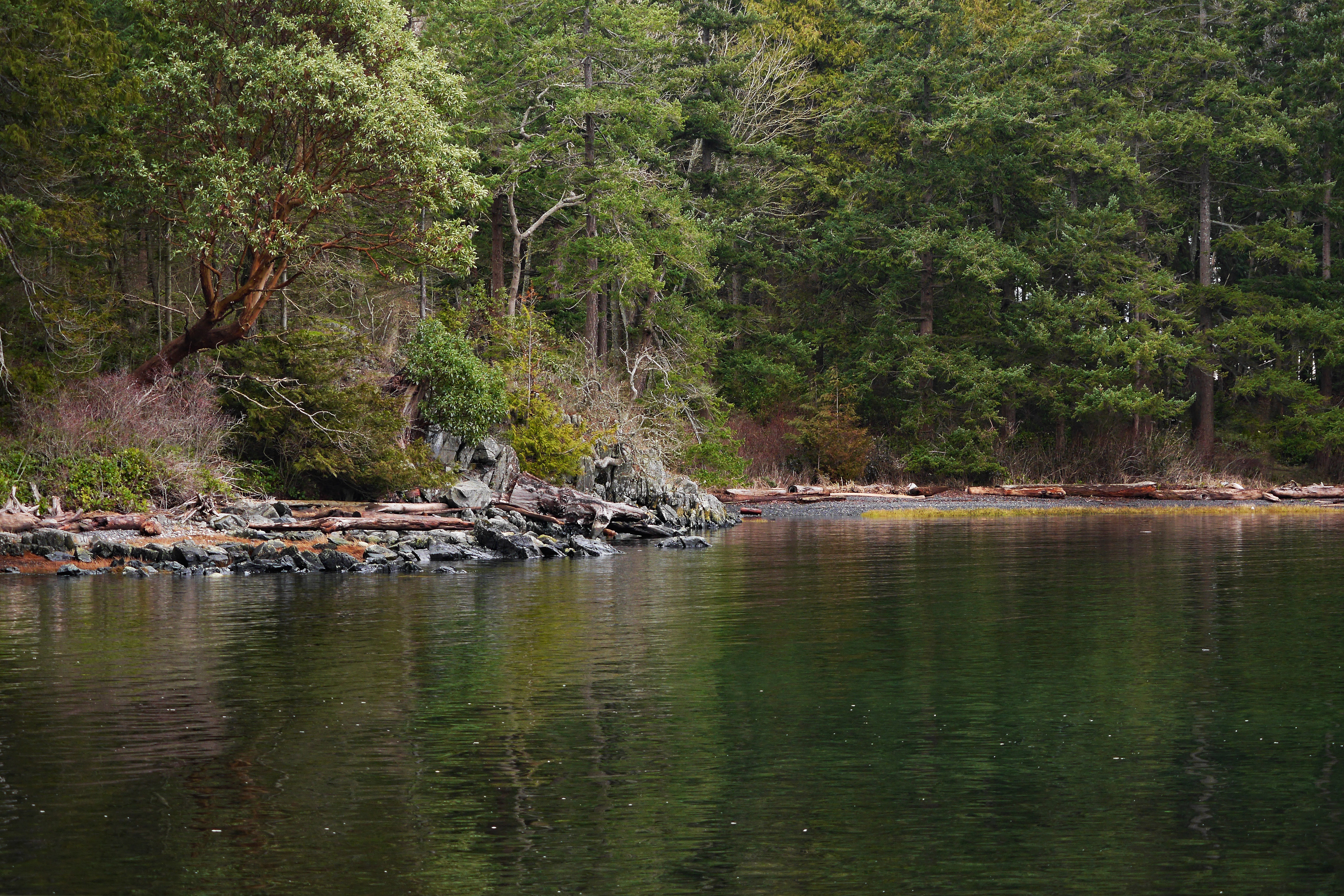
- Arbutus and Douglas fir growing along the shores of Nanoose Bay

- Location within Vancouver Island Location within British Columbia Location within Regional District of Nanaimo
- Location: Nanaimo RD, British Columbia, Canada
- Coordinates: 49°22′00″N 124°29′30″W
- Area: 78 ha (190 acres)
- Designation: National Wildlife Area
- Established: 1977
- Governing body: Canadian Wildlife Service
- Website: Qualicum NWA

The Qualicum National Wildlife Area (NWA) was officially established in 1977, under the Canada Wildlife Act (1973). The primary objective of the Qualicum NWA was to conserve crucial habitats for migratory birds and various other species.

The national wildlife area consists of three small units - Rosewall Creek, Marshall-Stevenson, and Nanoose Bay - spread out along the northeastern coast Vancouver Island between the communities of Fanny Bay and Nanoose Bay.

Since it is a National Wildlife Area (NWA), Qualicum NWA is governed by the Canada Wildlife Act and managed by the Canadian government department Environment and Climate Change Canada. While most National Wildlife Areas are closed to the public to reduce the human impacts on the land, vegetation, animals, and insects, the Qualicum NWA is open for certain recreational activities, such as wildlife viewing and hiking as well as hunting in certain areas.

== Topography ==
The Qualicum National Wildlife Area (NWA) is situated on the Nanaimo lowland, which is a stretch of land that lies above the Jordan River, west of Victoria, and stretches up to the Johnstone Strait. The topography of the Qualicum National Wildlife Area (NWA) consists of both coastal and land ecosystems. The land ecosystems found in the Qualicum NWA are upland meadows, whereas the coastal ecosystems include intertidal marsh habitats, and estuarine ecosystems, which take up 82 hectares. Coastal Douglas-fir forests are also located in the Qualicum NWA, only being found in 0.3 percent of the province. These Ecosystems make a habitat for many organisms, including several endangered species. The area has a meadow/arbutus system.

== Indigenous background ==
The Qualicum NWA resides on the lands of the Coast Salish First Nations, specifically, the Qualicum First Nations. The name "Qualicum" means "where the dog salmon run". Traditionally, in the fall, Indigenous nations across Canada would gather in Qualicum to catch dog salmon. The Qualicum First Nations' diet also traditionally included abalone, oysters, geoducks and horse and butter clams. The Qualicum First Nations still reside on the land in Qualicum beach.

=== Involvement in management ===
Two BC Parks management plans related to the Qualicum NWA did not mention consultation with the Coast Salish First Nations, although one plan includes intentions to consult the first nations to develop "cultural inventory":

- Little Qualicum Falls Park management plan (1989) (adjacent to the Marshall-Stevenson unit): no mention of First Nations.
- Rosewall Creek Park purpose statement and zoning plan (2003): acknowledged a "[l]ack of detailed knowledge of natural and cultural values" with the response including, "Include First Nations in development of cultural inventory."

== Species ==
=== Plant species ===
Plant species in Qualicum NWA
Nanoose-Bonell Estuary	Marshall-Stevenson Estuary
Some of Nanoose-Bonell Estuary's dominant plant species from 1986.: Distichlis spicata; Glaux maritima; Salicornia virginica; Triglochin maritimum; Agrostis sp.; Plantago maritima; Atriplex patula; Carex lyngbyei; Juncus balticus; Potentilla pacifica	Some vegetation communities in the Marshall-Stevenson Estuary (and nearby in the Little Qualicum River estuary, in 1982).: Ruppia group: Ruppia maritima; Ranunculus group: Ranunculus cymbalaria; Glaux group: Glaux maritima and Triglochin maritima; Carex group: Carex lyngbyei, Potentilla pacifica, Agrostis sp., and Eleocharis palustris; Juncus group: Juncus balticus, Deschampsia cespitosa, Trifolium wormskioldii, and Poa pratensis; Rosa group: Rosa nutkana, Fritillaria camschatcensis, Bromus mollis, and Hypochaeris radicata

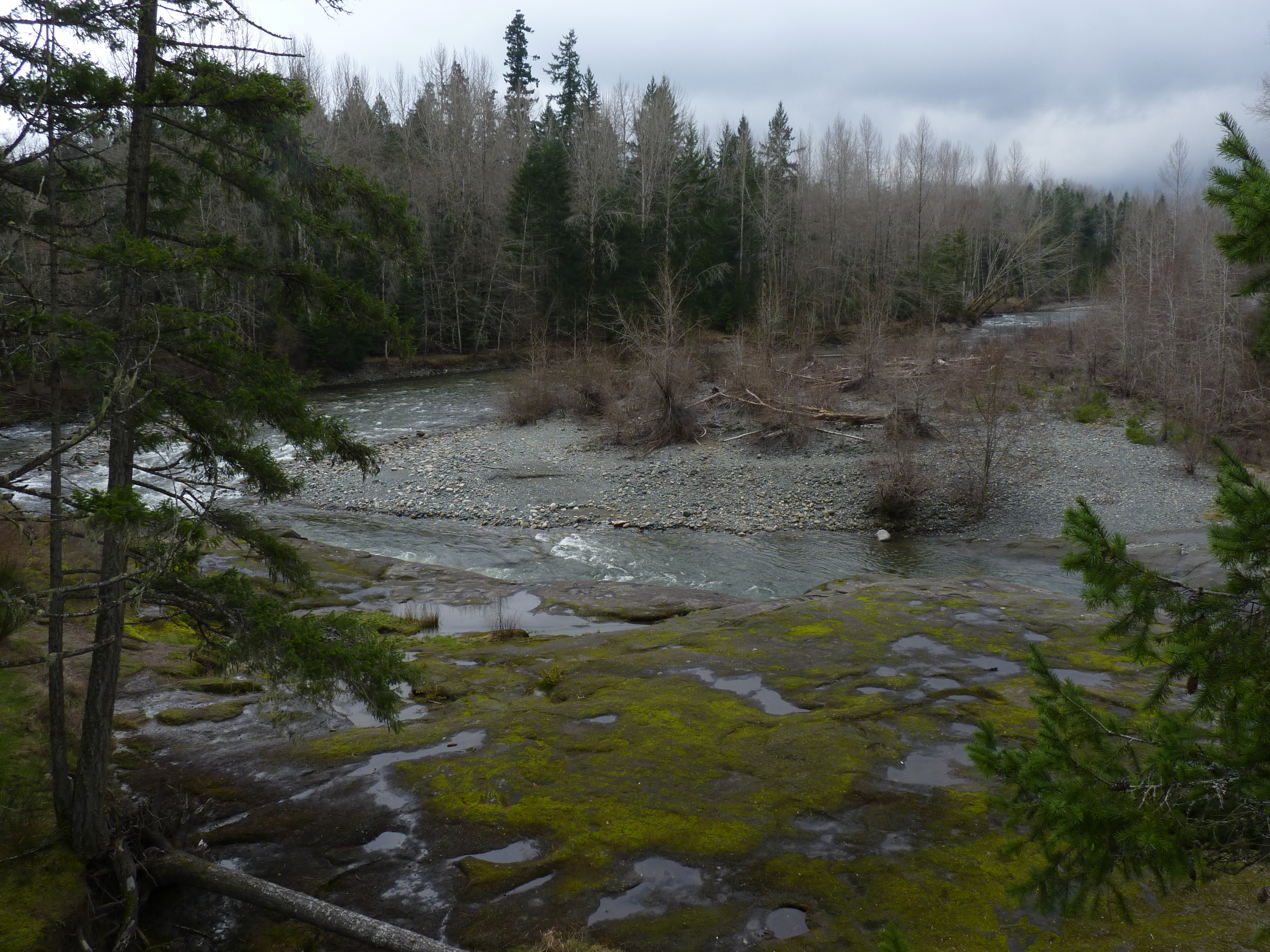
Nearby protected habitat area near Parksville, British Columbia.

=== Invasive species ===
Reed canary grass is one of the invasive species in the Qualicum National Park. Reed canary grass is dominant to the understory. Reed canary grass is not native to British Columbia and is originally from temperate parts of Europe and Asia. It was brought to BC likely through cultivar in the 1800s, and then spread to Qualicum through rhizomes. The grass finds the Qualicum area favorable because it needs long daylight hours for flowering and it thrives in areas with wet soil adjacent to rivers and streams. However, as an invasive species, it reduces biodiversity by occupying much of the ground cover.

Invasive knotweed is also an invasive plant that prefers wet areas near streams. The city of Qualicum is concerned with both Japanese Knotweed and Giant Hogweed. The plant is outcompeting native species and is also difficult to eradicate because the roots will fragment and grow into new plants when attempting to dig them up. Knotweed was initially brought from East Asia as an ornamental gardening plant in 1901 but it propagates easily and becomes dominant. Giant Hogweed seeds remain viable in the soil for up to 15 years. The leaves and stems themselves contain a toxic sap that has averse effects when brought into contact with skin.

The primary method way to remove invasive knotweed plants is through herbicide, which Parks Canada implements in addition to other control methods like biological, mechanical and chemical. Chemical methods are only considered for plants with long viability periods in soil.

=== Endangered species ===
The diverse biotic environment includes many species, including over 60 water bird species. The aviary population includes endangered species such as the great blue heron. The birds are removing 3% of fish heading out to the Salish sea. The herons live in woodlands adjacent to estuaries, but they are very sensitive to human activity and can abandon their nests if people come too close.

Qualicum NWA contains Garry oak ecosystem, the only oak species native to British Columbia. These oaks are rapidly dwindling due to habitat loss in many of the places they are found. Within these ecosystems, the soil is dark and rich, benefitting herbaceous understory vegetation. The ecosystems are thought to have upwards of a hundred plant and animal species. The Garry Oaks are drought resistant plants with leaves that prevent a lot of water loss.

== Tourism ==
About a 20 minute drive from Qualicum NWA is Qualicum Beach, a popular tourist destination. The attraction prides itself on their extensive beaches, forests and wildlife though the area has undergone much more human intervention than Qualicum NWA.

Hunting is not permitted at most of the NWA except waterfowl such as Brant geese which may be hunted at the Rosewall Creek unit. The necessary permits but be obtained in order to hunt.

== See also ==
- List of National Wildlife Areas in Canada
- Mount Arrowsmith Biosphere Region
