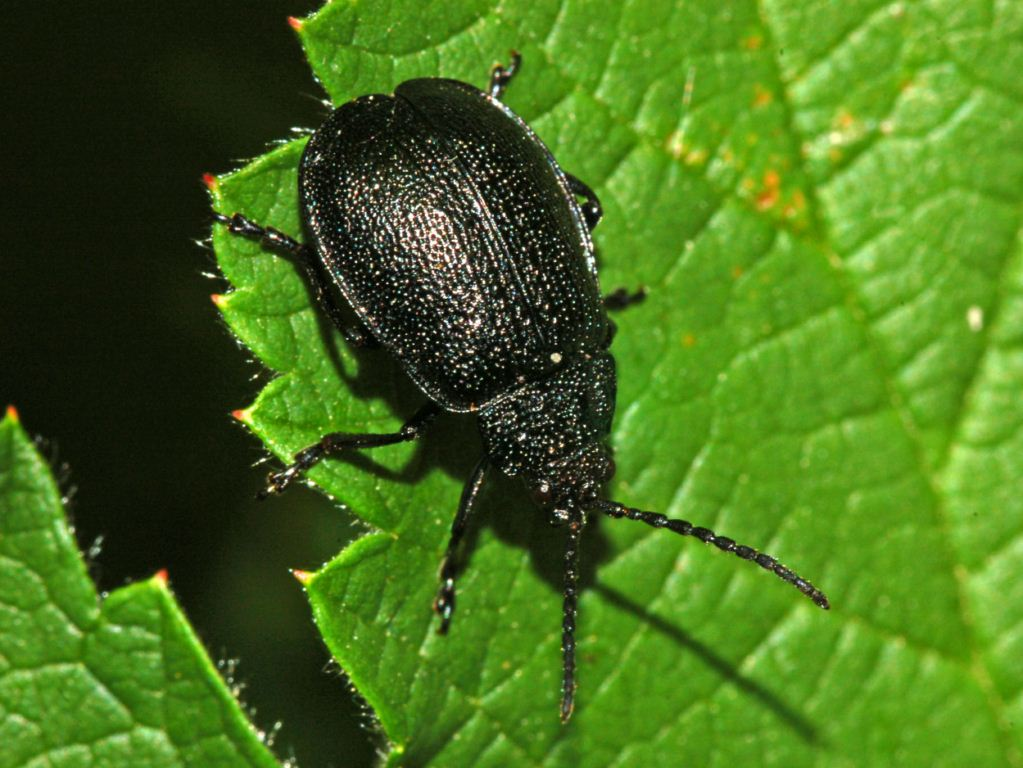
- Dorsal view
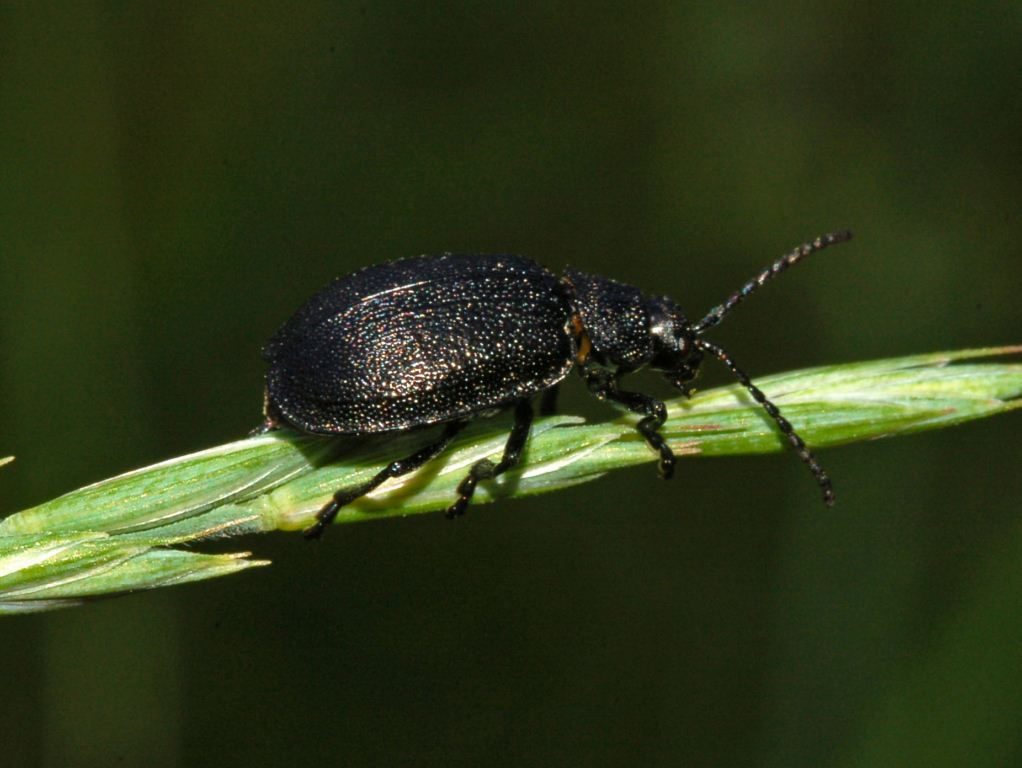
- Lateral view

Scientific classification
- Kingdom: Animalia
- Phylum: Arthropoda
- Class: Insecta
- Order: Coleoptera
- Suborder: Polyphaga
- Infraorder: Cucujiformia
- Family: Chrysomelidae
- Subfamily: Galerucinae
- Tribe: Galerucini
- Genus: Galeruca
- Species: G. tanaceti

Binomial name
- Galeruca tanaceti (Linnaeus, 1758)

= Galeruca tanaceti =

Species of beetle

Galeruca tanaceti is a species of leaf beetle found in the Palearctic realm, and is the type species of the genus Galeruca. It feeds on various plants in both its adult and larval stages. The species was first described by Carl Linnaeus in his 1758 10th edition of Systema Naturae.

== Distribution ==
This species is present in the Palearctic realm from Portugal to Japan. It is also present in the Near East and North Africa. It has been introduced to northern America.

== Habitat ==
These beetles inhabit dry and sunny areas, meadows and grassy places.

== Description ==
Galeruca tanaceti can reach a length of 6–11 millimetres (0.24–0.43 in). These leaf beetles have a broadly ovate, convex and glabrous body. The head, pronotum and elytra are matt black and densely punctured. The lateral margins of the elytra are explanate. The legs are entirely black, relatively long and slender.

The females are longer than the males. At the time of oviposition the abdomen is greatly enlarged and filled with eggs so much that the elytra cover just one half of the length of the belly. The larvae are dark and covered with bristles on fleshy outgrowths.

== Biology ==
Adults can be found between June and August persisting until October. Eggs are laid during September or October. They are attached to a leaf, a stem or flowers of dry grasses and other herbaceous plants and are protected by the secretion of these beetle. The larvae emerge only after the winter, at the end of April and during May. Pupation occurs in the ground during late May or June.

Beetles and larvae are polyphagous, feeding on Asteraceae (Tanacetum vulgare, Achillea millefolium, Centaurea nigra, Tussilago, Cirsium arvense), Brassicaceae (Cardamine pratensis, Sinapis arvensis) and other plants (especially Argentina anserina, Succisa pratensis, Scabiosa columbaria, Thymus serpyllum, Veronica and Hypericum perforatum).

These beetles have been reported as a pest on oregano in Crete.

Eggs have been observed being parasitized by Oomyzus galerucivorus (Hymenoptera: Eulophidae).

== Gallery ==
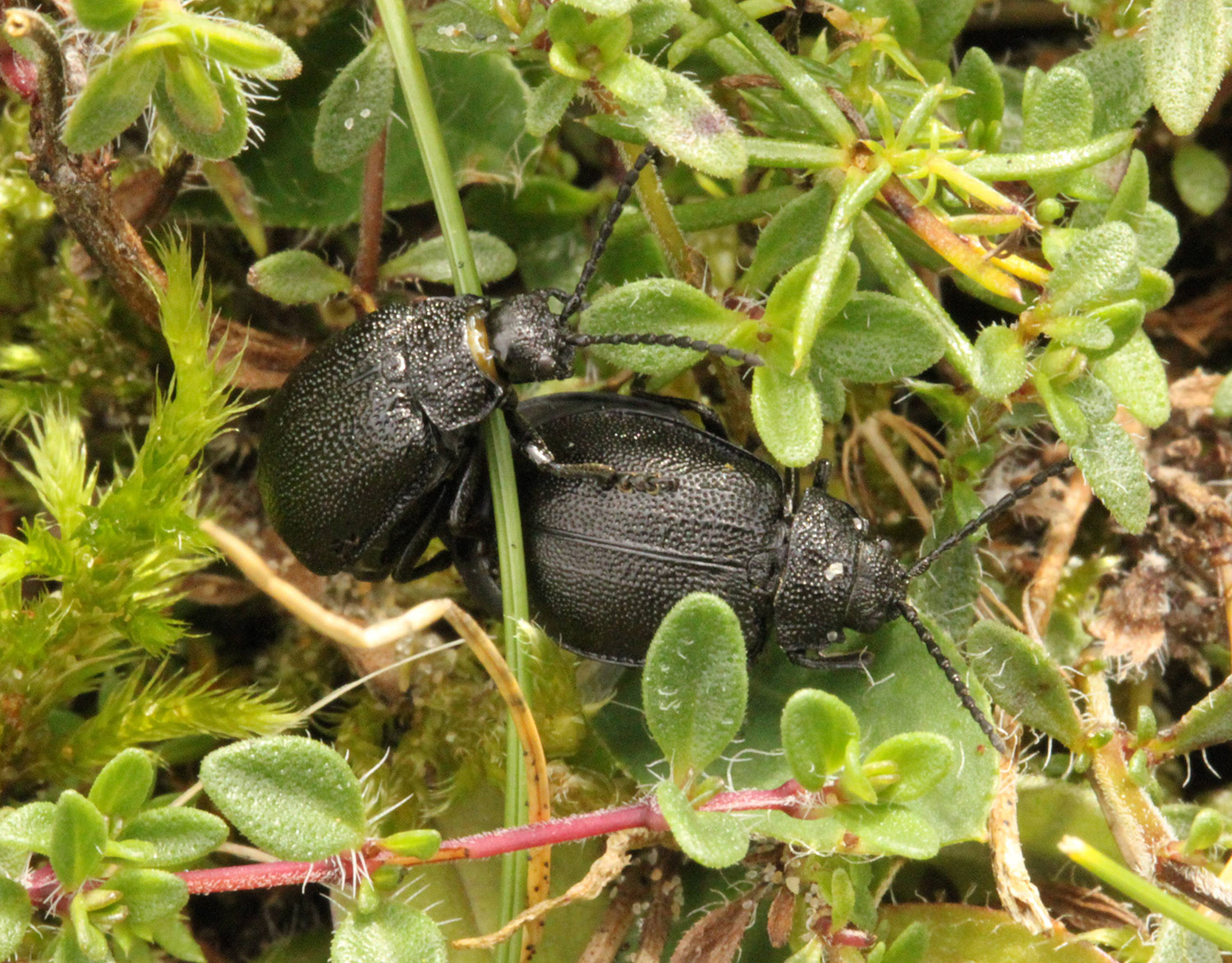
Mating

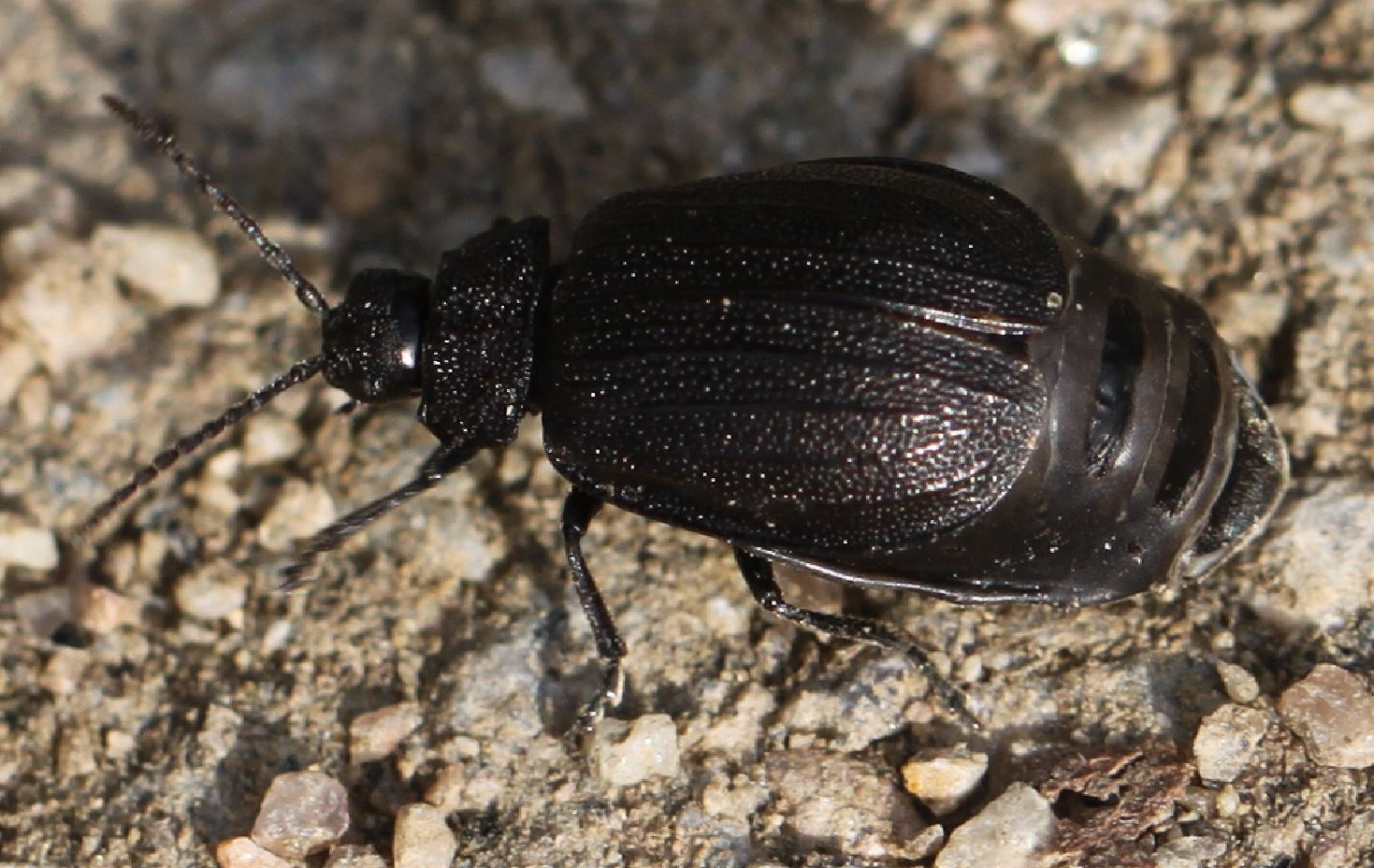
Female of Galeruca tanaceti

Clip on a female in a meadow
