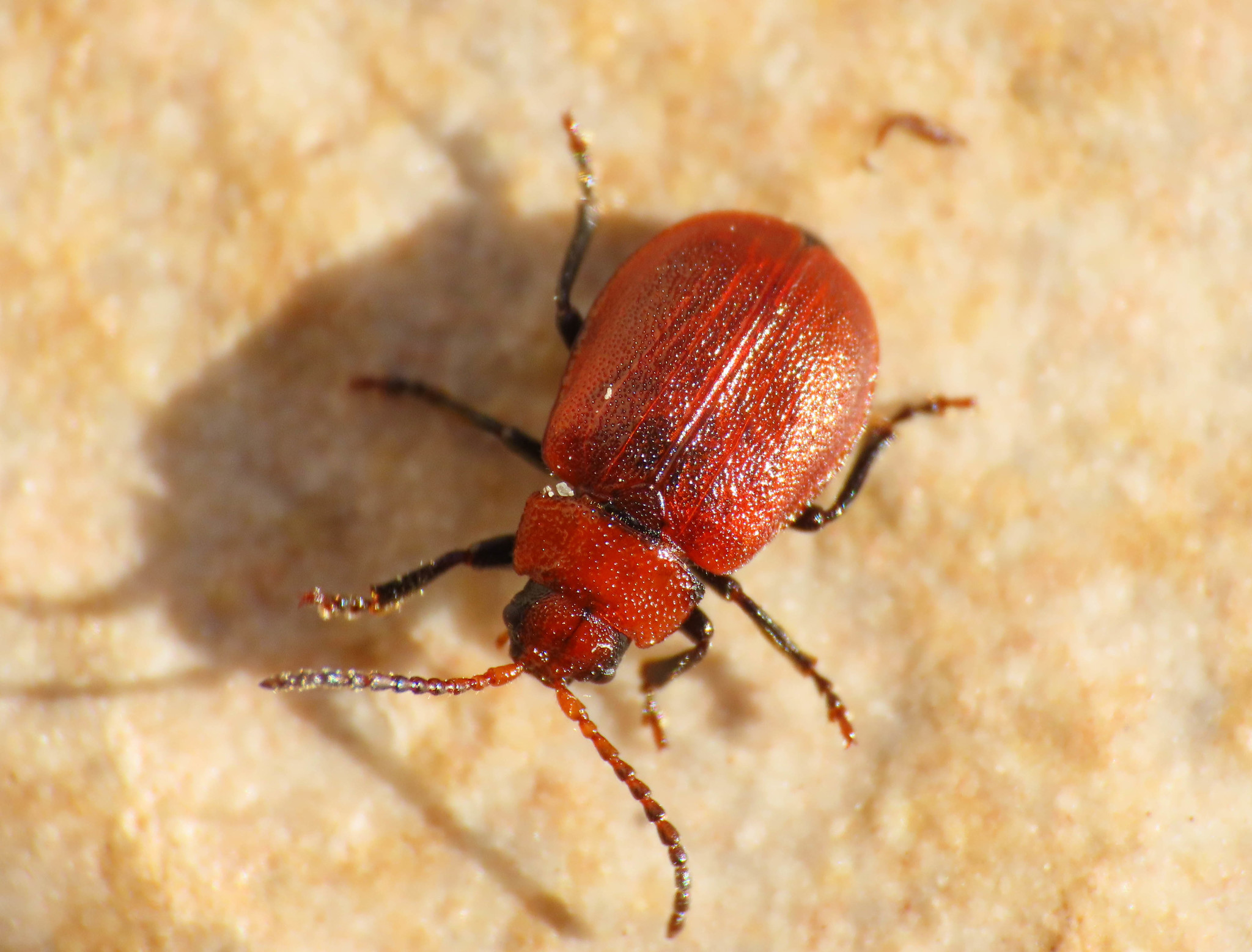

Scientific classification
- Kingdom: Animalia
- Phylum: Arthropoda
- Clade: Pancrustacea
- Class: Insecta
- Order: Coleoptera
- Suborder: Polyphaga
- Infraorder: Cucujiformia
- Family: Chrysomelidae
- Subfamily: Galerucinae
- Tribe: Galerucini
- Genus: Galeruca
- Species: G. rufa

Binomial name
- Galeruca rufa Germar, 1824

= Galeruca rufa =

Species of beetle

Galeruca rufa is a species of leaf beetle native to Europe.

It has been observed defoliating Convolvulus arvensis L. (field bindweed). G. rufa appears to feed only on the genera Convolvulus and Calystegia.

Studies were halted on this species when it was determined to reproduce successfully on several North American sweet potato varieties.
