= Stolon =

Horizontal connections between organisms

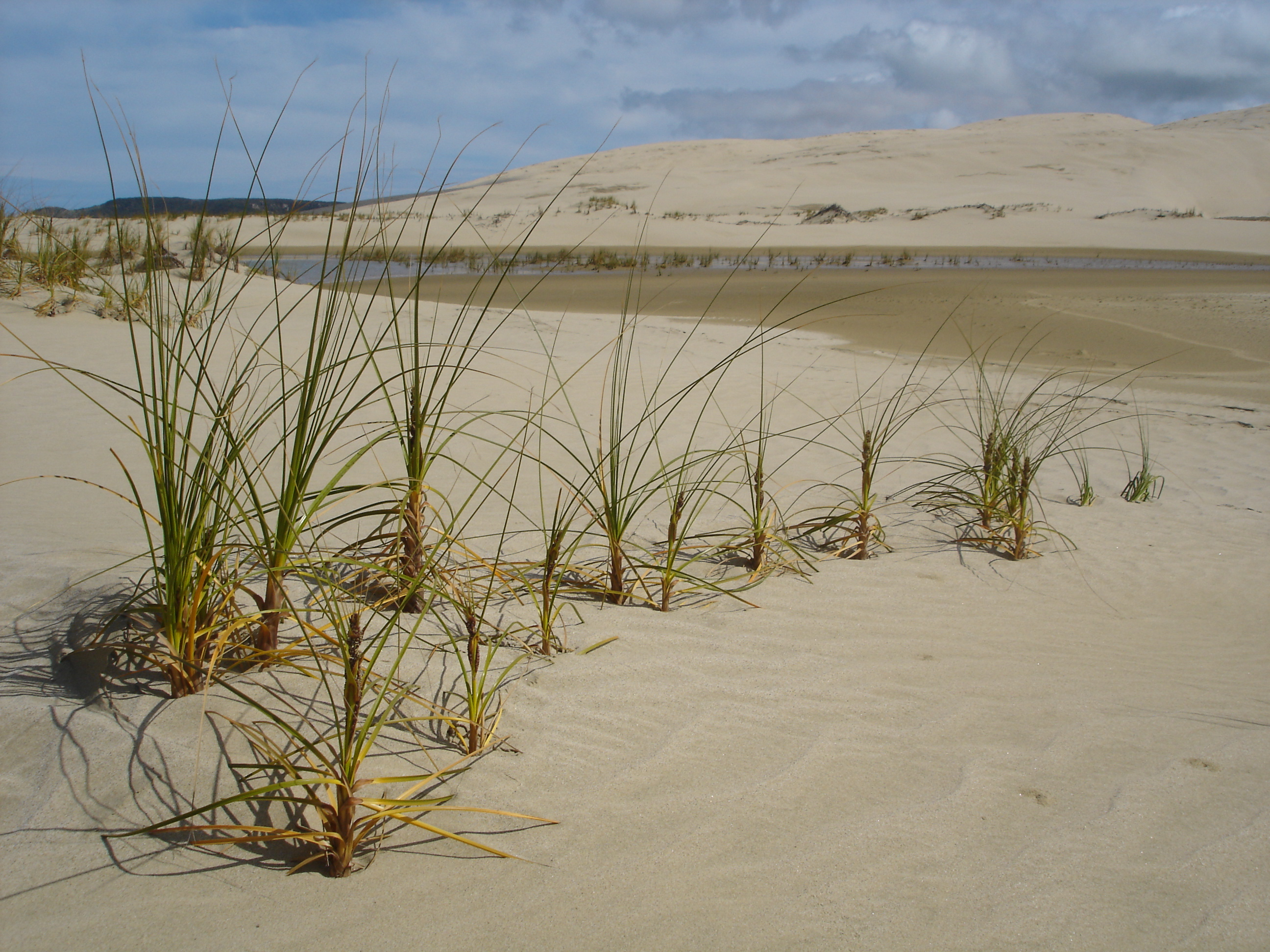
Ficinia spiralis (pīngao) spreads by forming stolons in the sand.

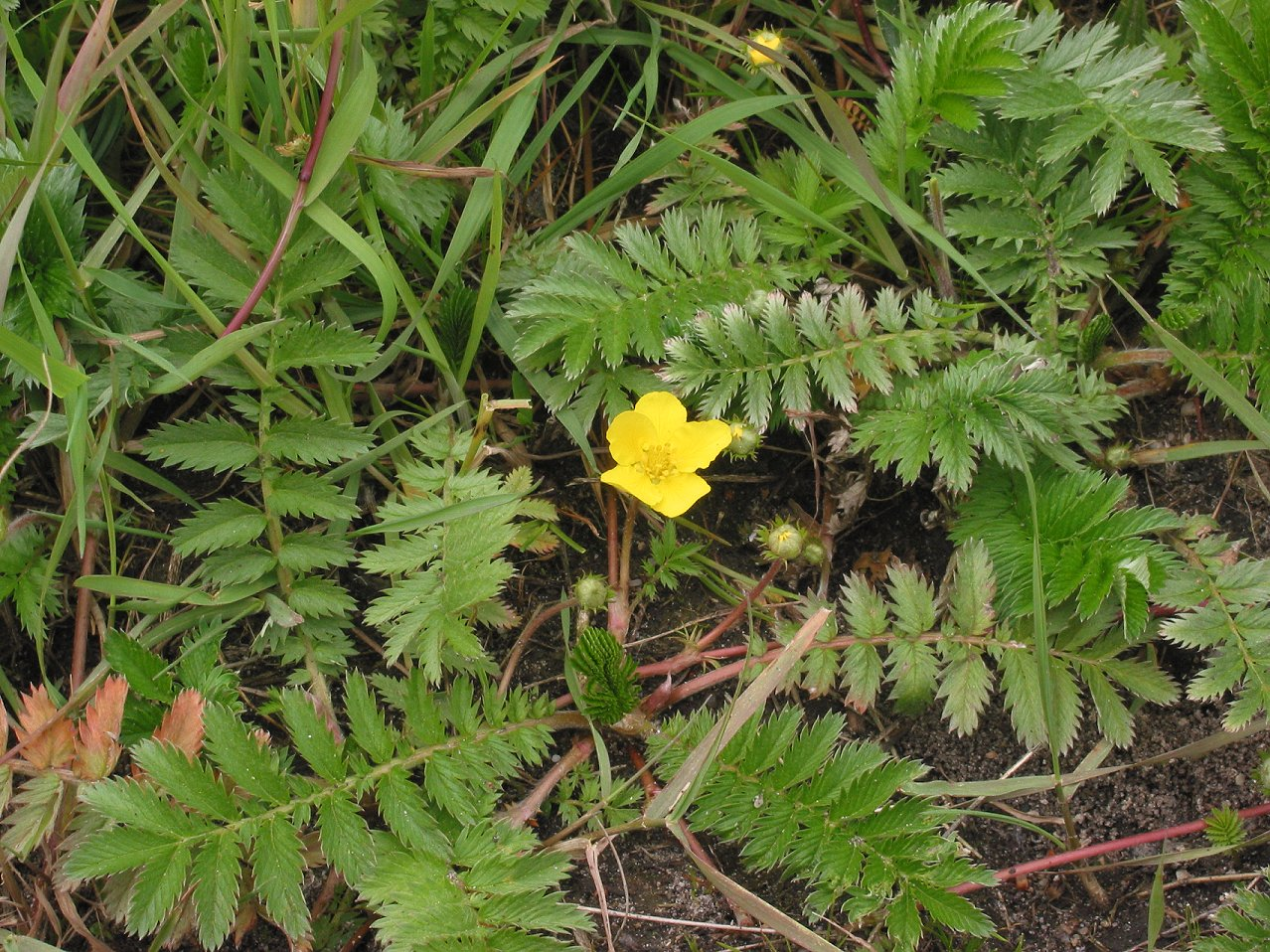
Argentina anserina (common silverweed) showing red stolons

In biology, a stolon (/ˈstoʊlɒn/ from Latin stolō, genitive stolōnis – "branch"), also known as a runner, is a horizontal connection between parts of an organism. It may be part of the organism, or of its skeleton. Typically, animal stolons are exoskeletons (external skeletons).

== In botany ==
In botany, stolons are plant stems which grow at the soil surface or just below ground that form adventitious roots at the nodes, and new plants from the buds. Stolons are often called runners. Rhizomes, in contrast, are root-like stems that may either grow horizontally at the soil surface or in other orientations underground. Thus, not all horizontal stems are called stolons. Plants with stolons are called stoloniferous.

A stolon is a plant propagation strategy and the complex of individuals formed by a mother plant and all its clones produced from stolons form a single genetic individual, a genet.

=== Morphology ===
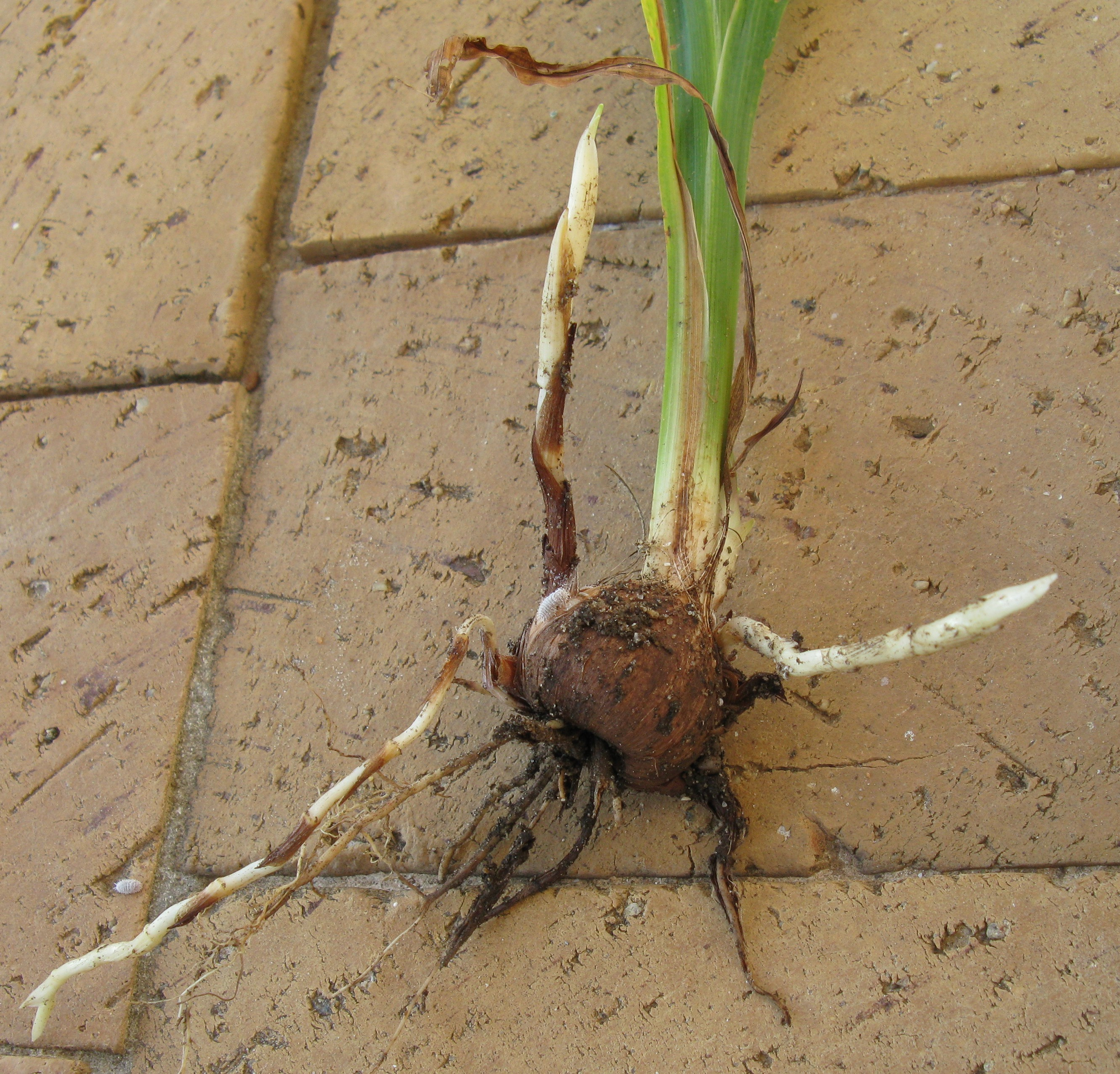
These stolons from the corm of a Crocosmia are stems that emerged from axillary buds at the nodes of the tunic leaves.

Stolons may have long or short internodes. The leaves along the stolon are usually very small, but in a few cases such as Stachys sylvatica are normal in size.

Stolons arise from the base of the plant. In strawberries the base is above the soil surface; in many bulb-forming species and plants with rhizomes, the stolons remain underground and form shoots that rise to the surface at the ends or from the nodes. The nodes of the stolons produce roots, often all around the node and hormones produced by the roots cause the stolon to initiate shoots with normal leaves. Typically after the formation of the new plant the stolon dies away in a year or two, while rhizomes persist normally for many years or for the life of the plant, adding more length each year to the ends with active growth. The horizontal growth of stolons results from the interplay of different hormones produced at the growing point and hormones from the main plant, with some studies showing that stolon and rhizome growth are affected by the amount of shady light the plant receives with increased production and branching from plants exposed to mixed shade and sun, while plants in all day sun or all shade produce fewer stolons.

A number of plants have soil-level or above-ground rhizomes, including Iris species and many orchid species.

T. Holm (1929) restricted the term rhizome to a horizontal, usually subterranean, stem that produces roots from its lower surface and green leaves from its apex, developed directly from the plumule of the embryo. He recognized stolons as axillary, subterranean branches that do not bear green leaves but only membranaceous, scale-like ones.

A stolon of grasses is defined as a horizontal stem above or on the soil surface that often roots at the internodes.

=== Plants with stolons ===
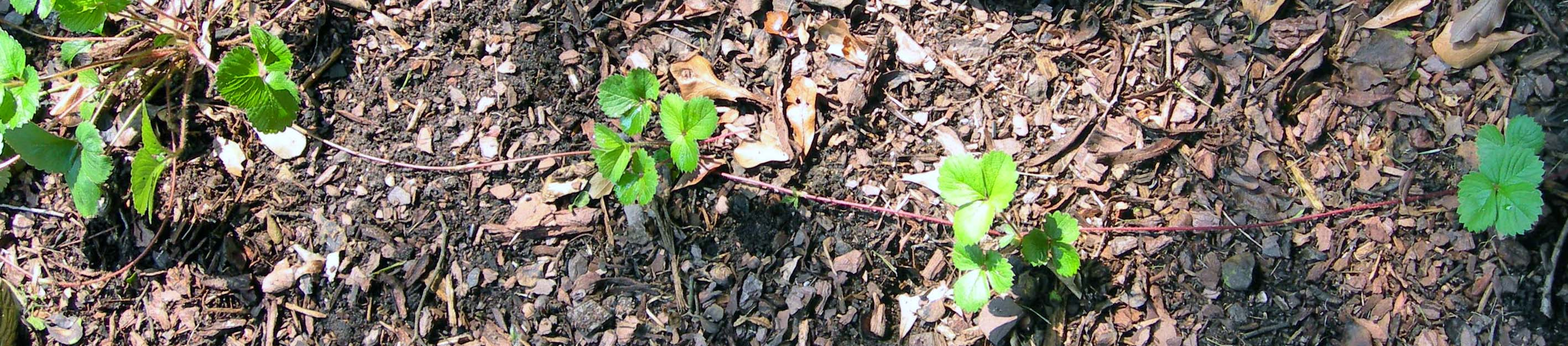
'Lipstick' hybrid strawberry (Comarum palustre × Fragaria × ananassa) growing new plants using vegetative propagation along stolons

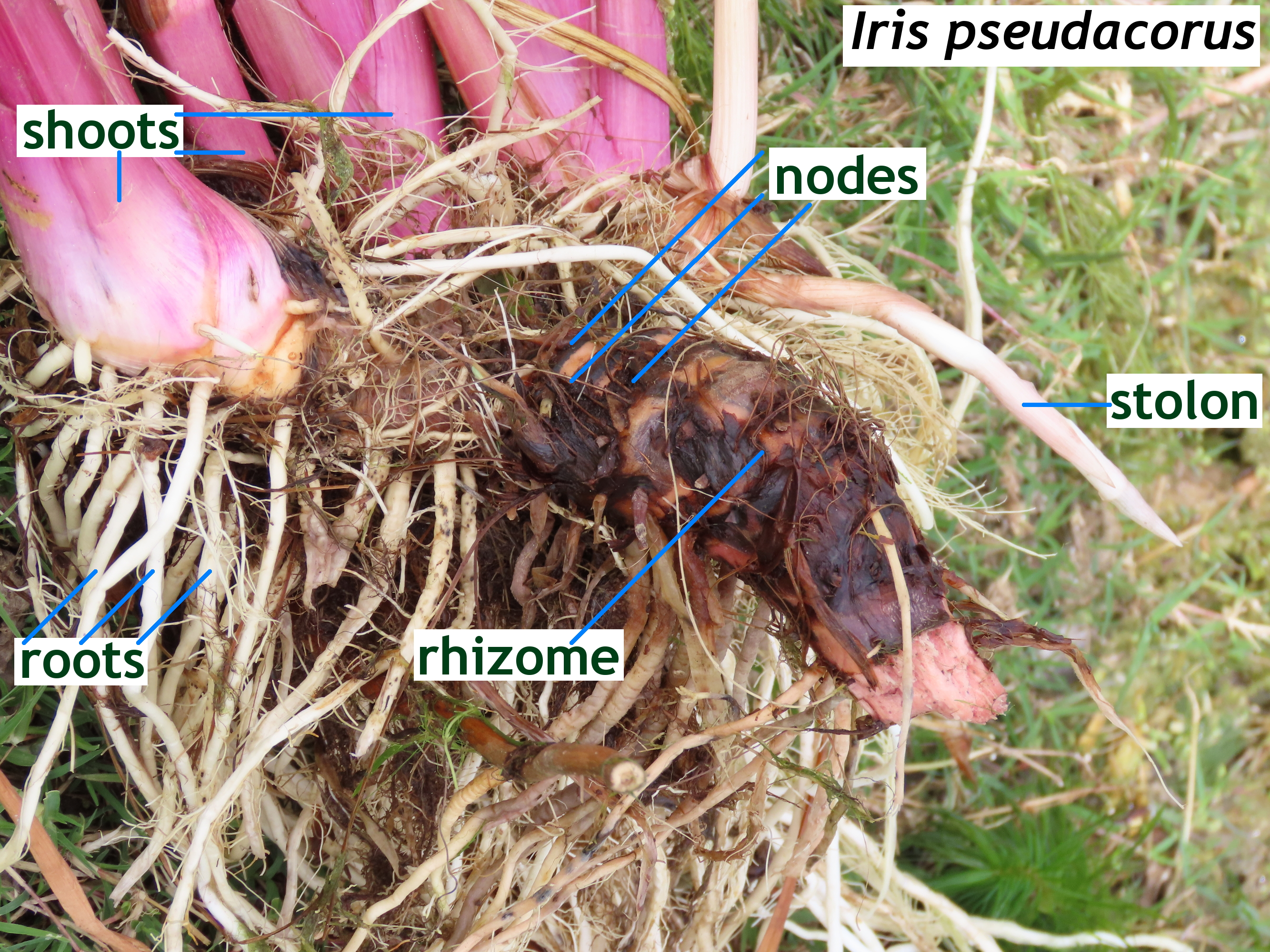
Iris pseudacorus

In some Cyperus species the stolons end with the growth of tubers; the tubers are swollen stolons that form new plants.

Some species of crawling plants can also sprout adventitious roots, but are not considered stoloniferous: a stolon is sprouted from an existing stem and can produce a full individual. Examples of plants that extend through stolons include some species from the genera Riccia, Argentina (silverweed), Cynodon, Fragaria, and Pilosella (Hawkweeds), Zoysia japonica, Ranunculus repens. Plants with long, slender stolons are referred to as sarmentose plants.

Other plants with stolons below the soil surface include many grasses, Ajuga, Mentha, and Stachys. Several species of Irises have stolons attached to their rhizomes, including Iris stolonifera.

Lily-of-the-valley (Convallaria majalis) has rhizomes that grow stolon-like stems called stoloniferous rhizomes or leptomorph rhizomes. A number of plants have stoloniferous rhizomes including Asters. These stolon-like rhizomes are long and thin, with long internodes and indeterminate growth with lateral buds at the node, which mostly remain dormant.

In potatoes, the stolons start to grow within 10 days of plants emerging above ground, with tubers usually beginning to form on the end of the stolons. The tubers are modified stolons that hold food reserves, with a few buds that grow into stems. Since it is not a rhizome it does not generate roots, but the new stem growth that grows to the surface produces roots. See also BBCH-scale (potato).

Hydrilla use stolons that produce tubers to spread themselves and to survive dry periods in aquatic habitats.

Erythronium, commonly called Trout Lily, have white stolons growing from the bulb. Most run horizontally, either underground or along the surface of the ground under leaf litter. A number of bulbous species produce stolons, such as Erythronium propullans. Flowering plants often produce no stolons.

Convolvulus arvensis is a weed species in agriculture that spreads by under ground stolons that produce rhizomes.

In studies on grass species, with plants that produce stolons or rhizomes and plants that produce both stolons and rhizomes, morphological and physiological differences were noticed. Stolons have longer internodes and function as means of seeking out light and are used for propagation of the plant, while rhizomes are used as storage organs for carbohydrates and the maintenance of meristem tissue to keep the parent plant alive from one year to the next.

== In mycology ==
In mycology, a stolon is defined as an occasionally septate hypha, which connects sporangiophores together. Root-like structures called rhizoids may appear on the stolon as well, anchoring the hyphae to the substrate. The stolon is commonly found in bread molds, and are seen as horizontally expanding across the mold.

== In zoology ==
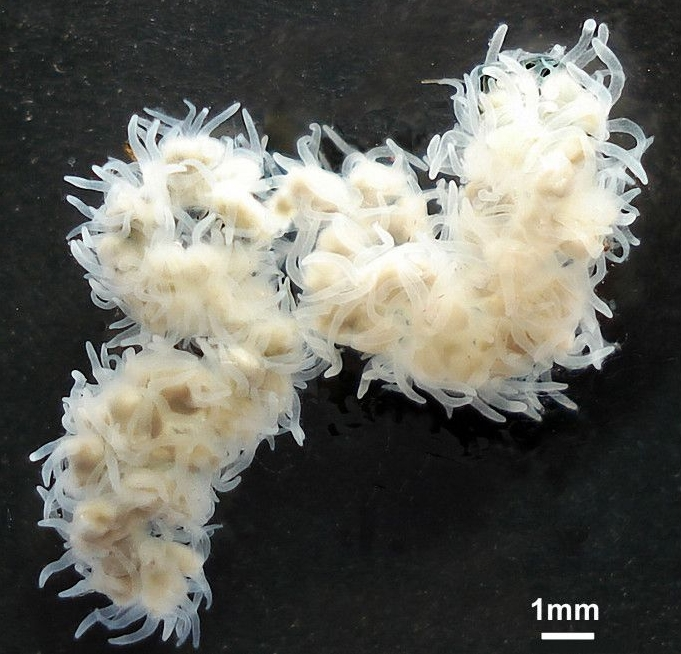
The Cnidarian fish parasite Polypodium hydriforme has a stolon stage of interconnected medusoids.

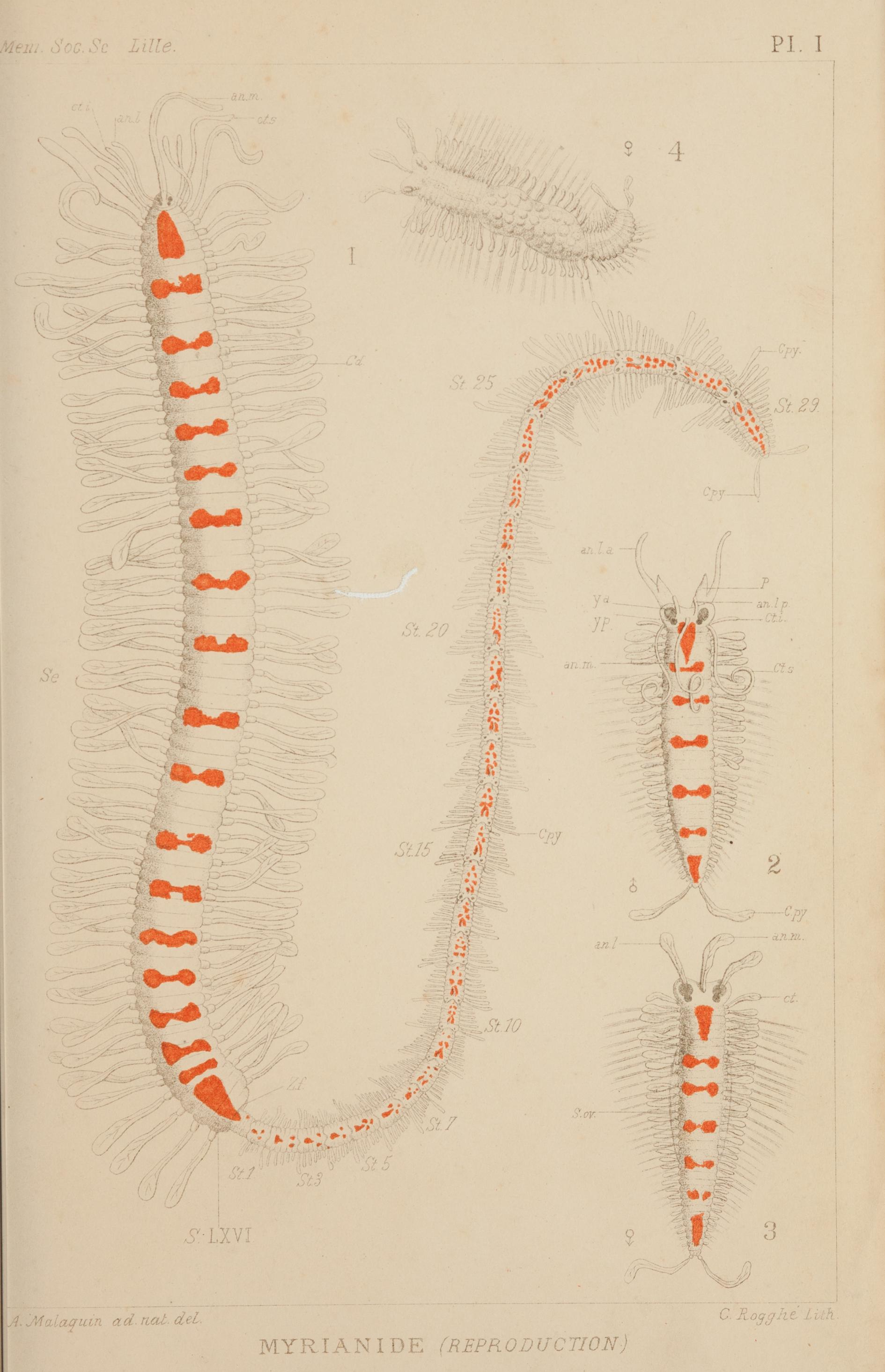
Members of the genus Myrianida in the Polychaeta, sometimes known as "trainworms", form stolons containing eggs or sperm.

Some bryozoans form colonies through the connection of individual units by stolons. Other colonies include sheets and erect colonies.

Some colonial Cnidaria develop as stolons with interconnected medusoid structures that later separate.

Some worm-like animals, such as certain Polychaeta in the genus Myrianida, form stolons containing eggs or sperm which trail behind the main body before detaching to mate with other stolons.

The worm Megasyllis nipponica takes this to an extreme, developing stolons with their own eyes, antennae, gut, and brain, which detach, seek out, and mate with an opposite-sex stolon to produce fertilized eggs.

== In palaeontology ==
Stolon-based reproduction is thought to have been used by Rangeomorphs in the Ediacaran period.

== See also ==
- Offshoot (plant) – Lateral growth branching from plant stem
- Root – Basal organ of a vascular plant
- Sprigging – Method for plant propagation
- Vegetative reproduction – Asexual method of reproduction in plants
