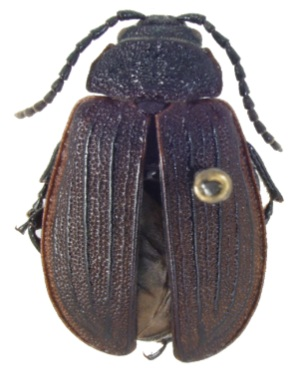

Scientific classification
- Kingdom: Animalia
- Phylum: Arthropoda
- Clade: Pancrustacea
- Class: Insecta
- Order: Coleoptera
- Suborder: Polyphaga
- Infraorder: Cucujiformia
- Family: Chrysomelidae
- Subfamily: Galerucinae
- Tribe: Galerucini
- Genus: Galeruca
- Species: G. rudis

Binomial name
- Galeruca rudis J. L. LeConte, 1857

= Galeruca rudis =

Species of beetle

Galeruca rudis is a species of skeletonizing leaf beetle in the family Chrysomelidae. It is found in North America, where it has been recorded from California and New Mexico to Yukon and British Columbia. This species is associated with various lupine species throughout its habitat.
