= Galeruca costatissima =

Scientific classification
- Kingdom: Animalia
- Phylum: Arthropoda
- Clade: Pancrustacea
- Class: Insecta
- Order: Coleoptera
- Suborder: Polyphaga
- Infraorder: Cucujiformia
- Family: Chrysomelidae
- Subfamily: Galerucinae
- Tribe: Galerucini
- Genus: Galeruca
- Species: G. costatissima

Binomial name
- Galeruca costatissima Blake, 1945

Species of beetle

Galeruca costatissima is a species of skeletonizing leaf beetle in the family Chrysomelidae. It is found in North America.
