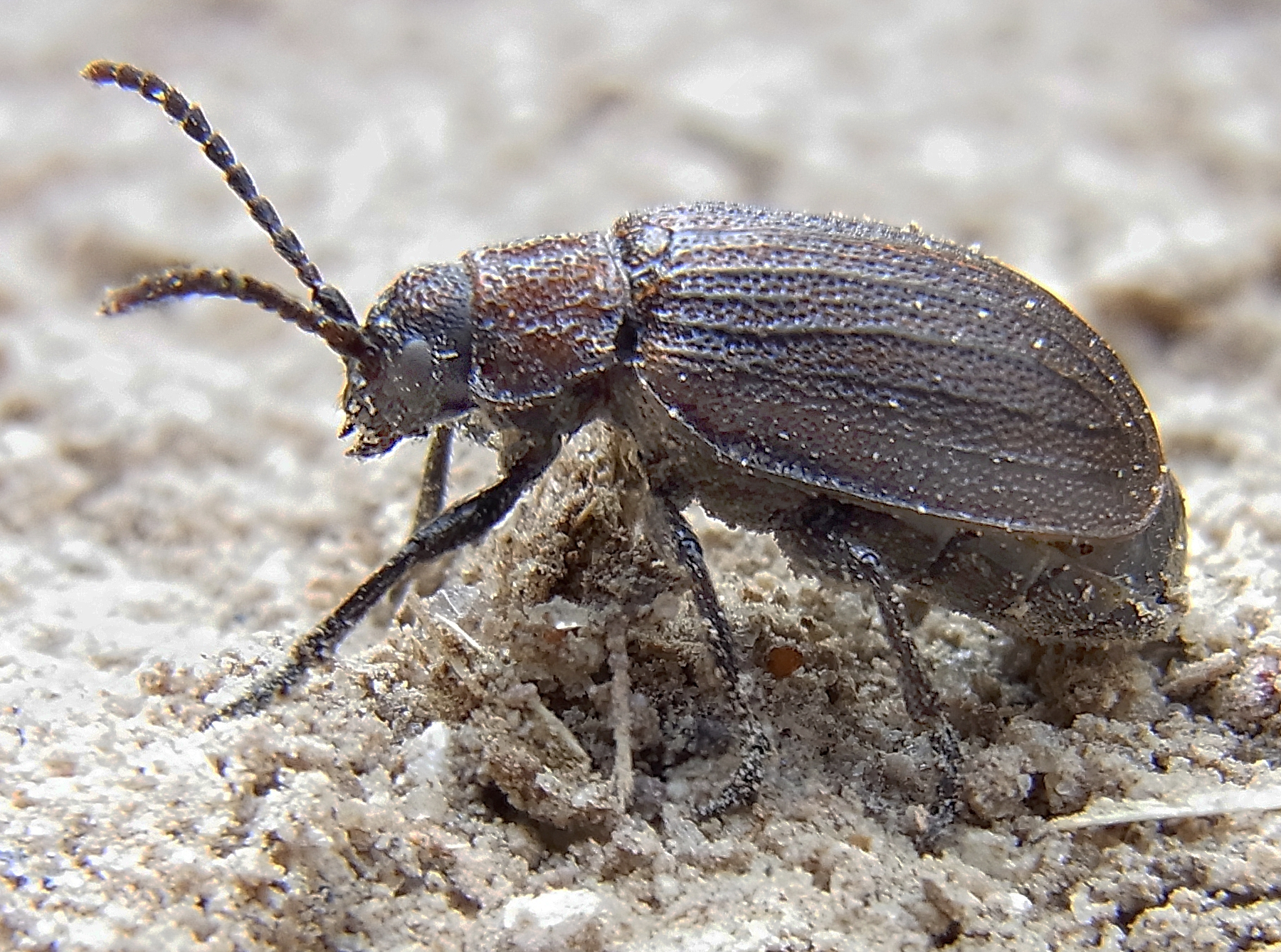

Scientific classification
- Kingdom: Animalia
- Phylum: Arthropoda
- Clade: Pancrustacea
- Class: Insecta
- Order: Coleoptera
- Suborder: Polyphaga
- Infraorder: Cucujiformia
- Family: Chrysomelidae
- Subfamily: Galerucinae
- Tribe: Galerucini
- Genus: Galeruca
- Species: G. pomonae

Binomial name
- Galeruca pomonae (Scopoli, 1763)

= Galeruca pomonae =

Species of beetle

Galeruca pomonae is a small species of leaf beetle native to Europe. It is polyphagous. It has been identified as a potential biological control agent of Dipsacus.
