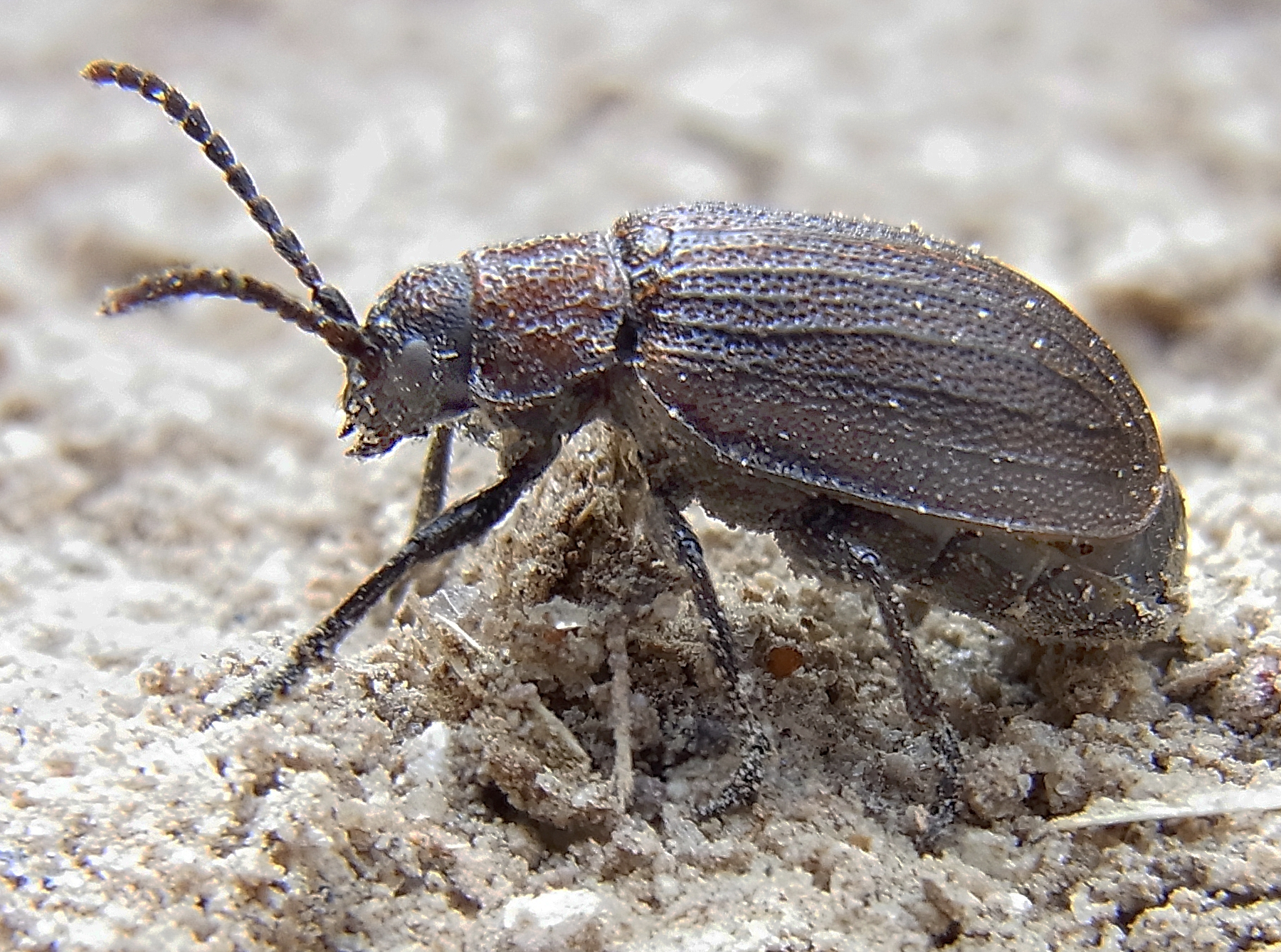
- Galeruca pomonae

Scientific classification
- Kingdom: Animalia
- Phylum: Arthropoda
- Clade: Pancrustacea
- Class: Insecta
- Order: Coleoptera
- Suborder: Polyphaga
- Infraorder: Cucujiformia
- Family: Chrysomelidae
- Tribe: Galerucini
- Genus: Galeruca; Geoffroy, 1762

Type species
- Chrysomela tanaceti Linnaeus, 1758

Synonyms
- Adimonia Laicharting, 1781; Galemira Beenen, 2003

= Galeruca =

Genus of beetles

Galeruca is a genus of leaf beetles in the subfamily Galerucinae. It is distributed in the Palaearctic and Nearctic realms. In Turkey, the genus is represented by 10 species.

== Species ==
Galeruca contains the following species, divided into seven subgenera:

Subgenus Galeruca Geoffroy, 1762:

- Galeruca abbreviata (Joannis, 1865)
- Galeruca altissima Chen & Jiang, 1981
- Galeruca angelae Havelka, 1958
- Galeruca angulicollis Kocher, 1959
- Galeruca angusta (Küster, 1849)
- Galeruca armeniaca Weise, 1886
- Galeruca artemisiae (Rosenhauer, 1956)
- Galeruca baetica Weise, 1891
- Galeruca barbara (Erichson, 1841)
- Galeruca barovskyi Jacobson, 1925
- Galeruca browni Blake, 1945
- Galeruca circassica Reitter, 1889
- Galeruca comaica Cheng & Jiang, 1981
- Galeruca corsica (Joannis, 1865)
- Galeruca costatissima Blake, 1945
- Galeruca dahlii (Joannis, 1865)
- Galeruca daurica (Joannis, 1865)
- Galeruca extensa (Motschulsky, 1862)
- Galeruca externa Say, 1824
- Galeruca goudoti (Joannis, 1865)
- Galeruca heydeni Weise, 1887
- Galeruca hunyadensis Csiki, 1953
- Galeruca hyrcana Medvedev & Mirzoevna, 1969
- Galeruca ida Havelka, 1956
- Galeruca impressicollis Pic, 1934
- Galeruca improvisa Havelka, 1956
- Galeruca indica Baly, 1878
- Galeruca interrupta Illiger, 1802
- Galeruca jucunda (Falderman, 1837)
- Galeruca laticollis Sahlberg, 1838
- Galeruca littoralis (Fabricius, 1787)
- Galeruca luctuosa (Joannis, 1865)
- Galeruca macchoi (Joannis, 1865)
- Galeruca nebrodensis Ragusa, 1887
- Galeruca nigrolineata Mannerheim, 1825
- Galeruca obscura (Joannis, 1865)
- Galeruca pallasia Jacobson, 1925
- Galeruca parallelipennis Beenen, 2002
- Galeruca planiuscula Laboissière, 1937
- Galeruca pomonae (Scopoli, 1763)
- Galeruca popenoei Blake, 1945
- Galeruca regularis Beenen & Yang, 2007
- Galeruca reichardti Jacobson, 1925
- Galeruca reichei (Joannis, 1865)
- Galeruca rudis J. L. LeConte, 1857
- Galeruca rugosa (Joannis, 1865)
- Galeruca sardosa (Gené, 1839)
- Galeruca sicana (Reiche, 1860)
- Galeruca sinensis Laboissière, 1937
- Galeruca spectabilis (Faldermann, 1837)
- Galeruca tanaceti (Linnaeus, 1758)
- Galeruca tripoliana (Chevrolat, 1873)
- Galeruca trubetzkoji Jacobson, 1925

Subgenus Emarhopa Weise, 1886

- Galeruca maculaticeps Pic, 1920
- Galeruca rufa Germar, 1824

Subgenus Fassatia Havelka, 1954

- Galeruca microptera Havelka, 1954

Subgenus Galerima Reitter, 1903

- Galeruca canigoensis Fauvel, 1892
- Galeruca miegii (Perez Arcas, 1874)
- Galeruca monticola (Kiesenwetter, 1850)
- Galeruca villiersi Berty & Rapilly, 1983

Subgenus Galerotoma Reitter, 1903

- Galeruca haagi (Joannis, 1865)

Subgenus Haptoscelis Weise, 1886

- Galeruca melanocephala (Ponza, 1805)
- Galeruca reitteri Havelka, 1958

Subgenus Rhabdotilla Jacobson, 1911 (formerly Galemira Beenen, 2003)

- Galeruca gyangzea Chen & Jiang, 1987
- Galeruca himalayensis Jacoby, 1896
- Galeruca holzschuhi (Mandl, 1981)
- Galeruca sexcostata Jacoby, 1904
- Galeruca zangana Chen & Jiang, 1987
