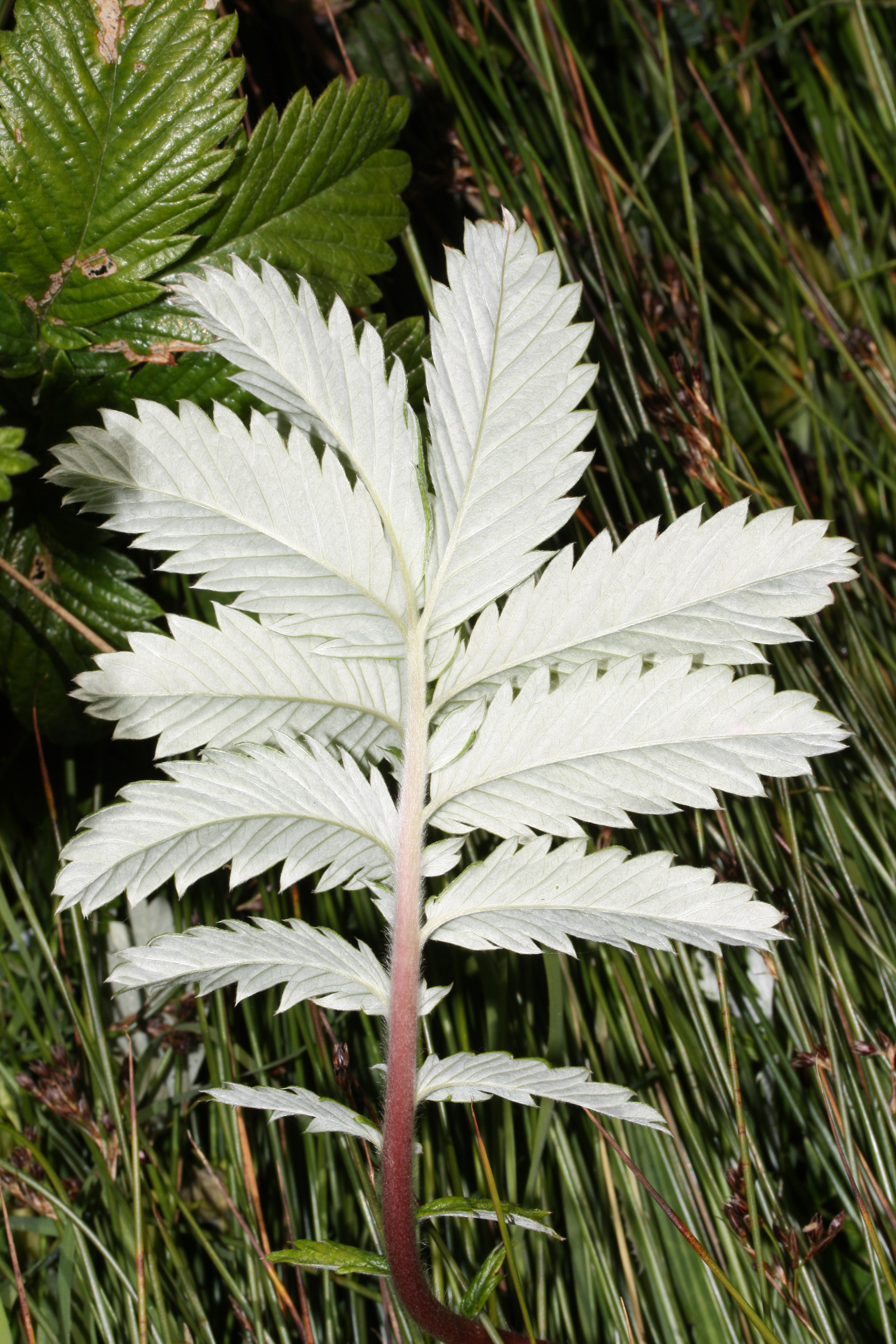

Scientific classification
- Kingdom: Plantae
- Clade: Embryophytes
- Clade: Tracheophytes
- Clade: Spermatophytes
- Clade: Angiosperms
- Clade: Eudicots
- Clade: Rosids
- Order: Rosales
- Family: Rosaceae
- Genus: Argentina
- Species: A. pacifica

Binomial name
- Argentina pacifica (Howell) Rydb.

Synonyms
- Potentilla pacifica Howell; Potentilla anserina subsp. pacifica (Howell) Rousi

= Argentina pacifica =

Species of flowering plant

Argentina pacifica, sometimes called pacific silverweed, silverweed cinquefoil, or simply silverweed, is a low-growing perennial plant with pinnate leaves and yellow flowers. The edible roots were valued by indigenous peoples of the Pacific Northwest Coast of North America and Canada.

== Description ==
It is a low-growing (15 cm or 6 in) perennial plant. It has pinnately compound green leaves with silvery undersides. The yellow, saucer-shaped flowers appear from late spring through summer.

== Taxonomy ==
The plant is a member of the species aggregate known as Argentina anserina or Potentilla anserina.

== Distribution and habitat ==
Pacific silverweed spreads very quickly in moist areas. Preferring salt marshes, river estuaries and shorelines, they are often seen growing alongside springbank clover. They need sun and regular water.

== Uses ==
Pacific silverweed is important in Pacific Northwest coastal indigenous cultures of North America and Canada. These Indigenous people dig for its edible roots. As an important vegetable, families maintained rights to access patches through potlatch. New plants can grow from small root fragments, and with some attention families could guarantee patches persisted for generations, perhaps over thousands of years. Northwest Coast peoples used to dig them in spring with yew-wood shovels before pit-cooking them or boiling them with eulachon grease. Cooked roots have a slightly bitter sweet-potato flavour. Northwest Coast peoples also washed them or mashed them into cakes and dried them for winter.
