= Marshall-Stevenson Wildlife Sanctuary =

Wetlands area in Canada

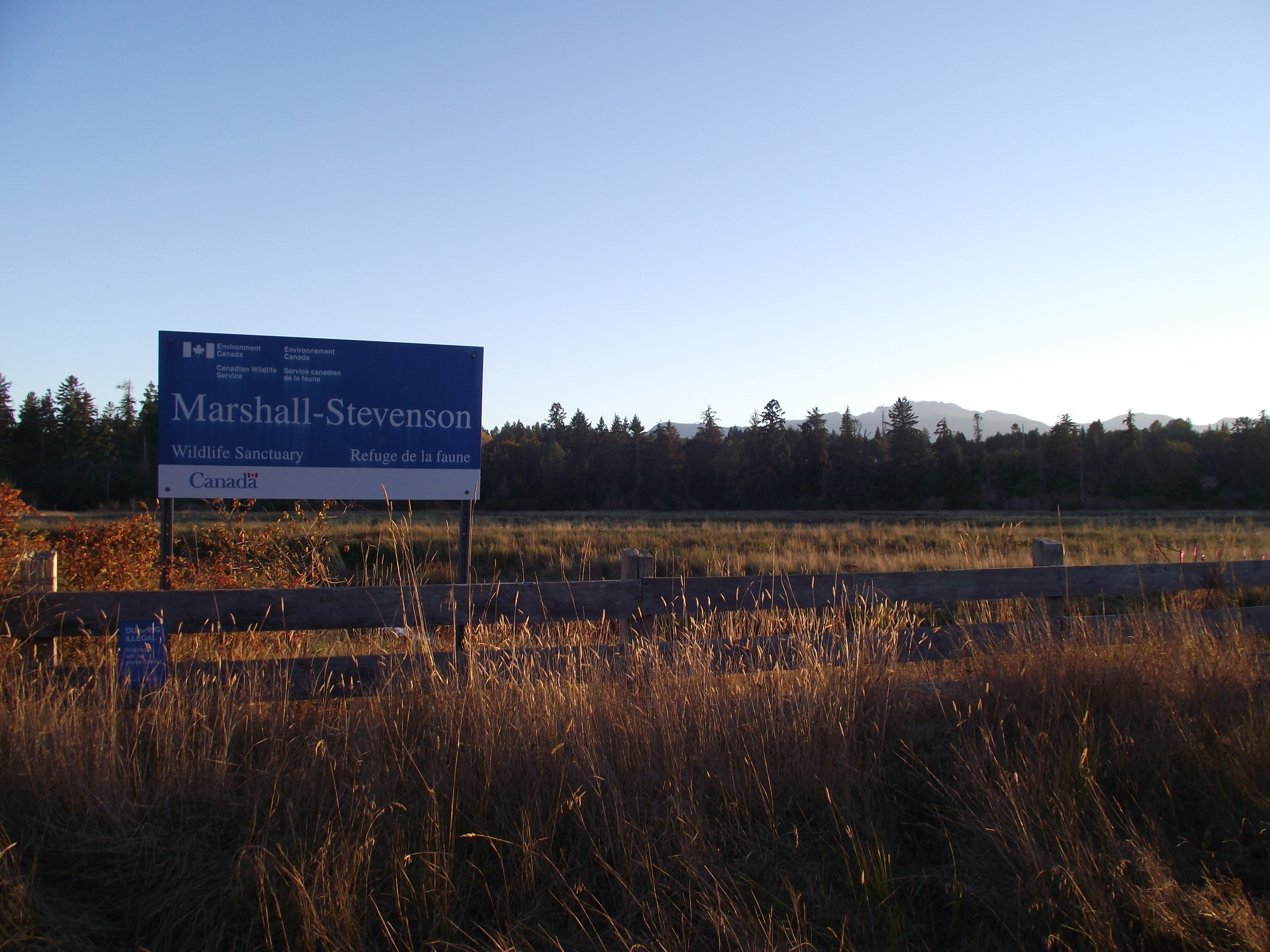

The Marshall-Stevenson Wildlife Sanctuary is a limited-access wetlands area located on Vancouver Island west of Qualicum Beach, British Columbia, Canada.

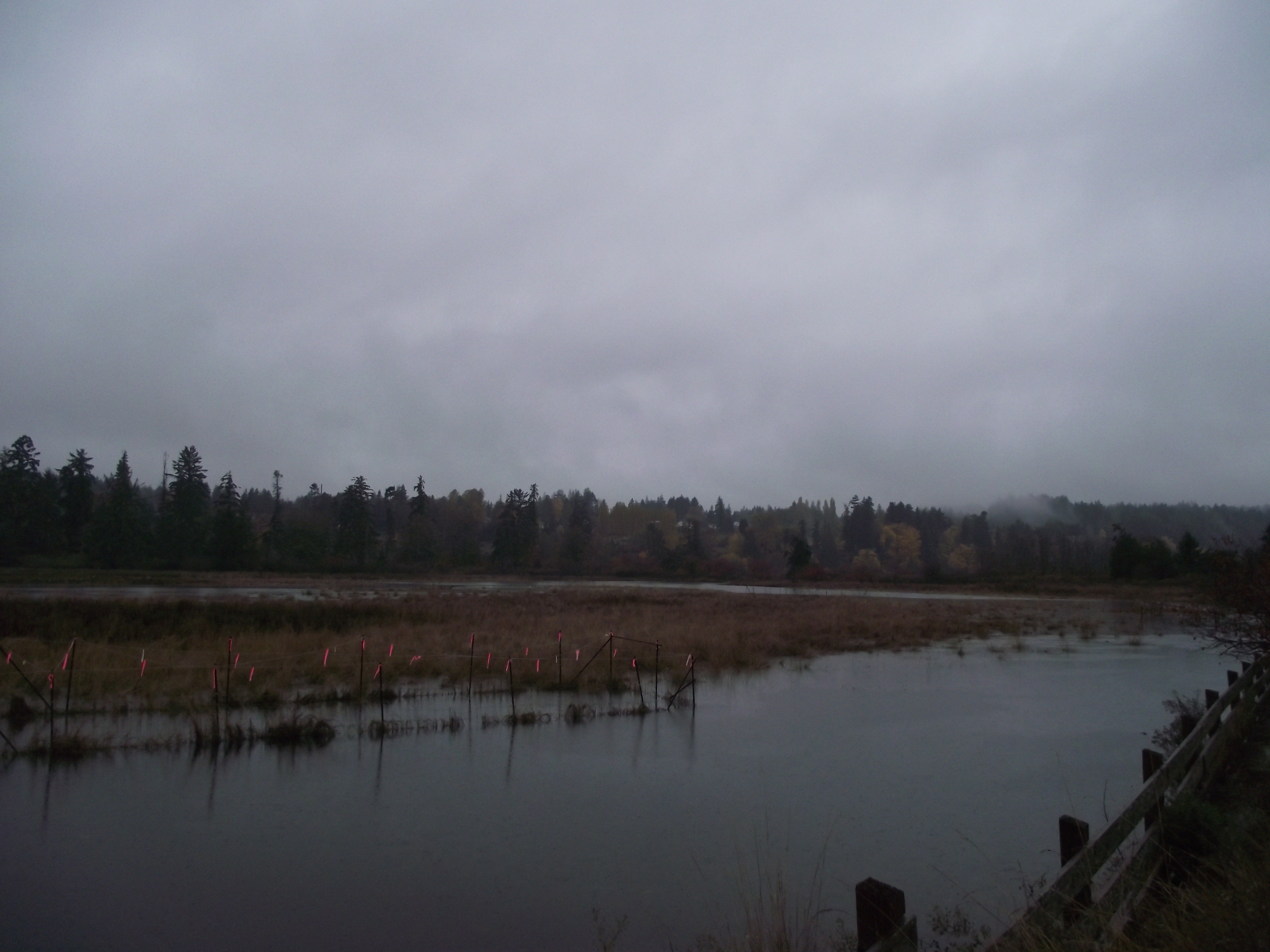
Marshall-Stevenson Wildlife Sanctuary, west, viewed at high tide in early fall

== History ==
The area was originally part of the Kinkade Farmstead (now a Federal Heritage site). Farmed in the late 19th century by settler Thomas Kinkade, the area was donated to the Federal Government in 1974 by Maureen and Sherwood Marshall and is now part of the Qualicum National Wildlife Area under supervision of Environment Canada. The sanctuary is named in honor of their respective families.

The sanctuary is adjacent to the Little Qualicum River Estuary Regional Conservation Area, 4.5 hectares of beach and estuary habitat at the mouth of the Little Qualicum River.

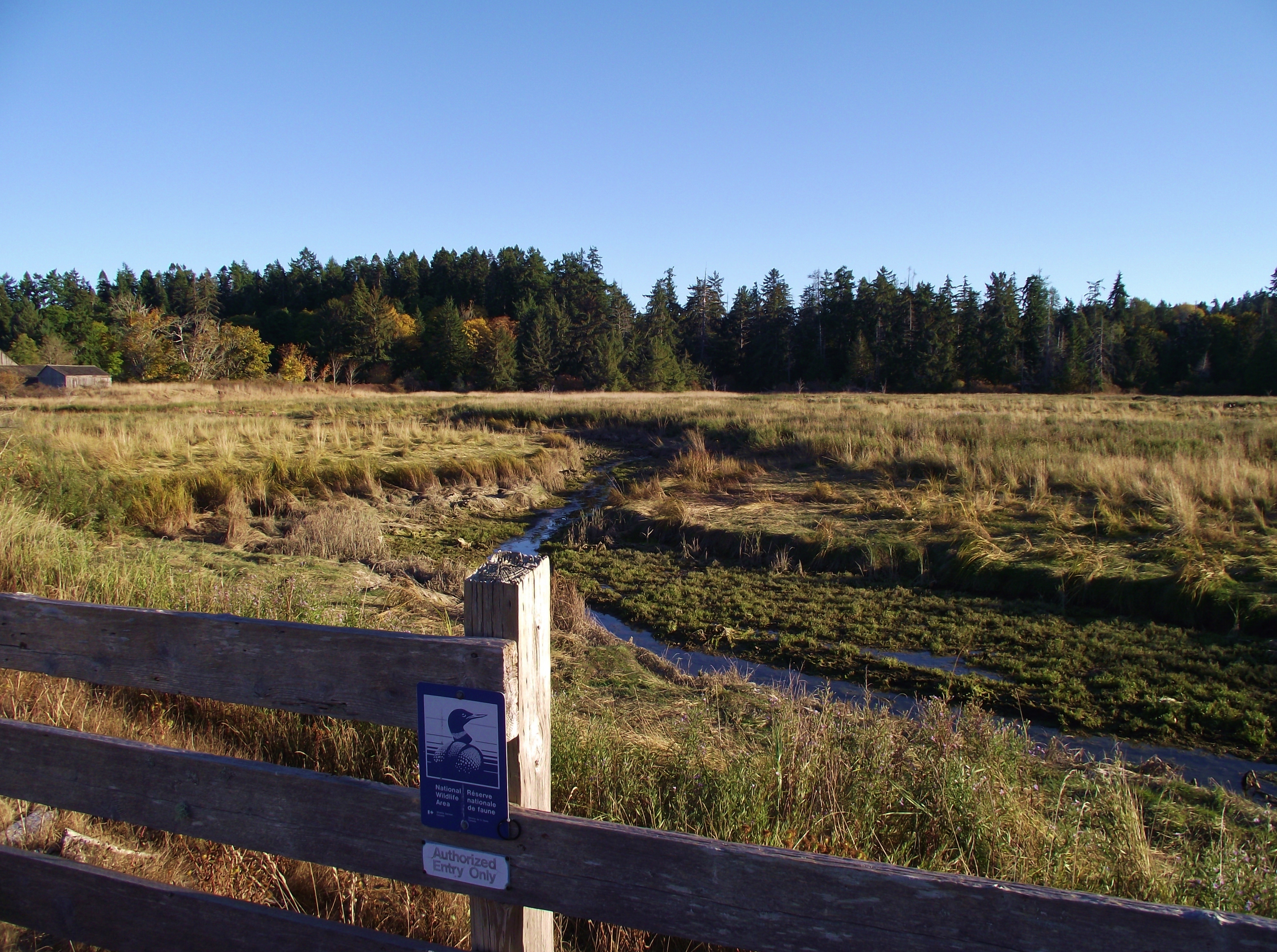
Easterly view, Kinkade Farmstead structures visible

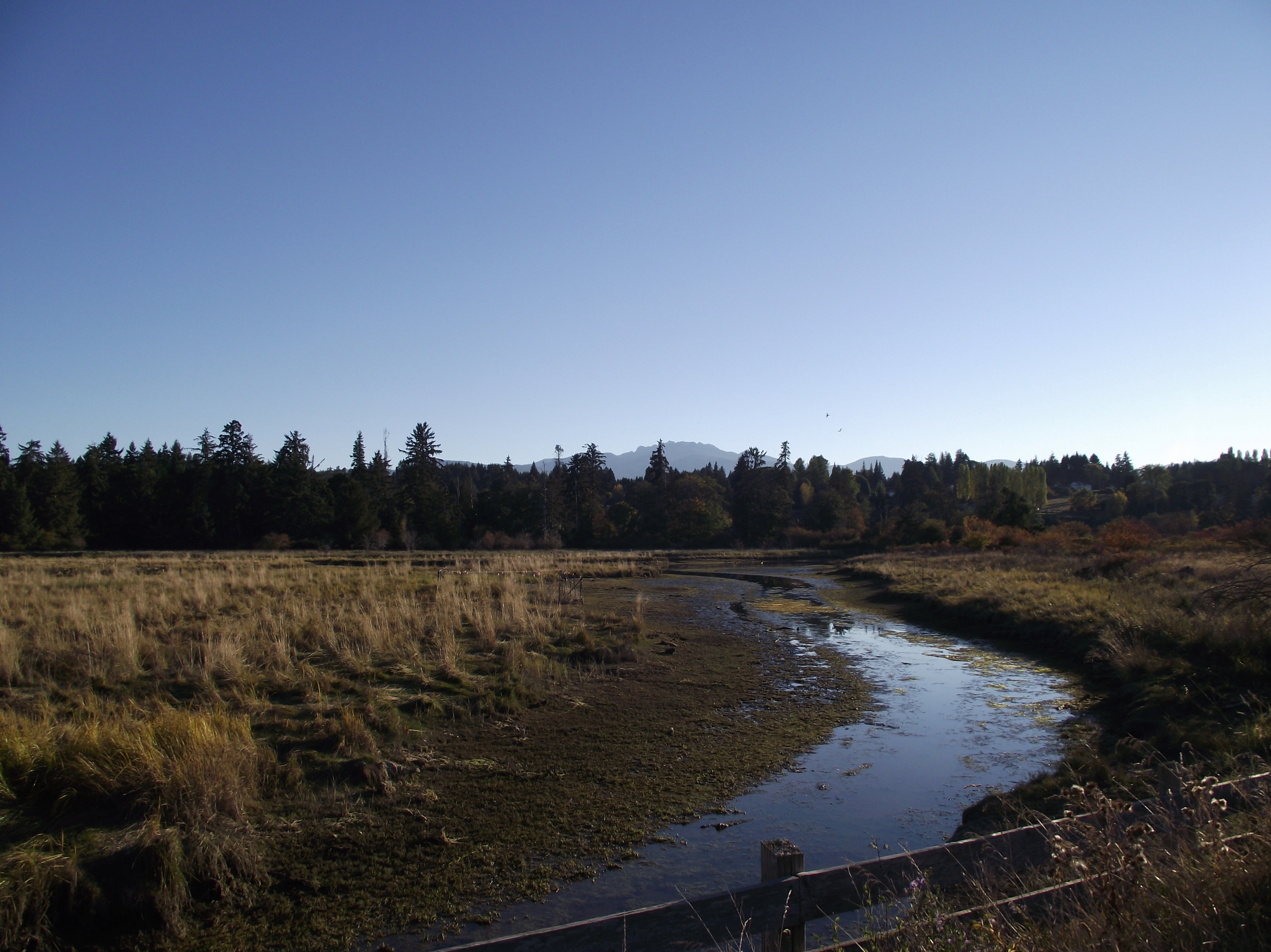
Westerly view

== Ecology ==
The wetland is a tidal marsh absorbing flow from both the outlet of the Little Qualicum River and the Strait of Georgia, supporting a complex ecosystem, including salmon spawning. Migratory waterfowl (including ducks, geese, and swans) rely on the area along with resident habitat users (including eagles, owls, egrets, deer, and otters). Because of the outflow of the river, pinnipeds are attracted to the area in the Strait of Georgia during spawning seasons.

There are concerns about the health of the marsh habitats. Non-migrant Canada Geese overgraze, changing fresh and sea water levels and channel movement affect the tidal replenishment necessary to the marsh’s health.

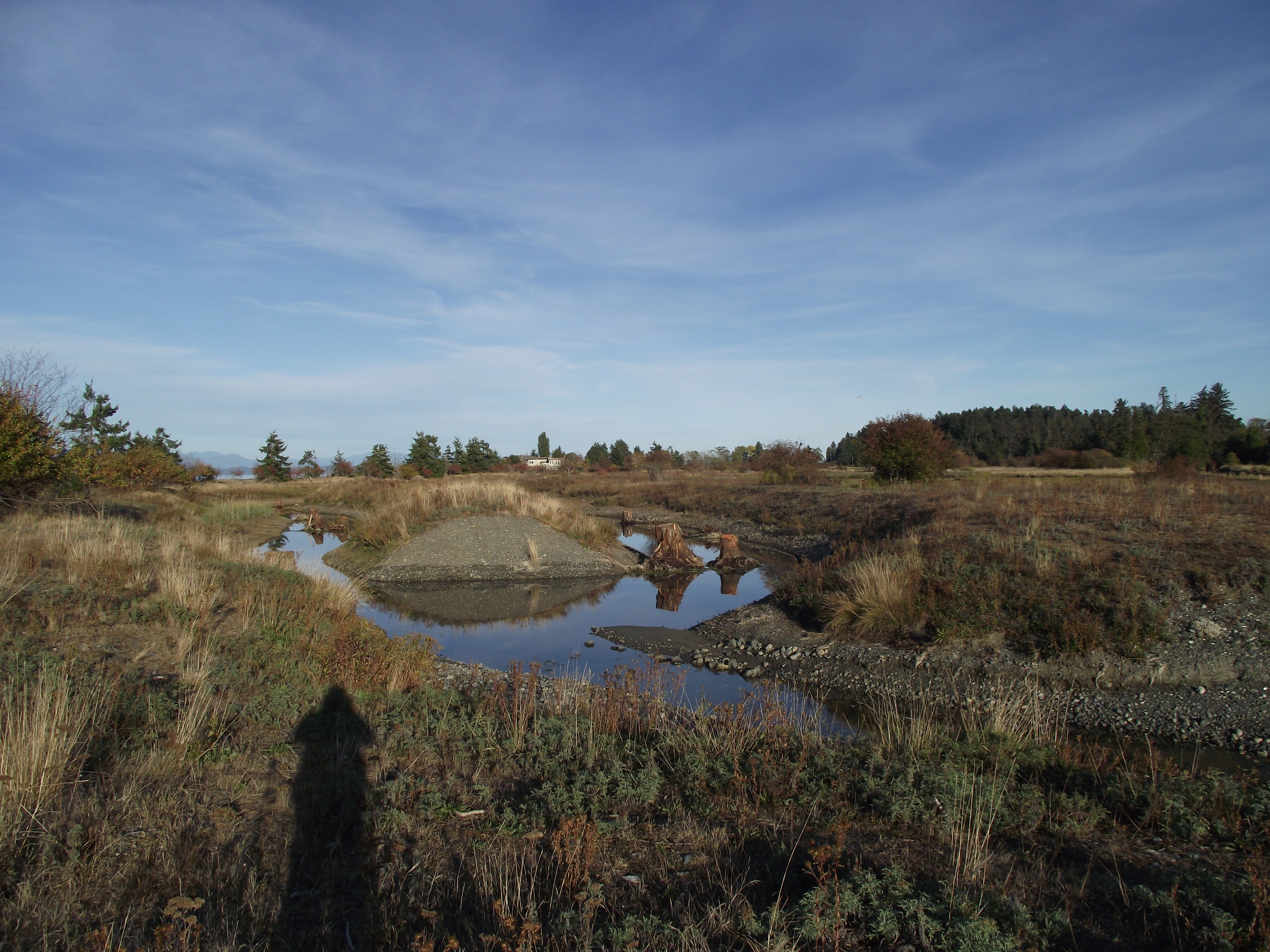
Man-made diversions created to control flow and erosion

== Access ==
There are no public trails into the sanctuary, though there are adequate viewing areas at the periphery of the property. Mount Cokely and Mount Arrowsmith are visible from the sanctuary.

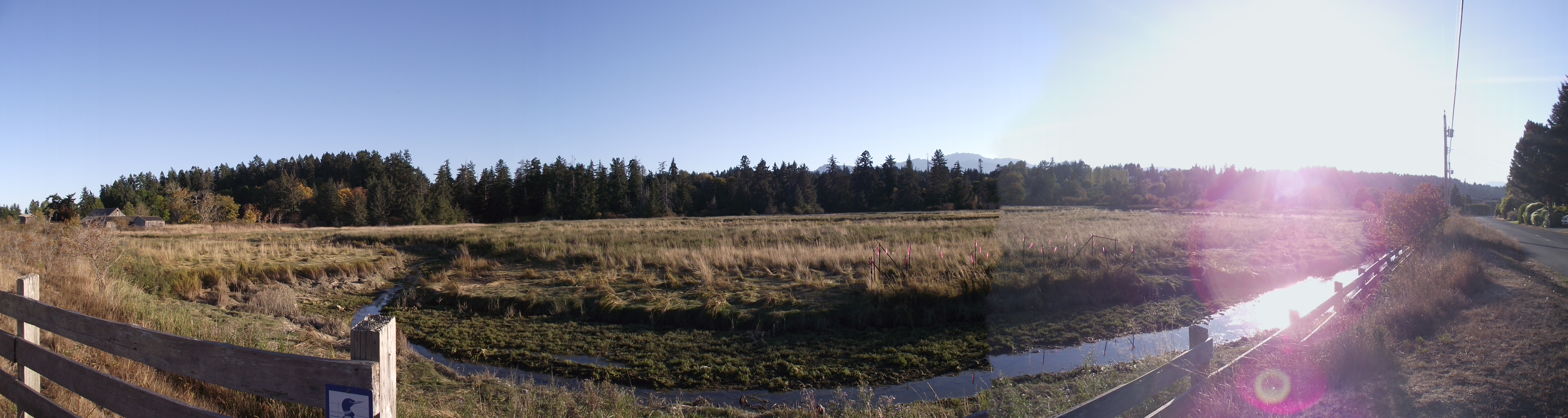
