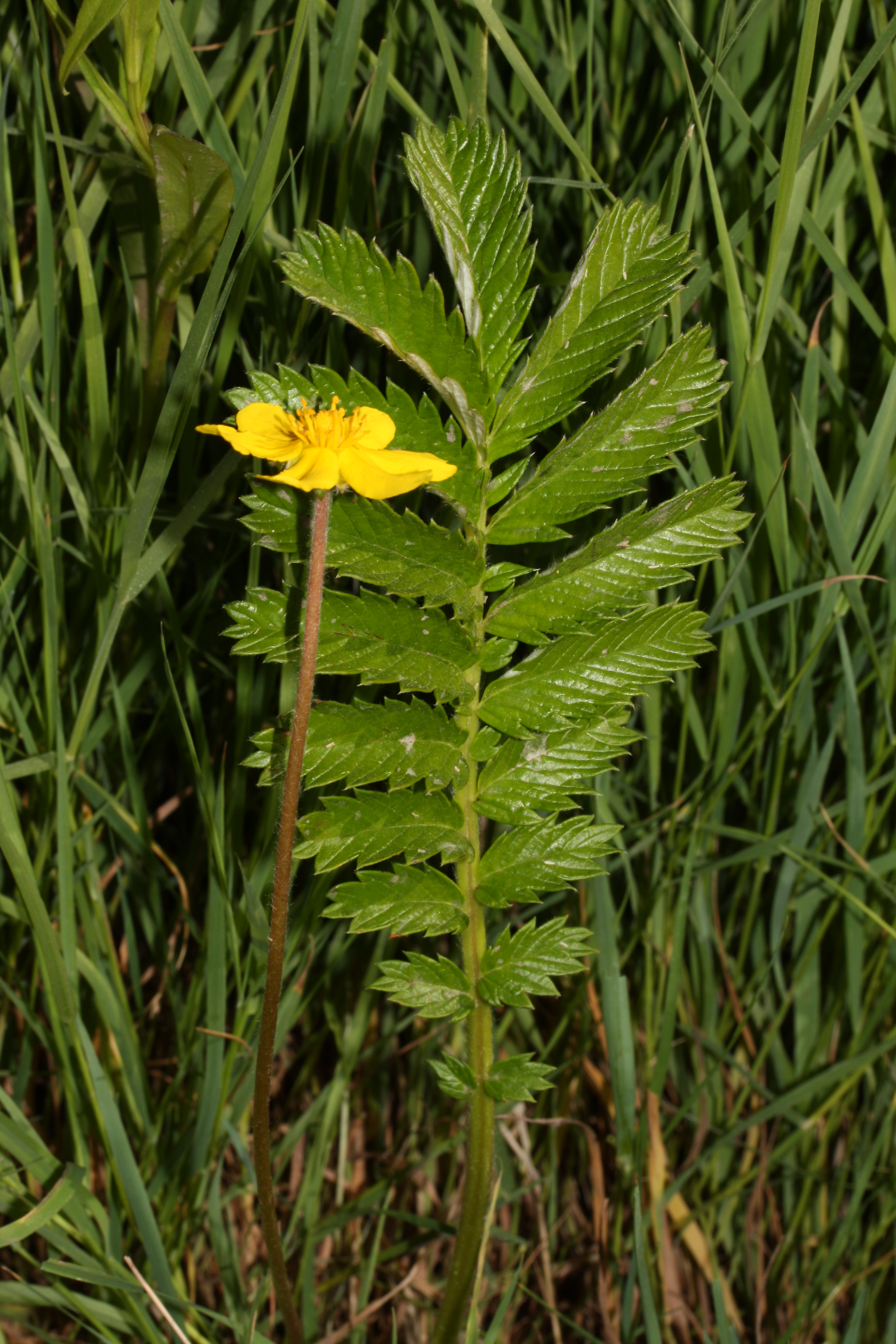

Scientific classification
- Kingdom: Plantae
- Clade: Tracheophytes
- Clade: Angiosperms
- Clade: Eudicots
- Clade: Rosids
- Order: Rosales
- Family: Rosaceae
- Genus: Argentina
- Species: A. anserina

Binomial name
- Argentina anserina (L.) Rydb.

Synonyms
- Potentilla anserina; Potentilla yukonensis

= Argentina anserina =

Species of flowering plant in the rose family

Argentina anserina (synonym Potentilla anserina) is a perennial flowering plant in the rose family, Rosaceae. It is known by the common names silverweed, common silverweed or silver cinquefoil. It is native throughout the temperate Northern Hemisphere, often on river shores and in grassy habitats such as meadows and road-sides.

== Description ==
Silverweed is a perennial low-growing herbaceous plant growing up to 20 centimetres (8 in) tall. It has creeping red stolons that can be up to 80 cm (31 in) long. The leaves are 10–20 cm (4–8 in) long, evenly pinnate into in saw-toothed leaflets 2–5 cm long and 1–2 cm broad with 6–14 teeth per side, covered with silky white hairs, particularly on the underside. These hairs are also present on the stem and the stolons. These give the leaves the silvery appearance from which the plant gets its name. Each leaf is borne on a channeled petiole up to 5 cm in length with a long sheathing base.

Close-up of leaf with hairs visible

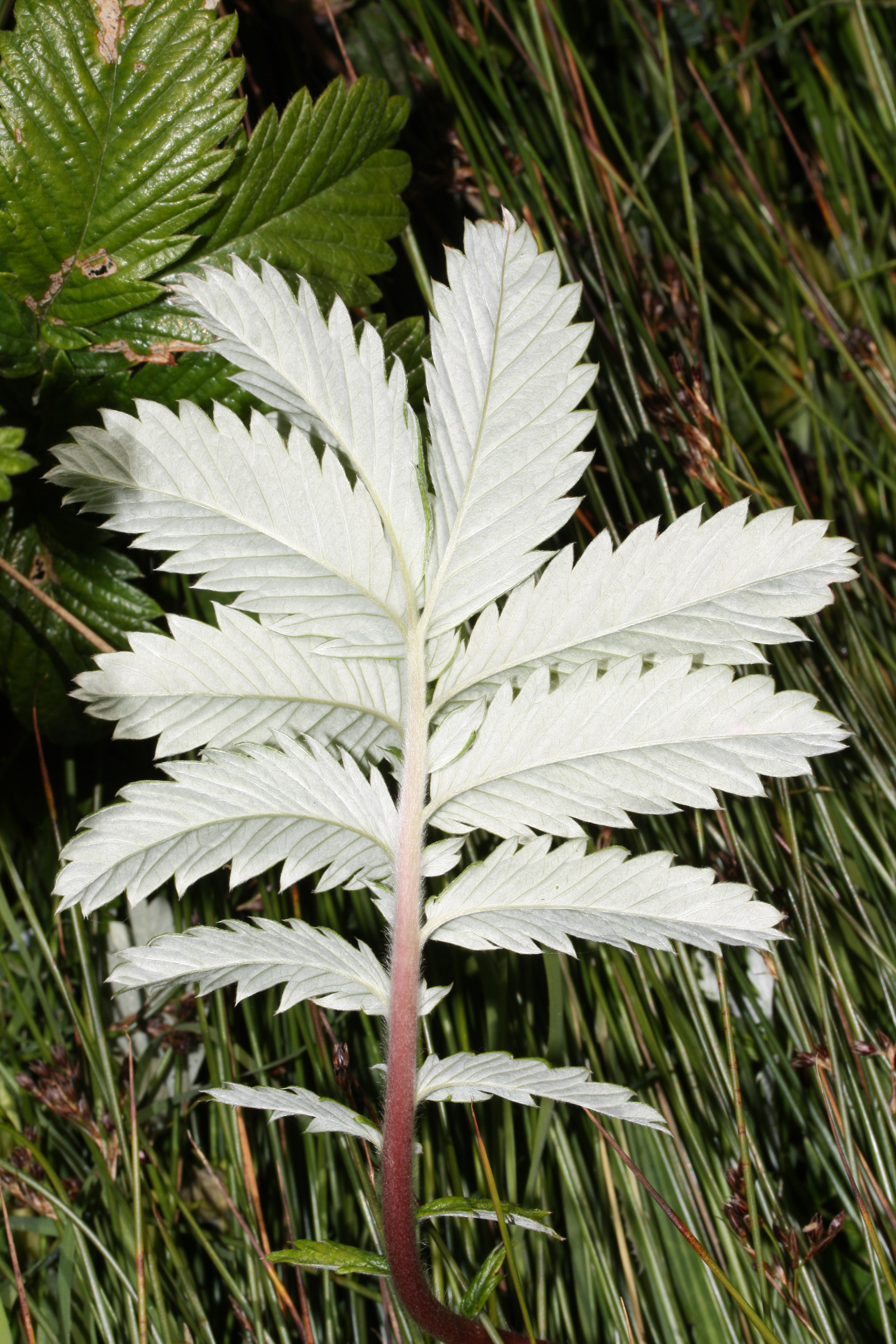
Underside of ssp. pacifica leaf

The flowers are produced singly on 5–15 cm long stems, 1.5–2.5 cm diameter with five (rarely up to seven) yellow petals. The fruit is a cluster of dry achenes.

== Taxonomy ==
The plant was originally placed in the genus Potentilla by Carl Linnaeus in his Species Plantarum (1753), but was reclassified into the resurrected genus Argentina by research conducted in the 1990s. The reclassification remains controversial and is not accepted by some authorities. It is a species aggregate which has frequently been divided into multiple species.

== Distribution and habitat ==
Silverweed is native throughout the temperate Northern Hemisphere.

It is most often found in sandy or gravelly soils, where it may spread rapidly by its prolific rooting stolons. It typically occurs in inland habitats, unlike A. egedii, which is a salt-tolerant coastal salt marsh plant.

== Uses ==
The plant was put in shoes to absorb sweat. It was formerly believed to be useful for epilepsy, and that it could ward off witches and evil spirits.

The plant's roots were eaten by some Native American tribes, and were ground and mixed with oat or barley meal to make bannocks in Scotland It has been cultivated as a food crop for its edible roots, which resemble parsnips. It may also become a problem weed in gardens.

Travelers visiting Tibet reported on the food use of the plant's root in the region. According to Pyotr Kozlov, who traveled in the Kham region in 1900–1901, Tibetans, who did not have any vegetables other than turnips, would often dig out roots of Argentina anserina (whose local name he gave as djüma), which could be easily dried and stored for later use. Kozlov even suggested that it would not be a bad idea for Russian peasants to do likewise, especially in famine years. The mission of Sarat Chandra Das to Tibet in the late 19th century reported that the root of the plant, under a Tibetan name variously transcribed as toma, doma or droma, was served cooked in butter and sugar at the New Year's celebrations in the Tibetan capital Lhasa.

== In culture ==
The pre-Linnaean name anserina means "of the goose" (Anser), either because the plant was used to feed them or because the leaves resembled the bird's footprints. In Sweden, the flower is called gåsört (goose-wort).

A rich folklore has developed around Silverweed. The plant bears the common name of richette in French, being rich through both silver and gold.

There is a legend that the Christ Child grew up and walked the roads of Judea, and the yellow flowering plant of the dusty wayside with silvery fern-like leaves that lay flat on the ground has been called the Footsteps of Our Lord.

== Fossil record ==
Argentina anserina achenes are rather rare in Pliocene fossil floras of the East Europe but common in the Pleistocene.
