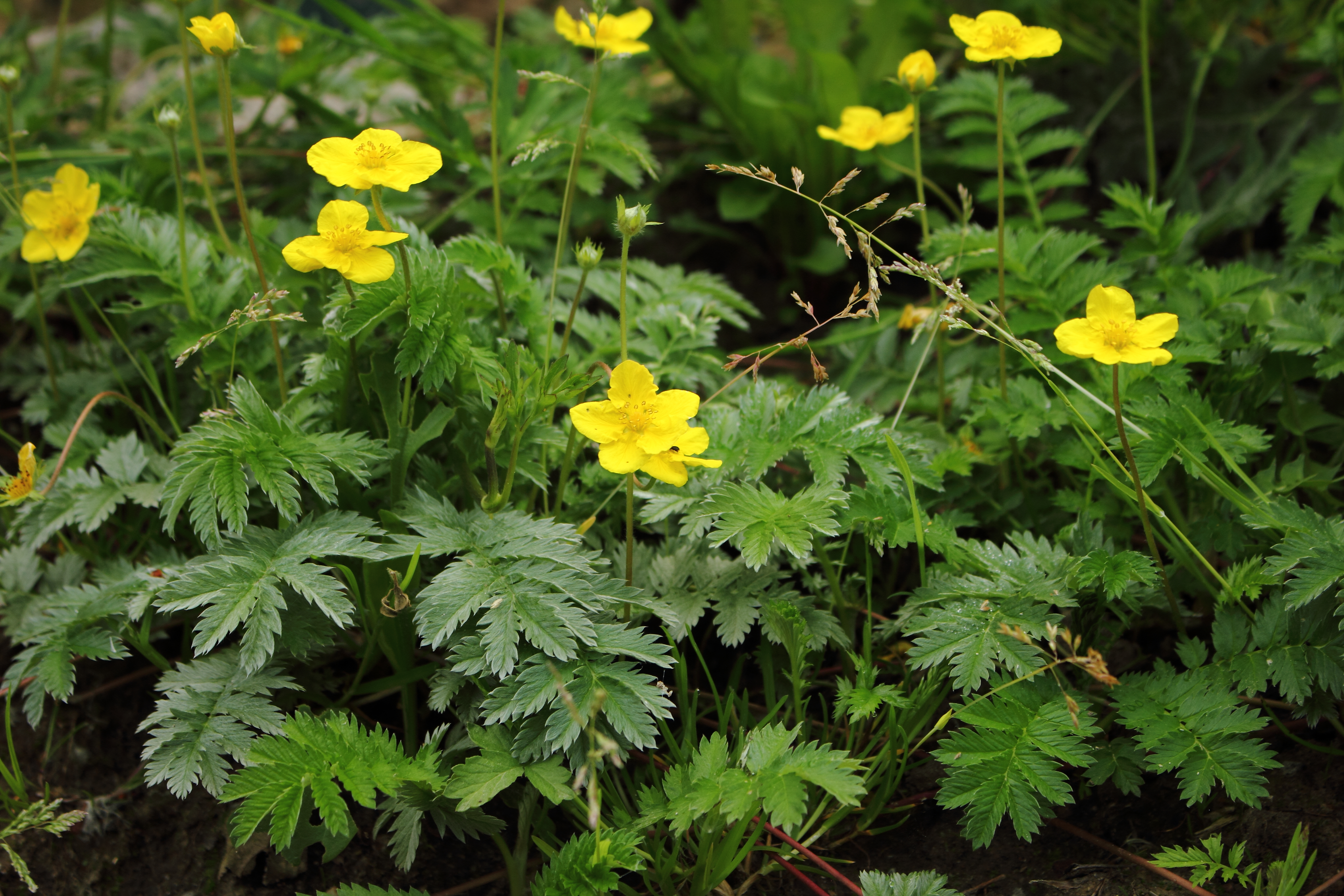
- Argentina anserina

Scientific classification
- Kingdom: Plantae
- Clade: Embryophytes
- Clade: Tracheophytes
- Clade: Spermatophytes
- Clade: Angiosperms
- Clade: Eudicots
- Clade: Rosids
- Order: Rosales
- Family: Rosaceae
- Subfamily: Rosoideae
- Tribe: Potentilleae
- Subtribe: Potentillinae
- Genus: Argentina; Hill

Species
- See text

Synonyms
- Piletophyllum (Soják) Soják

= Argentina (plant) =

Genus of flowering plants

Argentina (silverweeds) is a genus of plants in the rose family (Rosaceae) which is accepted by some authors, as containing 71 species, but classified in Potentilla sect. Leptostylae by others.

The genus is native throughout most of the temperate Northern Hemisphere, and also in subtropical and tropical southern Asia to New Guinea, and with an outlying species in New Zealand.

== Selected species ==
- Argentina anserina – Common silverweed (syn. Potentilla anserina, Argentina egedii)
- Argentina anserinoides – New Zealand silverweed (syn. Potentilla anserinoides)
- Argentina pacifica – Pacific silverweed
