= Potentilla glandulosa =

Potentilla glandulosa may refer to seven different species of plants:

- Potentilla glandulosa Hook. & Arn., an unplaced name that cannot be accepted, nor put into synonymy
- Potentilla glandulosa Boulay, an unplaced name that cannot be accepted, nor put into synonymy
- Potentilla glandulosa S.Watson, an unplaced name that cannot be accepted, nor put into synonymy
- Potentilla glandulosa Holz., an unplaced name that cannot be accepted, nor put into synonymy
- Potentilla glandulosa Krašan, a taxonomic synonym for spring cinquefoil (Potentilla pusilla)
- Potentilla glandulosa Th.Wolf, a taxonomic synonym for dwarf cinquefoil (Potentilla brauneana)
- Potentilla glandulosa Lindl., a taxonomic synonym for sticky cinquefoil (Drymocallis glandulosa)
