= Yxnås nature reserve =

Protected area in Sweden

- Yxnås naturreservat
- IUCN category IV (habitat/species management area)
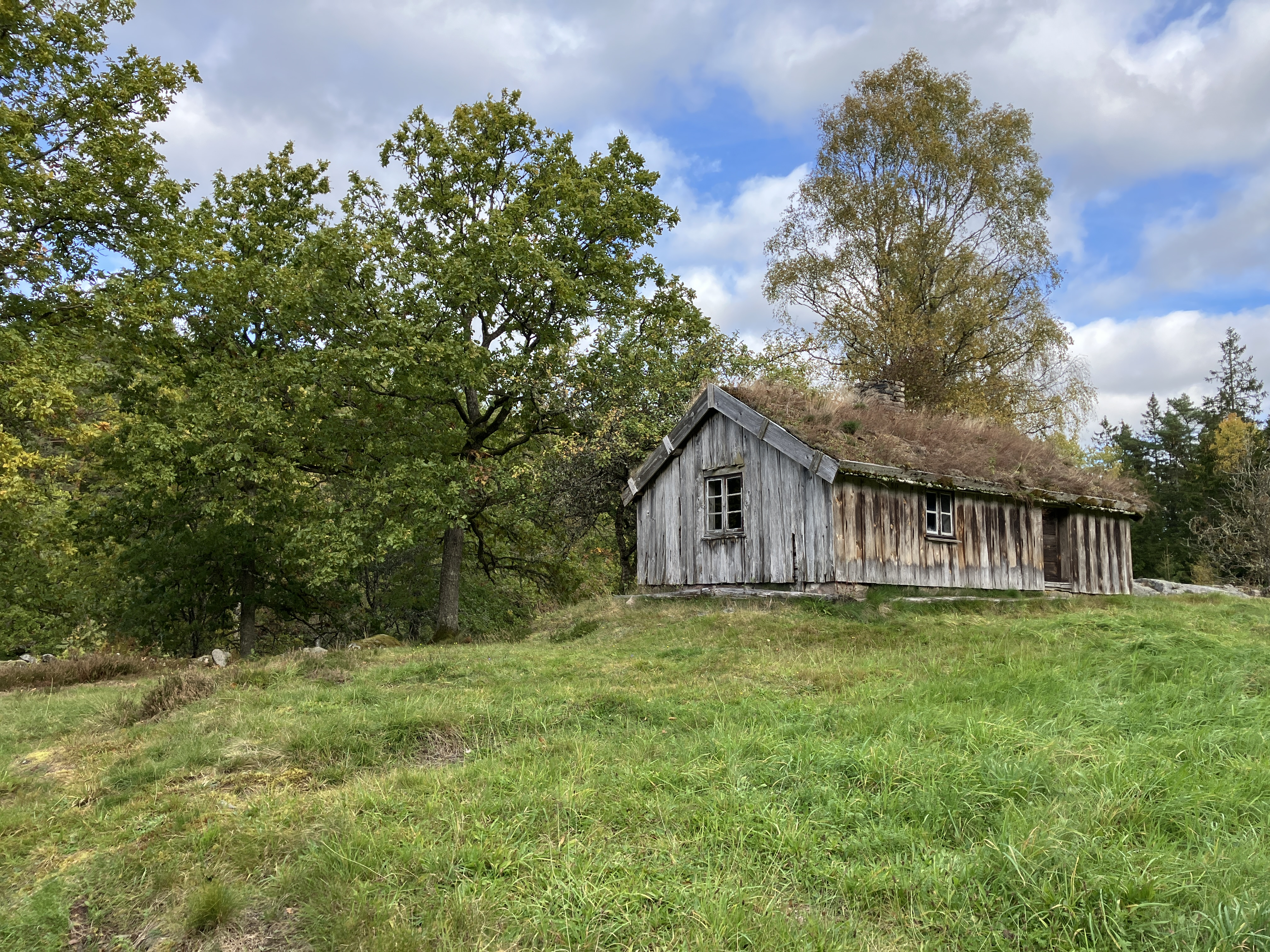
- A soldier's torp (i.e., cottage) from the 17th century relocated to the preserve in the 1980s.
- Location of the Yxnås nature reserve
- Location: Sweden
- Nearest city: Alingsås
- Coordinates: 57°56′54.6″N 12°41′54.54″E
- Area: 16.4 hectares (41 acres)
- Established: 1980-04-21
- Governing body: Västkuststiftelsen
- Website: www.lansstyrelsen.se/vastra-gotaland/besoksmal/naturreservat/yxnas.html

Yxnås Nature Reserve (Swedish: Yxnås naturreservat) is a natural preserve between Alingsås and Vårgårda in West Sweden. It has national significance and is protected as a part of Natura 2000; its national interest is derived from its unique agricultural landscape and cultural heritage. The preserve characterizes the life of the 19th century for tenant farmers or torpare, as they are called in Swedish.

The nature reserve polygonally covers 16.4 hectares (41 acres). It was established on April 21, 1980, and is administrated by Västkuststiftelsen, a Swedish foundation dedicated to the management of nature reserves. Within its borders are Fennoscandian species-rich grasslands, hay meadows, and a wet meadow. On the grounds, there are multiple buildings, including a soldier's torp from the 17th century that was relocated to the reserve in the '80s which is open and accessible.

The reserve is located along stage 11 of the Gotaleden hiking trail, a path that leads from Gothenburg to Vårgårda.

== Plants and animals ==
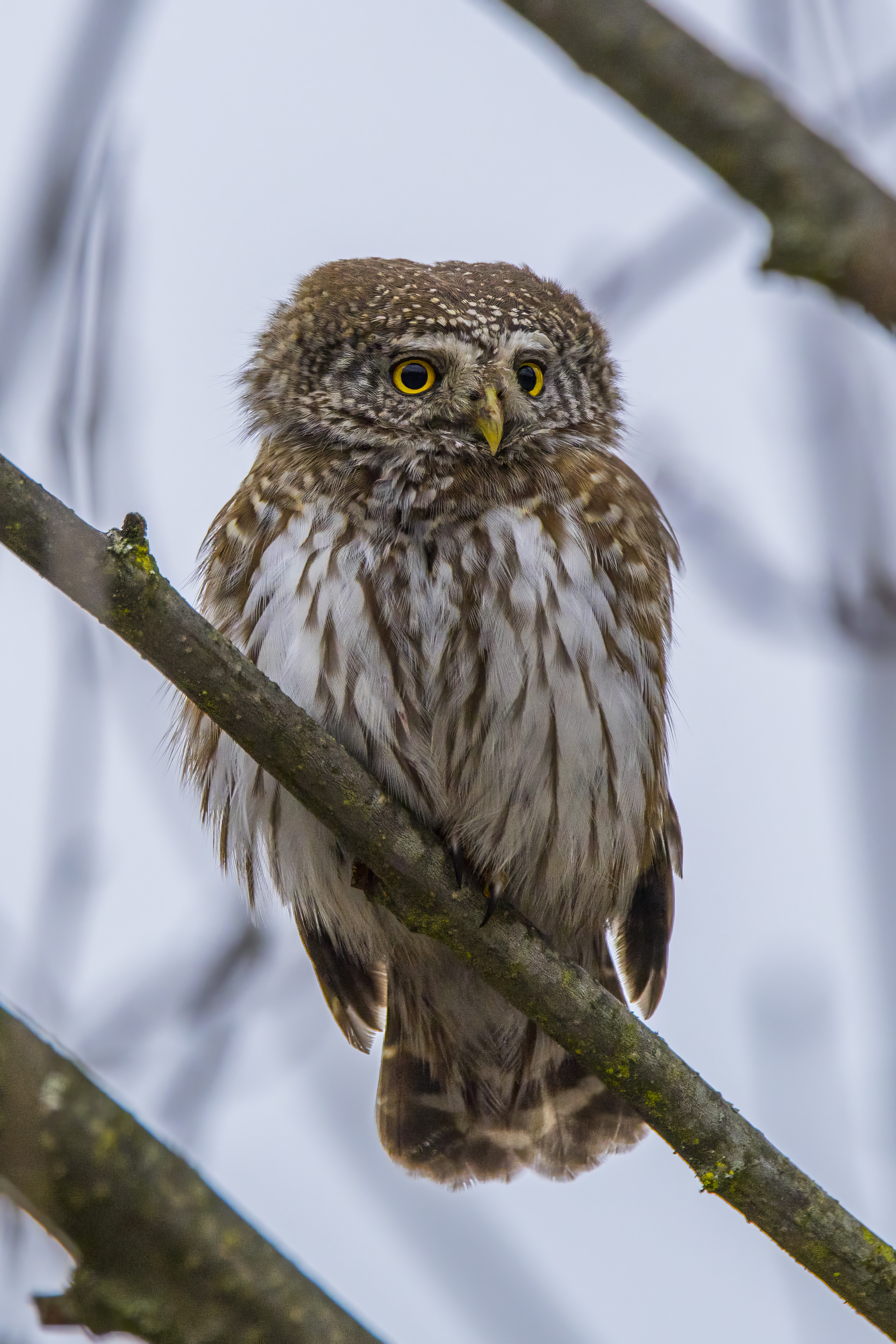
Eurasian pygmy owl (Sparvuggla)

There are various kinds of plants and animals located in the reserve, including the following: (Note: The names in parentheses are the Swedish equivalents.)

- Actaea spicata (Trolldruva)
- Agrostemma githago (Klätt)
- Arnica montana (Slåttergubbe)
- Campanula persicifolia (Stor blåklocka)
- Cuscuta epilinum (Linsnärja)
- Drymocallis rupestris (Trollsmultron)
- Eurasian pygmy owl (Sparvuggla)
- Hepatica (Blåsippssläktet)
- Hygrocybe aurantiosplendens (Fager vaxskiviling)
- Pinguicula vulgaris (Tätört)
- Rhinanthus angustifolius (Åkerskallra)
- Silver-washed fritillary (Silverstreckad pärlemorfjäril)
- Viviparous lizard (Skogsödla)

One of the primary reasons for designating the area as a Natura 2000 site was to preserve the habit of these and other wild plants and animals.

== Gallery ==
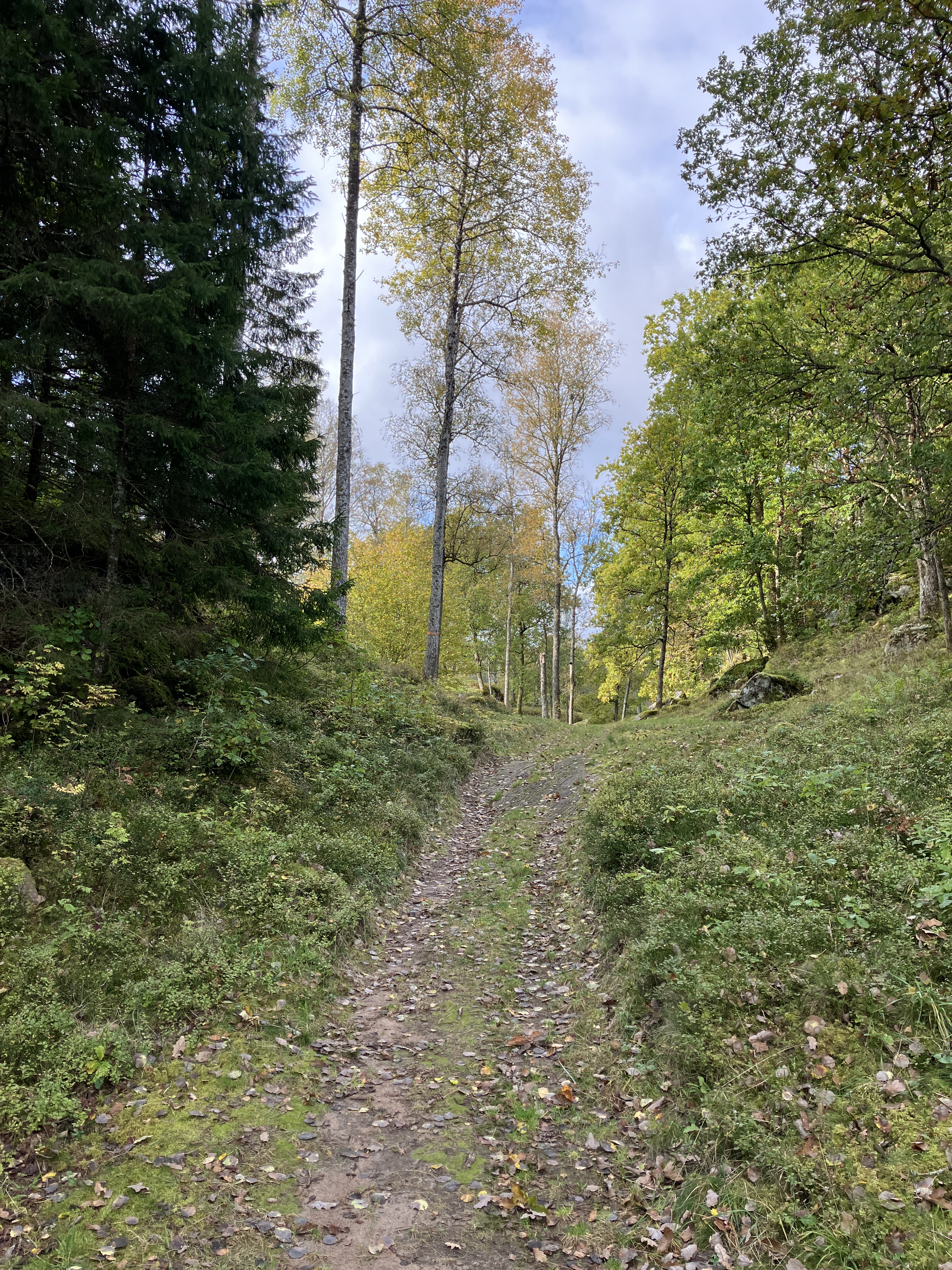
The Gotaleden trail through the reserve

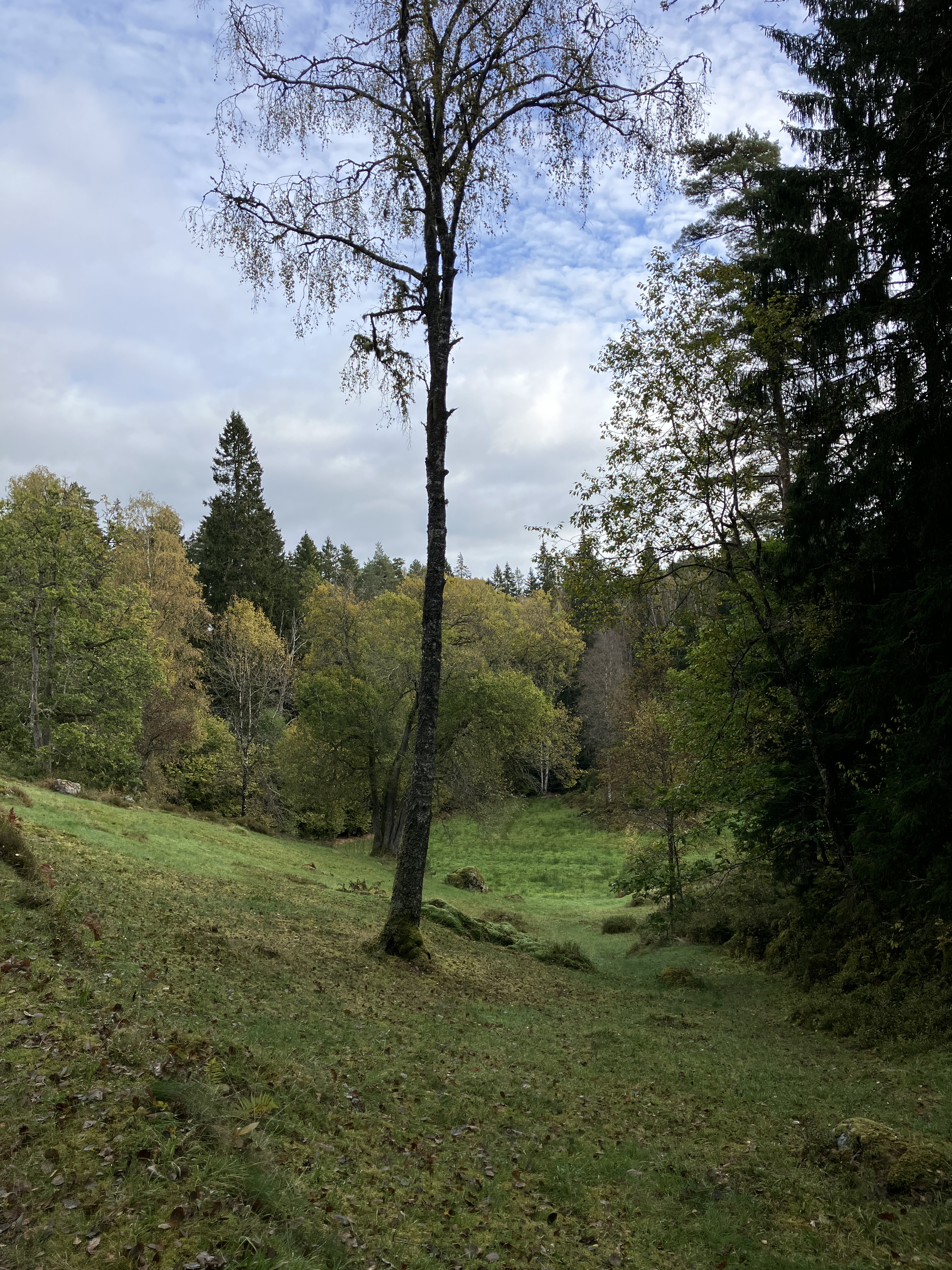
A meadow along Gotaleden

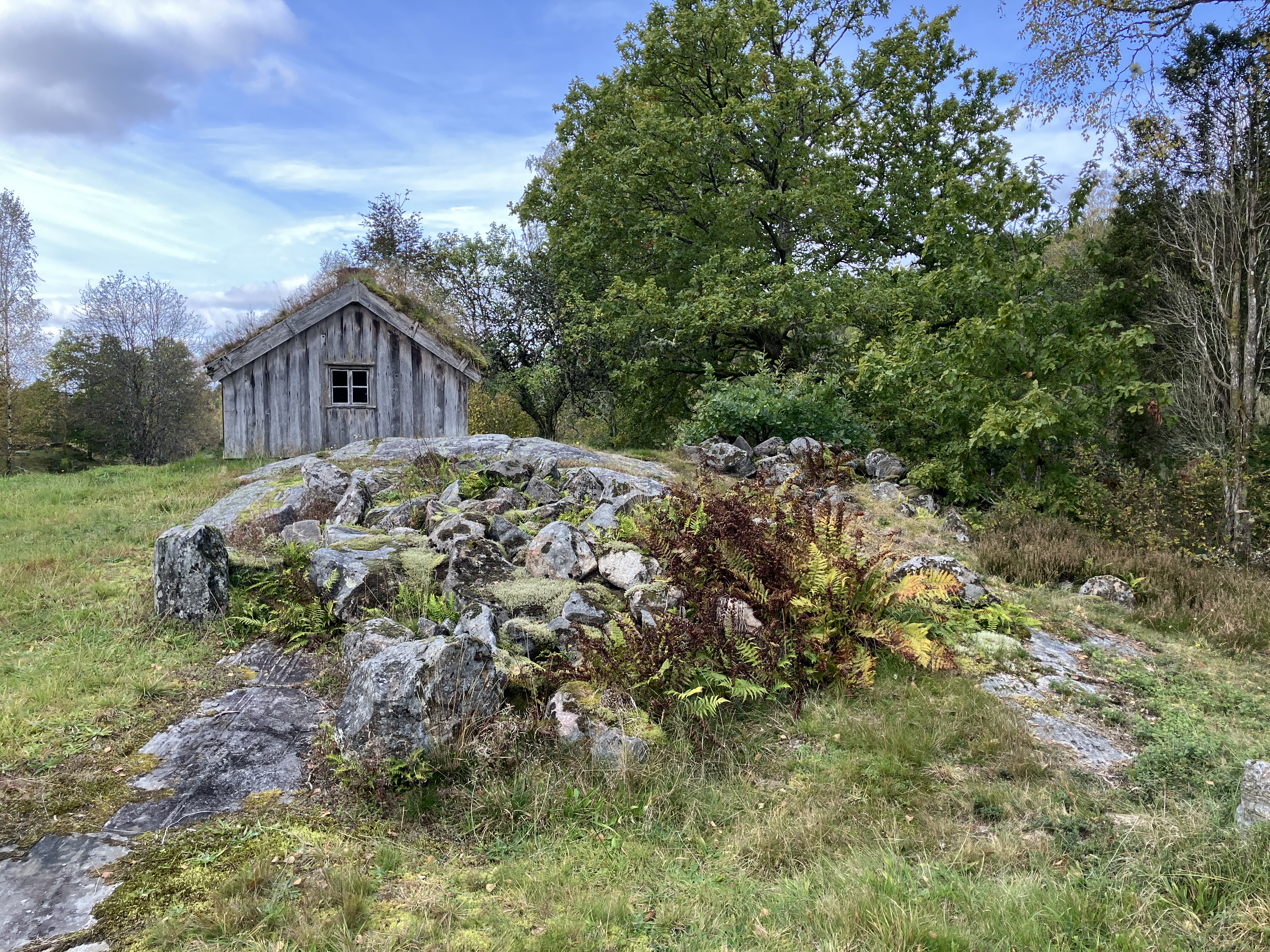
Soldier's cottage

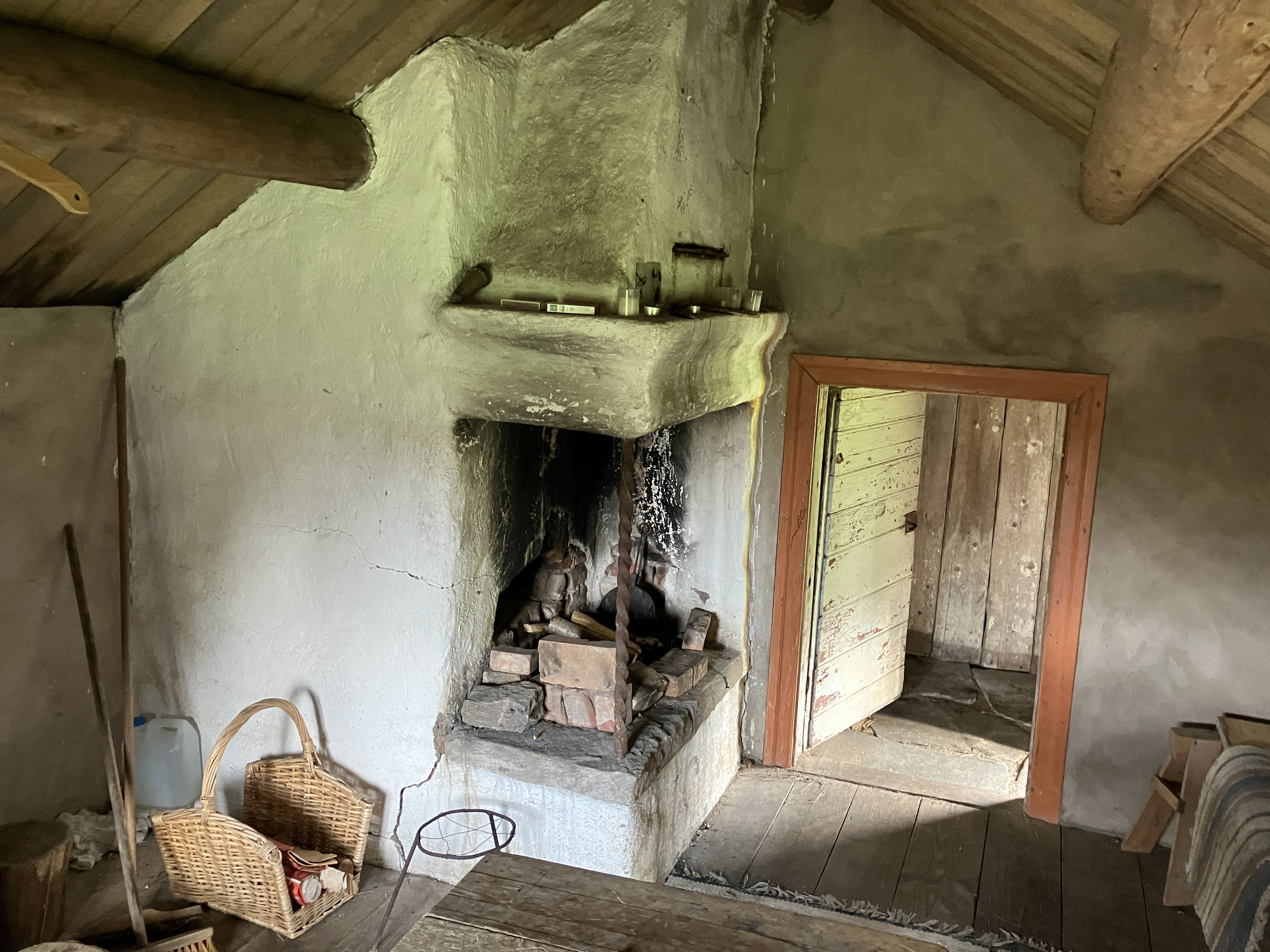
Inside of soldier's cottage

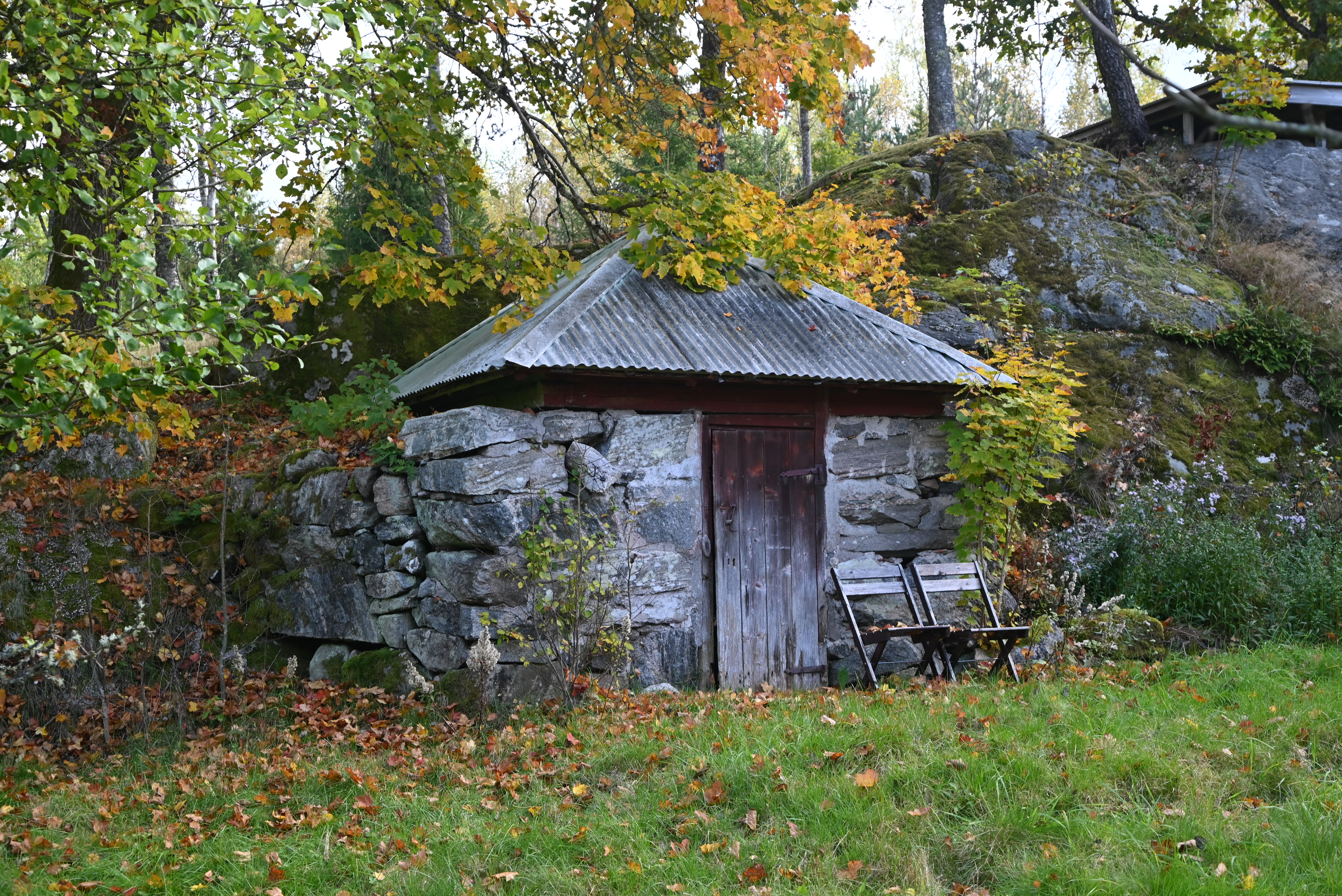
Structure on the northeast side of the reserve

== Prohibited activities ==
Certain activities are not allowed in the reserve, including littering, picking plants, breaking branches off of or in any way damaging trees or bushes, camping, starting fires, horseback riding in the meadows or fields, and driving motorized vehicles (e.g., all-terrain vehicle).

== Parking ==
There is parking located on road O 1779 off Kärtaredsvägen to the southeast of the reserve. A trail leads to the west into the grounds.

== Popular culture ==
Parts of the 2021 production of The Emigrants were filmed in the reserve.
