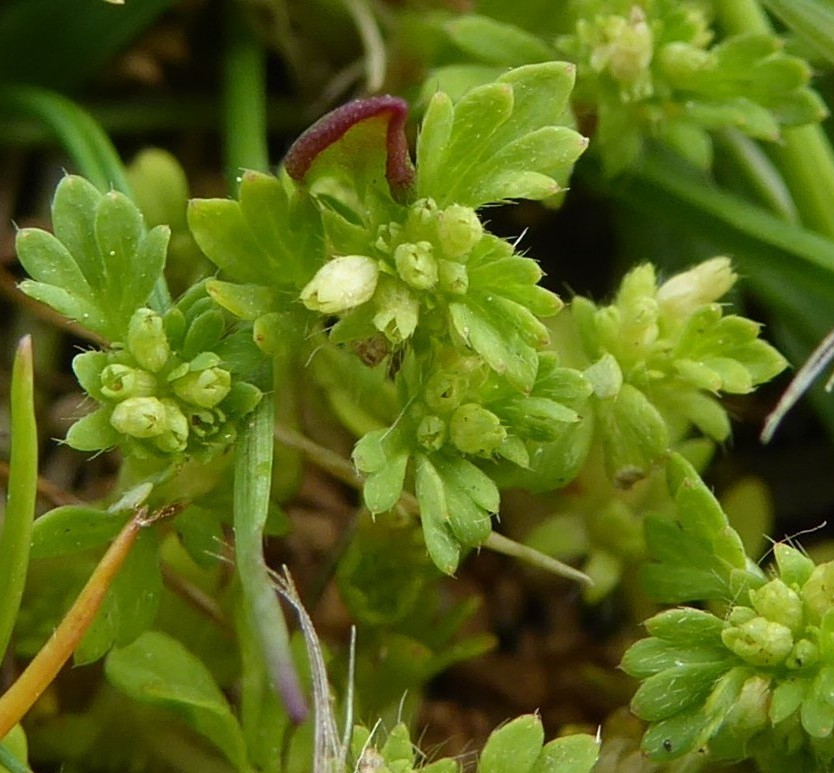

Scientific classification
- Kingdom: Plantae
- Clade: Tracheophytes
- Clade: Angiosperms
- Clade: Eudicots
- Clade: Rosids
- Order: Rosales
- Family: Rosaceae
- Genus: Aphanes
- Species: A. australis

Binomial name
- Aphanes australis Rydb.

Synonyms
- List: Aphanes inexspectata W. Lippert; Potentilla inexspectata (W. Lippert) Christenh. & Väre; Alchemilla microcarpa auct.; Alchemilla australis (Rydb.) Bomble

= Aphanes australis =

Species of flowering plant

Aphanes australis (syn. Alchemilla australis), slender parsley-piert, is a sprawling, downy plant that is found in acid grassland and on bare ground throughout western Europe and which has spread to other parts of the world with agriculture.

== Description ==
Slender parsley-piert is a pale green winter annual herb with prostrate, branched, leafy stems up to 15 cm long. The leaves are alternate and spiral around the stem, with a short petiole and large, deeply-lobed stipules at the base. They are about 0.5 cm long, broadly ternate with deeply lobed leaflets, and sparsely hairy. An important identification feature is the leaf base, which is usually cuneate, narrowing gradually into the stalk.

The inflorescences are glomerules of 4-10 flowers nestled within the stipules, opposite the base of each leaf. The flowers are up to 2 mm long, pale green, sparsely pubescent and have 4 sepals which never open fully. Petals are absent. Flowers are bisexual, usually with a single stamen and a single style which are almost entirely hidden by the sepals.

Each flower produces a single achene that is ovoid, glabrous and shining.

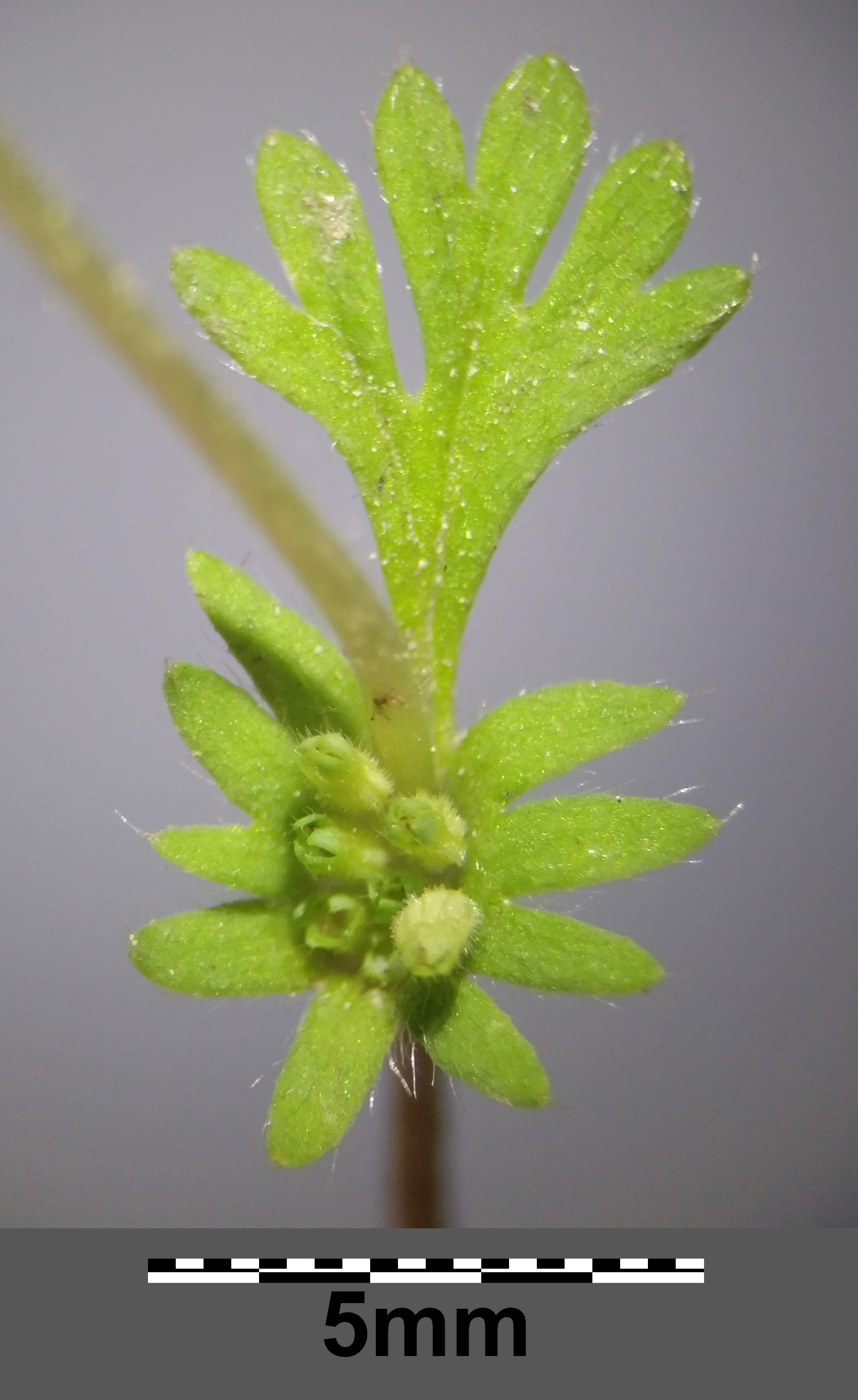
The flowers have erect sepals and the leaf base narrows gradually into the stalk.

== Identification ==
Slender parsley-piert can be very difficult to tell apart from common parsley-piert, although the former tends to be smaller, a brighter green, have cuneate rather than cordate leaf bases, and grows in acid grassland rather than arable fields and waste ground. Those useful field characters can be confirmed by the following observations:

- Slender parsley-piert has flowers that are 1-1.9 mm long, while those of common parsley-piert are 1.9-2.7 mm
- Slender has upright sepals, while common has them spreading
- Slender has smooth fruits, while common has them furrowed at the base
- Slender has deeply divided stipule teeth, while common has them divided less than half way
- Slender has 6-9 leaf lobes, while common has 7-15.

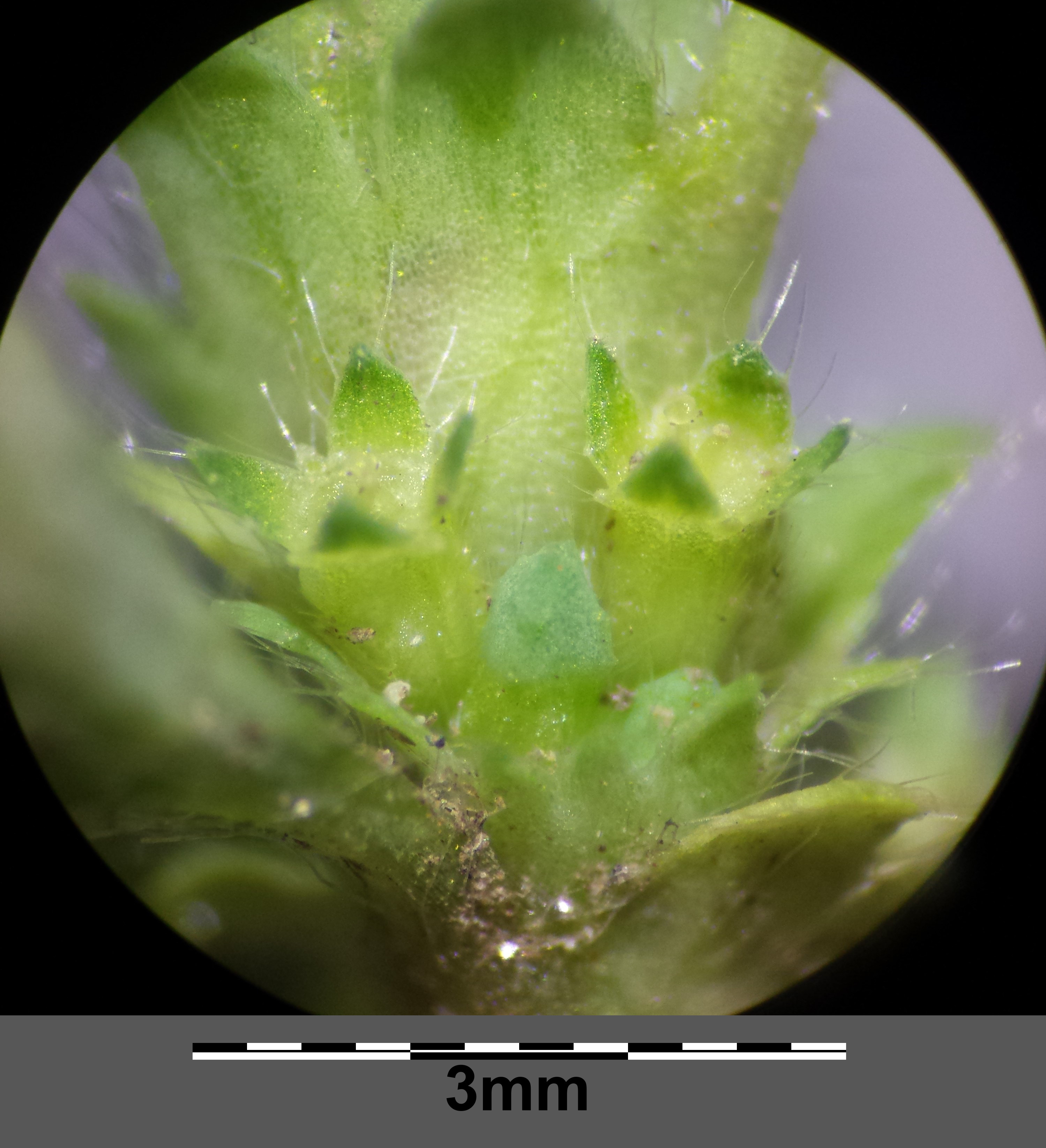
The flowers of common parsley-piert have spreading sepals, unlike those of slender parsley-piert.

== Taxonomy ==
The different species of parsley-piert have not always been adequately recognised. Carl Linnaeus, in Species Plantarum (1753) gave only one species, which he called Aphanes arvensis. This name would have been used for both Aphanes arvensis and A. australis until the latter was recognised as distinct. That happened in 1908, when a review of four North American species of parsley-piert was undertaken by Per Axel Rydberg of the New York Botanic Garden. He described it from a specimen that had been collected in Washington, D.C., and said it could be found from Virginia to Georgia. Meanwhile, it had also been described from Spain as early as 1842 and named Alchemilla microcarpa, but was overlooked elsewhere in Europe until the mid-20th century.

The close relationship between Aphanes and Alchemilla has long been known. Parsley-piert was even called Alchemilla montana minima before Linnaeus's time. Recent studies have shown that the genus Alchemilla is polyphyletic, so either Aphanes has to be included within that genus, or several new genera need to be named. At present, botanical authors differ in which approach they take. The differences between the parsley-pierts and the lady's-mantles are that the former are annuals while the latter are perennials, and the flowers have a different arrangement of stamens.

The origin of the common name parsley-piert is unknown, but several suggestions have been made. One is that it is derived from parsley, owing to the similarity in shape of the leaves, and a corruption of "pierce", because it was formerly used to treat (or pierce) kidney stones. Another is that it comes from the French perce-pierre, meaning "stone-piercer" because of its habit of growing in shallow, stony soil.

== Distribution and status ==
Slender parsley-piert occurs throughout Western Europe, excluding the Mediterranean islands and the former Czechoslovakia, as far east as Turkey and southwards to North Africa. Although its scientific name originates from an American study, it is now considered to be an introduction there, where it is found in the eastern states from New York to Texas and on the west coast from Vancouver Island to Oregon. It is also known as an introduction in Australia and New Zealand.

It has not yet been assessed for a global threat status, but in Britain and France it is classes as LC (Least Concern), meaning that there is no evidence of a decline.

== Habitat and ecology ==
The Ellenberg values of slender parsley-piert in Britain are L=7, F=4, R=5, N=4, S=0, which means it favours moderate light, low moisture, slightly acidic conditions, low nutrients and is salt intolerant.

The main habitat for this species in Britain is probably U1 Festuca ovina community, which is an upland acid grassland, typically found on nutrient-poor, acidic soils. It is, however, also recorded on patches of bare soil and sparse vegetation in a variety of habitats, including CG2 Avenula pratensis, CG3 Bromus erectus and CG7 Festuca ovina grassland and OV22 Poa annua open vegetation community.

The downy mildew Peronospora oblatispora is the only disease known to infest this particular species.

== Uses ==
There are no recorded uses for slender parsley-piert, but presumably anything that common parsley-piert is used for would also apply to this species.
