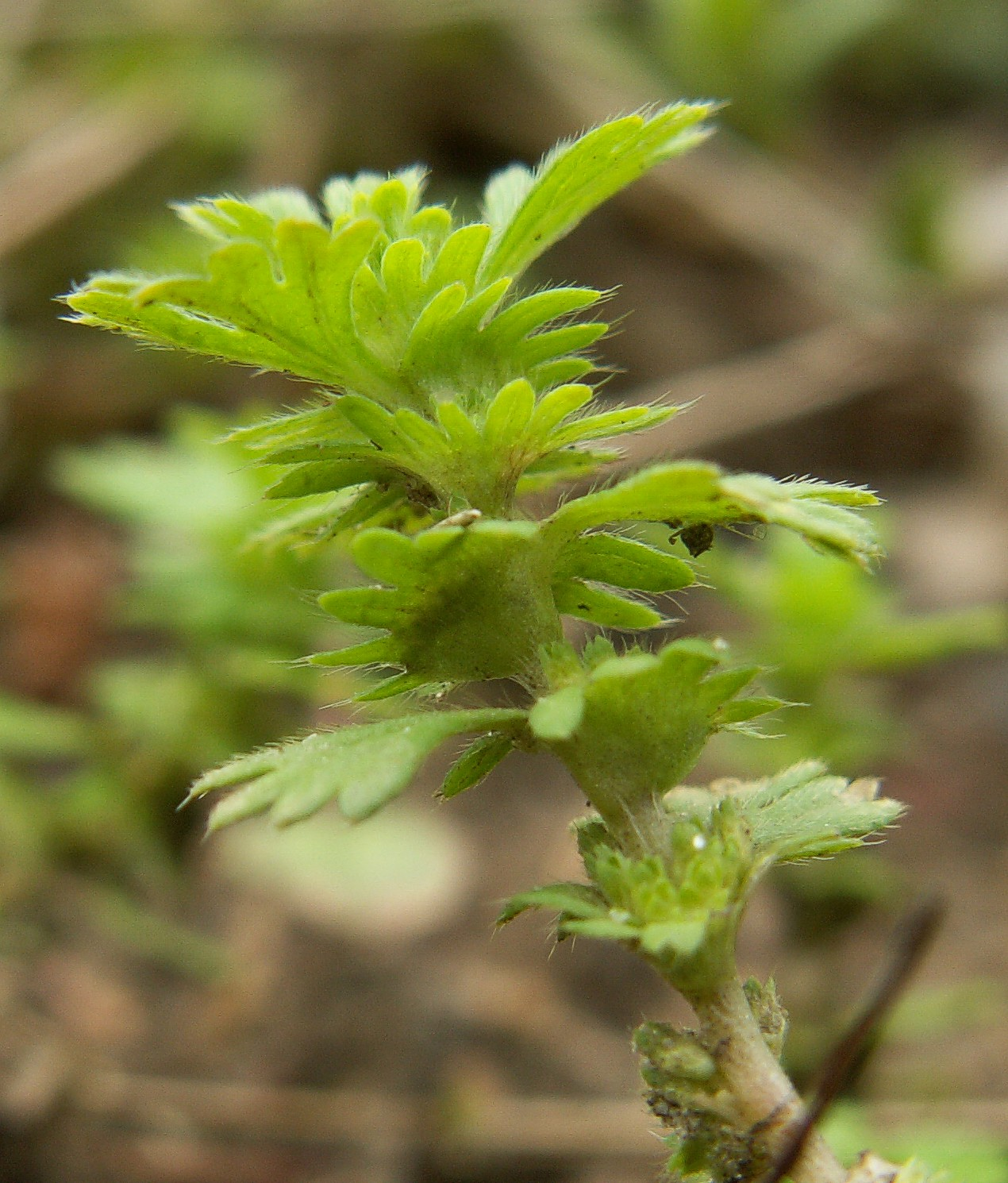
- Aphanes arvensis

Scientific classification
- Kingdom: Plantae
- Clade: Tracheophytes
- Clade: Angiosperms
- Clade: Eudicots
- Clade: Rosids
- Order: Rosales
- Family: Rosaceae
- Subfamily: Rosoideae
- Tribe: Potentilleae
- Subtribe: Fragariinae
- Genus: Aphanes; L.

= Aphanes =

Genus of flowering plants

Aphanes (parsley-piert) is a genus of around 20 species in the rose family (Rosaceae), native to Europe, Asia and Australia. A 2003 study indicated that Aphanes may belong to the genus Alchemilla, commonly called lady's-mantle. They are slender, annual prostrate herbs, much-branched with deeply lobed leaves, pilose (covered with soft hair) and on short petioles. The tiny green to yellow flowers without petals grow in clusters in the denticulate leaflike stipules.

Species include:

- Aphanes andicola Rothm.
- Aphanes arvensis L. – field parsley-piert, western lady's-mantle, parsley breakstone
- Aphanes australiana – Australian piert
- Aphanes australis Rydb.
- Aphanes cotopaxiensis Romoleroux & Frost-Olsen
- Aphanes cuneifolia (Nutt.) Rydb.
- Aphanes looseri Rothm.
- Aphanes microcarpa (Boiss. & Reut.) Rothm. (syn. A. australis, A. inexpectata) – slender parsley-piert
- Aphanes occidentalis (Nutt.) Rydb. – dew cup, lady's mantle
