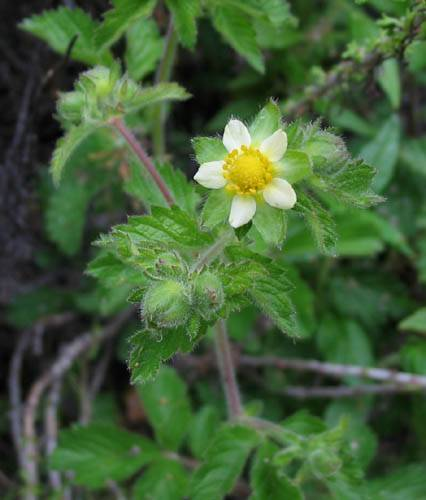
- Sticky cinquefoil, Drymocallis glandulosa

Scientific classification
- Kingdom: Plantae
- Clade: Embryophytes
- Clade: Tracheophytes
- Clade: Spermatophytes
- Clade: Angiosperms
- Clade: Eudicots
- Clade: Rosids
- Order: Rosales
- Family: Rosaceae
- Subfamily: Rosoideae
- Tribe: Potentilleae
- Subtribe: Fragariinae
- Genus: Drymocallis; Fourr. ex Rydb.

Species
- At least 3; see text

= Drymocallis =

Genus of flowering plants

Drymocallis is a genus of plants formerly (and sometimes still) included with the typical cinquefoils (Potentilla). It contains three species known or suspected to be protocarnivorous, but more cinquefoils might eventually be moved here:

== Taxonomy ==
The genus Drymocallis was described by Per Axel Rydberg in 1908 with him crediting Jules Pierre Fourreau. DNA sequence data suggests they are more closely related to Chamaerhodos and Dasiphora than to species such as Potentilla reptans (creeping cinquefoil) which make up the bulk of Potentilla.

According to Plants of the World Online the genus includes 24 species.

- Drymocallis arguta (Pursh) Rydb.
- Drymocallis arizonica Rydb.
- Drymocallis ashlandica (Greene) Rydb.
- Drymocallis calycina (Boiss. & Balansa) Soják
- Drymocallis campanulata (C.L.Hitchc.) Ertter
- Drymocallis convallaria (Rydb.) Rydb.
- Drymocallis corsica (Soleir. ex Lehm.) Kurtto
- Drymocallis cuneifolia Rydb.
- Drymocallis damghanensis Naderi & Faghir
- Drymocallis deseretica Ertter
- Drymocallis fissa (Nutt.) Rydb.
- Drymocallis geoides (M.Bieb.) Soják
- Drymocallis glabrata Rydb.
- Drymocallis glandulosa (Lindl.) Rydb.
- Drymocallis halacsyana (Siegfr. ex Degen) Kurtto & Strid
- Drymocallis hansenii (Greene) Rydb.
- Drymocallis inquinans (Turcz.) Soják
- Drymocallis lactea (Greene) Rydb.
- Drymocallis longisepala (Strid) Kurtto & Strid
- Drymocallis malacophylla (Borbás) Kurtto
- Drymocallis micropetala Rydb.
- Drymocallis modocana Ertter
- Drymocallis pseudorupestris (Rydb.) Rydb.
- Drymocallis regisborisii (Stoj.) Soják
- Drymocallis rhomboidea (Rydb.) Rydb.
- Drymocallis rupestris (L.) Soják
