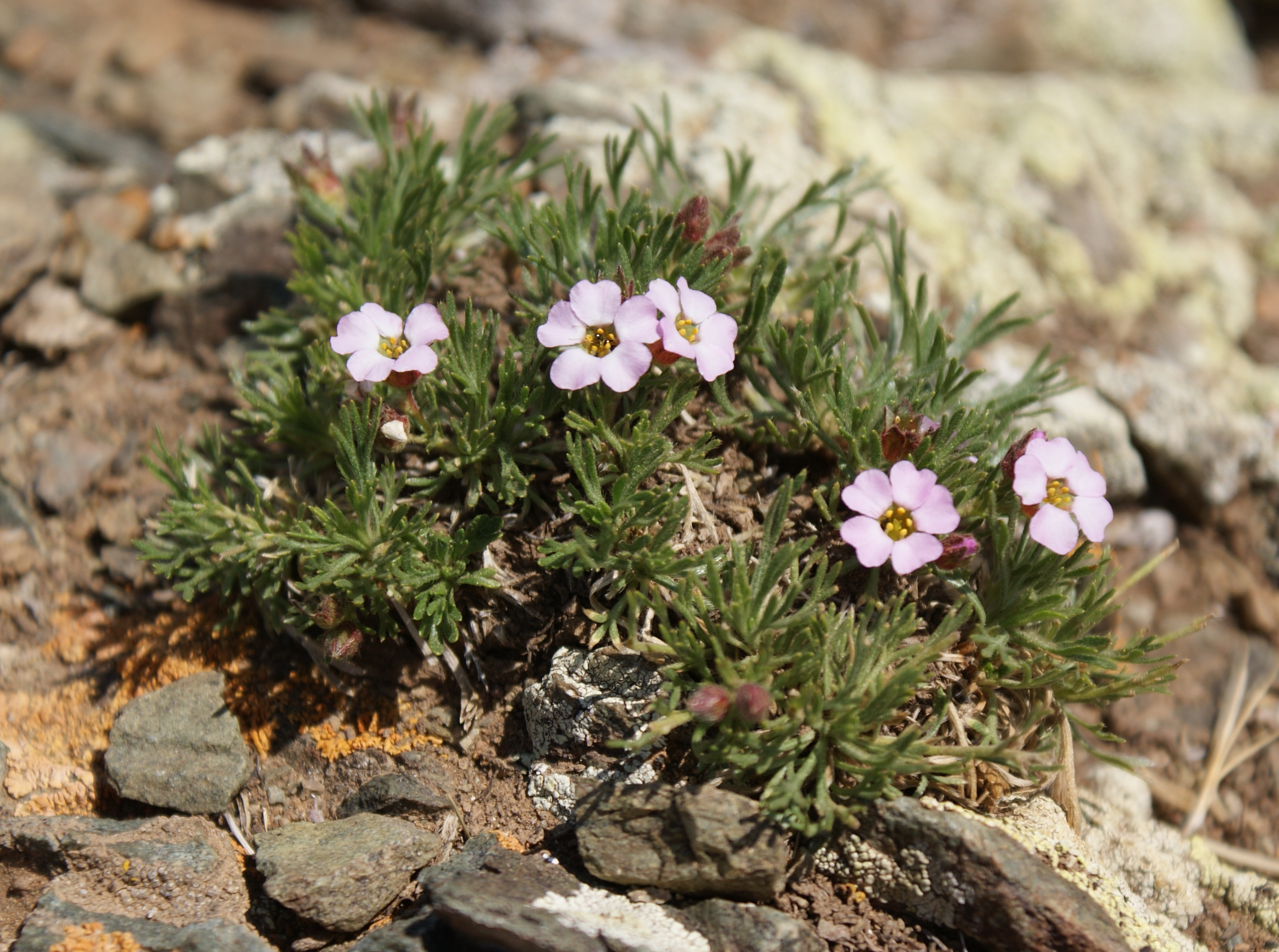

Scientific classification
- Kingdom: Plantae
- Clade: Tracheophytes
- Clade: Angiosperms
- Clade: Eudicots
- Clade: Rosids
- Order: Rosales
- Family: Rosaceae
- Genus: Chamaerhodos
- Species: C. altaica

Binomial name
- Chamaerhodos altaica (Laxm.) Bunge 1829

= Chamaerhodos altaica =

Species of flowering plant

Chamaerhodos altaica is a species of plant in the family Rosaceae that is native to China.
