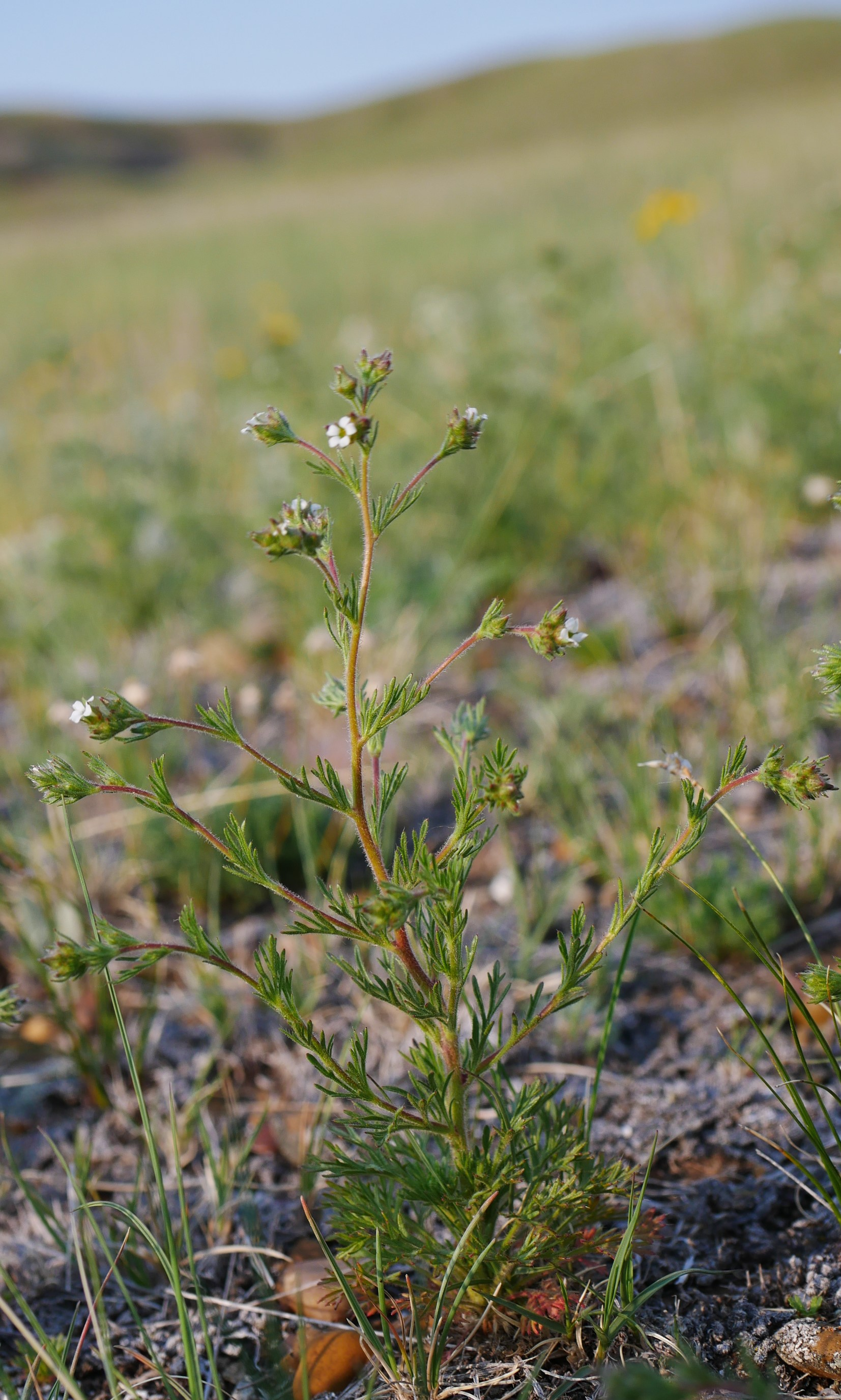

Conservation status
- Secure (NatureServe)

Scientific classification
- Kingdom: Plantae
- Clade: Tracheophytes
- Clade: Angiosperms
- Clade: Eudicots
- Clade: Rosids
- Order: Rosales
- Family: Rosaceae
- Genus: Chamaerhodos
- Species: C. erecta

Binomial name
- Chamaerhodos erecta (L.) Bunge

= Chamaerhodos erecta =

Species of flowering plant

Chamaerhodos erecta is a species of plant in the family Rosaceae that is native to Asia and North America. It flowers between June through August and grows on prairies, outcrops, and exposed ridges on sandy or rocky soil.
