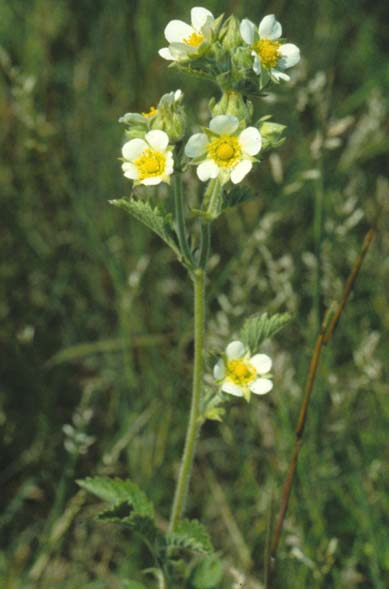

Conservation status
- Secure (NatureServe)

Scientific classification
- Kingdom: Plantae
- Clade: Tracheophytes
- Clade: Angiosperms
- Clade: Eudicots
- Clade: Rosids
- Order: Rosales
- Family: Rosaceae
- Genus: Drymocallis
- Species: D. arguta

Binomial name
- Drymocallis arguta (Pursh) Rydb.

Synonyms
- Potentilla arguta Pursh

= Drymocallis arguta =

Species of flowering plant

Drymocallis arguta, commonly known as the tall cinquefoil, prairie cinquefoil, or sticky cinquefoil, is a perennial herbaceous plant native to North America. It was formerly included with the typical cinquefoils in the genus Potentilla.

== Description ==
The leaves are pinnately compound with an uneven number of leaflets, most commonly 7 to 11. Most leaves are found in a rosette at the base of the plant, but there are some leaves arranged alternately along the flowering stem. Leaves are densely covered in short and somewhat sticky hairs (trichomes).

The flowers are arranged in a tight cluster (cyme) on a long stem from 12–40 in (30–100 cm) tall. They are strawberry-like, with five white or cream petals, five pointed green sepals between the petals, and a round head of pistils in the center with more than 20 stamens in a ring around it. Nectar is secreted from a ring below the pistils.

The flowers are small and the nectar and pollen are easy for short-tongued insects to reach. Small short-tongued bees visit the flowers to gather or feed on pollen and nectar, hoverflies feed on pollen, and wasps occasionally feed on nectar.

The pistils of pollinated flowers develop into a head of many small brown seeds, which are enclosed by a cup made up of the dried-up sepals.

The root system is a taproot with short rhizomes at the surface, which allow the plant to form tight clumps.

Drymocallis arguta is thought to be a protocarnivorous plant. In a 1999 experiment, several plants in the Pacific Northwest were tested for the carnivorous syndrome, using the digestion of proteins as the diagnostic tool to determine which plants appeared to produce protease enzymes capable of breaking down potential prey. D. arguta displayed a capability to digest and absorb the ^{14}C-labeled algal protein placed on its sticky trichomes. However, it is not known whether the digestive enzymes were produced by the plant itself or surface microbes.
