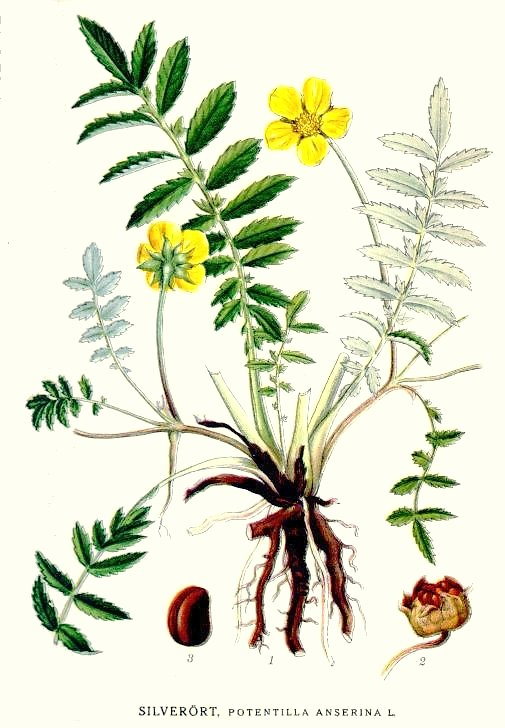
- Potentilla anserina

Scientific classification
- Kingdom: Plantae
- Clade: Tracheophytes
- Clade: Angiosperms
- Clade: Eudicots
- Clade: Rosids
- Order: Rosales
- Family: Rosaceae
- Subfamily: Rosoideae
- Tribe: Potentilleae

= Potentilleae =

Tribe of flowering plants

Potentilleae is a tribe of the rose family, Rosaceae.

The type genus is Potentilla.

== Taxonomy ==
Potentilleae contains 2 subtribes and 16 genera:

- Potentillinae
  - Argentina (silverweeds)
  - Potentilla (cinquefoils, tormentils, barren strawberries)
- Fragariinae
  - Alchemilla (lady's mantle)
  - Aphanes (parsley-piert)
  - Chamaecallis
  - Chamaerhodos
  - Comarum
  - Dasiphora
  - Drymocallis
  - Fragaria (strawberries)
  - Potaninia
  - Sibbaldia
  - Sibbaldianthe
