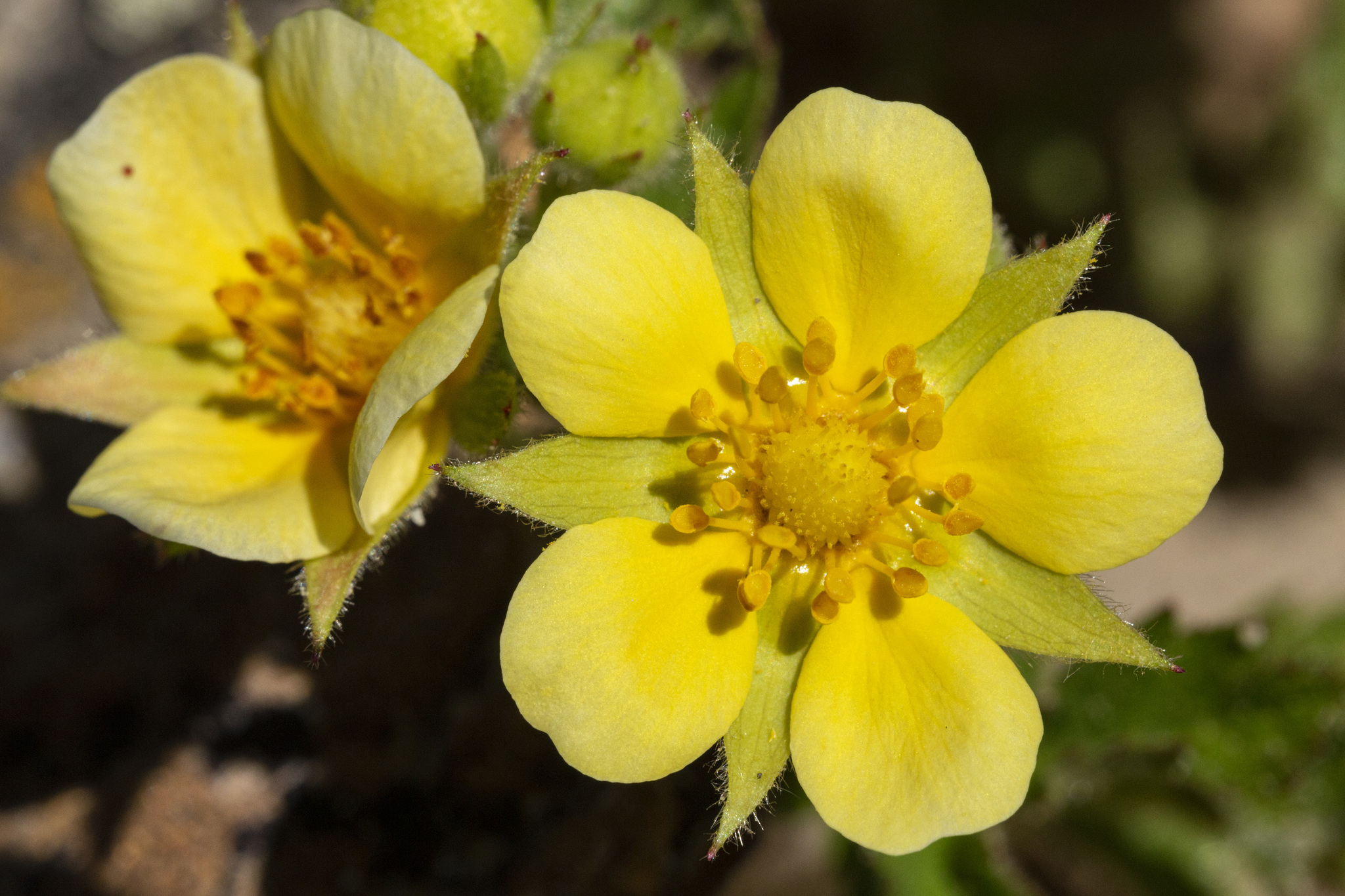
- Drymocallis fissa flower, Lower Pine Ridge, Wyoming

Conservation status
- Apparently Secure (NatureServe)

Scientific classification
- Kingdom: Plantae
- Clade: Tracheophytes
- Clade: Angiosperms
- Clade: Eudicots
- Clade: Rosids
- Order: Rosales
- Family: Rosaceae
- Genus: Drymocallis
- Species: D. fissa

Binomial name
- Drymocallis fissa (Nutt.) Rydb.

Synonyms
- Potentilla scopulorum Greene; Potentilla fissa Nutt.

= Drymocallis fissa =

Species of plant in the genus Drymocallis

Drymocallis fissa, the bigflower cinquefoil, also known as the leafy cinquefoil, leafy drymocallis, or wood beauty, is a small plant also sometimes classified as Potentilla fissa. It is a herbaceous plant with a thick taproot known for its moderately hairy leaves, redish leaf stems, and relatively large yellow flowers. It is native to foothills and lower mountains the Rocky Mountain region in the western United States.

== Description ==
Individuals of this species have numerous stems that come from the top of a single rootstalk with branched persistent woody stems (caudex). The leaves are pinnate with 7-13 slightly hairy leaflets. Leaflet edges are incised to small points. The stems are hairy and redish. Plant usually most often has a cyme with multiple flowers per stem that is taller than the leaves coming up from the plant's base. Plants usually grow between 15–35 cm tall, but occasionally will be as short as 12 cm or as tall as 45 cm.

=== Flowers and fruit ===
The flowers are large as the common name suggests, 1.9 to 2.5 cm across, with five petals, colored bright yellow to creamy yellow. The center of the flower is also yellow and the anthers are long, helping to distinguish it from other species. In Colorado Drymocallis fissa blooms in late spring to the very beginning of summer. The dry seed heads follow in July.

== Taxonomy ==
This species was first described as Potentilla fissa by the widely cited botanist Thomas Nuttall in 1840, placing it with the other species in Potentilla. In 1898 the botanist Per Axel Rydberg published a paper arguing for a new classification as Drymocallis fissa. While Rydberg's classification is widely used, Nuttall's placement in Potentilla continues to be used in some books in the 21st century.

=== Names ===
The genus Drymocallis was named by Rydberg using botanical Greek, "drymos" meaning woods and "kallos" meaning beauty. This also gives many plants in the genus as "wood beauty" or "woodbeauty".

The previous classification as in the genus Cinquefoil also has given rise to common names for this species, such as "bigflower cinquefoil" and "leafy cinquefoil".

== Distribution ==
Drymocallis fissa can be found from northern New Mexico to Alberta, Canada, but is most commonly found in the Front Range mountains and lower foothills in Colorado and Medicine Bow Mountains of Wyoming. It has also been reliably observed in the Black Hills of South Dakota. The USDA records observations in San Miguel County, New Mexico; Carbon County, Montana; Stillwater County, Montana; and Custer County, Idaho as well as Oregon and Utah, but these are suspected of being misidentifications of other species.

== Habitat and ecology ==
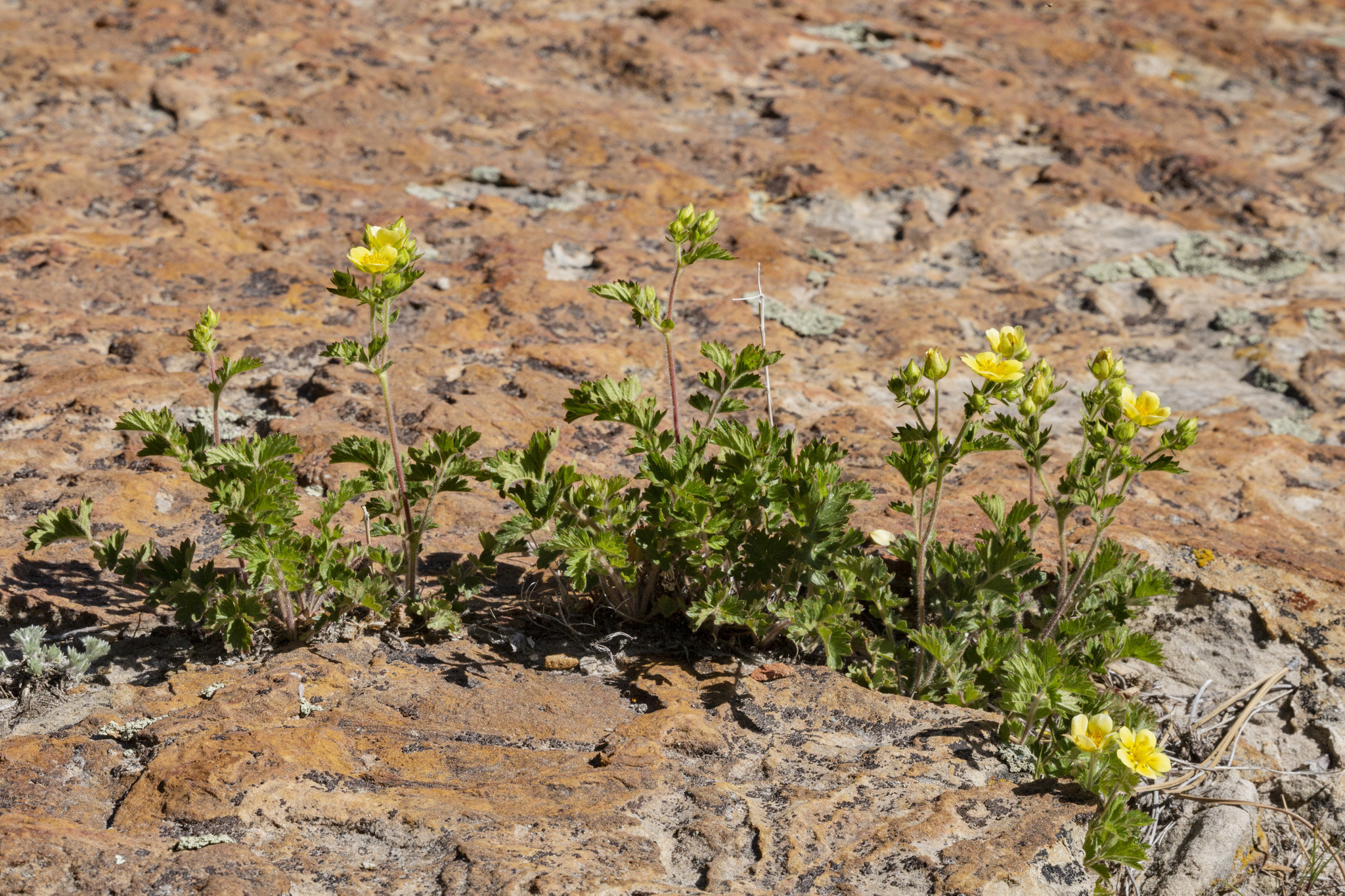
Drymocallis fissa, Lower Pine Ridge, Wyoming

Bigflower cinquefoil is a perennial plant that often grows in mixed woodland habitats in the lower foothills, with sagebrush, on rocky slopes, and in open meadows at higher elevations. It is found from 1600–3000 meters in altitude. It prefers disturbed and rocky areas with more water, but not waterlogged soils.

Drymocallis fissa was evaluated by NatureServe as apparently secure (G4) in 1994. This means that at a global level they think it has fairly low risk of extinction or collapse due to an extensive range and/or many populations, but with possible cause for some concern. It was additionally rated as vulnerable (S3) in Wyoming.
