= Aphanes cotopaxiensis =

Conservation status
- Vulnerable (IUCN 3.1)

Scientific classification
- Kingdom: Plantae
- Clade: Tracheophytes
- Clade: Angiosperms
- Clade: Eudicots
- Clade: Rosids
- Order: Rosales
- Family: Rosaceae
- Genus: Aphanes
- Species: A. cotopaxiensis

Binomial name
- Aphanes cotopaxiensis Romol. & Frost-Ols.

Species of flowering plant

Aphanes cotopaxiensis is a species of plant in the family Rosaceae. It is endemic to Ecuador.
