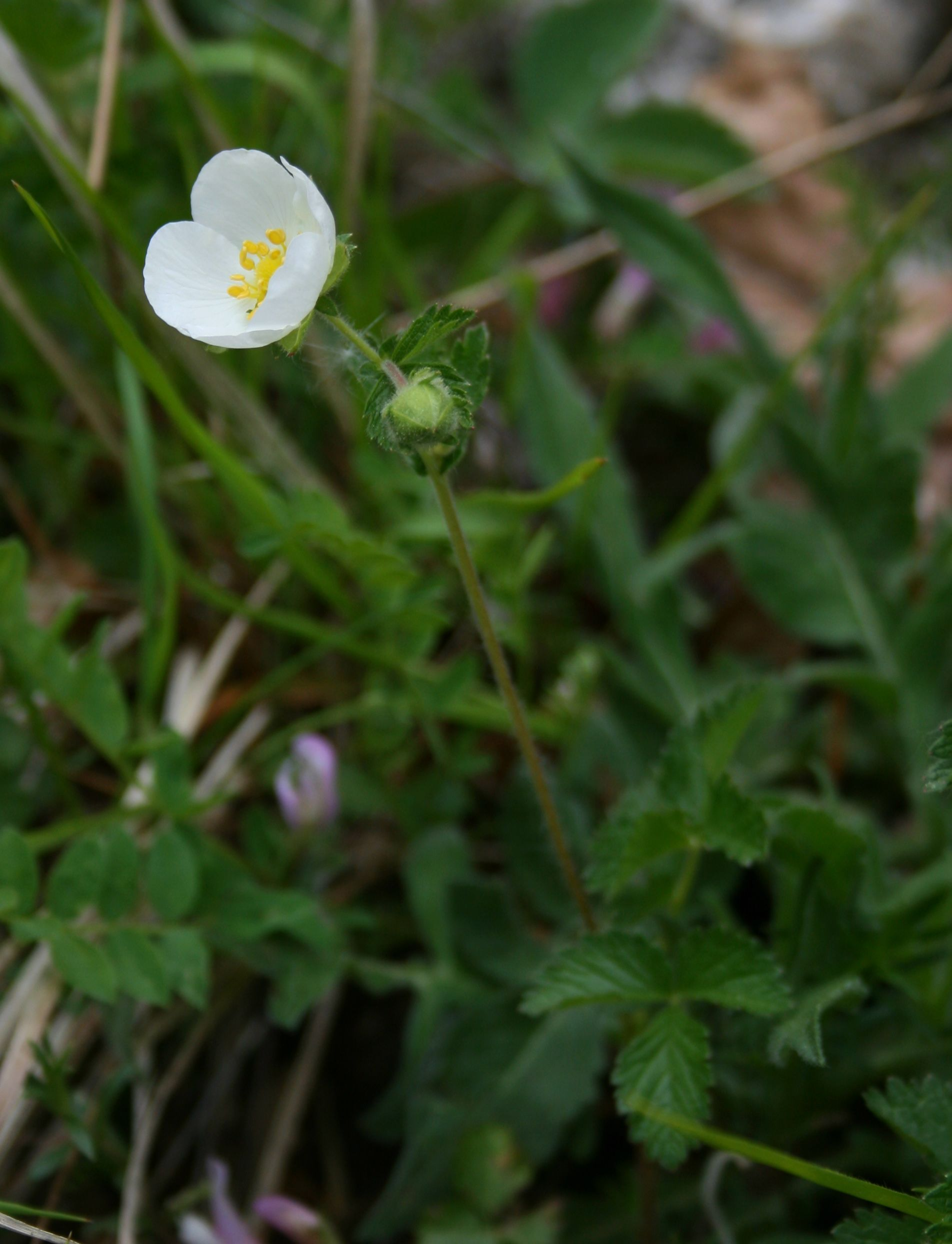

Scientific classification
- Kingdom: Plantae
- Clade: Tracheophytes
- Clade: Angiosperms
- Clade: Eudicots
- Clade: Rosids
- Order: Rosales
- Family: Rosaceae
- Genus: Drymocallis
- Species: D. rupestris

Binomial name
- Drymocallis rupestris (L.) Soják

Synonyms
- Potentilla rupestris L.

= Drymocallis rupestris =

Species of flowering plant

Drymocallis rupestris, the rock cinquefoil, is a small plant of Eurasia.
