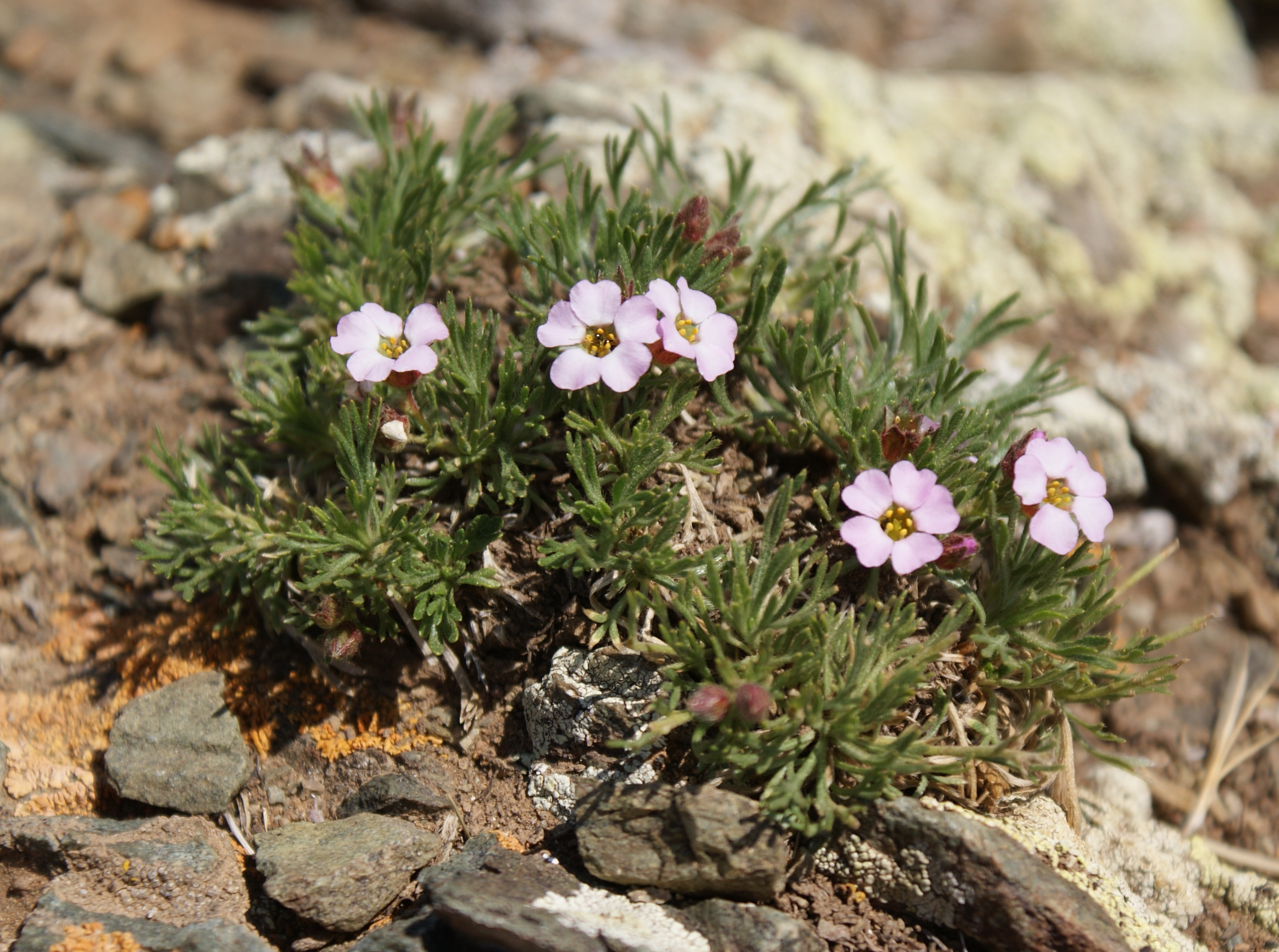
- Chamaerhodos altaica

Scientific classification
- Kingdom: Plantae
- Clade: Tracheophytes
- Clade: Angiosperms
- Clade: Eudicots
- Clade: Rosids
- Order: Rosales
- Family: Rosaceae
- Subfamily: Rosoideae
- Tribe: Potentilleae
- Subtribe: Fragariinae
- Genus: Chamaerhodos; Bunge

Type species
- Chamaerhodos erecta

Species
- See text

= Chamaerhodos =

Genus of flowering plants

Chamaerhodos is a genus of plants in the family Rosaceae

== Species ==
- Chamaerhodos altaica (Laxm.) Bunge
- Chamaerhodos canescens J.Krause
- Chamaerhodos corymbosa Murav.
- Chamaerhodos erecta (L.) Bunge
- Chamaerhodos grandiflora (Pall. ex Schult.) Bunge
- Chamaerhodos sabulosa Bunge
- Chamaerhodos trifida Ledeb.
