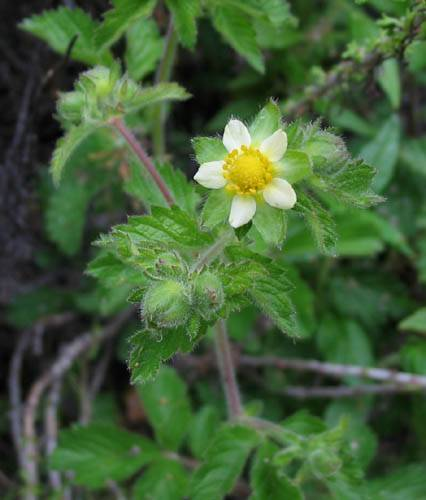
- In Circle X Ranch Park, Santa Monica Mountains, California

Conservation status
- Secure (NatureServe)

Scientific classification
- Kingdom: Plantae
- Clade: Tracheophytes
- Clade: Angiosperms
- Clade: Eudicots
- Clade: Rosids
- Order: Rosales
- Family: Rosaceae
- Genus: Drymocallis
- Species: D. glandulosa

Binomial name
- Drymocallis glandulosa (Lindl.) Rydb.

Synonyms
- Potentilla glandulosa Lindl.

= Drymocallis glandulosa =

Species of flowering plant

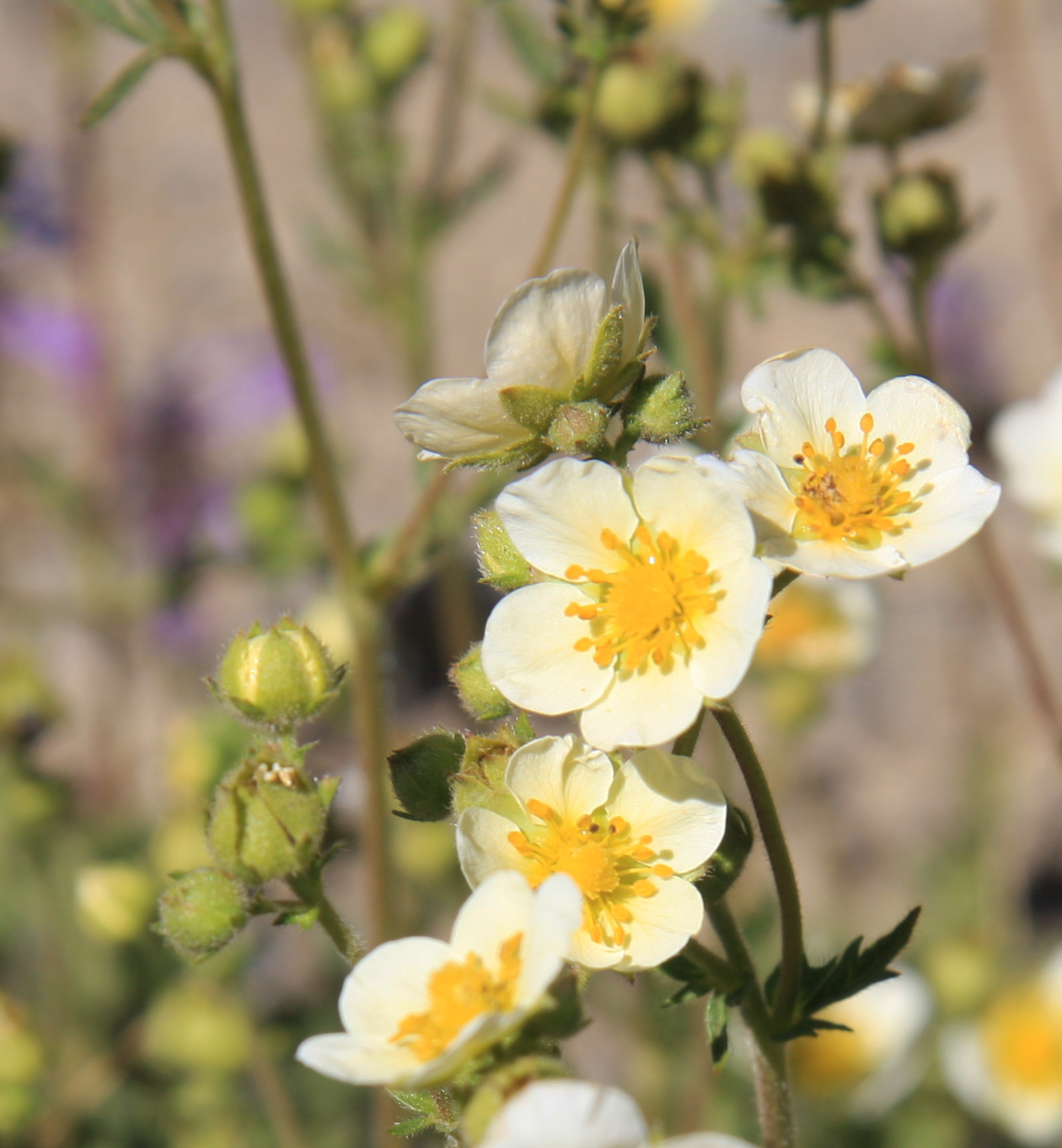
Close up of flower

Drymocallis glandulosa, formerly Potentilla glandulosa, known by the common names Douglas' wood beauty and sticky cinquefoil, is a plant species in the family Rosaceae.

It is native to western North America from southwestern Canada through the far western United States and California, into Baja California. It is widespread and can be found in many types of habitats.

== Description ==
Drymocallis glandulosa is generally erect in form but it may be small and tuftlike, measuring just a few centimeters high, or tall and slender, approaching 1 metre (3.3 ft) in height. It may or may not have rhizomes.

It is usually coated in hairs, many of which are glandular, giving the plant a sticky texture. The leaves are each divided into several leaflets, with one long terminal leaflet and a few smaller ones widely spaced on each side.

The inflorescence is a cyme of 2 to 30 flowers which are variable in color and size. Each has usually five petals up to a centimetre long which may be white to pale yellow to gold.

=== Varieties ===
It is highly variable and there are many varieties and subspecies, some of which intergrade and are not clearly defined. They include:

- Drymocallis glandulosa var. glandulosa
- Drymocallis glandulosa var. reflexa
- Drymocallis glandulosa var. viscida
- Drymocallis glandulosa var. wrangelliana

== Ecology ==
The plant is more common after its habitat is cleared or disturbed, such as by wildfire, clearcutting, or heavy grazing.

It is an important food for several species of mice, including the western harvest mouse, cactus mouse, and California mouse.
