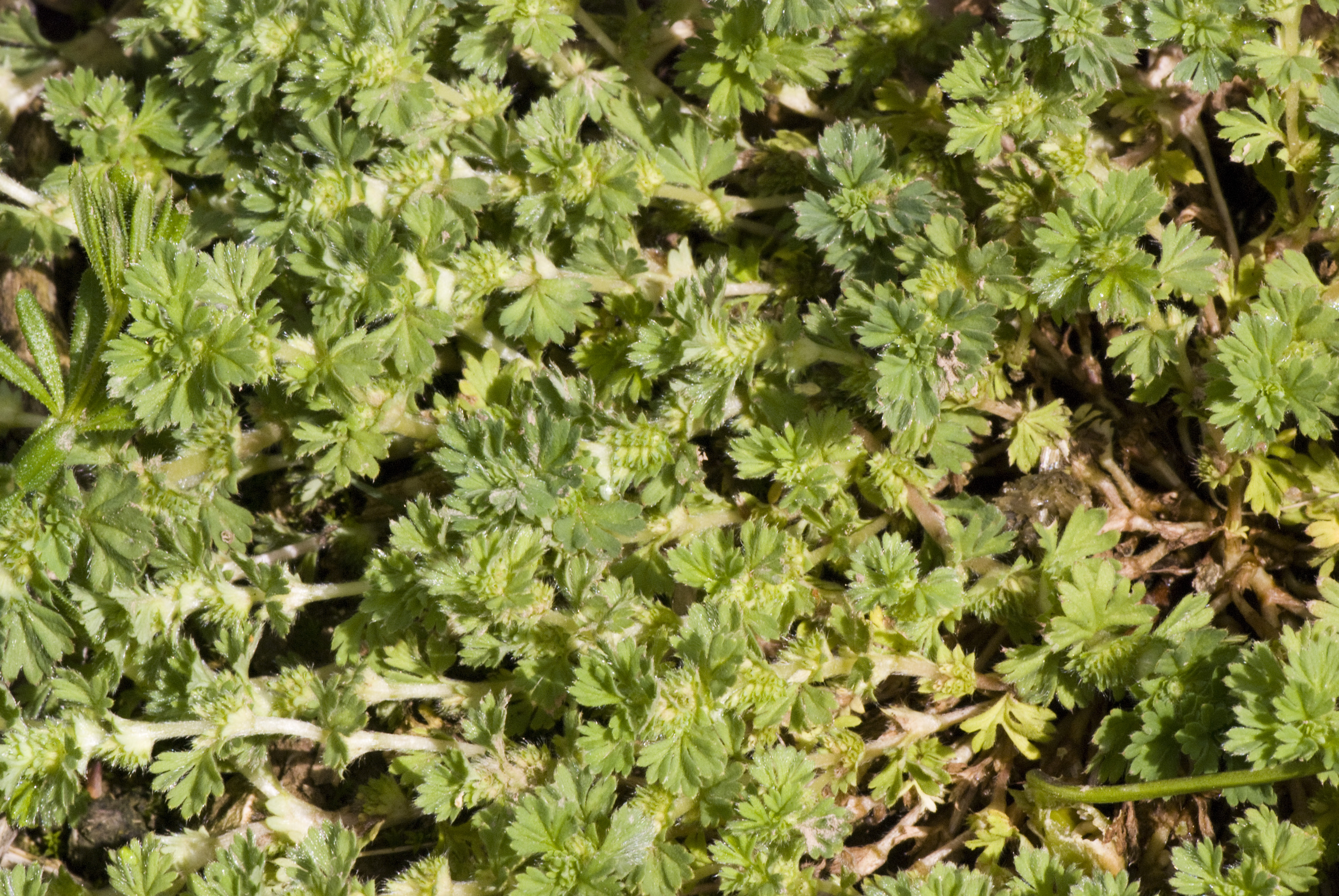

Scientific classification
- Kingdom: Plantae
- Clade: Embryophytes
- Clade: Tracheophytes
- Clade: Angiosperms
- Clade: Eudicots
- Clade: Rosids
- Order: Rosales
- Family: Rosaceae
- Genus: Alchemilla
- Species: A. arvensis

Binomial name
- Alchemilla arvensis (L.) Scop.

Synonyms
- List: Alchemilla aphanes Leers; Alchemilla arvensis var. glabra Greene; Alchemilla arvensis var. occidentalis (Nutt.) Piper; Alchemilla cuneifolia Nutt.; Alchemilla delicatula Sennen; Alchemilla monandra Stokes; Alchemilla occidentalis Nutt.; Alchemilla triloba Gilib.; Aphanes arvensis L.; Aphanes cuneifolia (Nutt.) Rydb.; Aphanes delicatula Sennen; Aphanes occidentalis (Nutt.) Rydb.; Aphanes triloba Gilib.; Aphanes vulgaris Schur; Percepier arvensis (L.) Moench; Potentilla arvensis (L.) Christenh. & Väre

= Alchemilla arvensis =

Species of flowering plant

Alchemilla arvensis (syn. Aphanes arvensis), known as parsley-piert, is a sprawling, downy plant common all over the British Isles where it grows on arable fields and bare wastelands, particularly in dry sites. The short-stalked leaves have three segments each lobed at the tip. It flowers from April to September. The tiny green flower has four sepals and no petals; stipules form a leaf-like cup, enclosing the flower.

== Name ==
The name of parsley piert has nothing to do with parsley. It is a corruption of the French perce-pierre, meaning 'stone-piercer' and was given to the plant because of its habit of growing in shallow, stony soil and emerging between stones. As in the case of saxifrage (from the Latin meaning 'stone-breaker') it was wrongly assumed that the plant could pierce stones; and it was thought that a medicine made of parsley piert would break up stones in the bladder and kidneys. Old folk-names for the plant include colicwort and bowel-hive-grass (hive meant inflammation), showing that it was also used for intestinal ailments.

The previous genus name of Aphanes comes from a Greek word meaning "unseen" or "unnoticed", which precisely describes this tiny plant. Nevertheless, parsley piert is a very common and widespread weed of cultivated ground, whether acidic or not.

== Description ==
Alchemilla arvensis is 2–20 centimetres (3/4–7 3/4 in) high, leaves 2–10 millimetres (1/16–3/8 in) long, fan-shaped, short-stalked, with 3 deep-toothed main lobes. On display from April to October, the flowers are minute, less than 2 mm wide, in dense clusters in leraf-axils, surrounded by cups formed by leaf-stipules; they have four sepals and an epicalyx, but no petals, and usually one stamen. The fruit is a pointed oval.

== Distribution and habitat ==
It can be found in most of Europe including Britain, east to Iran on arable land, bare ground, on paths, on dry or chalky soils.

== Uses ==
The leaves have a slightly acidic flavor and are edible raw.

The 17th-century herbalist Nicholas Culpeper, recommended parsley piert for use in salads, although it would be difficult to gather sufficient quantities of such a tiny plant for a reasonable meal. Culpeper also recommends the plant to gentlemen for eating as a winter pickle in addition to the pickled samphire to which they were accustomed.

== Gallery ==
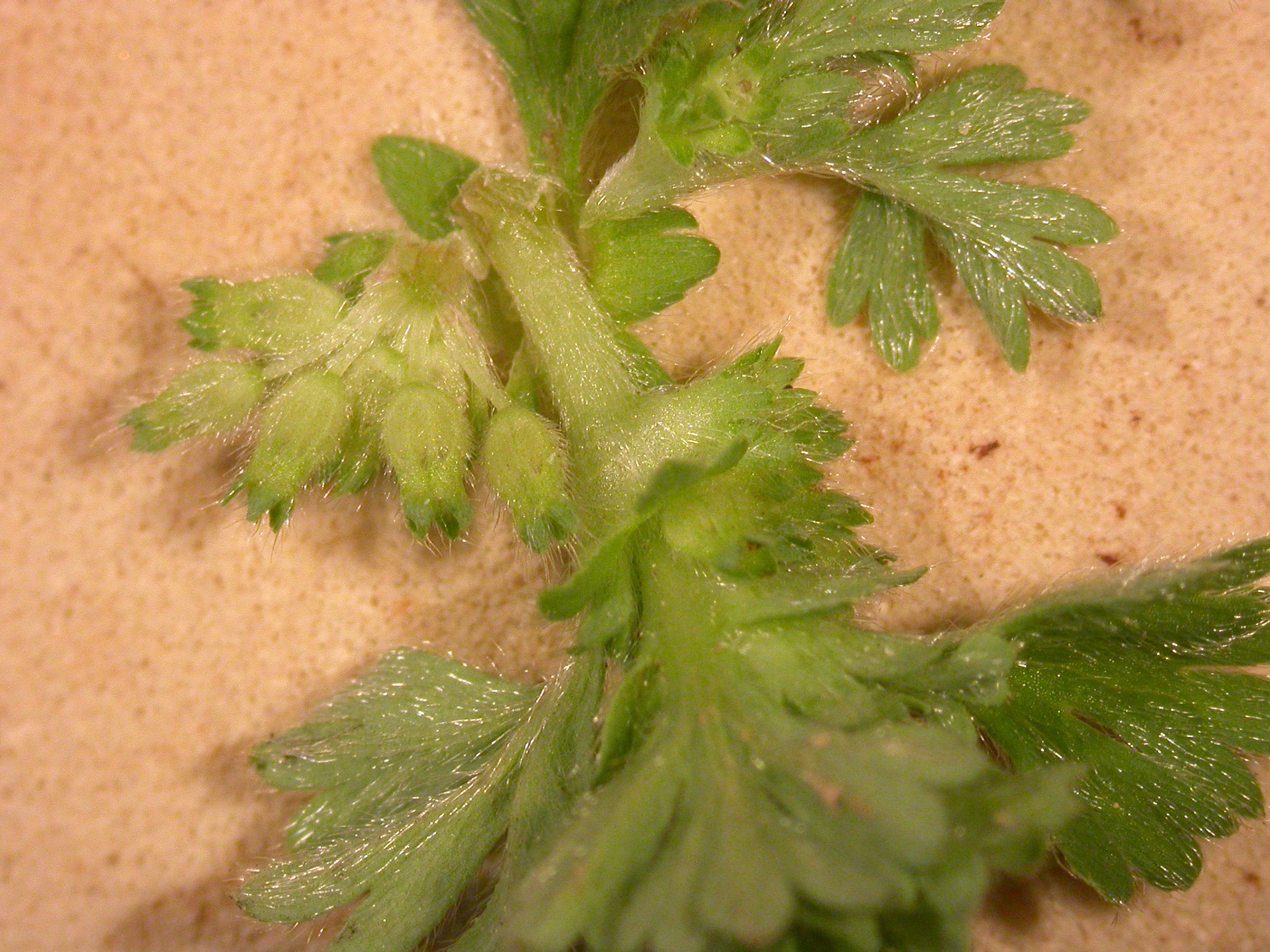

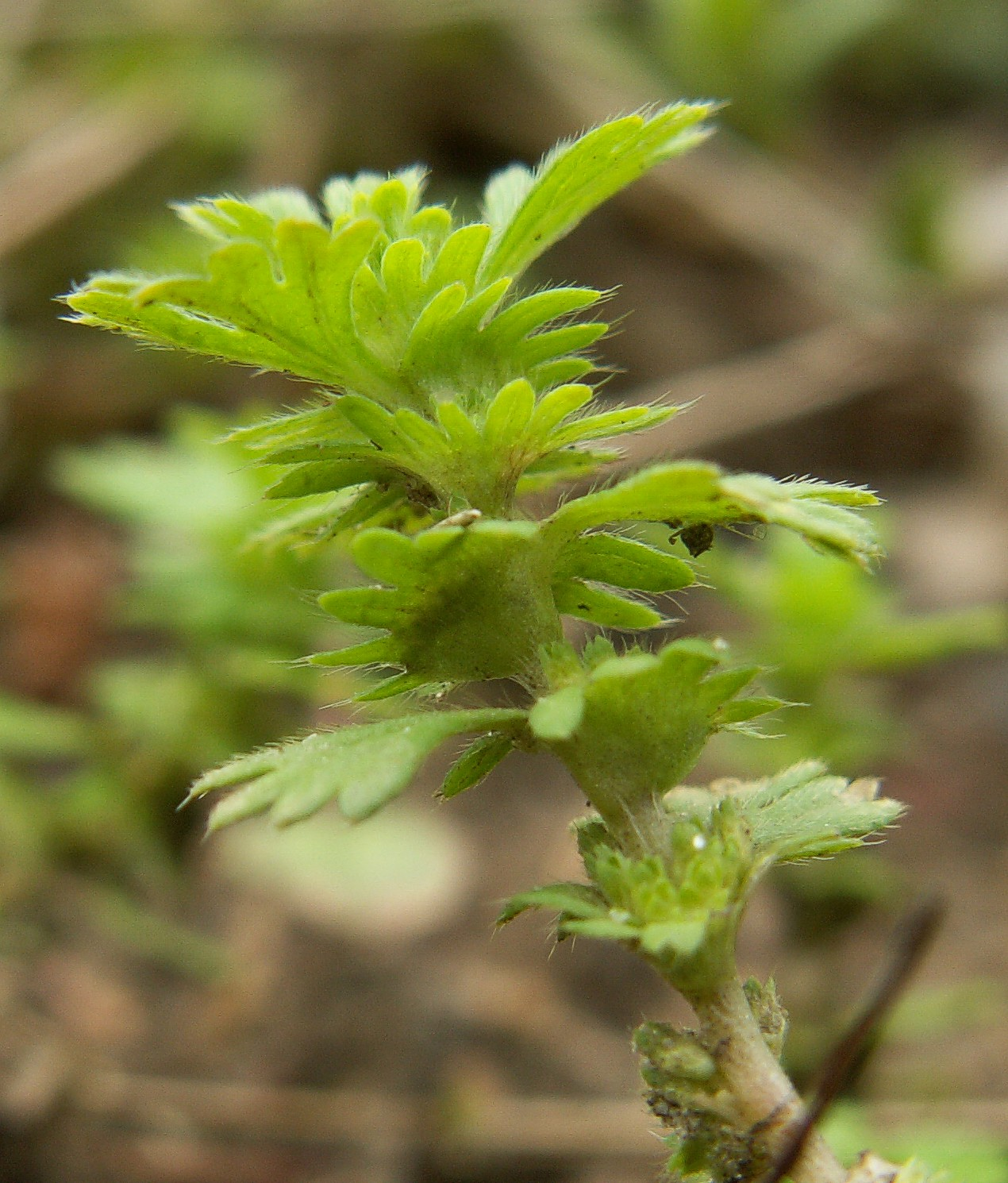

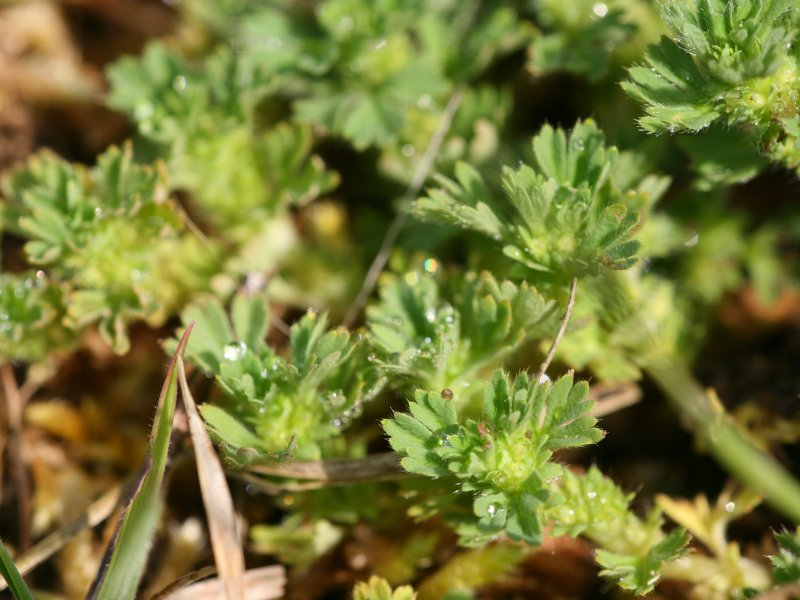

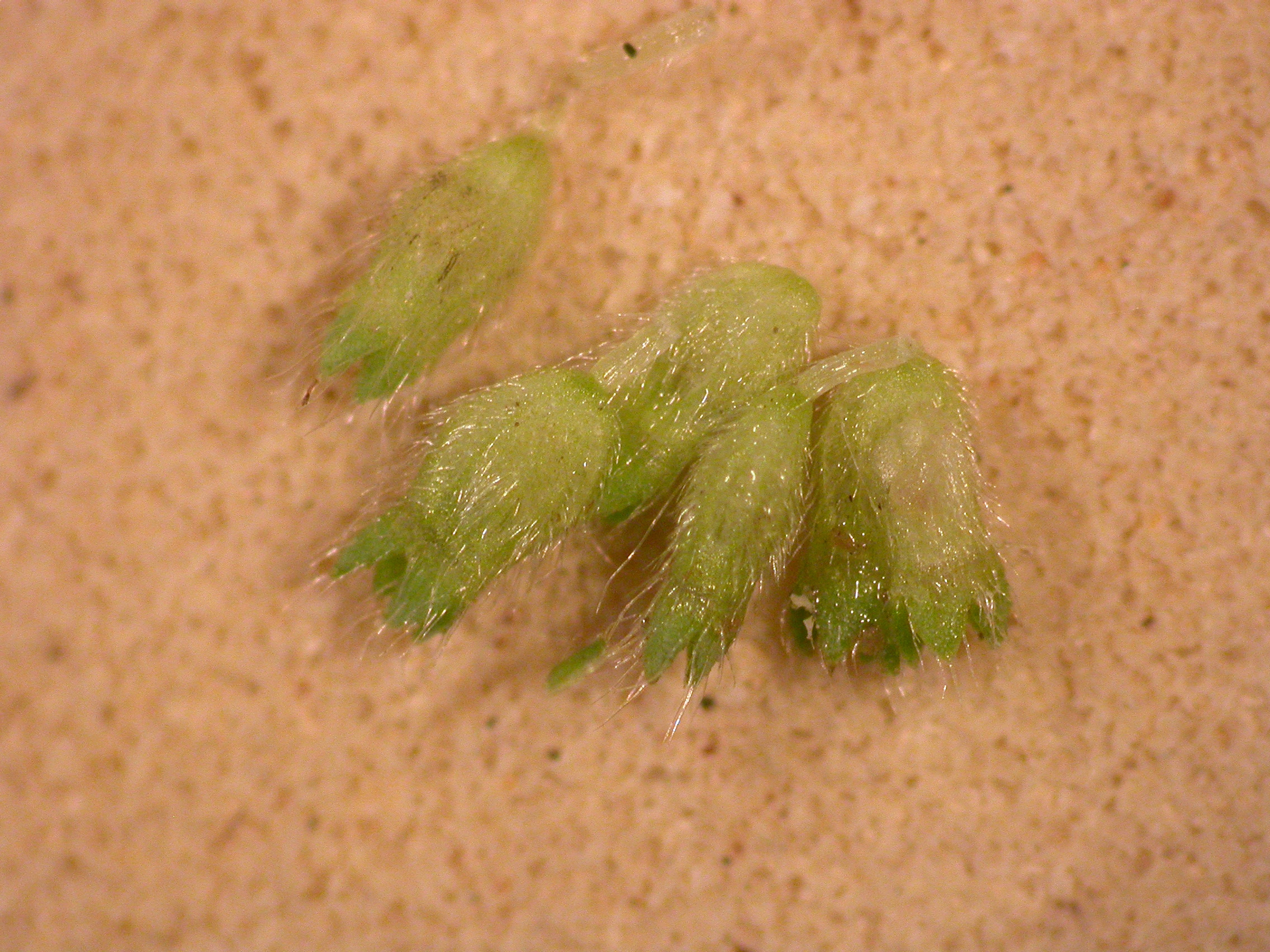

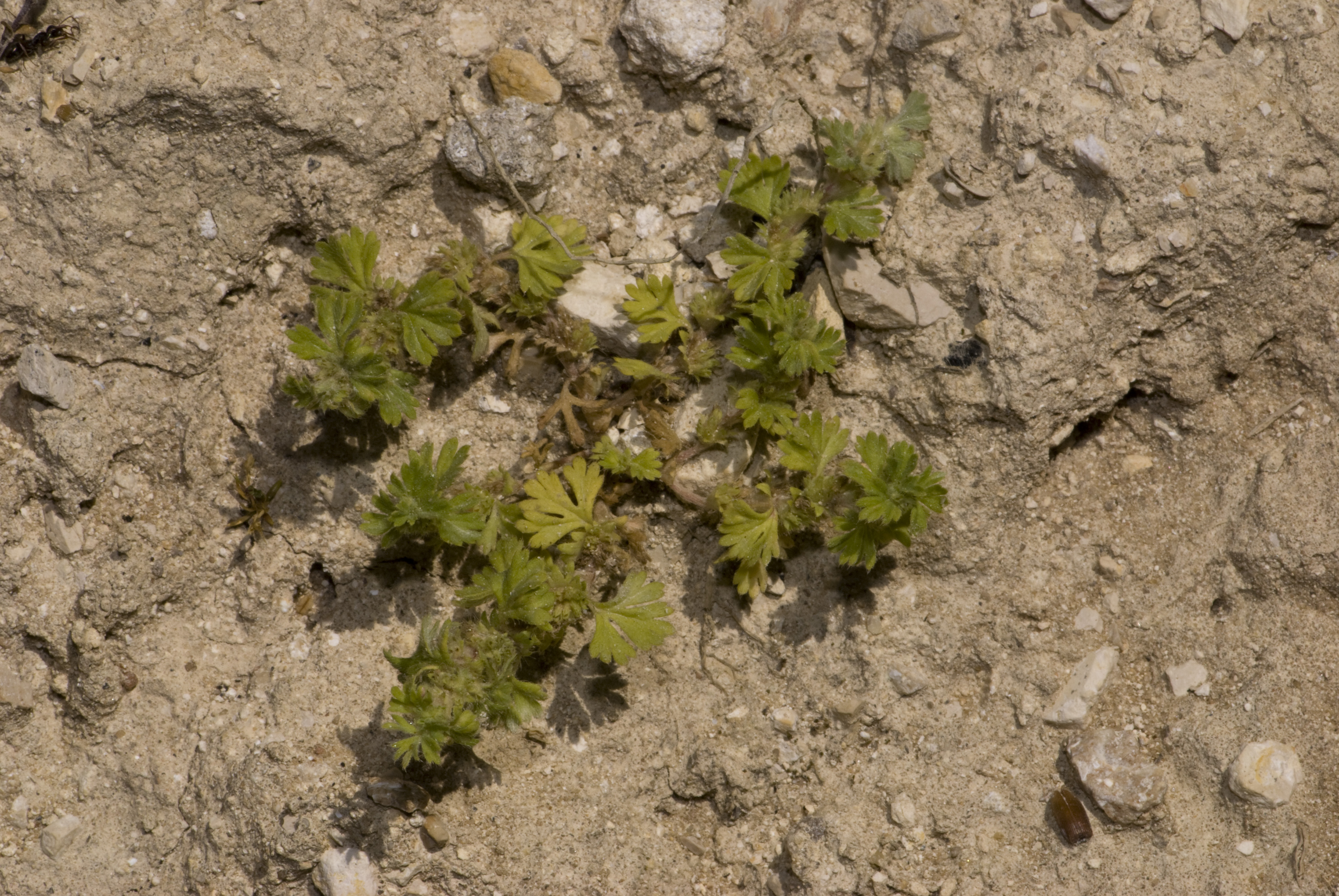

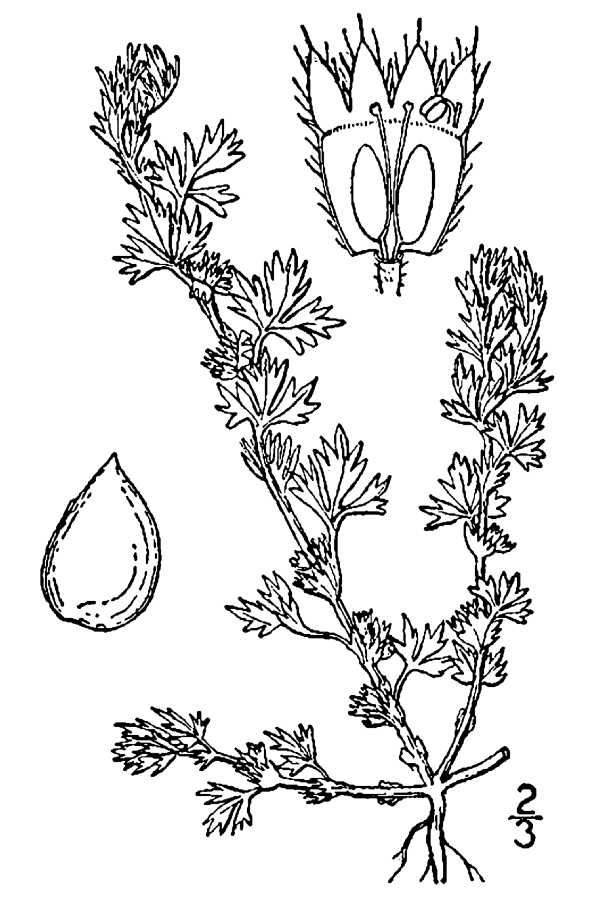

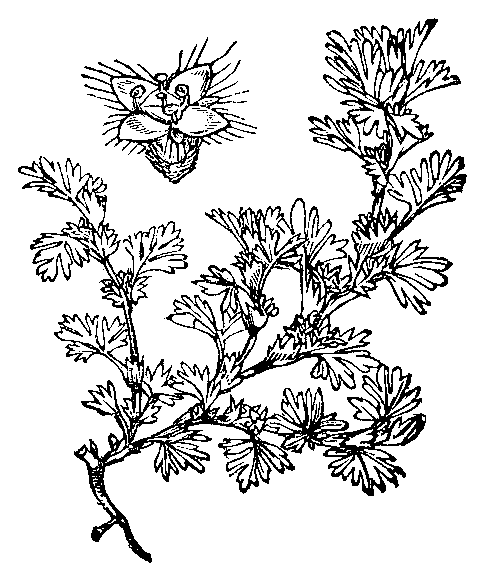
