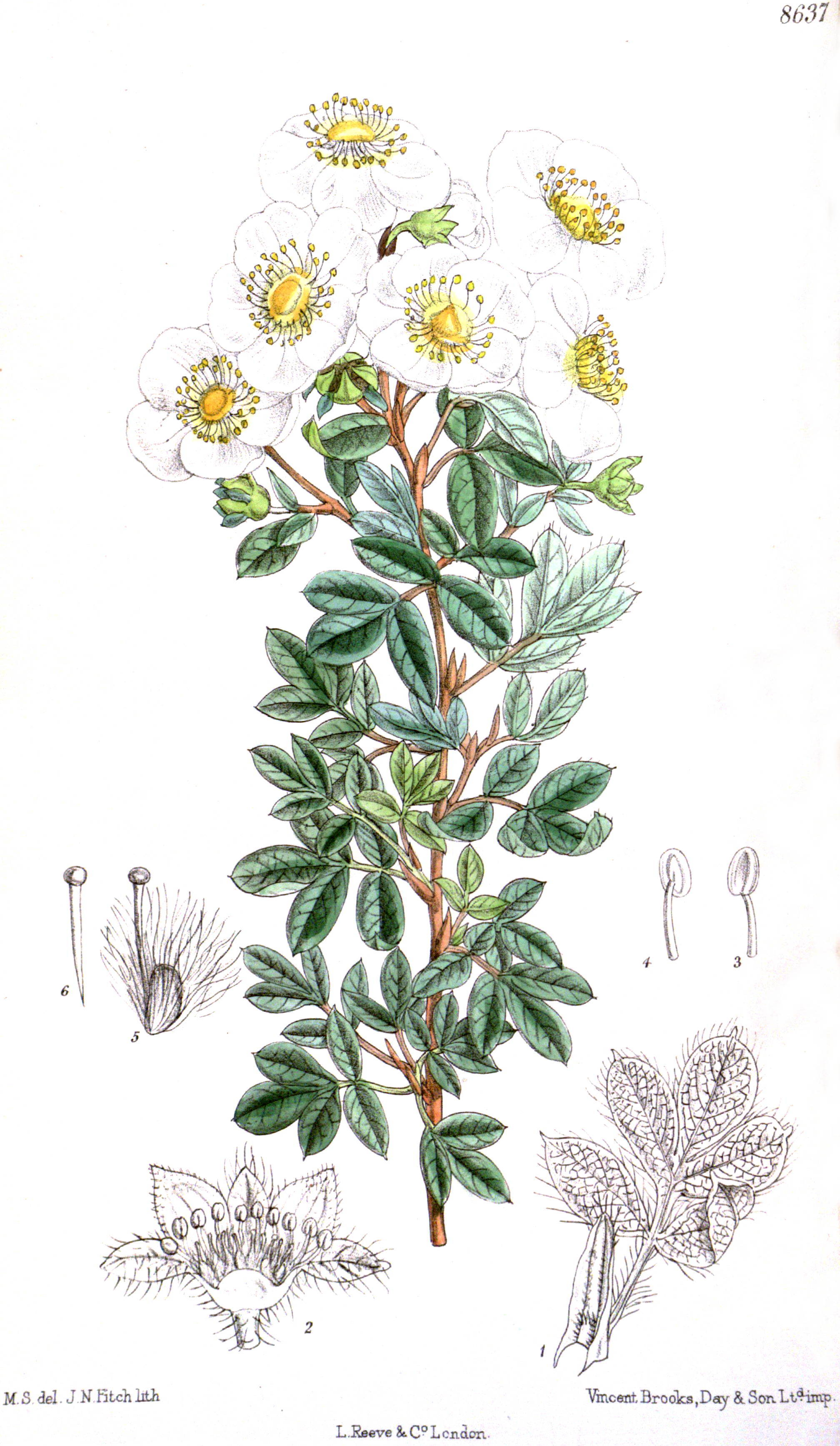
- Illustration from Curtis's Botanical Magazine, 1915, as Potentilla davurica var. veitchii

Scientific classification
- Kingdom: Plantae
- Clade: Tracheophytes
- Clade: Angiosperms
- Clade: Eudicots
- Clade: Rosids
- Order: Rosales
- Family: Rosaceae
- Genus: Dasiphora
- Species: D. fruticosa
- Variety: D. f. var. veitchii

Trinomial name
- Dasiphora fruticosa var. veitchii (E.H.Wilson) Nakai

Synonyms
- Dasiphora veitchii (E.H.Wilson) Soják; Potentilla arbuscula var. veitchii (E.H.Wilson) Liou; Potentilla davurica Nestl.; Potentilla davurica var. veitchii (E.H.Wilson) Jesson; Potentilla fruticosa var. veitchii (E.H.Wilson) Bean; Potentilla veitchii E.H.Wilson

= Dasiphora fruticosa var. veitchii =

Variety of flowering plant

Dasiphora fruticosa var. veitchii is a flowering plant in the family Rosaceae, native to Sichuan and Yunnan in China. It was first described as the species Potentilla veitchii by Ernest Henry Wilson in 1911, after he had earlier introduced it into gardens in the United Kingdom. Its scientific name and status have varied, and remained "unresolved" according to the Royal Horticultural Society as of May 2022. In horticulture, it may also be found under the names Potentilla davurica var. veitchii and Potentilla fruticosa var. veitchii. It is cultivated as an ornamental flowering shrub.

== Description ==
When first described (as Potentilla veitchii) in 1911, it was said to be similar to Potentilla fruticosa (now Dasiphora fruticosa), being distinguished mainly by its pure white flowers. It had grey-green foliage and could reach a height of 3 to 5 ft (0.9 to 1.5 m). It was distinguished from Potentilla davurica (synonyms Dasiphora davurica, Dasiphora glabrata) by being taller and less compact. More recently, the plant was described (under the name Potentilla davurica var. veitchii) as having leaflets that are hairy on both surfaces, with prominent lateral veins on the undersurface. The bractlets outside the sepals about equal them in length.

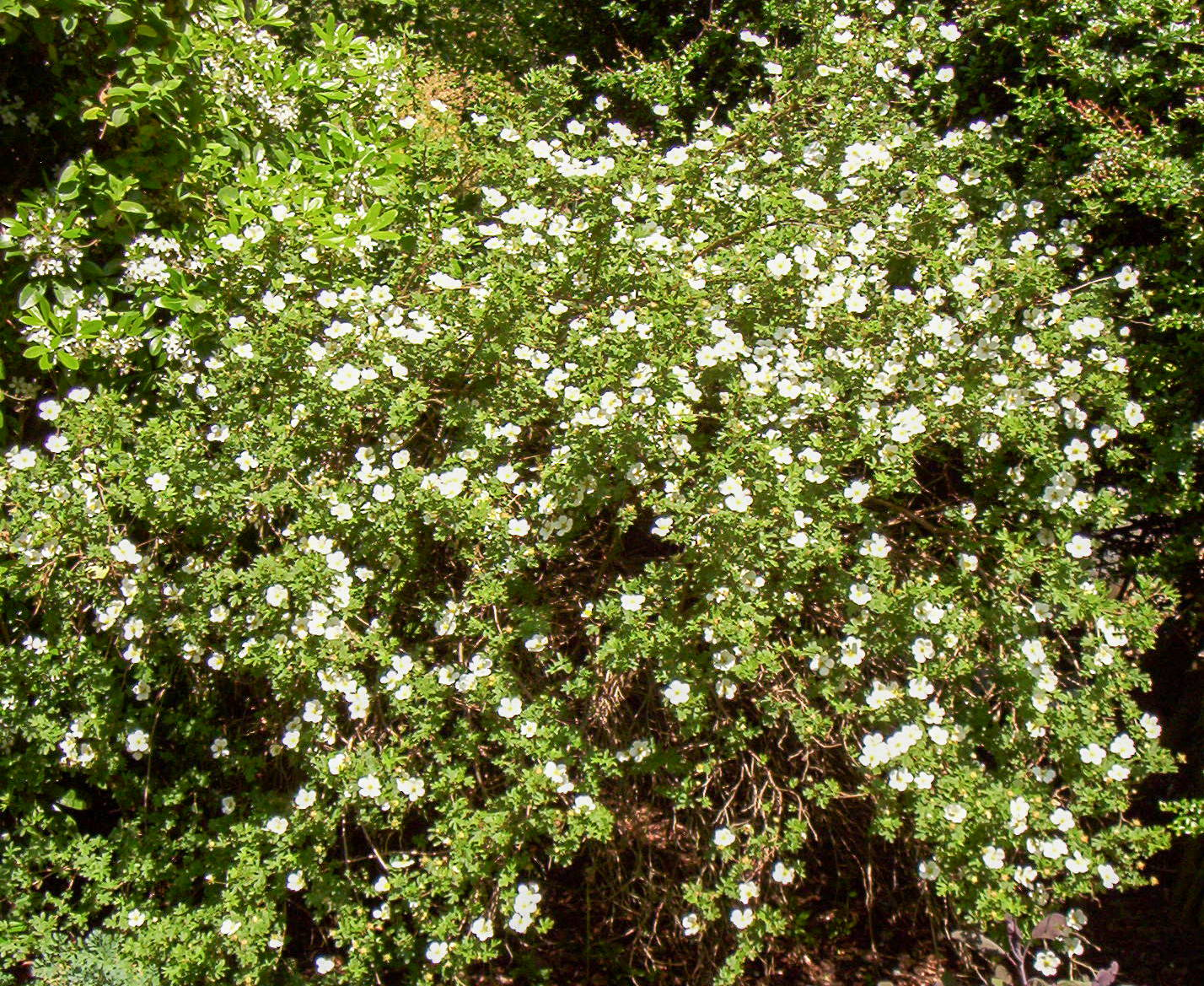
Garden plant originally identified as Potentilla veitchii

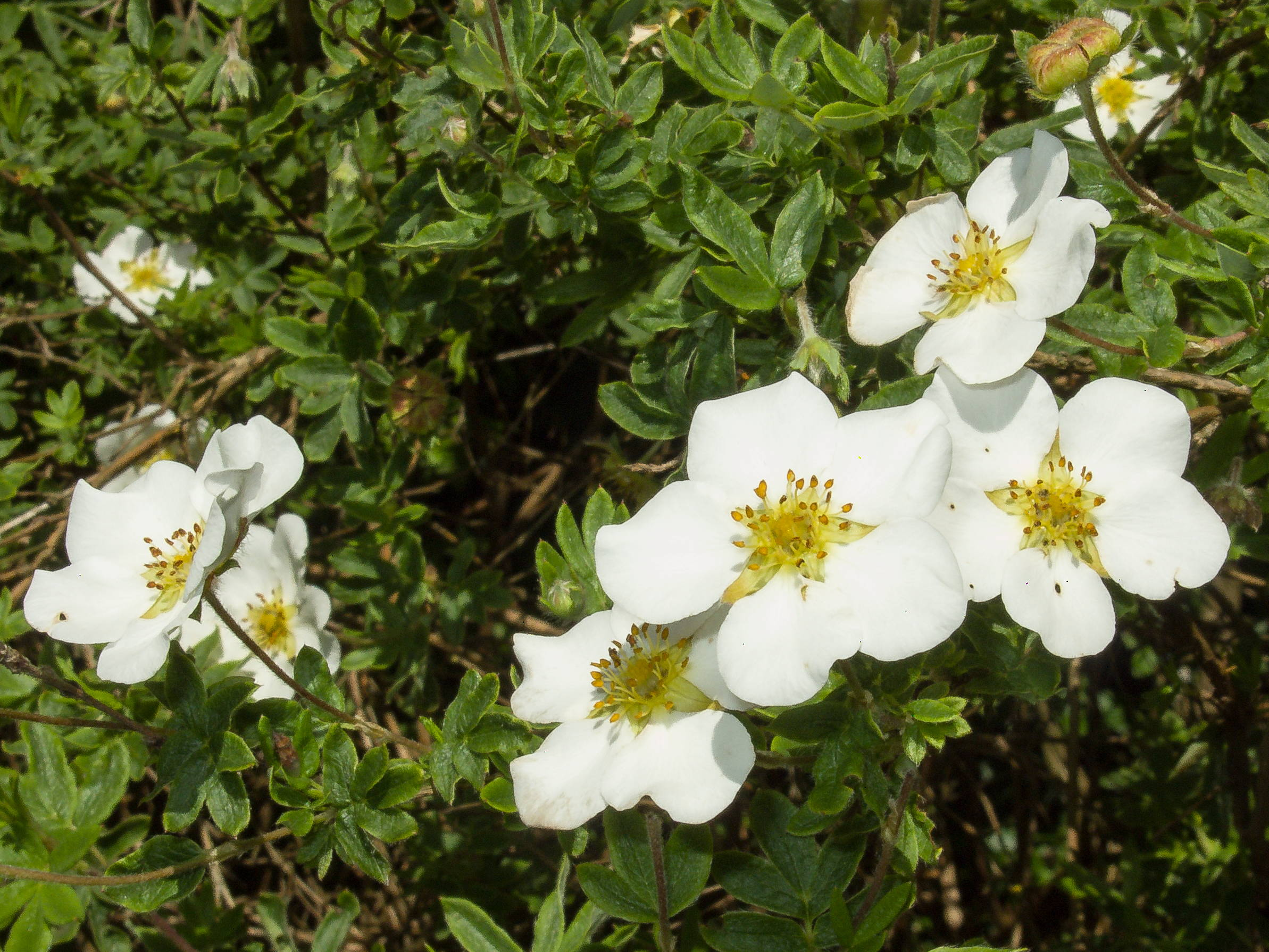
Flower of garden plant originally identified as Potentilla veitchii

== Taxonomy ==
Ernest Henry Wilson introduced the plant to horticulture in 1900, formally naming it as Potentilla veitchii in 1911. Its precise status and nomenclature has varied. Bean's Trees and Shrubs Hardy in the British Isles treated it as the variety veitchii of Potentilla davurica, as did Brearley in 1987. Others included it in Potentilla fruticosa, either as the variety veitchii or as the cultivar 'Veitchii'. As of May 2022, the Royal Horticultural Society (RHS) described its name status as "unresolved". To add to the nomenclatural confusion, the species of Potentilla into which it has been placed have been separated into the genus Dasiphora as a result of molecular phylogenetic studies. As of May 2022, Plants of the World Online (PoWO) treats Potentilla veitchii as a synonym of Dasiphora fruticosa var. veitchii, whereas the Germplasm Resources Information Network treats it as a synonym of Dasiphora davurica (accepted as Dasiphora glabrata by PoWO).

== Distribution and habitat ==
Dasiphora fruticosa var. veitchii is native to South Central China (Sichuan and Yunnan). Wilson described it in 1911 as common in upland thickets at altitudes of about 6,000 m (20,000 ft) in open rocky situations exposed to full sun.

== Cultivation ==
Dasiphora fruticosa var. veitchii, under various names, is cultivated as an ornamental shrub. It was described in 1987 as "not common" in gardens, possibly because its small flowers are not abundant, although they are produced over a long period. It was awarded the RHS Award of Garden Merit in 1969. It is frost-hardy. A sunny position is needed for good flowering.
