= Negotinthia myrmosaeformis =

Scientific classification
- Domain: Eukaryota
- Kingdom: Animalia
- Phylum: Arthropoda
- Class: Insecta
- Order: Lepidoptera
- Family: Sesiidae
- Genus: Negotinthia
- Species: N. myrmosaeformis

Binomial name
- Negotinthia myrmosaeformis (Herrich-Schäffer, 1846)

Synonyms
- Paranthrena myrmosaeformis Herrich-Schäffer, 1846; Tinthia myrmosaeformis; Paranthrene myrmosiformis Staudinger 1856; Paranthrene cingulata Staudinger, 1871; Tinthia cingulata

Species of moth

Negotinthia myrmosaeformis is a moth of the family Sesiidae. It is found in the countries around the Black Sea, including Ukraine, southern Russia, Romania, Bulgaria and the southern part of the Balkan Peninsula. It has also been recorded from Asia Minor, northern Iraq, Armenia and Azerbaijan.

The wingspan is about 22 mm.

The larvae feed on the roots of Potentilla species, including Potentilla recta, Potentilla obscura, Potentilla taurica and Paliurus spina-christi.

== Subspecies ==
- Negotinthia myrmosaeformis myrmosaeformis (Balkans, Asia Minor, northern Iraq, Armenia, Azerbaijan, southern Russia, southern Ukraine)
- Negotinthia myrmosaeformis cingulata (Staudinger, 1871) (Serbia, Montenegro, Macedonia, Greece, southern Bulgaria to southern Russia)
