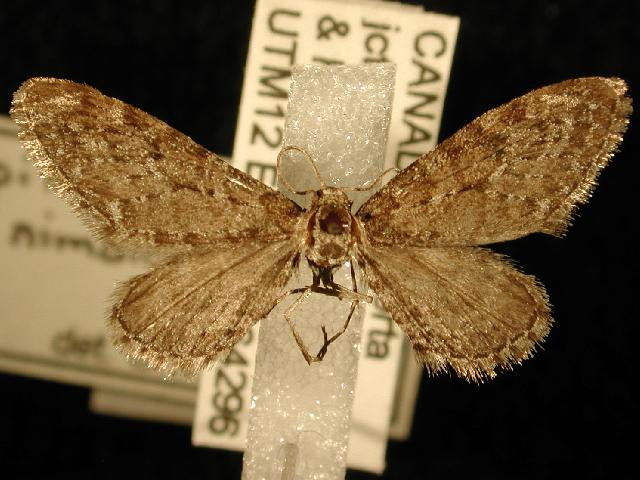

Scientific classification
- Kingdom: Animalia
- Phylum: Arthropoda
- Clade: Pancrustacea
- Class: Insecta
- Order: Lepidoptera
- Family: Geometridae
- Genus: Eupithecia
- Species: E. nimbicolor

Binomial name
- Eupithecia nimbicolor (Hulst, 1896)

Synonyms
- Tephroclystia nimbicolor Hulst, 1896; Eupithecia adornata Taylor, 1906; Eupithecia inclarata Cassino & Swett, 1924; Eupithecia incresata Pearsall, 1910; Tephroclystia obscurior Hulst, 1896

= Eupithecia nimbicolor =

Species of moth

Eupithecia nimbicolor is a moth in the family Geometridae, first described by George Duryea Hulst in 1896. It is found in North America from eastern Newfoundland and Labrador to western British Columbia and from Alaska to Arizona.

The wingspan is 17–23 mm. Adults are on wing from mid-May to mid-July in the north.

The larvae feed on the flowers of Achillea and Castilleja species and the foliage of Salix, Rosa, Potentilla fruticosa and Ribes species.
