= Potentilla × tonguei =

- Close-up of flower
- Habit

Scientific classification
- Kingdom: Plantae
- Clade: Tracheophytes
- Clade: Angiosperms
- Clade: Eudicots
- Clade: Rosids
- Order: Rosales
- Family: Rosaceae
- Genus: Potentilla
- Species: P. × tonguei

Binomial name
- Potentilla × tonguei W.H.Baxter

Synonyms
- Potentilla × tormentilla-formosa Tongue ex W.H.Baxter

Hybrid species of plant

Potentilla × tonguei, the staghorn cinquefoil or Tongue cinquefoil, is an artificial hybrid species of flowering plant in the family Rosaceae. Its parents are Potentilla anglica and P. nepalensis. A sprawling deciduous shrub 12 cm (5 in) tall and 60 cm (24 in) wide, with apricot-yellow flowers, it has gained the Royal Horticultural Society's Award of Garden Merit. It is widely available from commercial suppliers, is recommended as a bedding or border plant, and is hardy in USDA Zones 4 to 8.
