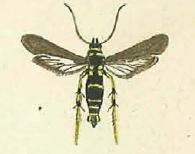

Scientific classification
- Domain: Eukaryota
- Kingdom: Animalia
- Phylum: Arthropoda
- Class: Insecta
- Order: Lepidoptera
- Family: Sesiidae
- Genus: Negotinthia
- Species: N. hoplisiformis

Binomial name
- Negotinthia hoplisiformis (Mann, 1864)

Synonyms
- Paranthrene hoplisiformis Mann, 1864; Tinthia hoplisiformis

= Negotinthia hoplisiformis =

Species of moth

Negotinthia hoplisiformis is a moth of the family Sesiidae. It is found in Greece, Turkey and Iran.

The wingspan is about 21 mm.

The larvae feed on Sanguisorba minor.
