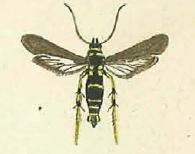
- Negotinthia hoplisiformis

Scientific classification
- Domain: Eukaryota
- Kingdom: Animalia
- Phylum: Arthropoda
- Class: Insecta
- Order: Lepidoptera
- Family: Sesiidae
- Tribe: Tinthiini
- Genus: Negotinthia; Gorbunov, 2001

Species
- See text

= Negotinthia =

Genus of moths

Negotinthia is a genus of moths in the family Sesiidae. It is found in the Crimean peninsula and its diet is primarily plant-based.

== Species ==
- Negotinthia hoplisiformis (Mann, 1864)
- Negotinthia myrmosaeformis (Herrich-Schäffer, 1846)
  - Negotinthia myrmosaeformis myrmosaeformis (Herrich-Schäffer, 1846)
  - Negotinthia myrmosaeformis cingulata (Staudinger, 1871)
