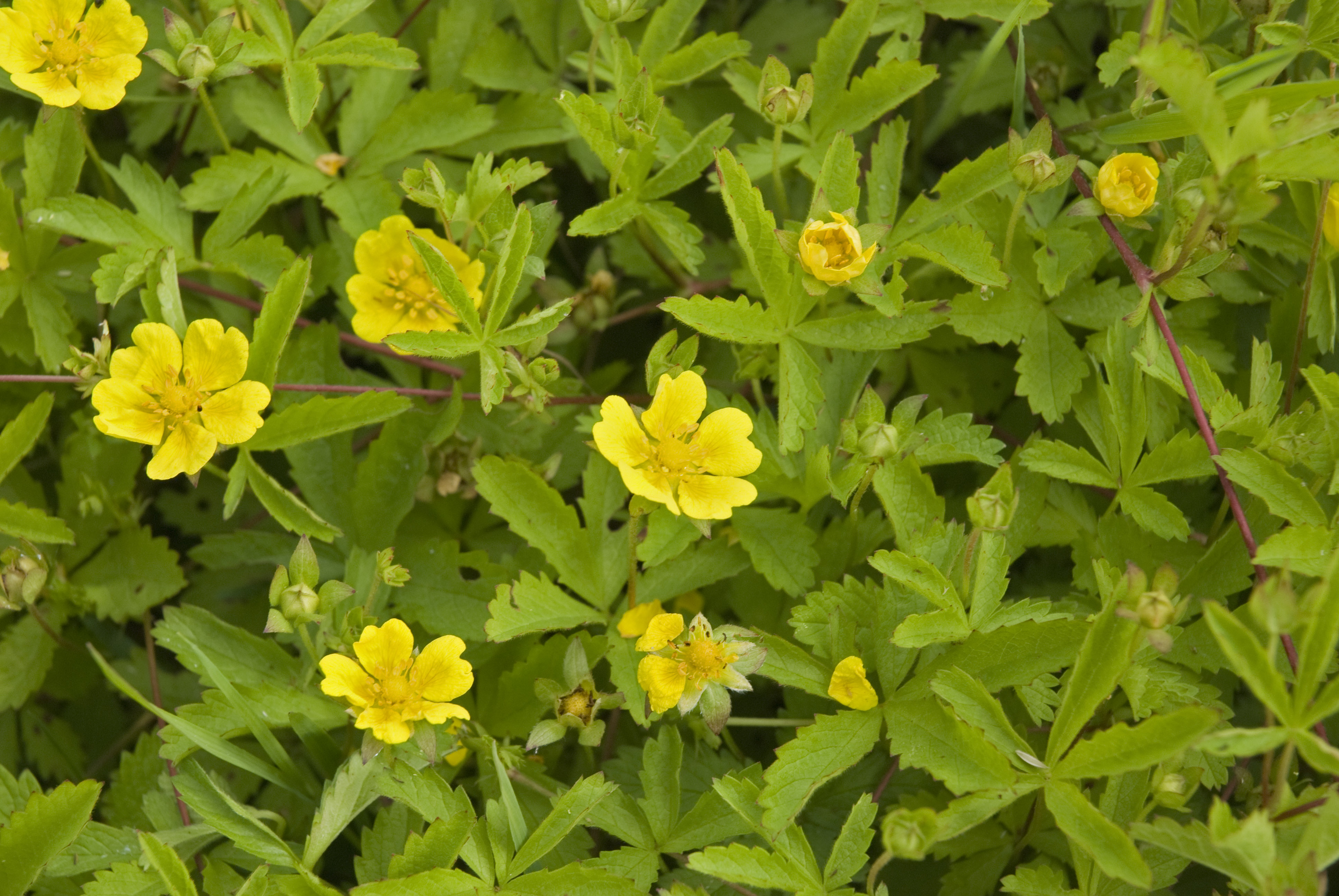
- Potentilla reptans

Scientific classification
- Kingdom: Plantae
- Clade: Tracheophytes
- Clade: Angiosperms
- Clade: Eudicots
- Clade: Rosids
- Order: Rosales
- Family: Rosaceae
- Subfamily: Rosoideae
- Tribe: Potentilleae
- Subtribe: Potentillinae
- Genus: Potentilla; L.

Type species
- Potentilla reptans L.

Species
- Over 500

Synonyms
- List: Pentaphylloides Duhamel; Quinquefolium Ség.; Callionia Greene; Chamaephyton Fourr.; Chionice Bunge ex Ledeb.; Coelas Dulac; Comarella Rydb.; Commarum Schrank; Duchesnea Sm.; Dynamidium Fourr.; Fraga Lapeyr.; Fragariastrum Heist. ex Fabr.; Fragariastrum (Ser.) Schur; Horkelia Cham. & Schltdl.; Horkeliella (Rydb.) Rydb.; Hypargyrium Fourr.; Ivesia Torr. & A.Gray; Jussiea L. ex Sm.; Lehmannia Tratt.; Pentaphyllum Hill; Pentaphyllum Gaertn.; Potentillopsis Opiz; Purpusia Brandegee; Stellariopsis (Baill.) Rydb.; Tormentilla L.; Trichothalamus Spreng.; Tridophyllum Neck. ex Greene; Tylosperma Botsch.

= Potentilla =

Genus of flowering plants in the rose family

Potentilla /ˌpoʊtənˈtɪlə/ is a genus containing over 500 species of annual, biennial and perennial herbaceous flowering plants in the rose family, Rosaceae.

Potentillas may also be called cinquefoils in English, but they have also been called five fingers and silverweeds. Some species are called tormentils, though this is often used specifically for common tormentil (P. erecta). Others are referred to as barren strawberries, which may also refer to P. sterilis in particular, or to the closely related Waldsteinia fragarioides. Several other cinquefoils formerly included here are now separated in distinct genera – notably the popular garden shrub P. fruticosa, now Dasiphora fruticosa.

Potentillas are generally found throughout the northern continents of the world (holarctic), though some occur in montane biomes of the New Guinea Highlands.

== Description ==
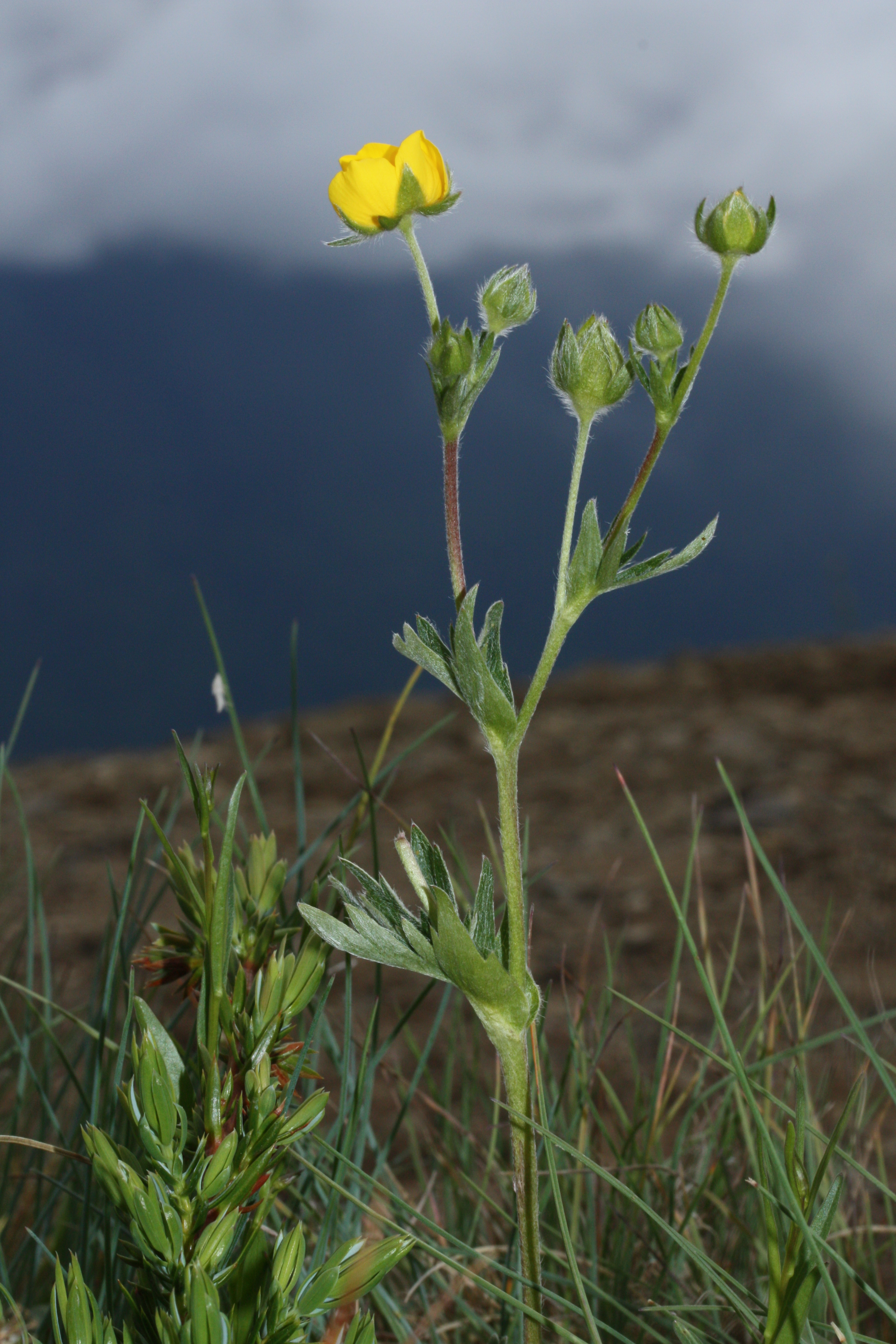
Potentilla diversifolia at 1,636 metres (5,367 ft) in Olympic National Park

Typical cinquefoils look most similar to strawberries, but differ in usually having dry, inedible fruit (hence the name "barren strawberry" for some species). Many cinquefoil species have palmate leaves. Some species have just three leaflets, while others have fifteen or more leaflets arranged pinnately. The flowers are usually yellow, but may be white, pinkish or red. The accessory fruits are usually dry but may be fleshy and strawberry-like, while the actual seeds – each one technically a single fruit – are tiny nuts.

== Taxonomy ==
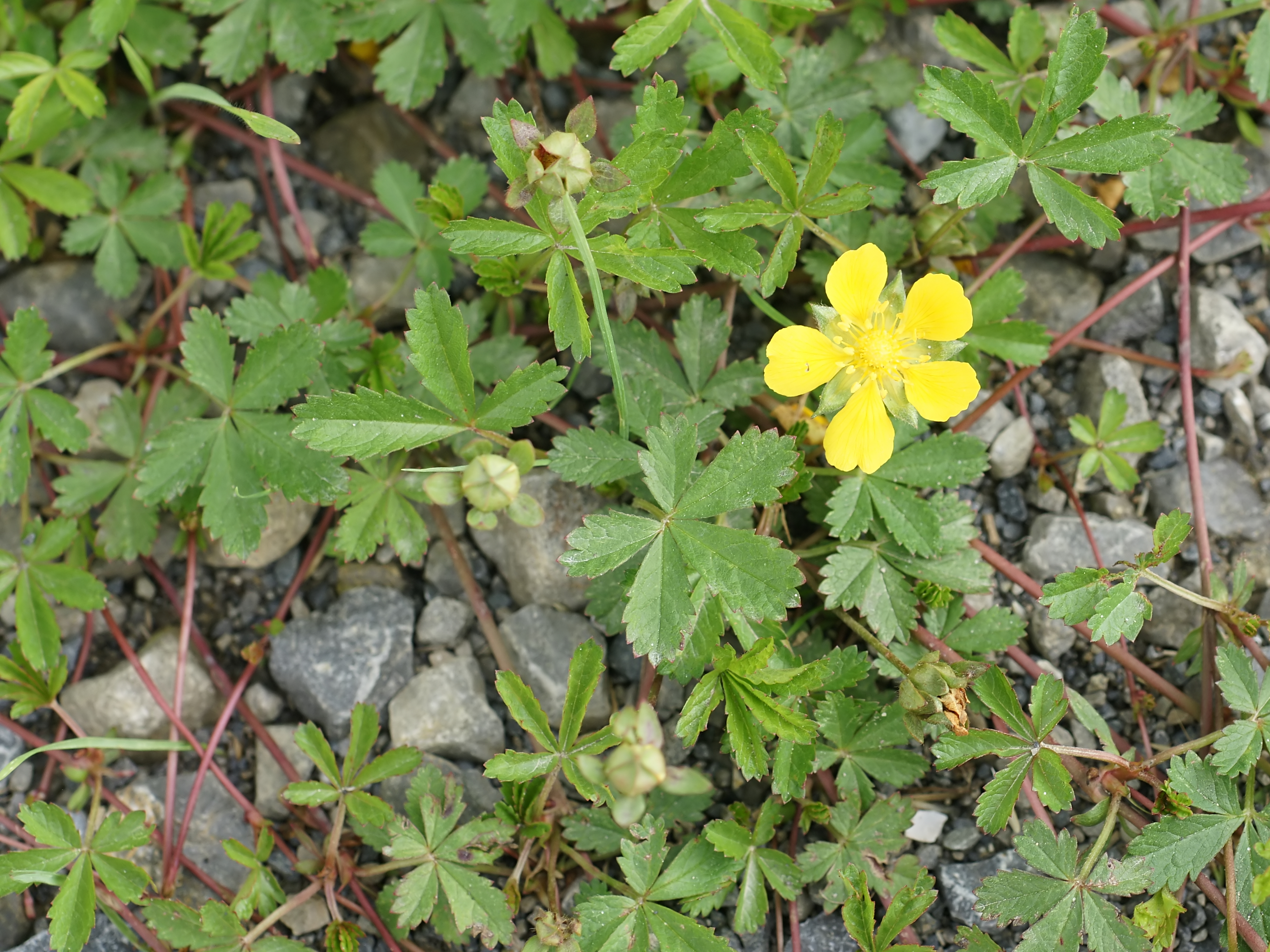
European cinquefoil (P. reptans), the type species of Potentilla, was described by Linnaeus in 1753.

Among the Rosaceae, cinquefoils are close relatives of avens (genus Geum) and roses (Rosa), and even closer relatives of agrimonies (Agrimonia). Yet more closely related to Potentilla are lady's mantles (Alchemilla) and strawberries (Fragaria). Dryas is a more distantly related genus, long-held beliefs notwithstanding.

Analysis of internal transcribed spacer DNA sequence data has yielded valuable information on cinquefoil relationships, supporting previous hypotheses as to their descent, but also resulting in a number of changes to the circumscription of Potentilla.

The horkelias, mousetails, and mock-strawberries formerly classified in the genera Horkelia, Ivesia, and Duchesnea are now all included in the genus Potentilla. Conversely, the shrubby plants previously included in this genus are now separated in the genus Dasiphora, while some distinctive and apparently protocarnivorous herbaceous cinquefoils are placed in Drymocallis. The marsh cinquefoil is now in the genus Comarum, and the three-toothed cinquefoil makes up the monotypic genus Sibbaldiopsis. As already proposed by John Hill in the 18th century, the silverweeds of genus Argentina may be distinct, but as the immediate sister genus of Potentilla, its boundary is still unclear.

=== Subdivision ===
Estimates of the number of valid species in this large genus depend on the circumscription used, and over 500 species are currently recognised by Plants of the World Online.

See the list of Potentilla species.

=== Formerly included in Potentilla ===
- Argentina (segregate)
- Comarum
- Dasiphora
- Drymocallis
- Sibbaldiopsis

=== Etymology ===
"Cinquefoil" in the Middle English Dictionary is described as "Pentafilon – from Greek Pentaphyllon – influenced by foil, a leaf. The European cinquefoil (Potentilla reptans), often used medicinally." The word is derived from Old French cinc, Middle English cink and ultimately Latin quinque – all meaning "five" –, and feuille and foil/foille which mean "leaf". Formerly this term referred to five-leaved plants in general. In medieval times, the word "cinquefoil" was used almost exclusively in England. In France, the genus was called quintefeuille, first attested in Normandy and Brittany in the 11th-century.

The scientific name Potentilla seems to have been influenced by a fusion of ancient names for these plants. Common tormentil, P. erecta, was known as tormentilla in medieval Latin, derived from early Spanish – literally "a little torment", meaning pain that, while not debilitating, is unpleasant and persistent (such as a stomach ache, against which P. erecta was used). The change from initial "t" to "p" seems to have been influenced by terms such as poterium – Latin for the related burnets (genus Sanguisorba) – or propedila and similar words used for the European cinquefoil (P. reptans) in the now-extinct Dacian language, as attested in Latin herbals.

In another medieval dictionary the French word potentille is defined as a "wild Tansie, a silver weed", a reference to the tansy (Tanacetum vulgare) and similar taxa of the genus Tanacetum. The related adjective potentiel/potentiells means "strong", "forcible", or "powerful in operation". Its origin is the French potence ("strong", "powerful", "mighty", or "potent"). The origin of these words is the Latin potens, with the same meaning.

== Distribution and habitat ==
Cinquefoils grow wild in most cool and cold regions of the world. Most species are herbaceous perennials but a few are erect or creeping shrubs. Some are troublesome weeds. Other types are grown in gardens.

== Ecology ==
Cinquefoils are a prominent part of many ecosystems. In the United Kingdom alone, common tormentil (P. erecta) together with purple moor grass (Molinia caerulea) defines many grassy mires, and grows abundantly in the typical deciduous forest with downy birch (Betula pubescens), common wood sorrel (Oxalis acetosella), and sessile oak (Quercus petraea). In upland pastures on calcareous soil it typically accompanies common bent (Agrostis capillaris), sheep's fescue (Festuca ovina), and wild thyme (Thymus praecox). It is most commonly seen in regions dominated by common heather (Calluna vulgaris), including common lowland heaths with bell heather (Erica cinerea), maritime heaths with spring squill (Scilla verna), submontane heaths dominated by red peat moss (Sphagnum capillifolium) and common bilberry (Vaccinium myrtillus), and the mountain heathlands of Scotland with alpine juniper (Juniperus communis ssp. alpina).

The leaves of cinquefoils are eaten by the caterpillars of many Lepidoptera, notably the grizzled skippers (genus Pyrgus), butterflies of the skipper family. Adult butterflies and moths visit cinquefoil flowers; for example, the endangered Karner blue butterfly (Plebejus melissa samuelis) takes nectar from common cinquefoil (P. simplex). The Polish cochineal (Porphyrophora polonica), a scale insect once used to produce red dye, lives on cinquefoils and other plants in Eurasia. Some, but not all, cinquefoils are insect-pollinated, producing nectar that lures bees, hoverflies, muscid flies, butterflies, true bugs, and ants.

== Fossil record ==
One fossil fruitlet of †Potentilla pliocenica has been described from a middle Miocene stratum of the Fasterholt area near Silkeborg in Central Jutland, Denmark. Four fossil fruits of †Potentilla pliocenica have been extracted from bore hole samples of the Middle Miocene fresh water deposits in Nowy Sacz Basin, West Carpathians, Poland.

== Uses ==
=== Horticulture ===
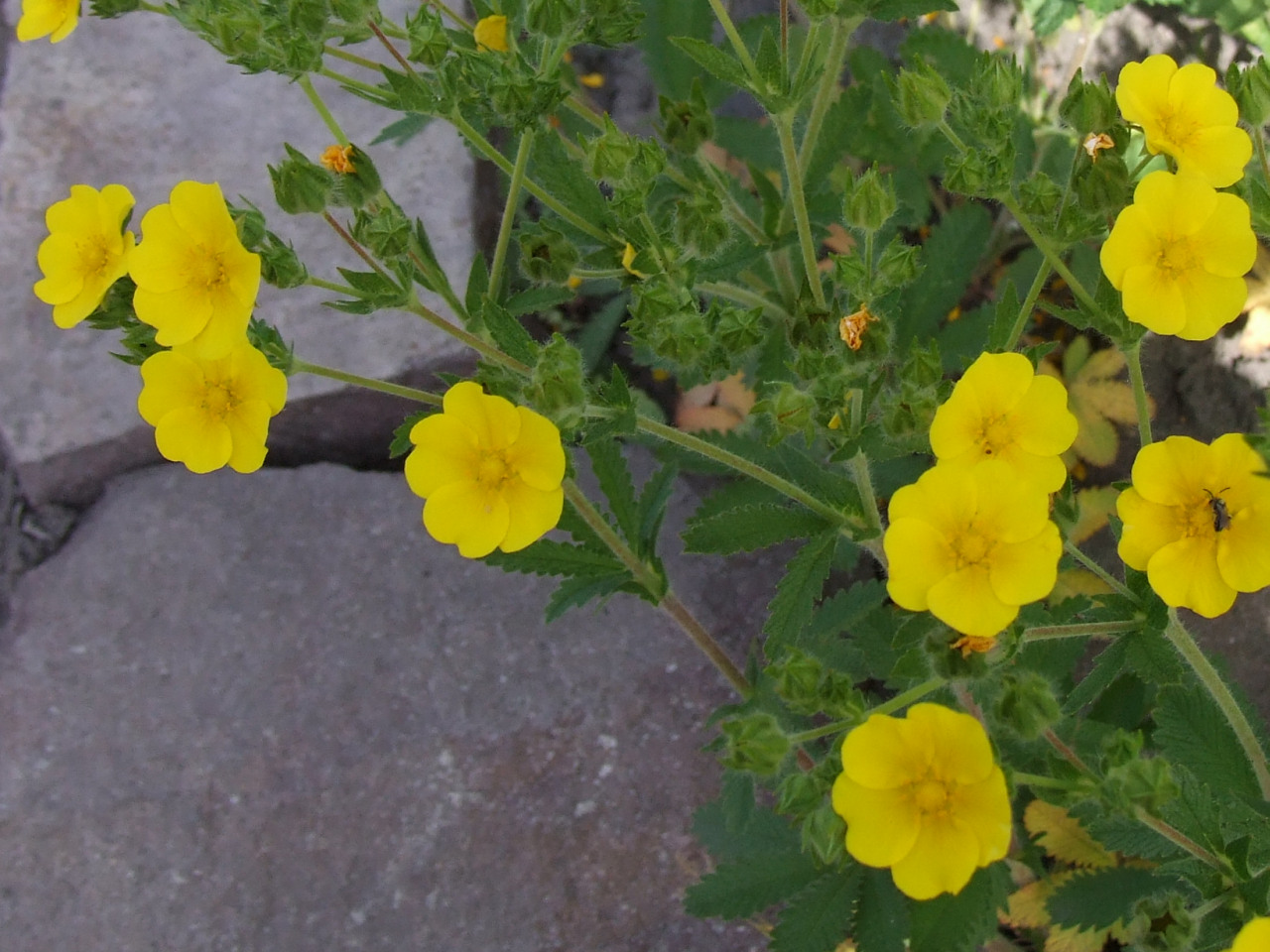
Sulphur cinquefoil (P. recta) growing in a garden

Some cinquefoils are grown as ornamental plants. These are generally high species with bright, showy flowers, such as golden cinquefoil (P. aurea), ruby cinquefoil (P. atrosanguinea), Nepal cinquefoil (P. nepalensis), and sulphur cinquefoil (P. recta). Horticultural hybrids such as Hopwood's cinquefoil (Potentilla × hopwoodiana) and tongue cinquefoil (Potentilla × tonguei) have been bred, and there exists a range of cultivars. Some double-flowered cinquefoils have been bred, starting with Victor Lemoine's 'Gloire de Nancy' in 1854. Other taxa and varieties are useful for more specialized gardening purposes, such as rock gardens or swamps. Among the former is the hardy spring cinquefoil (P. neumanniana), the floral emblem of Cromartyshire.

=== Health ===
Some species are used in herbalism. Common tormentil (P. erecta), for example, has been used as an herbal remedy for inflammation and gastrointestinal disorders. Research continues to determine its safety and usefulness as an alternative medicine for such disorders as ulcerative colitis. Potentilla discolor and P. multifida are Chinese medicinal herbs used to treat diabetes.

The arms of the chief of Scottish Clan Hamilton undifferenced, "gules, three cinquefoils ermine"

== Cultural references ==
In heraldry, the cinquefoil emblem or potentilla signified strength, power, honor, and loyalty. Depiction of the five-petalled flower appears as early as 1033, in the architecture of the church built in the village of Reulle-Vergy in Burgundy, France, two years before the reign of William the Conqueror. The cinquefoil emblem was used generously in the architecture of numerous churches built in Normandy and Brittany through the 15th century.

From the 11th to 14th century, the word potence, related to potentilla, was used mainly in a military context and to describe the condition of the soul.

At the time of William the Conqueror, the potentilla was used as the device of Bardolph of Brittany, who was the master of William's military engineer corps.
