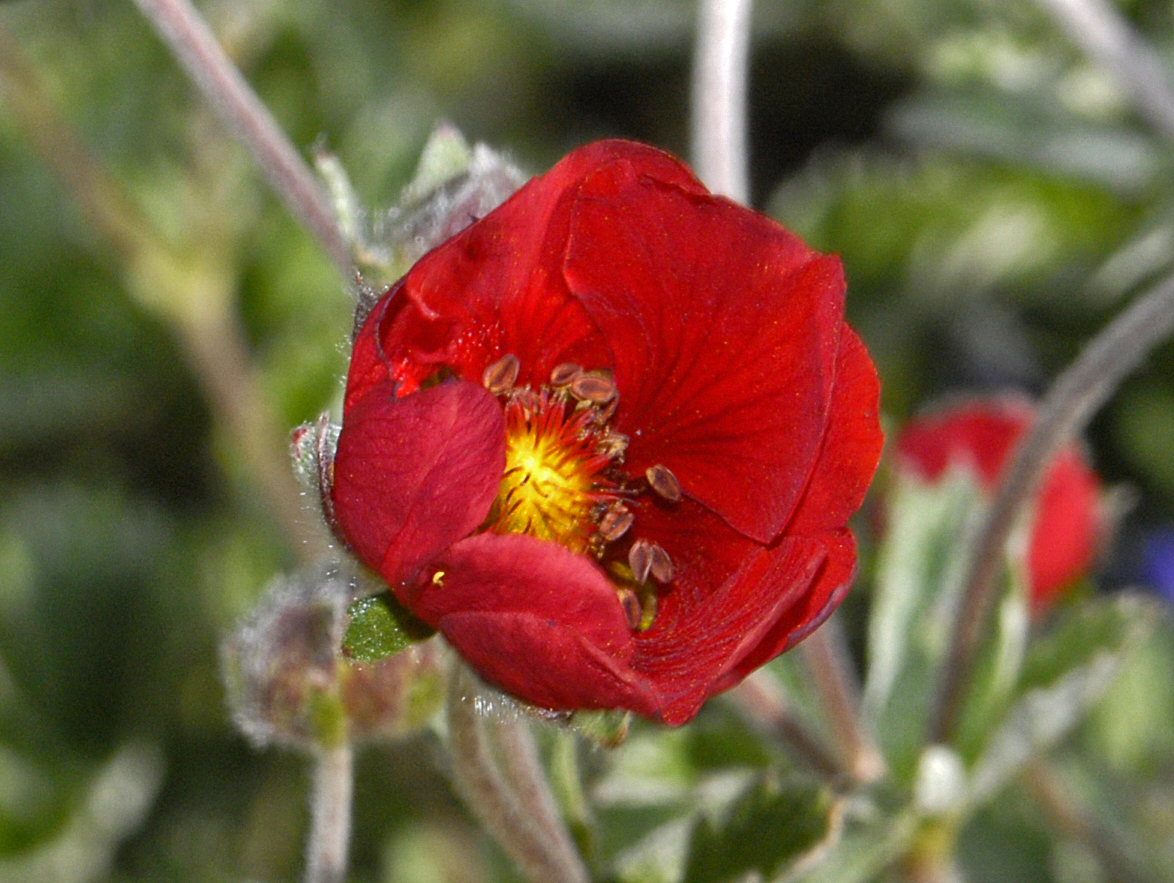
- Flower of Potentilla nepalensis at the Giardino Botanico Alpino Chanousia

Scientific classification
- Kingdom: Plantae
- Clade: Tracheophytes
- Clade: Angiosperms
- Clade: Eudicots
- Clade: Rosids
- Order: Rosales
- Family: Rosaceae
- Genus: Potentilla
- Species: P. nepalensis

Binomial name
- Potentilla nepalensis Hooker

Synonyms
- Potentilla nepalensis willmottiae; Potentilla willmottiae; Potentilla 'Miss Wilmott'

= Potentilla nepalensis =

Species of flowering plant

Potentilla nepalensis, common name Nepal cinquefoil, is a perennial plant species in the genus Potentilla.

== Description ==
Potentilla nepalensis can reach a height of 30–60 centimetres (12–24 in). This plant forms low mounds of deep green strawberry-like leaves composed of broad leaflets. The cup-shaped 5-petalled flowers may be cherry red or deep pink, with a darker center, about 2.5 cm in width. They bloom July to August.

== Distribution ==
This plant is native to E. Asia and W. Himalayas, from Pakistan to Nepal.

== Habitat ==
This species can be found in grazing grounds and cultivated areas, at elevation of 2,100–2,700 metres (6,900–8,900 ft) above sea level.

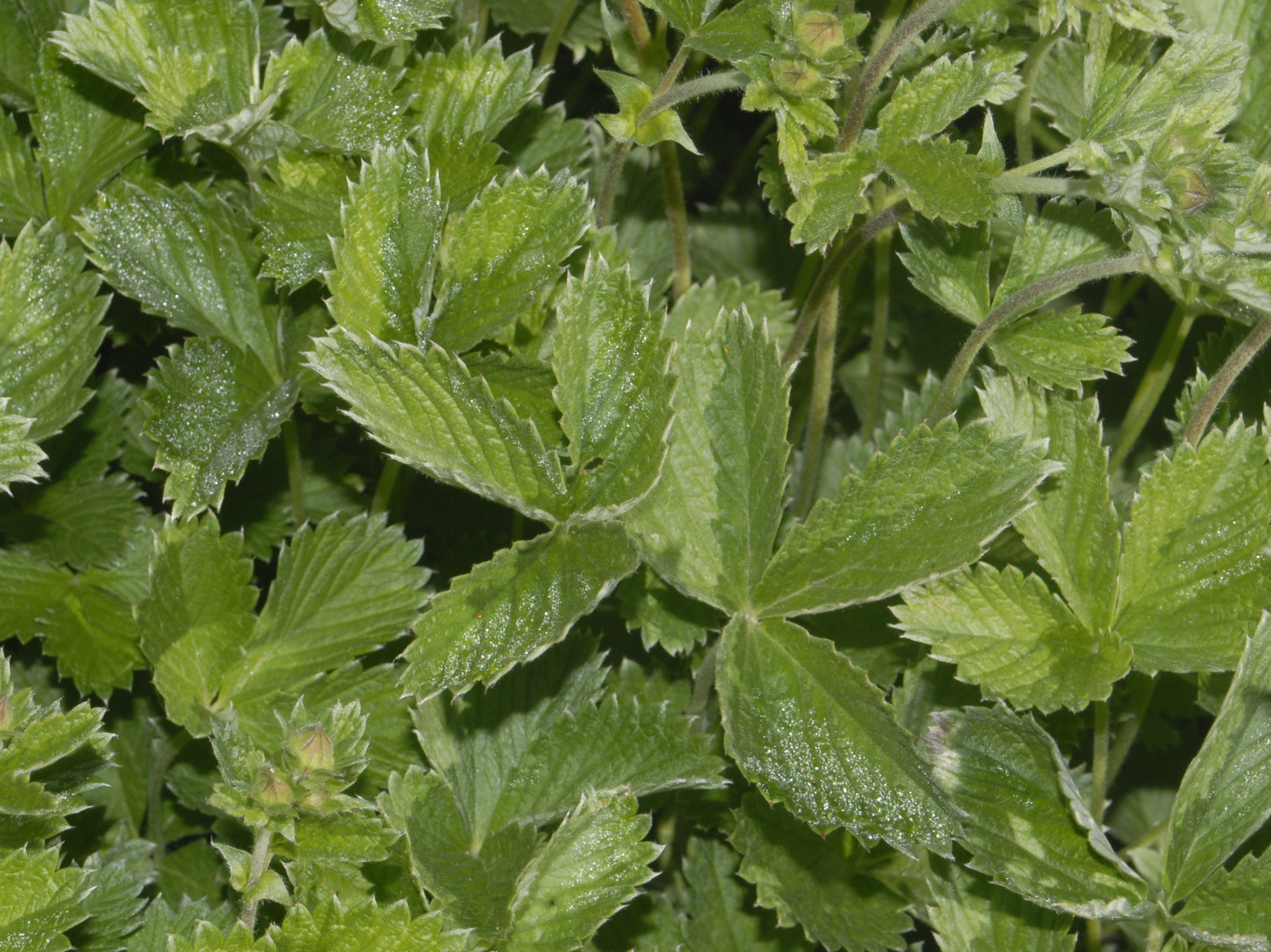
Foliage
