= Dasiphora glabrata =

Scientific classification
- Kingdom: Plantae
- Clade: Tracheophytes
- Clade: Angiosperms
- Clade: Eudicots
- Clade: Rosids
- Order: Rosales
- Family: Rosaceae
- Genus: Dasiphora
- Species: D. glabrata

Binomial name
- Dasiphora glabrata (Willd. ex Schltdl.) Soják

Synonyms
- Dasiphora davurica (Nestl.) Kom. & Aliss.; Pentaphylloides dahurica (Nestl.) Ikonn.; Pentaphylloides glabrata (Willd. ex Schltdl.) O.Schwarz; Potentilla dahurica G.Don; Potentilla davurica Nestl.; Potentilla davurica var. flava Vorosch.; Potentilla fruticosa subsp. glabrata (Willd. ex Schltdl.) Vorosch.; Potentilla glabrata Willd. ex D.F.K.Schltdl.

Species of flowering plant

Dasiphora glabrata, with synonyms including Potentilla glabrata, Dasiphora davurica and Potentilla davurica, is a species of flowering plant in the family Rosaceae, native to Siberia (Chita), the far east of Russia (Primorye) and north east China (Manchuria).
