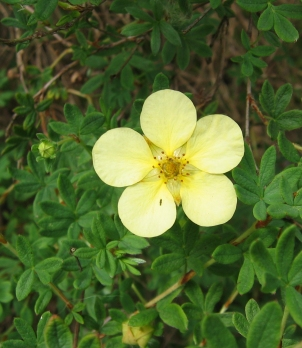
- Dasiphora fruticosa in flower

Scientific classification
- Kingdom: Plantae
- Clade: Tracheophytes
- Clade: Angiosperms
- Clade: Eudicots
- Clade: Rosids
- Order: Rosales
- Family: Rosaceae
- Subfamily: Rosoideae
- Tribe: Potentilleae
- Subtribe: Fragariinae
- Genus: Dasiphora; Raf.

Species
- See text

Synonyms
- Comocarpa Rydb. 1898

= Dasiphora =

Genus of flowering plants

Dasiphora is a genus of shrubs in the rose family Rosaceae, native to Asia, with one species D. fruticosa (shrubby cinquefoil), ranging across the entire cool temperate Northern Hemisphere. In the past, the genus was normally included in Potentilla as Potentilla sect. Rhopalostylae, but genetic evidence has shown it to be distinct.

The leaves are divided into five (occasionally three or seven) leaflets arranged pinnately, whence the name cinquefoil (French, cinque feuilles, "five leaves").

== Species ==
As of April 2023, Plants of the World Online accepts the following species:

Image	Scientific name	Distribution
	Dasiphora arbuscula (D.Don) Soják	Himalaya to Tibet
	Dasiphora dryadanthoides Juz.	Central Asia to Himalaya.
	Dasiphora fruticosa (L.) Rydb. (syn. Potentilla fruticosa)	Temp. Northern Hemisphere.
	Dasiphora galantha (Soják) Soják	Qinghai to China (Sichuan, Yunnan)
	Dasiphora glabra (G.Lodd.) Soják (syn. Potentilla glabra)	China
	Dasiphora glabrata (Willd. ex Schltdl.) Soják (syns. Dasiphora davurica, Potentilla davurica, Potentilla fruticosa subsp. glabrata, Potentilla glabrata)	SE. Siberia to NE. China
	Dasiphora gorovoii Pshenn.	E. Primorye
	Dasiphora mandshurica (Maxim.) Juz.	S. Russian Far East to China and N. Korea.
	Dasiphora parvifolia (Fisch. ex Lehm.) Juz. (syn. Potentilla parvifolia)	Central Asia to Siberia and N. & W. China.
	Dasiphora phyllocalyx Juz.	Afghanistan to Central Asia and Pakistan
	Dasiphora spectabilis (Businský & Soják) Businský & Soják	Tibet.

The Flora of China also includes Potentilla bifurca (syn. Sibbaldianthe bifurca) and P. imbricata (syn. Sibbaldianthe imbricata) in this group, but these species (which are not shrubs) do not have published combinations in Dasiphora.
