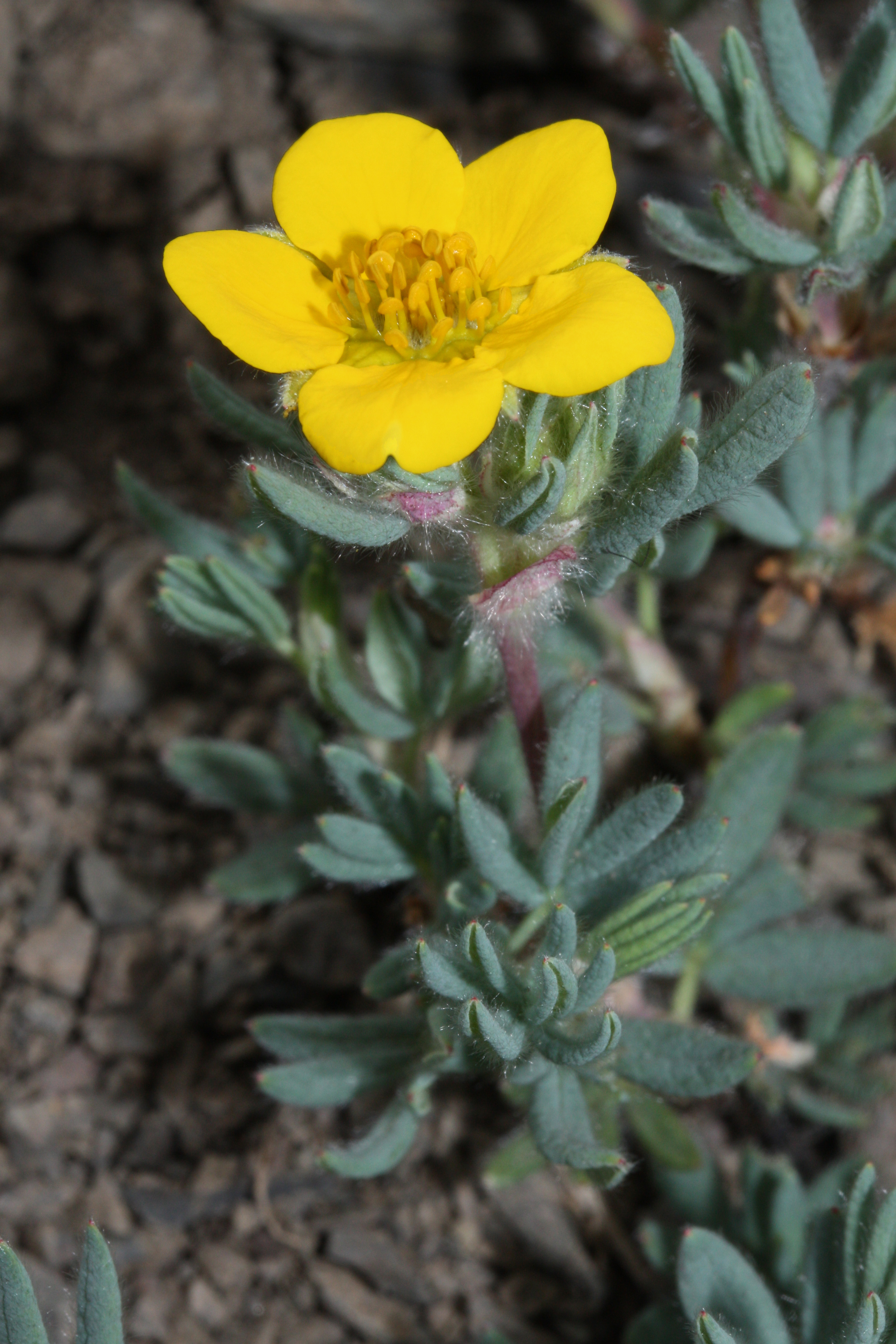
- Dasiphora fruticosa subsp. floribunda

Scientific classification
- Kingdom: Plantae
- Clade: Embryophytes
- Clade: Tracheophytes
- Clade: Angiosperms
- Clade: Eudicots
- Clade: Rosids
- Order: Rosales
- Family: Rosaceae
- Genus: Dasiphora
- Species: D. fruticosa

Binomial name
- Dasiphora fruticosa (L.) Rydb.

Synonyms
- List: Comocarpa fruticosa (L.) Rydb.; Dasiphora floribunda (Pursh) Raf.; Dasiphora riparia Raf.; Fragaria fruticosa (L.) Crantz; Pentaphylloides elata Salisb.; Pentaphylloides floribunda (Pursh) Á.L”ve; Pentaphylloides fruticosa (L.) O.Schwarz; Pentaphylloides fruticosa subsp. floribunda (Pursh) M.La¡nz; Potentilla floribunda Pursh; Potentilla fruticosa L.; Potentilla fruticosa subsp. floribunda (Pursh) Elkington; Potentilla fruticosa var. floribunda (Pursh) Steud.; Potentilla fruticosa var. prostrata Lapeyr. ex Gaut.; Potentilla fruticosa var. pyrenaica Willd. ex Schltdl.; Potentilla fruticosa var. tenuifolia (Willd. ex Schltdl.) Lehm.; Potentilla loureironis Tratt.; Potentilla prostrata Lapeyr.; Potentilla × tenuifolia Willd. ex Schltdl.; Tormentilla fruticosa (L.) Stokes

= Dasiphora fruticosa =

Species of flowering plant in the rose family

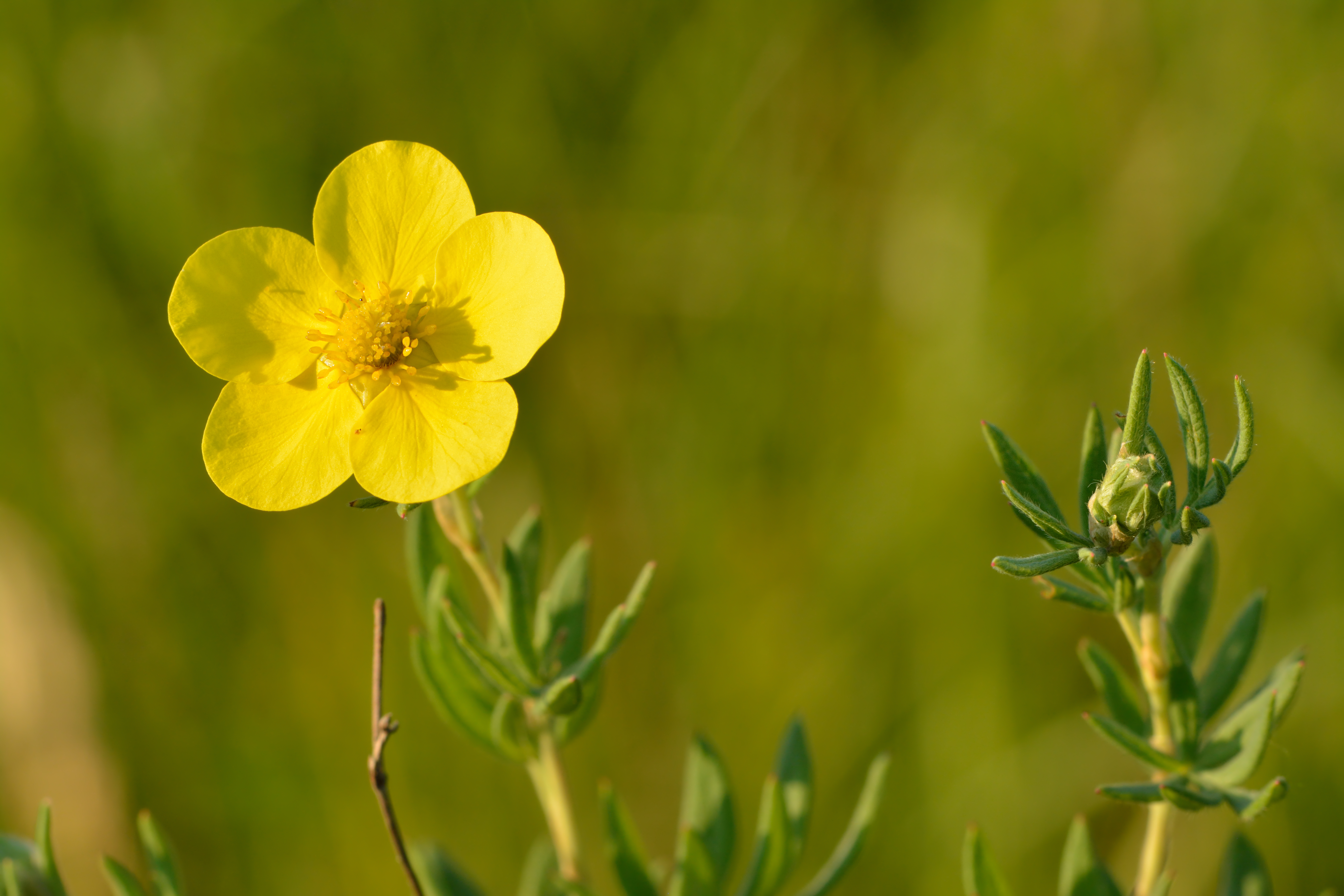
Dasiphora fruticosa subsp. fruticosa, Estonia

Dasiphora fruticosa is a species of hardy deciduous flowering shrub in the family Rosaceae, native to the cool temperate and subarctic regions of the northern hemisphere, often growing at high elevations in mountains. Dasiphora fruticosa is still widely referenced in the horticultural literature under its synonym Potentilla fruticosa. Common names include shrubby cinquefoil, golden hardhack, bush cinquefoil, shrubby five-finger, widdy, kuril tea and tundra rose.

== Description ==
It grows to 0.1–1 m (3.9–39.4 in) tall, rarely up to 1.5 m (4.9 ft). The habit is variably upright to sprawling or prostrate, but stems are often ascending especially those stems with many long branches. The bark of older stems is shreddy with long thin strips. The plants are densely leafy, the leaves divided into five or seven (occasionally three or nine) pinnate leaflets. The leaflets are linear-oblong, 3–20 mm (0.1–0.8 in) long, with entire margins and more or less acute ends. The foliage (both leaves and young stems) is pubescent, variably covered in fine silky, silvery hairs about 1 mm long. The flowers are produced terminally on the stems and are 2–3 cm (0.8–1.2 in) cm across, buttercup-shaped, with five petals and 15–25 stamens; the petals are pale to bright yellow (orange to reddish in some western Chinese populations). The fruit is a cluster of achenes covered with long hairs. The species is variably dioecious or bisexual; flowering is typically from early to late summer. It is normally found growing in moisture-retentive soils in swamps and rocky areas.

The plant is usually only eaten by wildlife when other food sources are scarce,.

== Taxonomy ==
Sources vary in the number of infraspecific taxa accepted. As of May 2022, the Germplasm Resources Information Network (GRIN) accepts two subspecies:

- Dasiphora fruticosa subsp. fruticosa. Described from Yorkshire, England and Öland, Sweden. Northern Europe (scattered, in Estonia, Great Britain, Ireland, Latvia, and Sweden) and northern and central Asia.
- Dasiphora fruticosa subsp. floribunda (Pursh) Kartesz (syns. Potentilla floribunda Pursh., Dasiphora floribunda (Pursh) Raf., Pentaphylloides floribunda (Pursh) A.Love)). Described from Canada, New York, and New Jersey, North America. Asia, southern Europe (Spain east to Bulgaria), and North America.

As of May 2022, Plants of the World Online does not recognize Dasiphora fruticosa subsp. floribunda, but does recognize a variety distinct from Dasiphora fruticosa var. fruticosa:

- Dasiphora fruticosa var. veitchii (E.H.Wilson) Nakai (syns Dasiphora veitchii (E.H.Wilson) Soják, Potentilla arbuscula var. veitchii (E.H.Wilson) Liou, Potentilla veitchii E.H.Wilson), native to China (Sichuan, Yunnan)

Numerous other varieties have been described from Asia, some of which have not yet been published under the genus Dasiphora, and others in that genus only as distinct species. These include Potentilla fruticosa var. albicans Rehd. & Wils., P. f. var. arbuscula (D.Don) Maxim. (syn. Dasiphora arbuscula (D.Don) Soják), P. f. var. dahurica (Nestl.) Ser. (syn. Dasiphora dahurica (Nestl.) Komarov), P. f. var. pumila J.D.Hooker, P. f. var. mandschurica (Maxim.) Wolf (syn. Dasiphora mandshurica (Maxim.) Juz.), and P. f. var. unifoliolata Ludlow (syn. Dasiphora unifoliolata (Ludlow) Soják). The varieties D. f. var. monticola Rydb. and D. f. var. tenuiloba Rydb. have been described from western North America, but are not widely accepted as distinct.

== Cultivation and decorative uses ==
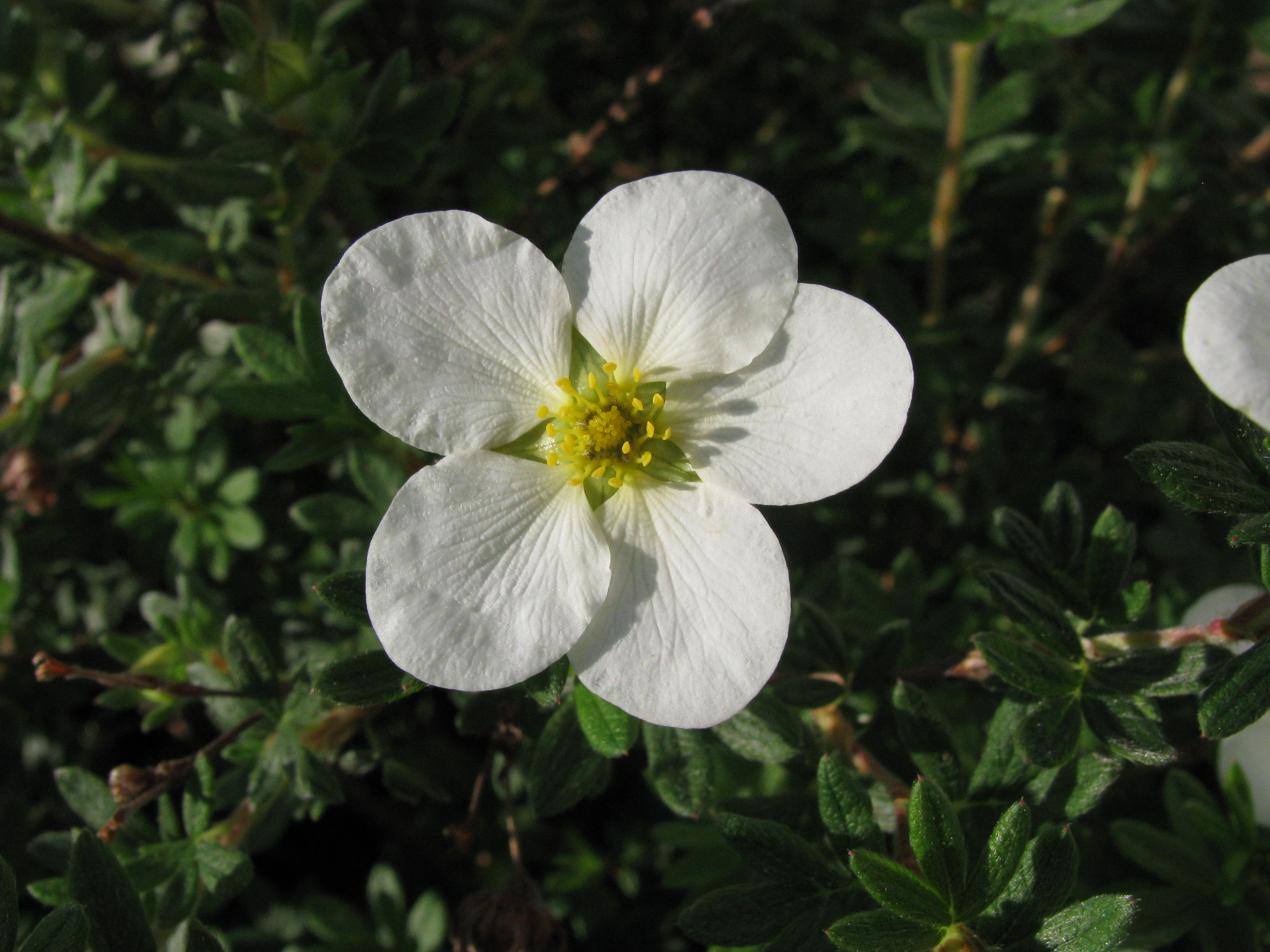
'Mckay's White' cultivar

Shrubby cinquefoil is a popular ornamental plant in temperate regions. Different cultivars are variable with flowers ranging from white to yellow, orange and pink, but they are all hardy plants that produce flowers for much of the summer. The flowers are always small, flat, and round, but there are many dozens on each bush. It is very often used by cities and businesses for landscaping because of its hardiness and low maintenance. It was introduced into cultivation in the 18th century, but many of the modern cultivars, particularly those with orange or red flowers, derive from collections by Reginald Farrer in western China in the early 20th century. The vast majority of sellers and gardeners still use the old name Potentilla fruticosa.

All the characteristics of small leaves, delicate flowers, and orange to brown flaky bark make the shrubby cinquefoil suitable for bonsai. It is very popular in Japan and is gaining popularity in Europe.

== Cultivars ==
Below is a recommended selection of over 130 cultivars which have been named. Those marked agm have gained the Royal Horticultural Society's Award of Garden Merit.

- 'Abbotswood' – large white flowers and bluish green foliage. agm
- 'Beanii' – green foliage and white flowers.
- 'Chelsea Star' – small yellow flowers. agm
- 'Coronation Triumph' – medium-bright yellow flowers, plants are drought- and cold-tolerant and heavy bloomers.
- 'Daydawn' – salmon-pink flowers.
- 'Day Dawn Viette' – peach-soft rose flowers highlighted with cream.
- 'Elizabeth' – yellow flowers to 3.5 cm diameter.
- 'Farreri' – leaves mostly with seven leaflets, flowers golden yellow.
- 'Farrer's White' – as 'Farreri', but with white flowers.

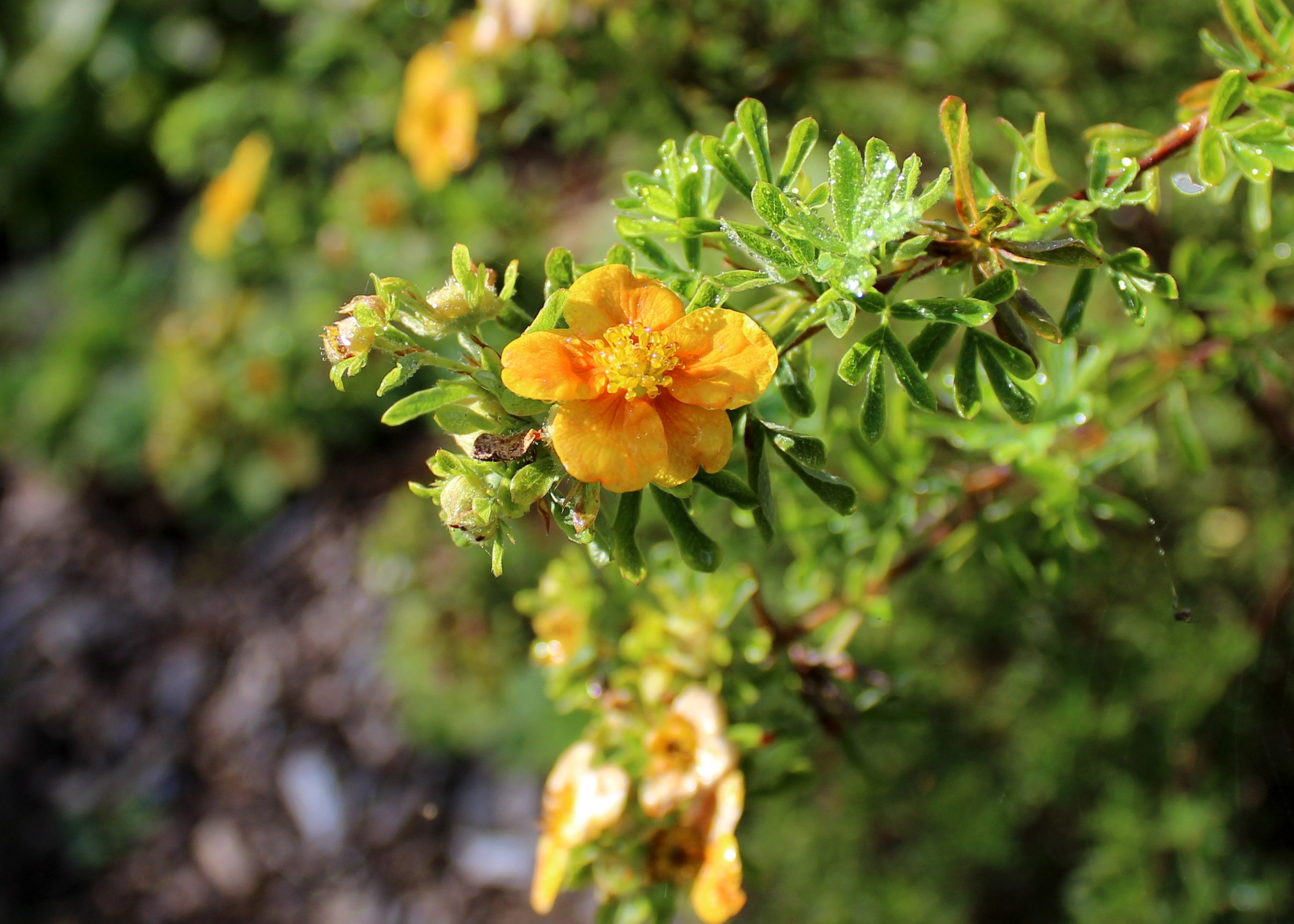
'Hopley's Orange'

- 'Goldfinger' – deep golden-yellow flowers on plants with dark green foliage, good plant form and heavy flowering.
- 'Groneland' – white flowers tinged yellow. agm
- 'Hopleys Orange' – orange flowers agm
- 'Jackman's Variety' – yellow flowers agm
- 'Katherine Dykes' – gracefully arching branches with lemon-yellow flowers, medium green foliage; needs regular trimming to keep from becoming leggy
- 'King Cup' – bright yellow flowers similar to kingcup agm
- 'Klondike' – large bright yellow flowers, 3.5–4 cm diameter
- 'Limelight' – pale yellow flowers with darker centres agm
- 'Marian Red Robin', 'Marrob' (PBR) – red flowers, yellow on reverse agm
- 'Maanelys' ('Moonlight') – leaves blue-green, flowers pale yellow
- 'Mckay's White' – creamy white flowers
- 'Medicine Wheel Mountain' – almost prostrate with bright yellow flowers agm
- 'Mount Everest' – flowers large, 3-3.5 cm, white
- 'Pink Beauty' – deep pink flowers agm
- 'Pink Queen' – pink flowers
- 'Primrose Beauty' – pale yellow flowers, silver tinted foliage; agm
- 'Pyrenaica' – prostrate, to 20 cm tall; leaves mostly with three leaflets; flowers golden yellow
- 'Red Ace' – bushy, upright shrub bearing profusions of single bright orange flowers from early summer to first frost
- 'Snowbird' – double flowers with 12–15 white petals. Blooms more than 'Abbotswood' and has dark green foliage
- 'Sommerflor' – golden yellow flowers agm
- 'Tangerine' – as 'Farreri', but with orange-red flowers
- 'Vilmoriniana' – vigorous, to 1.3 m tall; leaves grey-white hairy, flowers ivory white to pale yellow
- 'Walton Park' – flowers very large, 3.5–4 cm, golden yellow
- 'William Purdom' – leaves mostly with seven leaflets, flowers pale yellow
- 'Yellow Bird' – bright yellow semi-double flowers with 8–10 petals; medium green foliage and winter hardy agm
